= Parchment, Michigan =

- City
- City of Parchment
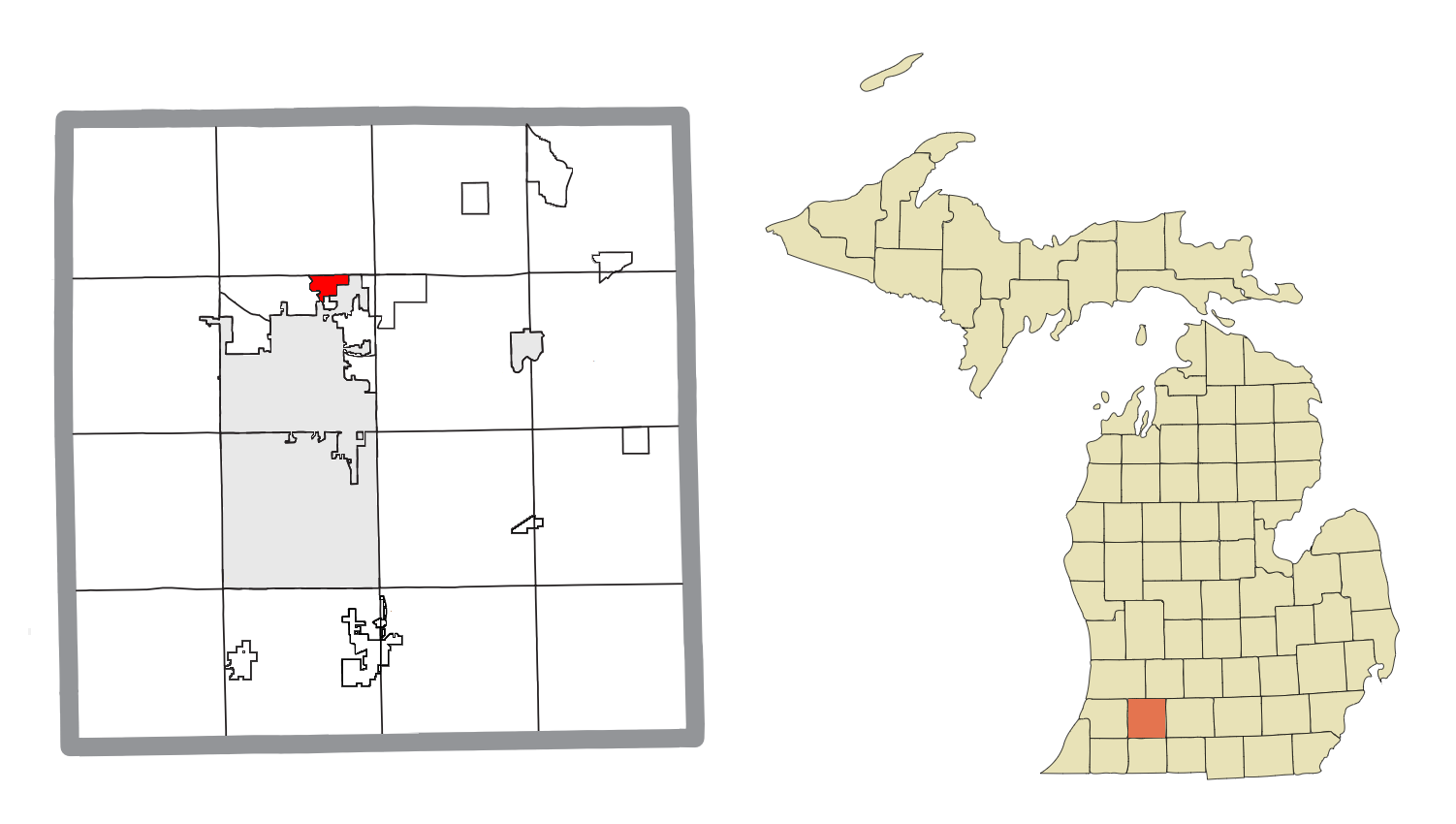
- Location within Kalamazoo County

- Location within the state of Michigan Location within the United States
- Coordinates: 42°19′32″N 85°34′04″W
- Country: United States
- State: Michigan
- County: Kalamazoo
- Settled: 1909
- Incorporated: 1939

Government
  - Type: City commission
  - Mayor: Robert Britigan III
  - Vice mayor: Tom Jordan
  - Manager: Nancy Stoddard

Area
  - Total: 0.94 sq mi (2.43 km^{2})
  - Land: 0.92 sq mi (2.38 km^{2})
  - Water: 0.019 sq mi (0.05 km^{2})
- Elevation: 774 ft (236 m)

Population (2020)
  - Total: 1,926
  - Density: 2,093.48/sq mi (808.30/km^{2})
- Time zone: UTC-5 (Eastern (EST))
  - Summer (DST): UTC-4 (EDT)
- ZIP code(s): 49004
- Area code: 269
- FIPS code: 26-62340
- GNIS feature ID: 0634353
- Website: Official website

Parchment is a city in Kalamazoo County in the U.S. state of Michigan. The 2020 census recorded a population of 1,926. The name is derived from the parchment company that used to manufacture paper on the East bank of the Kalamazoo River.

Parchment is located just northeast of the city of Kalamazoo, and it is mostly surrounded by Kalamazoo Township with Cooper Township to the north.

== History ==
The Kalamazoo Vegetable Parchment Company was founded in 1909. The founder, Jacob "Uncle Jake" Kindleberger, set up shop along the Kalamazoo River. The company then started selling pieces of land located around the mill to the mill workers. In 1932, Kindleberger donated 40 acres (160,000 m^{2}) of land located in the center of the city and across the street from the mill. The land was hilly and was determined to be unsuitable for industrial use. This land became Kindleberger Park. In 1939, Parchment became a city. Over the years, the KVP Company was bought by or merged with other companies, including Sutherland Paper Company, Brown Company, Gulf & Western, James River, Fort Howard, Georgia Pacific, and finally Crown-Vantage. In 2000 paper making in Parchment ended, and thereafter the city has struggled to sustain itself. Its population has debated what to do with the old paper mill property. As of 2011 the completed remediation includes the demolition of Mill #1 and the capping of the landfills. In 2018 a crisis followed discovery of municipal water contamination. As of 2026 eighteen buildings remain abandoned with plans to demolish two large above ground storage tanks.

=== Jacob Kindleberger ===
Jacob “Uncle Jake” Kindleberger was born in Alsace-Lorraine in 1875 and entered paper-mill work as a child. After becoming a successful parchment-paper salesman, he founded the Kalamazoo Vegetable Parchment Company along the Kalamazoo River in 1909. KVP grew into the economic engine of the settlement that became Parchment, but Kindleberger built more than a factory. He constructed a tightly integrated company town whose workers depended upon the mill for employment, housing, financing, public services, and community life.

KVP purchased and platted much of the surrounding farmland, rented more than fifty company houses, financed workers’ homes, and required company approval of houses built on employee lots. Municipal business was conducted from the KVP office, most village officials worked for the company, the school board was dominated by KVP employees, and the mill represented more than 90 percent of the community’s assessed property value. Kindleberger’s paternalism offered real security, including jobs for life and assistance for injured workers, but it also concentrated extraordinary power in one employer. The same institution could determine where a worker labored, where his family lived, how his home was built, who governed the town, and even the rhythms of recreation and religion. Parchment was presented as a family, but Kindleberger stood at its head as employer, landlord, planner, financier, civic patron, and moral authority.

=== 2018 Water Emergency ===
In July 2018, state testing detected high concentrations of per- and polyfluoroalkyl substances (PFAS) in Parchment's municipal drinking-water system. Results reported on July 26 from a sample collected on June 18 showed 1,587 parts per trillion (ppt) of total PFAS in treated water from the combined output of the city's three wells. The sample contained 670 ppt of PFOA and 740 ppt of PFOS, for a combined concentration of 1,410 ppt—more than twenty times the United States Environmental Protection Agency's then-current lifetime health advisory of 70 ppt for PFOA and PFOS, individually or combined. These concentrations were approximately 168 and 185 times, respectively, the federal maximum contaminant levels of 4 ppt subsequently established by the EPA in 2024.

On July 26, health officials issued a "Do Not Drink" advisory directing approximately 3,100 customers in Parchment and portions of Cooper Township not to use the water for drinking, cooking, preparing infant formula or food, or rinsing produce. Bottled-water distribution began the following morning.

Kalamazoo County declared a local state of emergency, and on July 29 Lieutenant Governor Brian Calley declared a state of emergency for the county. Parchment's distribution system was flushed and connected to the City of Kalamazoo water system. The drinking-water advisory was lifted on August 27 after testing showed that water quality had stabilized.

Parchment's municipal wells were taken out of service following the contamination, and the city has continued to receive drinking water through connections to Kalamazoo's municipal system.

=== PFAS/PFOS Contamination ===
PFAS-containing oil- and grease-repellent chemicals were historically used in papermaking operations in Parchment. A 1994 material safety data sheet obtained during the contamination investigation identified 3M's Scotchban FX-845, whose principal ingredient was described as a perfluoroalkyl polymer, as a product used in laminated paper manufactured at the Parchment mill. A patent assigned to James River Corporation also identifies Scotchban FX-845 as a 3M fluoroalkyl polymer containing between 35 and 40 percent fluorine by weight.

In 1993, James River Corporation and 3M introduced a single-ply automotive paint-masking paper manufactured at James River's Parchment Mill No. 2. The paper was treated with 3M's Scotchban FX-845 and FC-807, PFAS-based fluoroalkyl polymer that provided resistance to water-based and solvent-based automotive paints. James River reported that production increased from 60 tons in 1992 to 600 tons in 1993, with sales of between 1,000 and 1,500 tons projected for 1995.

The former Crown Vantage mill and unlined landfills had a different corporate history from the interconnected EPIC-Dixie plant. James River transferred the Parchment mill #2 to Crown Vantage in a 1995 corporate spin-off, and Crown Vantage remained the final company to manufacture paper at the original KVP mill. James River subsequently merged with Fort Howard Corporation in 1997 to form Fort James. Georgia-Pacific acquired Fort James in 2000, including the separate EPIC-Dixie plant in Parchment, which Georgia-Pacific closed in 2015.

The Crown Vantage mill closed in November 2000 during Crown Vantage's bankruptcy proceedings. Georgia-Pacific states that it never owned or operated the Crown Vantage mill or its associated landfills, but The EPIC-Dixie plant disposed of its waste in the nearby landfill until it was closed. Georgia-Pacific worked with the State of Michigan to close and cap the landfills in 2003. From 2009 through 2016, more than $2 million was spent demolishing approximately one-third of the former Crown Vantage mill property. In 2019, the city purchased 67.13 acres (27.17 ha) of the former mill site from River Reach Partners for one dollar, intending to pursue environmental cleanup and redevelopment.

In 2021, 3M and Georgia-Pacific agreed to contribute a combined $11.9 million to settle class-action claims brought on behalf of people who owned, rented, or lived in properties served by the Parchment water system when the contamination was discovered.

== Geography ==
According to the United States Census Bureau, the city has a total area of 0.93 sq mi (2.41 km^{2}), of which 0.92 sq mi (2.38 km^{2}) is land and 0.01 sq mi (0.03 km^{2}) is water.

== Demographics ==
Historical population
Census	Pop.	Note	%±
1940	934		—
1950	1,179		26.2%
1960	1,565		32.7%
1970	2,027		29.5%
1980	1,817		−10.4%
1990	1,958		7.8%
2000	1,936		−1.1%
2010	1,804		−6.8%
2020	1,926		6.8%
U.S. Decennial Census

=== 2020 census ===
As of the 2020 census, Parchment had a population of 1,926. The median age was 36.3 years. 23.7% of residents were under the age of 18 and 13.1% of residents were 65 years of age or older. For every 100 females there were 88.5 males, and for every 100 females age 18 and over there were 87.1 males age 18 and over.

100.0% of residents lived in urban areas, while 0.0% lived in rural areas.

There were 823 households in Parchment, of which 31.2% had children under the age of 18 living in them. Of all households, 36.7% were married-couple households, 19.4% were households with a male householder and no spouse or partner present, and 34.6% were households with a female householder and no spouse or partner present. About 30.5% of all households were made up of individuals and 9.3% had someone living alone who was 65 years of age or older.

There were 879 housing units, of which 6.4% were vacant. The homeowner vacancy rate was 1.5% and the rental vacancy rate was 7.0%.

Racial composition as of the 2020 census
Race	Number	Percent
White	1,423	73.9%
Black or African American	286	14.8%
American Indian and Alaska Native	14	0.7%
Asian	22	1.1%
Native Hawaiian and Other Pacific Islander	3	0.2%
Some other race	35	1.8%
Two or more races	143	7.4%
Hispanic or Latino (of any race)	61	3.2%

=== 2010 census ===
As of the census of 2010, there were 1,804 people, 786 households, and 484 families residing in the city. The population density was 1,960.9/sq mi (757.1/km^{2}). There were 881 housing units at an average density of 957.6 per square mile (369.7/km^{2}). The racial makeup of the city was 84.6% White, 8.5% African American, 0.2% Native American, 1.3% Asian, 1.3% from other races, and 4.0% from two or more races. Hispanic or Latino of any race were 3.4% of the population.

There were 786 households, of which 31.0% had children under the age of 18 living with them, 40.2% were married couples living together, 16.9% had a female householder with no husband present, 4.5% had a male householder with no wife present, and 38.4% were non-families. 32.4% of all households were made up of individuals, and 9.1% had someone living alone who was 65 years of age or older. The average household size was 2.30 and the average family size was 2.89.

The median age in the city was 38.5 years. 24.2% of residents were under the age of 18; 8.8% were between the ages of 18 and 24; 26.3% were from 25 to 44; 28.9% were from 45 to 64; and 12% were 65 years of age or older. The gender makeup of the city was 46.2% male and 53.8% female.

=== 2000 census ===
As of the census of 2000, there were 1,936 people, 822 households, and 531 families residing in the city. The population density was 2,263.6 inhabitants per square mile (874.0/km^{2}). There were 873 housing units at an average density of 1,020.7 per square mile (394.1/km^{2}). The racial makeup of the city was 92.67% White, 4.18% African American, 0.01% Sicilian, 0.31% Native American, 0.67% Asian, 0.36% from other races, and 1.81% from two or more races. Hispanic or Latino of any race were 0.93% of the population.

There were 822 households, out of which 34.1% had children under the age of 18 living with them, 45.4% were married couples living together, 16.1% had a female householder with no husband present, and 35.3% were non-families. 31.4% of all households were made up of individuals, and 9.9% had someone living alone who was 65 years of age or older. The average household size was 2.34 and the average family size was 2.94.

In the city, the population was spread out, with 27.2% under the age of 18, 8.0% from 18 to 24, 29.6% from 25 to 44, 22.2% from 45 to 64, and 13.0% who were 65 years of age or older. The median age was 37 years. For every 100 females, there were 81.3 males. For every 100 females age 18 and over, there were 80.9 males.

The median income for a household in the city was $40,074, and the median income for a family was $46,957. Males had a median income of $36,415 versus $25,484 for females. The per capita income for the city was $18,911. About 2.5% of families and 4.4% of the population were below the poverty line, including 2.4% of those under age 18 and 2.8% of those age 65 or over.

== Schools ==
The city of Parchment has three elementary schools, one middle school, one high school, and Parchment Innovation Center, an alternative public school. Parchment High School was built in 1959 to accommodate the city's growing population. Prior to 1959, Parchment students went through 8th grade and then went to Kalamazoo Central High School. In the mid 1950s Kalamazoo Public Schools was considering annexing Parchment into their district. Laurence Tisch, who read water meters for the city started a petition with his wife Jean Tisch to build a new High School. The community was successful in purchasing property and the school was built. The first class graduated in 1961.
