= Greater Galesburg, Michigan =

- Unincorporated community & former census-designated place (CDP)
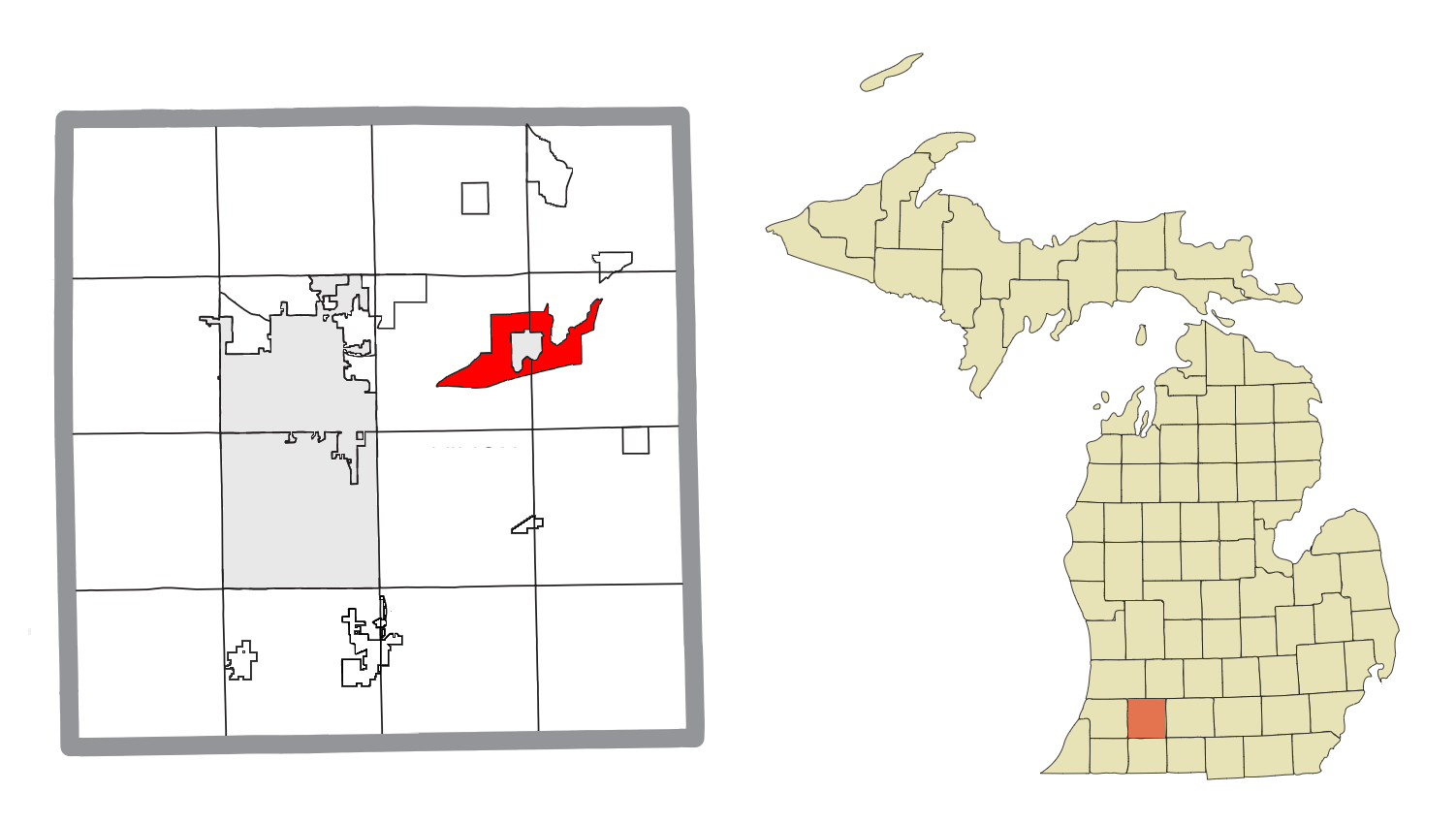
- Former location within Kalamazoo County

- Location within the state of Michigan Location within the United States
- Coordinates: 42°17′5″N 85°25′46″W
- Country: United States
- State: Michigan
- County: Kalamazoo
- Townships: Charleston and Comstock

Area
  - Total: 7.6 sq mi (19.8 km^{2})
  - Land: 6.6 sq mi (17.2 km^{2})
  - Water: 1.0 sq mi (2.6 km^{2})

Population (2000)
  - Total: 1,631
  - Density: 245/sq mi (94.7/km^{2})
- Time zone: UTC-5 (Eastern (EST))
  - Summer (DST): UTC-4 (EDT)
- FIPS code: 26-34670
- GNIS feature ID: 2393026

Greater Galesburg was a census-designated place (CDP) in Kalamazoo County in the U.S. state of Michigan, surrounding the city of Galesburg. As a CDP, it was used for statistical purposes and does not have any legal status as a municipality. The population was 1,631 at the 2000 census. The CDP was deleted and not reported in the 2010 census.

The CDP area included land in Comstock Charter Township on the west and Charleston Township on the east. The area was closely identified with the city of Galesburg, but was outside of the city's municipal boundaries.

== Geography ==
According to the United States Census Bureau, the CDP had a total area of 7.7 square miles (20 km^{2}), of which, 6.7 square miles (17 km^{2}) of it was land and 1.0 square mile (2.6 km^{2}) of it (13.07%) was water.

== Demographics ==
As of the census of 2000, there were 1,631 people, 633 households, and 450 families residing in the CDP. The population density was 245.2 inhabitants per square mile (94.7/km^{2}). There were 658 housing units at an average density of 98.9 per square mile (38.2/km^{2}). The racial makeup of the CDP was 96.38% White, 0.86% Black or African American, 0.06% Native American, 0.37% Asian, 0.43% from other races, and 1.90% from two or more races. Hispanic or Latino of any race were 1.04% of the population.

There were 633 households, out of which 34.0% had children under the age of 18 living with them, 59.6% were married couples living together, 9.0% had a female householder with no husband present, and 28.8% were non-families. 22.4% of all households were made up of individuals, and 8.7% had someone living alone who was 65 years of age or older. The average household size was 2.56 and the average family size was 3.02.

In the CDP, the population was spread out, with 27.0% under the age of 18, 5.5% from 18 to 24, 33.5% from 25 to 44, 21.9% from 45 to 64, and 12.0% who were 65 years of age or older. The median age was 36 years. For every 100 females, there were 91.2 males. For every 100 females age 18 and over, there were 90.6 males.

The median income for a household in the CDP was $47,125, and the median income for a family was $55,172. Males had a median income of $35,417 versus $30,179 for females. The per capita income for the CDP was $19,368. About 7.4% of families and 9.6% of the population were below the poverty line, including 12.4% of those under age 18 and 3.2% of those age 65 or over.
