= Comstock Northwest, Michigan =

- Census-designated place (CDP) & unincorporated community
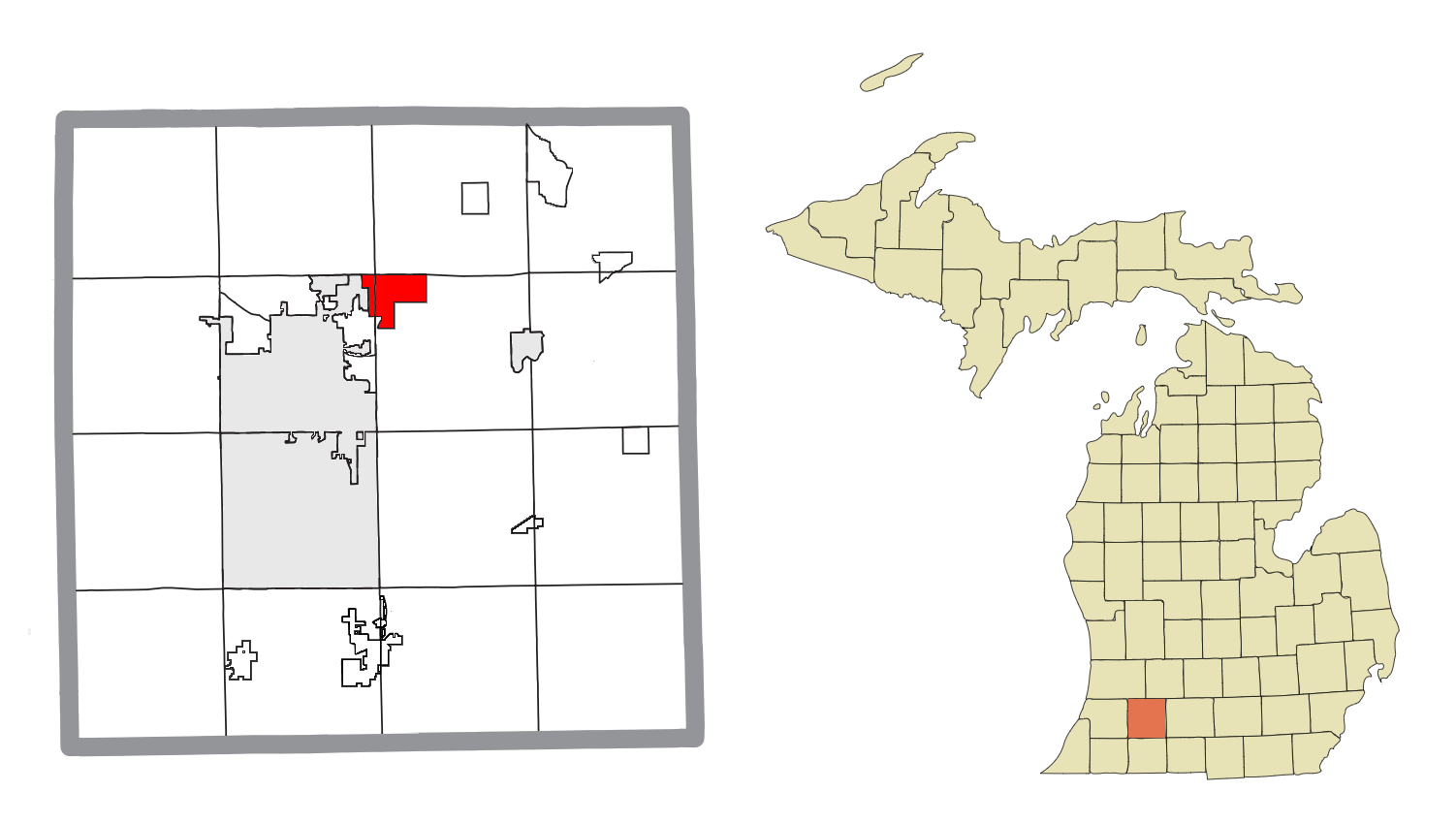
- Location within Kalamazoo County

- Location within the state of Michigan Location within the United States
- Coordinates: 42°19′23″N 85°31′19″W
- Country: United States
- State: Michigan
- County: Kalamazoo
- Townships: Comstock, Kalamazoo

Area
  - Total: 3.25 sq mi (8.41 km^{2})
  - Land: 3.23 sq mi (8.37 km^{2})
  - Water: 0.015 sq mi (0.04 km^{2})
- Elevation: 870 ft (270 m)

Population (2020)
  - Total: 5,562
  - Density: 1,721.4/sq mi (664.64/km^{2})
- Time zone: UTC-5 (Eastern (EST))
  - Summer (DST): UTC-4 (EDT)
- FIPS code: 26-17690
- GNIS feature ID: 2393384

Comstock Northwest is a census-designated place (CDP) in Kalamazoo County in the U.S. state of Michigan. As of the 2020 census, Comstock Northwest had a population of 5,562.

== Geography ==
The CDP is in the northwest portion of Comstock Charter Township, just northeast of Kalamazoo. It also includes a small sliver of land in northeast Kalamazoo Charter Township between the city of Kalamazoo and Comstock Charter Township. The CDP is bordered to the west by Kalamazoo and to the southwest by unincorporated Eastwood.

M-343 is the main highway through the community. It leads southwest 4 miles (6 km) to the center of Kalamazoo and northeast 5 miles (8 km) to Richland.

According to the United States Census Bureau, the Comstock Northwest CDP has a total area of 3.2 square miles (8.2 km^{2}), of which 0.02 square miles (0.04 km^{2}), or 0.54%, are water.

== Demographics ==
Historical population
Census	Pop.	Note	%±
2020	5,562		—
U.S. Decennial Census

=== 2020 census ===
As of the 2020 census, Comstock Northwest had a population of 5,562. The median age was 38.1 years. 17.9% of residents were under the age of 18 and 16.8% of residents were 65 years of age or older. For every 100 females there were 93.1 males, and for every 100 females age 18 and over there were 93.2 males age 18 and over.

100.0% of residents lived in urban areas, while 0.0% lived in rural areas.

There were 2,669 households in Comstock Northwest, of which 19.4% had children under the age of 18 living in them. Of all households, 35.2% were married-couple households, 23.6% were households with a male householder and no spouse or partner present, and 32.1% were households with a female householder and no spouse or partner present. About 41.7% of all households were made up of individuals and 12.4% had someone living alone who was 65 years of age or older.

There were 2,856 housing units, of which 6.5% were vacant. The homeowner vacancy rate was 0.2% and the rental vacancy rate was 9.1%.

Racial composition as of the 2020 census
Race	Number	Percent
White	4,107	73.8%
Black or African American	669	12.0%
American Indian and Alaska Native	29	0.5%
Asian	212	3.8%
Native Hawaiian and Other Pacific Islander	2	0.0%
Some other race	93	1.7%
Two or more races	450	8.1%
Hispanic or Latino (of any race)	275	4.9%

=== 2000 census ===
As of the census of 2000, there were 4,472 people, 1,965 households, and 1,208 families residing in the CDP. The population density was 1,404.3 inhabitants per square mile (542.2/km^{2}). There were 2,079 housing units at an average density of 652.9 per square mile (252.1/km^{2}). The racial makeup of the CDP was 87.81% White, 7.51% African American, 0.27% Native American, 1.65% Asian, 0.96% from other races, and 1.79% from two or more races. Hispanic or Latino of any race were 2.10% of the population.

There were 1,965 households, out of which 28.7% had children under the age of 18 living with them, 47.3% were married couples living together, 10.4% had a female householder with no husband present, and 38.5% were non-families. 32.4% of all households were made up of individuals, and 8.9% had someone living alone who was 65 years of age or older. The average household size was 2.27 and the average family size was 2.88.

In the CDP, the population was spread out, with 23.9% under the age of 18, 10.1% from 18 to 24, 30.4% from 25 to 44, 20.8% from 45 to 64, and 14.7% who were 65 years of age or older. The median age was 35 years. For every 100 females, there were 95.5 males. For every 100 females age 18 and over, there were 91.1 males.

The median income for a household in the CDP was $43,590, and the median income for a family was $56,115. Males had a median income of $41,698 versus $31,713 for females. The per capita income for the CDP was $23,961. About 5.3% of families and 6.1% of the population were below the poverty line, including 9.0% of those under age 18 and 3.4% of those age 65 or over.
