= Kalamazoo Township, Michigan =

- Charter township
- Charter Township of Kalamazoo
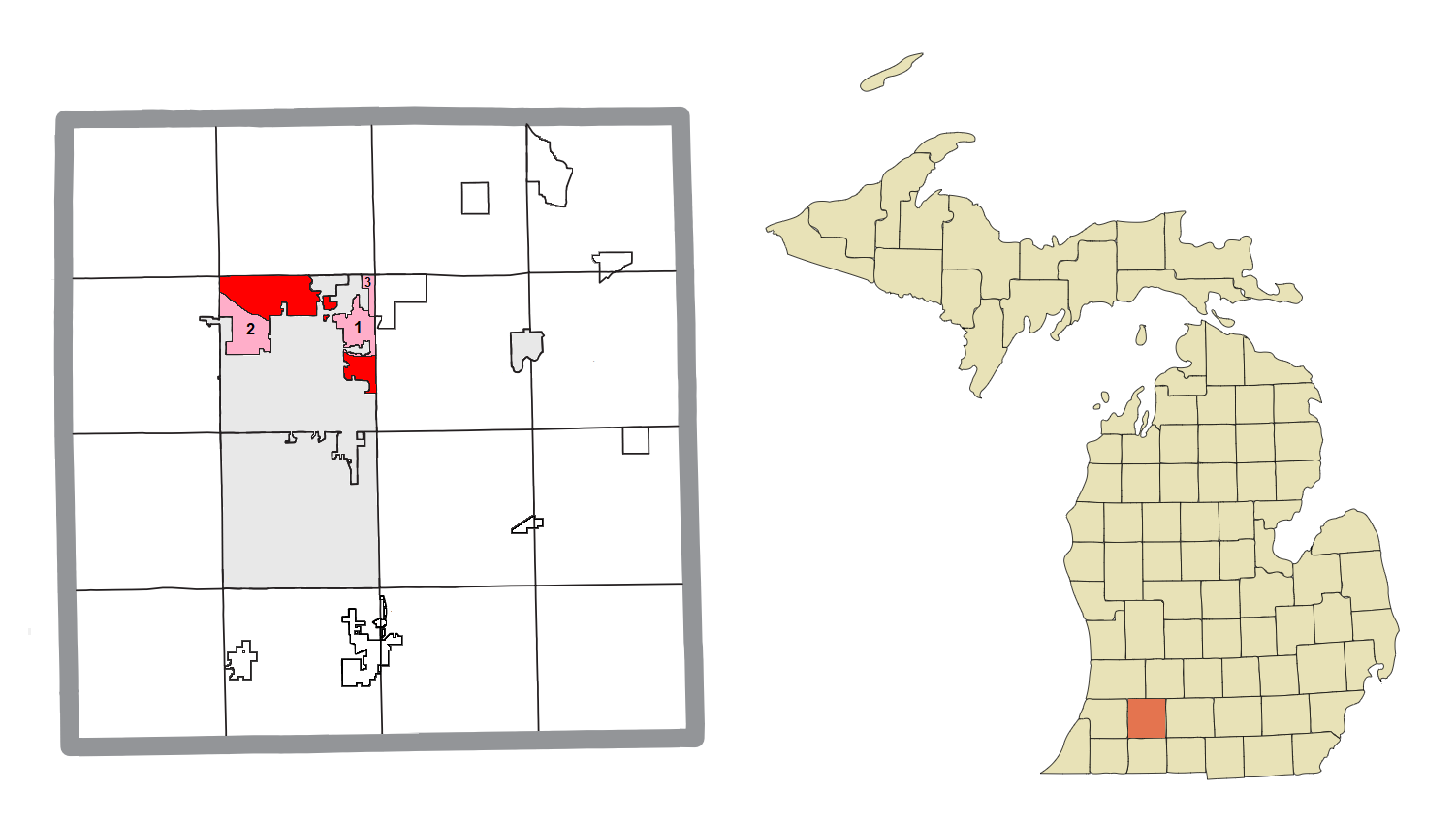
- Location within Kalamazoo County and the administered CDPs of Eastwood (1), Westwood (2), and portion of Comstock Northwest (3)

- Location within the state of Michigan Location within the United States
- Coordinates: 42°18′40″N 85°35′17″W
- Country: United States
- State: Michigan
- County: Kalamazoo
- Organized: July 30, 1830

Area
  - Total: 11.79 sq mi (30.54 km^{2})
  - Land: 11.68 sq mi (30.25 km^{2})
  - Water: 0.11 sq mi (0.29 km^{2})
- Elevation: 771 ft (235 m)

Population (2020)
  - Total: 22,777
  - Density: 1,950/sq mi (753.0/km^{2})
- Time zone: UTC-5 (Eastern (EST))
  - Summer (DST): UTC-4 (EDT)
- Area code: 269
- FIPS code: 26-42180
- GNIS feature ID: 1626548
- Website: www.ktwp.org

Kalamazoo Charter Township is a charter township of Kalamazoo County in the U.S. state of Michigan. The population was 22,777 at the 2020 census.

The cities of Kalamazoo and Parchment are adjacent to the township and have annexed much land that was formerly within the township, such that the township now consists of two non-contiguous sections of land and one small section that is connected by a narrow point across Riverview Drive. Three census-designated places (CDPs) are within the township: Eastwood, Westwood, and part of Comstock Northwest. These are defined for statistical purposes and do not have any legal status as municipalities. However, both have an identity as communities, although the areas defined by the CDPs may not precisely correspond to local use of the terms. The CDPs can include nearby areas that locals might not consider as part of the community with the same name.

Kalamazoo Township was initially organized under the name of "Arcadia Township" by an act of the Territorial Legislature on July 30, 1830. A separate act on the same day organized the government of Kalamazoo County. Initially Arcadia Township consisted of all eight of the northern tier of townships in Kalamazoo County. In June 1832, Richland Township was set off, consisting of Richland, Ross, Charleston, and Comstock townships. On March 2, 1836, Arcadia Township was renamed as Kalamazoo Township, the same day that the village of Bronson was renamed as Kalamazoo. On March 11, 1837, Cooper Township was set off, consisting of Cooper and Alamo townships. On March 22, 1839, Oshtemo Township was set off from Kalamazoo.

== Geography ==
According to the United States Census Bureau, the township has a total area of 11.8 square miles (30.5 km^{2}), of which 11.7 square miles (30.3 km^{2}) are land and 0.1 square miles (0.3 km^{2}), or 0.95%, are water.

== Government ==
The government of the township provides a number of services to its residents including its police department, fire stations, building and inspection services, and a planning and zoning board. The township allows residents to attend public meetings as well as bimonthly board meetings to voice concerns.

== Demographics ==
As of the census of 2000, there were 21,675 people, 9,349 households, and 5,338 families residing in the township. The population density was 1,856.4 inhabitants per square mile (716.8/km^{2}). There were 9,856 housing units at an average density of 844.1 per square mile (325.9/km^{2}). The racial makeup of the township was 82.46% White, 12.31% African American, 0.30% Native American, 1.17% Asian, 0.02% Pacific Islander, 1.61% from other races, and 2.13% from two or more races. Hispanic or Latino of any race were 3.07% of the population.

There were 9,349 households, out of which 25.9% had children under the age of 18 living with them, 42.4% were married couples living together, 10.9% had a female householder with no husband present, and 42.9% were non-families. 30.8% of all households were made up of individuals, and 10.9% had someone living alone who was 65 years of age or older. The average household size was 2.30 and the average family size was 2.89.

In the township the population was spread out, with 22.4% under the age of 18, 14.0% from 18 to 24, 29.8% from 25 to 44, 18.9% from 45 to 64, and 14.9% who were 65 years of age or older. The median age was 33 years. For every 100 females, there were 90.1 males. For every 100 females age 18 and over, there were 85.9 males.

The median income for a household in the township was $37,463, and the median income for a family was $46,161. Males had a median income of $35,993 versus $28,064 for females. The per capita income for the township was $19,844. About 6.0% of families and 11.0% of the population were below the poverty line, including 11.3% of those under age 18 and 2.7% of those age 65 or over.
