= Kalamazoo Public Schools =

School district in Michigan

Address
- 1220 Howard Street Kalamazoo, Michigan, 49008; United States
- Coordinates: 42°16′28″N 85°36′04″W

District information
- Superintendent: Dr. Darrin Slade
- Schools: 31
- Budget: $232,529,000 2022-2023 expenditures

Students and staff
- Enrollment: 12,273 (2024-25)
- Teachers: 693.4 (on an FTE basis) (2024-2025)
- Staff: 1,727.92 FTE (2024-2025)
- Student–teacher ratio: 17.7 (2024-2025)

Other information
- Website: www.kalamazoopublicschools.com

Kalamazoo Public Schools is a school district headquartered in Kalamazoo, Michigan. Graduates of the district are eligible to receive scholarships through the Kalamazoo Promise, a program launched in 2005 and funded by anonymous donors. The district operates 31 schools.

The district includes the majority of Kalamazoo, all of Westwood, and most of Eastwood. It also includes sections of the following townships: Kalamazoo, Oshtemo, and Texas.

== Scholarship program ==
Every resident graduate of the Kalamazoo Public Schools is provided with a scholarship for up to 100% of tuition and mandatory fee costs for four years at any public university or community college in Michigan, starting with the class of 2006. This program is known as the Kalamazoo Promise. Books and room and board are not included. In 2014, it was announced that 15 private colleges would also be included as Promise-eligible schools. In 2015, Communities in Schools of Kalamazoo received Communities in Schools' national Unsung Heroes award in recognition of elementary school programs aimed at overcoming cultural and language barriers faced by students.

== History ==
The first legal public high-school in Kalamazoo and in the state of Michigan began operating in 1858. The first class, consisting of five men and three women graduated in 1859. Former United States Senator Charles E. Stuart sued the Kalamazoo School Board in 1874 alleging that the school-board's use of taxpayer money to fund secondary education was unconstitutional (up until that point taxpayers money was only for elementary schools). The School Board prevailed, setting a precedent allowing publicly funded secondary education throughout the country.

In 1925 the school moved to the building currently known as Old Central High School at 714 South Westnedge. Old Central High School currently houses the Kalamazoo Area Mathematics and Science Center, or KAMSC. Following the largest graduating class of 799 students in 1960, some Central High School students transferred to the newly opened Loy Norrix High School in 1961. Central High School moved to its current location in 1972.

== Schools ==
Schools in Kalamazoo Public Schools district
School	Address	Notes
Elementary Schools (Grades PreK-5)
Arcadia Elementary	932 Boswell Lane, Kalamazoo	
Edison Academy	831 Lake Street, Kalamazoo	
El Sol Elementary	604 W. Vine Street, Kalamazoo	Spanish/English language immersion program.
Greenwood Elementary	3501 Moreland Street, Kalamazoo	
Indian Prairie Elementary	3546 Grand Prairie Road, Kalamazoo	
King-Westwood Elementary	1100 Nichols Road, Kalamazoo	
Lincoln International Studies School	912 N. Burdick Street, Kalamazoo	
Milwood Elementary	3400 Lovers Lane, Kalamazoo	
Northeastern Elementary	2433 Gertrude Street, Kalamazoo	
Northglade Montessori Magnet School	1914 Cobb Street, Kalamazoo	
Prairie Ridge Elementary	2294 S. 9th Street, Kalamazoo	
Parkwood-Upjohn Elementary	2321 S. Park Street, Kalamazoo	
Spring Valley Center for Exploration	3530 Mt. Olivet Road, Kalamazoo	
Washington Writers' Academy	1919 Portage Road, Kalamazoo	
Winchell Elementary	2316 Winchell Avenue, Kalamazoo	
Woods Lake Elementary	3215 Oakland Drive, Kalamazoo	
Woodward School	606 Stuart Avenue, Kalamazoo	
Middle Schools (Grades 6-8)
Alternative Learning Program (ALP)		
Hillside Middle School	1941 Alamo Avenue, Kalamazoo	
Maple Street Magnet School for the Arts	922 W. Maple Street, Kalamazoo	
Milwood Magnet School	2916 Konkle Street, Kalamazoo	
Linden Grove Middle School	4241 Arboretum Pkwy, Kalamazoo	
High Schools (Grades 9-12)
Loy Norrix High School	606 E. Kilgore Road, Kalamazoo	
Kalamazoo Innovative Learning Program	600 W. Vine Street, Kalamazoo	A virutal/in-person hybrid credit recovery high school. Housed at former Kalamazoo Central High School.
Kalamazoo Central High School	2432 N. Drake Road, Kalamazoo	
Phoenix High School	1411 Oakland Drive, Kalamazoo	Alternative high school.

== See also ==
- List of school districts in Michigan
- The Kalamazoo School Case at Kalamazoo Public Library
