= Kalamazoo Public Library =

Coordinates: 42°17′22.3″N 85°35′4.5″W

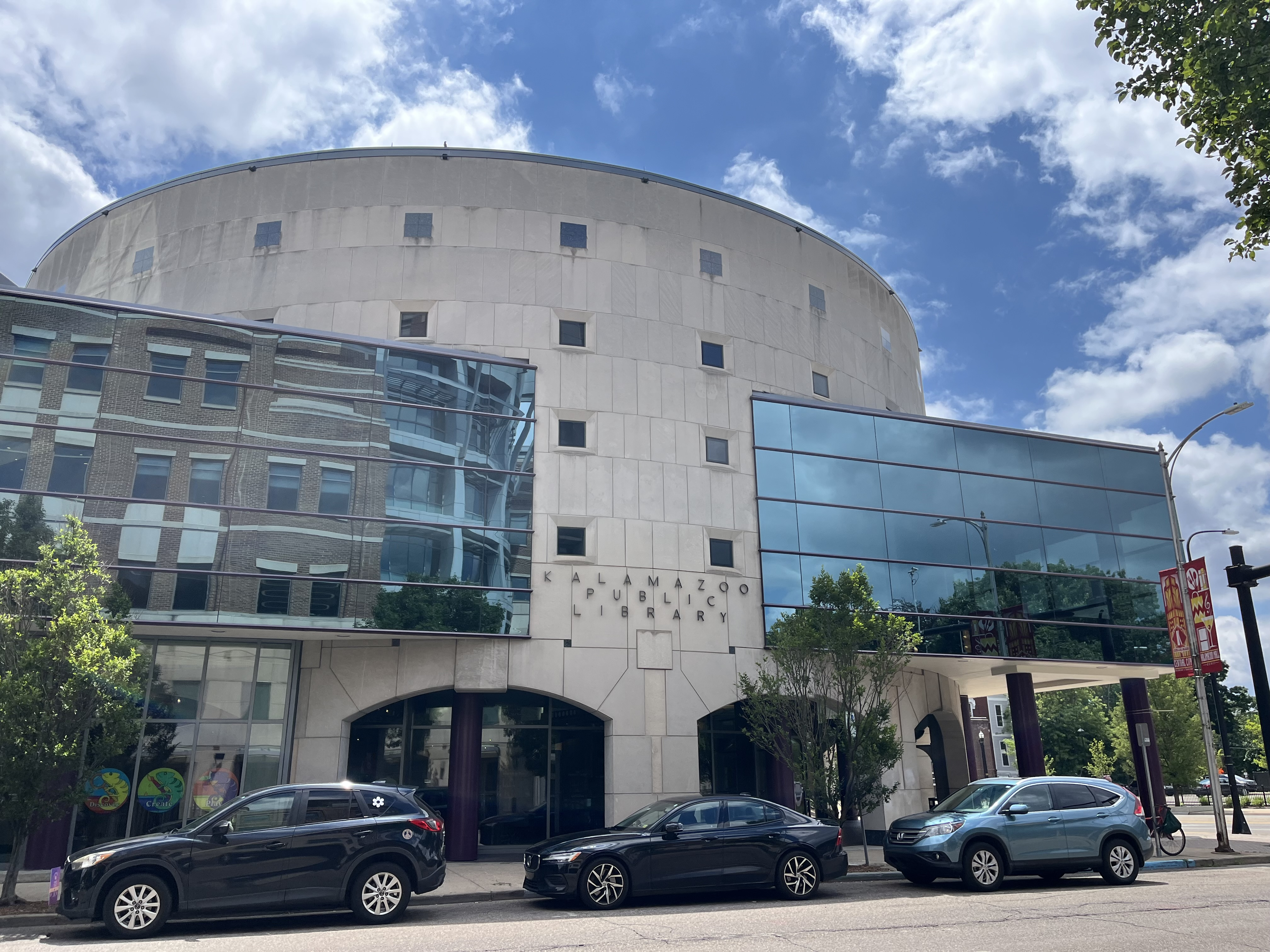
Kalamazoo Public Library

The Kalamazoo Public Library is an independent district library in Kalamazoo, Michigan, that serves about 120,000 people, has a salaried staff of 90, and spends about $10 million annually. The library consists of the central branch downtown, and four branch libraries.

== History ==
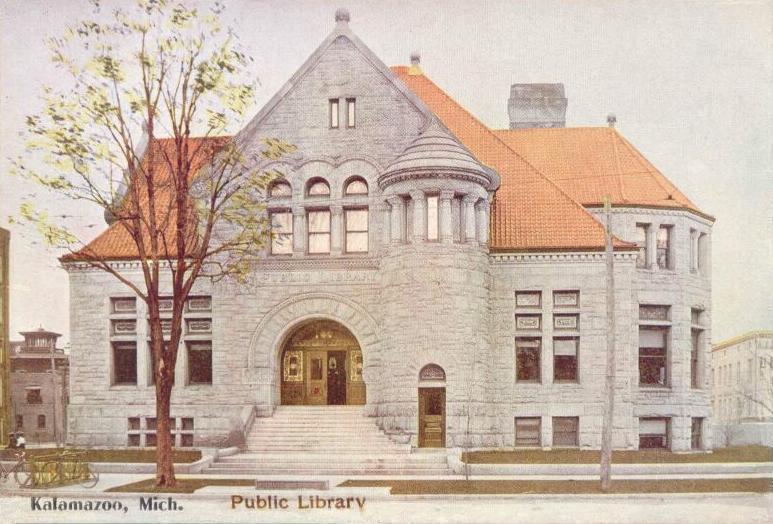
First library building in 1908

Kalamazoo Public Library was founded in 1893. The building was designed in the Romanesque Revival style, with several wings and towers filled with windows to capture natural light. Ulysses Wheaton built the structure, which stood for 65 years.

In 1958, construction began on a new building inspired by Le Corbusier’s Villa Savoye, a two-story, 1930s-era building near Paris, whose second level seems to float on columns surrounding a recessed ground floor. Designed by Louis C. Kingscott, Inc., and built by the Miller-Davis Company, the building opened in 1959, and combined the library and a museum.

In 1998, a new 4-story library building opened, which stands today at 315 South Rose Street in downtown Kalamazoo.

== Branches ==
- Oshtemo - located on the west side of Kalamazoo, in Oshtemo Township. The building is the second largest branch, and features most of the features available at the Central branch. The building's architecture is designed in such a way to allude to a castle. "The whimsical new building arose like a medieval village around a castle. Designed to appeal to children and the young at heart, it features colorful, basic geometric forms." Prior to discontinuation in 2010, the Oshtemo branch also housed the bookmobile.
- Eastwood - located on the east side of Kalamazoo, in Kalamazoo Township. The original east side library was opened in 1912. In 1996, the Eastwood branch took its current form when a new building was constructed.
- Alma-Powell - located on the north side of Kalamazoo. In May 1968 an anonymous gift of $10,000 was received by the Kalamazoo Board of Education for the purpose of establishing a library in the poorest section of town. The library has been in many locations since, but currently is located within the Douglass Community Centre.
- Washington Square - for more than 75 years, the branch has been a welcomed and welcoming fixture of the Edison Neighborhood.

== Services and technology ==
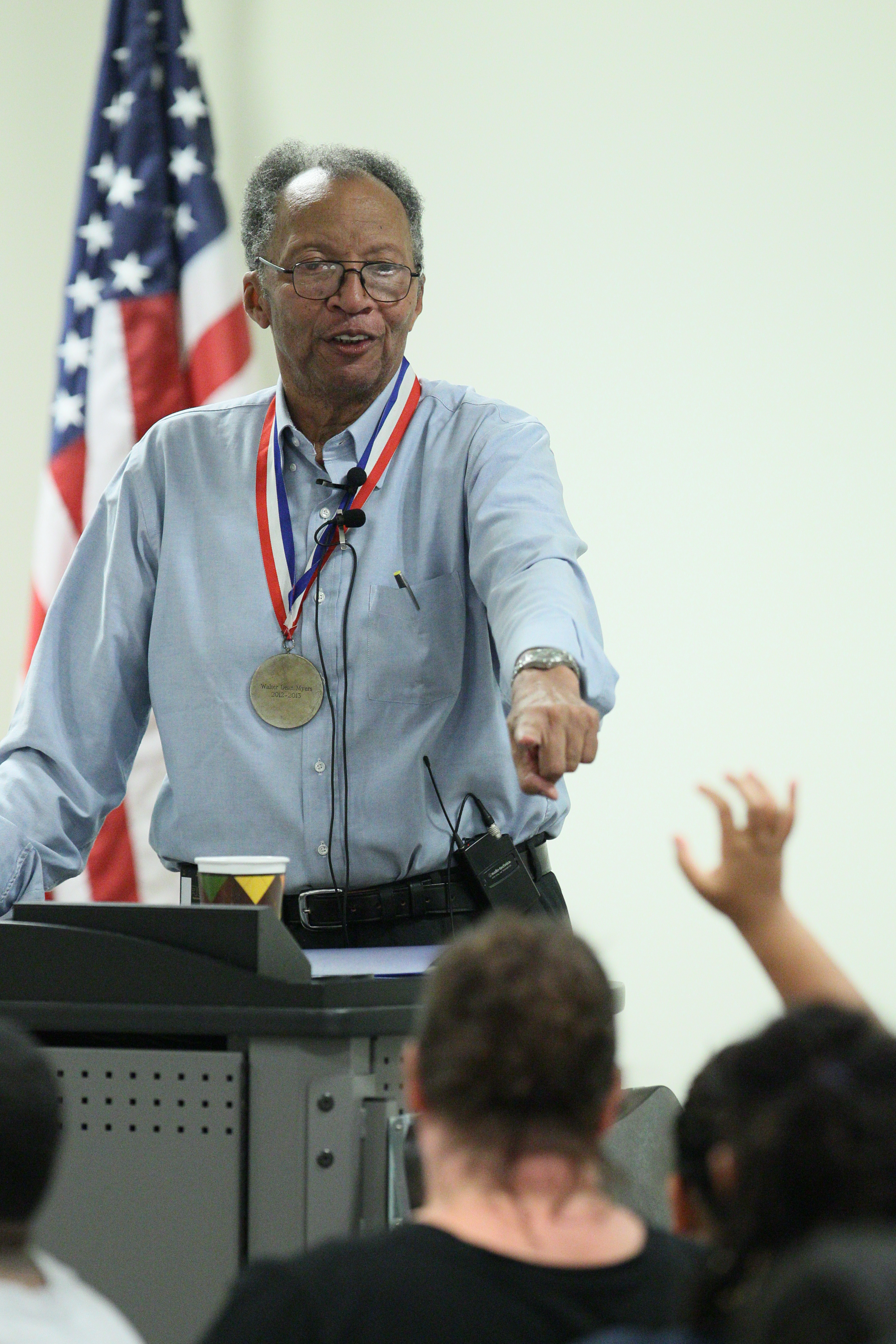
Walter Dean Myers speaks at KPL Central Library, August 6, 2013

In addition to traditional book lending and reference books, patrons of the library enjoy access to

- Access to language learning programs
- Booktoberfest.
- County Law Library
- Digital media lending (e-books, audiobooks)
- Local History Room
- Magazines and newspapers
- Movie lending
- Music lending
- ONEplace - a management support center for nonprofit organizations
- Programming
  - Adult programming
  - Children's programming (baby through teen)
- "Reading Together" - annual community reading event
- Idea Lab - a digital media lab
- Bookmobile service, which began in 1956, was discontinued March 31, 2010.

The Kalamazoo Public Library is technology friendly. All of the catalog data are computer based. The library also offers computers for use by patrons for finding books, accessing the internet, playing games, and word processing. The library also offers computer training classes for those who are not familiar with the internet, computer, software, or digital media use.

The library provides a free WiFi network for patrons. Digital titles (including e-books and audiobooks) are available for check-out through the library website (at the library or remotely).

In 2014, the library opened the 'Idea Lab', formerly known as 'The Hub', which is a digital media lab open to the public for digitizing photos and video, producing podcasts, preserving old vinyl records, cassettes and VHS tapes, and other services.

== Awards ==
- Named "Library of the Year" in 2002 by Thompson-Gale / Library Journal. "The Library of the Year Award honors the library that most profoundly demonstrates outstanding community service."
- State Librarian's "Citation of Excellence Award", 2012, for superior customer service, including an initiative to provide 1000 library cards to Kalamazoo Promise area eligible first grade students.
