= University Arena (Western Michigan University) =

Sports arena in Kalamazoo, Michigan, US

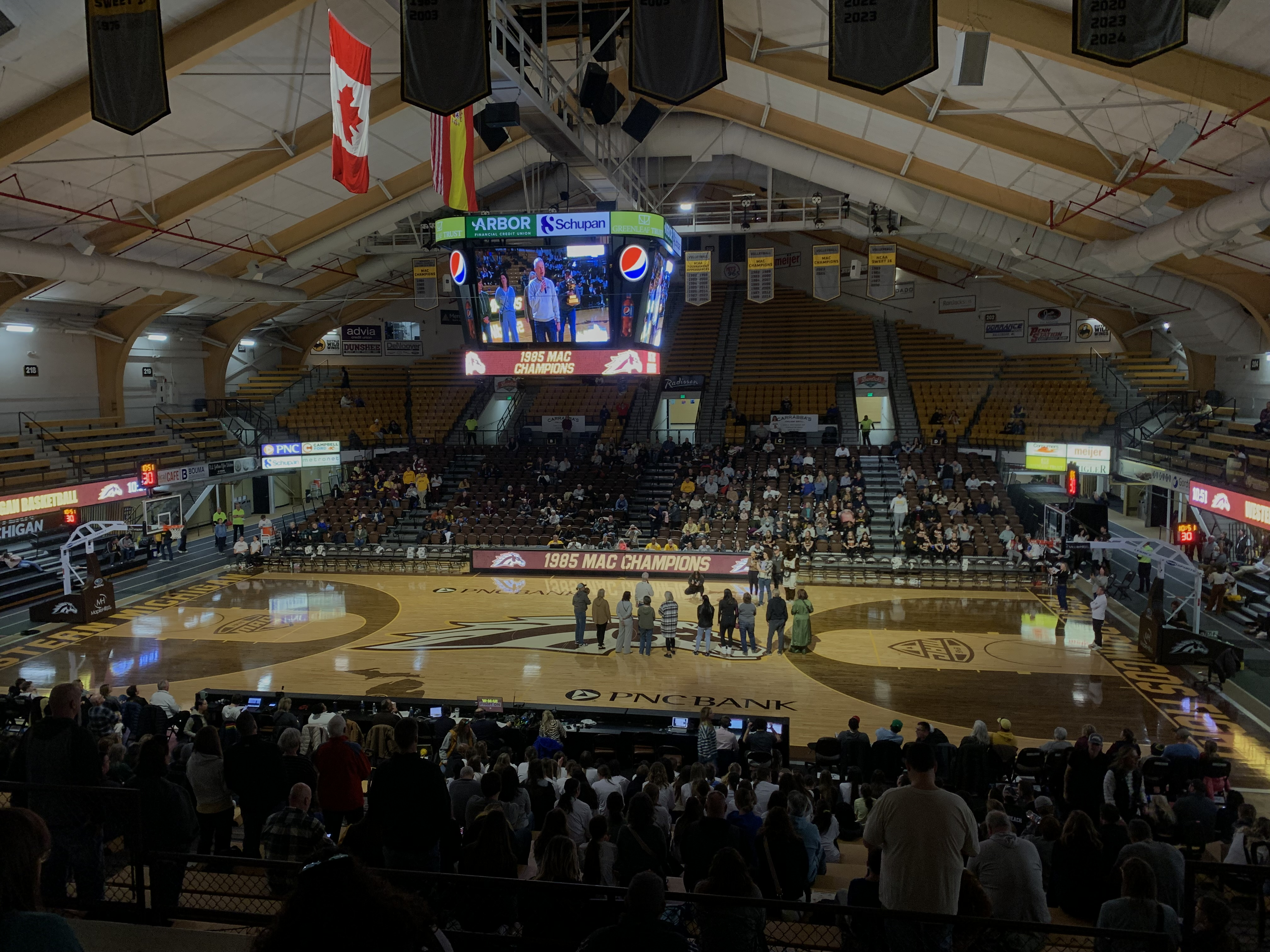
- Interior of University Arena, 2025
- Interactive map of University Arena
- Former names: Read Fieldhouse (1957–1994)
- Location: Kalamazoo, Michigan
- Coordinates: 42.283372°N 85.60845°W
- Owner: Western Michigan University
- Operator: Western Michigan University
- Capacity: 5,421

Construction
- Opened: 1957
- Renovated: 1994

Tenants
- Western Michigan Broncos (NCAA); Men's basketball (1957–present); Women's basketball (1973–present); Women's gymnastics (1975–present); Women's indoor track and field (1978–present); Women's volleyball (1977–present)

University Arena is a multi-purpose arena on the campus of Western Michigan University in Kalamazoo, Michigan, United States. Located in Read Fieldhouse, the arena opened in 1957 and is home to multiple Western Michigan Broncos athletic teams, including men's and women's basketball, women's gymnastics, women's indoor track and field, and women's volleyball. The facility seats 5,421 people. Read Fieldhouse was named for Buck Read, WMU head men's basketball coach from 1922 to 1949.

In 1994, University Arena went through a major renovation, adding 20,900 square feet (1,940 m^{2}) to bring the total to 114,900 square feet (10,670 m^{2}). The renovation included rotating the playing surface 90 degrees and reducing the seating capacity from over 10,000 to 5,421.

Before the basketball team moved into Read Fieldhouse, WMU played at Oakland Gymnasium from the 1938–39 season through the 1956–57 season.

In addition to hosting WMU basketball games, the arena also hosts high school basketball games between Kalamazoo Central and Kalamazoo Loy Norrix high schools twice a year as a neutral site.

== The Zoo ==
University Arena is home to The Zoo, Western Michigan's student section for basketball games. Formerly known as the Bronco Brigade, The Zoo was formed in 2003 and officially named in 2004.

== See also ==
- List of NCAA Division I basketball arenas
