= Kalamazoo County, Michigan =

County in the United States

- County
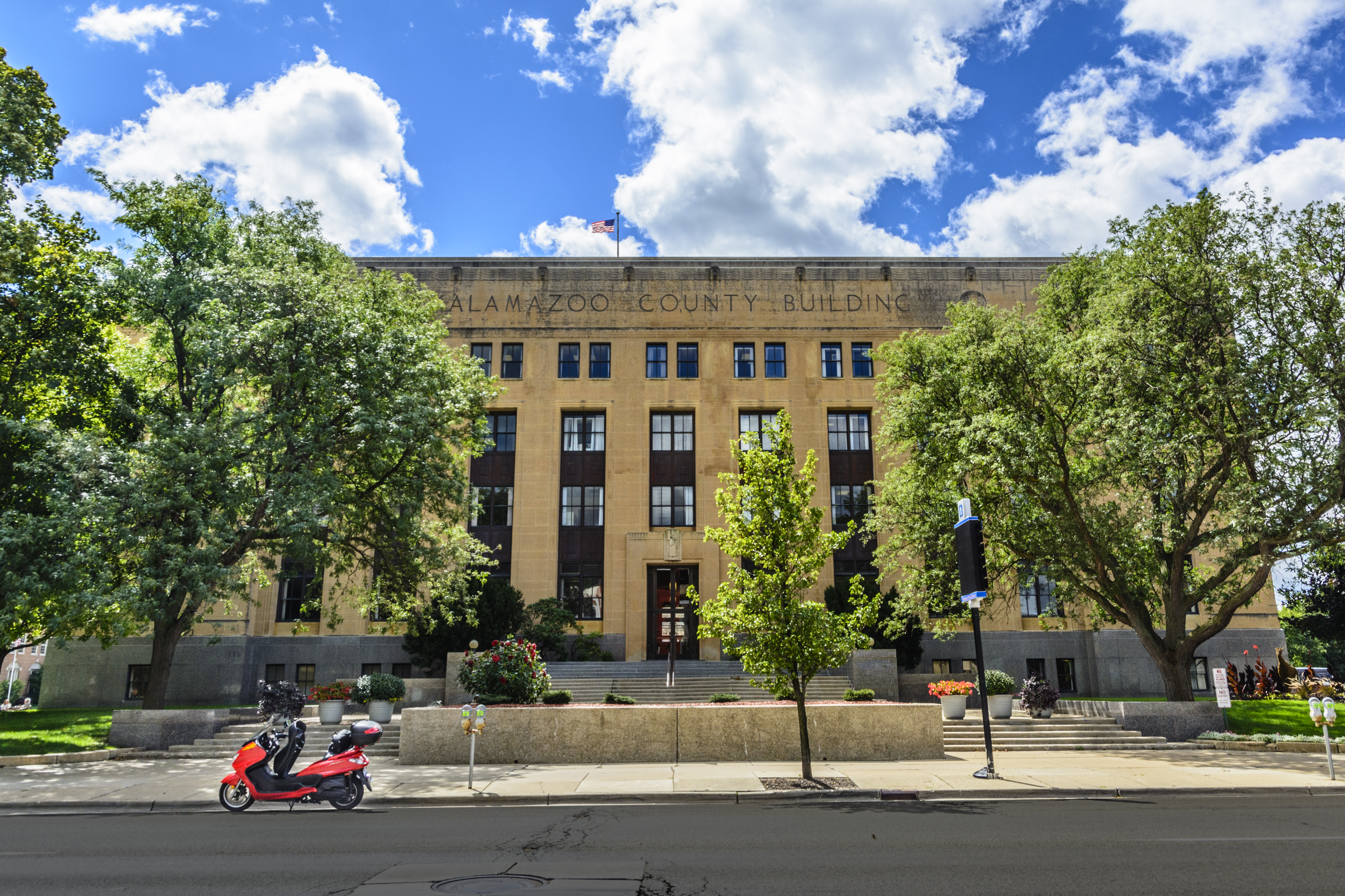
- Kalamazoo County Courthouse

- Location within the U.S. state of Michigan
- Coordinates: 42°14′N 85°32′W
- Country: United States
- State: Michigan
- Founded: May 7, 1830
- Seat: Kalamazoo
- Largest city: Kalamazoo

Area
  - Total: 580 sq mi (1,500 km^{2})
  - Land: 562 sq mi (1,460 km^{2})
  - Water: 19 sq mi (49 km^{2}) 3.2%

Population (2020)
  - Total: 261,670
  - Estimate (2025): 263,795 ▲
  - Density: 466/sq mi (180/km^{2})
- Time zone: UTC−5 (Eastern)
  - Summer (DST): UTC−4 (EDT)
- Congressional districts: 4th, 5th
- Website: www.kalcounty.gov

Kalamazoo County (/ˌkæləməˈzuː/ KAL-ə-mə-ZOO) is a county located in the U.S. state of Michigan. As of 2020, the population was 261,670. The county seat is Kalamazoo. Kalamazoo County is included in the Kalamazoo–Portage MI Metropolitan Statistical Area. 2015 estimates placed the metropolitan statistical area as the 151st largest among similarly designated areas in the United States. 2015 estimates place the combined statistical area 85th among similarly designated areas.

== Etymology ==
The name purportedly means "the mirage or reflecting river" and the original Indian name was "Kikalamazoo".

== Definitions ==
The Kalamazoo–Portage Metropolitan Area is a United States metropolitan area defined by the federal Office of Management and Budget (OMB) consisting of Kalamazoo County in western Michigan, anchored by the cities of Kalamazoo and Portage, located in Kalamazoo. As of the 2020 census, the Metropolitan Statistical Area (MSA) had a population of 261,670.

The Kalamazoo–Battle Creek–Portage Combined Statistical Area ties for 3rd largest CSA in the U.S. state of Michigan. As of the 2010 census, the CSA had a population of 524,030. The CSA combines the two population centers of Kalamazoo and Battle Creek. It includes two metropolitan areas, Kalamazoo in Kalamazoo County and Battle Creek in Calhoun County, and one micropolitan area, Sturgis in St. Joseph County.

== History ==
Kalamazoo County was organized in 1830, although its set off date is unknown. The village of Kalamazoo (then known as Bronson) was made the county seat in 1831.

== Geography ==
According to the U.S. Census Bureau, the county has a total area of 580 square miles (1,500 km^{2}), of which 562 square miles (1,460 km^{2}) is land and 19 square miles (49 km^{2}) (3.2%) is water.

=== Geographic features ===
- Kalamazoo River
- Portage River

=== Adjacent counties ===
- Barry County – northeast
- Allegan County – northwest
- Calhoun County – east
- Van Buren County – west
- Branch County – southeast
- St. Joseph County – south
- Cass County – southwest

== Transportation ==
=== Transit ===
- Kalamazoo Metro Transit
- Kalamazoo station

=== Air service ===
- The Kalamazoo & Battle Creek Metro Area is served by Kalamazoo/Battle Creek International Airport.

=== Highways ===
- I-94 runs east–west through center of county, passing three miles (4.8 km) south of Kalamazoo.
- BS I-94 runs from the far eastern side of Kalamazoo to an intersection with I-94 3.5 miles (5.6 km) southeast of Kalamazoo.
- US 131 runs north–south through the west-central part of the county.
- Bus. US 131 connects northern Kalamazoo to US 131.
- M-43 enters western side of the county 8.7 miles (14.0 km) south of the northwestern county corner. It runs eastward through Oshtemo Township and turns north at U.S. 131.
- M-89 enters the county near the midpoint of the northern county line. It runs southeasterly to and intersection with M-43 north of Richland and then runs eastward from Richland, exiting the county 3.4 miles (5.5 km) south of the northeastern county corner.
- M-96 starts on the far eastern side of Kalamazoo and runs eastward to Augusta before exiting the county 5.9 miles (9.5 km) south of the northeastern corner of the county.
- M-343 starts on the northeast side of Kalamazoo and runs along Gull Road to Richland.

== Demographics ==
Historical population
Census	Pop.	Note	%±
1840	7,380		—
1850	13,179		78.6%
1860	24,646		87.0%
1870	32,054		30.1%
1880	34,342		7.1%
1890	39,273		14.4%
1900	44,310		12.8%
1910	60,327		36.1%
1920	71,225		18.1%
1930	91,368		28.3%
1940	100,085		9.5%
1950	126,707		26.6%
1960	169,712		33.9%
1970	201,550		18.8%
1980	212,378		5.4%
1990	223,411		5.2%
2000	238,603		6.8%
2010	250,331		4.9%
2020	261,670		4.5%
2025 (est.)	263,795	▲	0.8%
U.S. Decennial Census; 1790–1960 1900–1990; 1990–2000 2010–2019

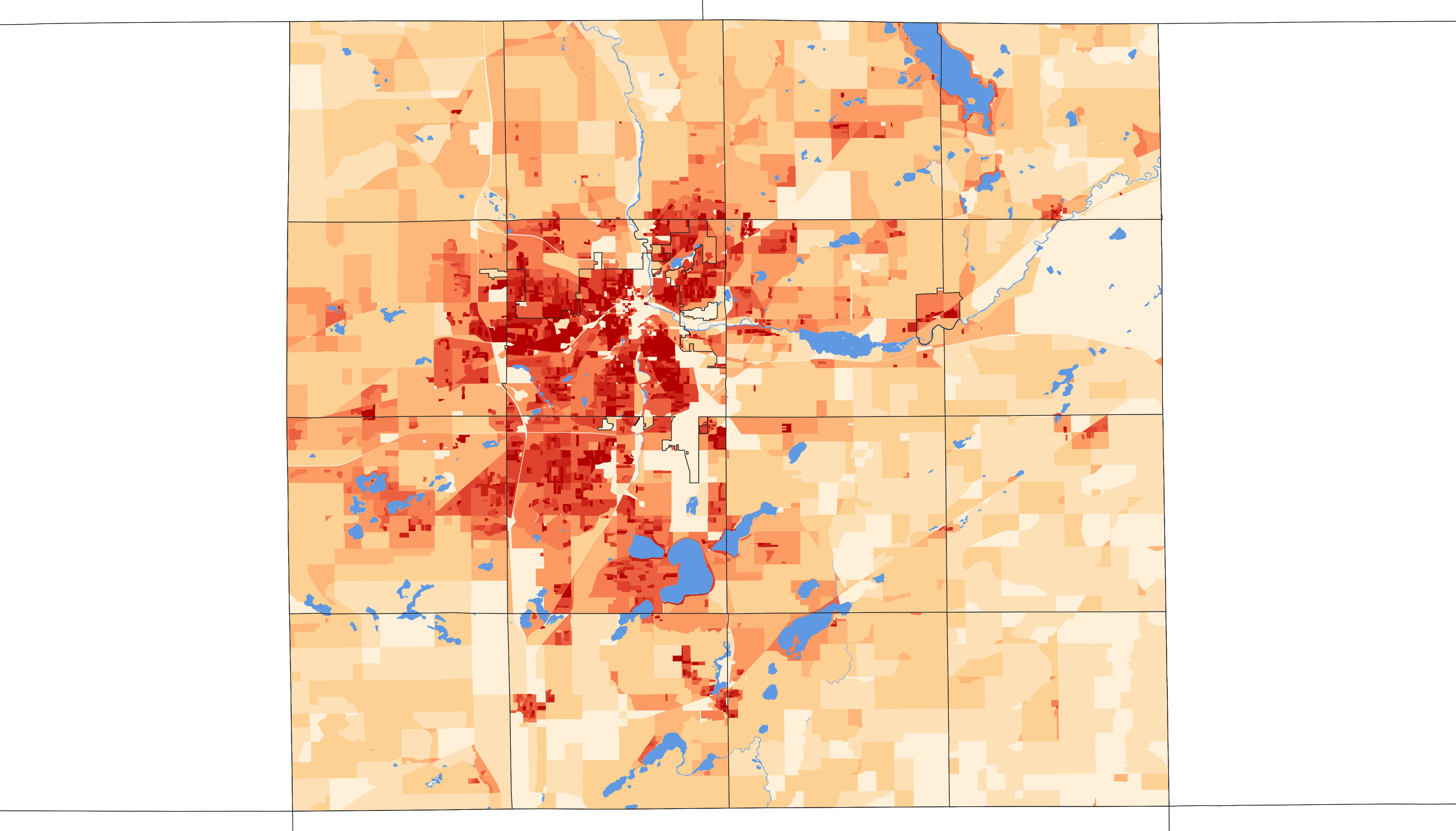
2020 population density of Kalamazoo County MI by census block

=== Racial and ethnic composition ===
Kalamazoo County, Michigan – Racial and ethnic composition Note: the US Census treats Hispanic/Latino as an ethnic category. This table excludes Latinos from the racial categories and assigns them to a separate category. Hispanics/Latinos may be of any race.
Race / Ethnicity (NH = Non-Hispanic)	Pop 1980	Pop 1990	Pop 2000	Pop 2010	Pop 2020	% 1980	% 1990	% 2000	% 2010	% 2020
White alone (NH)	190,925	195,481	199,180	200,047	193,428	89.90%	87.50%	83.48%	79.91%	73.92%
Black or African American alone (NH)	15,712	19,668	22,968	26,677	29,686	7.40%	8.80%	9.63%	10.66%	11.34%
Native American or Alaska Native alone (NH)	658	953	892	923	819	0.31%	0.43%	0.37%	0.37%	0.31%
Asian alone (NH)	1,417	3,124	4,343	5,186	6,983	0.67%	1.40%	1.82%	2.07%	2.67%
Native Hawaiian or Pacific Islander alone (NH)	x	x	72	73	57	x	x	0.03%	0.03%	0.02%
Other race alone (NH)	1,061	235	476	381	1,367	0.50%	0.11%	0.20%	0.15%	0.52%
Mixed race or Multiracial (NH)	x	x	4,361	7,085	14,554	x	x	1.83%	2.83%	5.56%
Hispanic or Latino (any race)	2,605	3,950	6,311	9,959	14,776	1.23%	1.77%	2.64%	3.98%	5.65%
Total	212,378	223,411	238,603	250,331	261,670	100.00%	100.00%	100.00%	100.00%	100.00%

=== 2020 census ===
As of the 2020 census, the county had a population of 261,670 and a median age of 36.2 years. 21.9% of residents were under the age of 18 and 16.3% of residents were 65 years of age or older.

For every 100 females there were 96.1 males, and for every 100 females age 18 and over there were 93.9 males age 18 and over.

The racial makeup of the county was 75.3% White, 11.6% Black or African American, 0.5% American Indian and Alaska Native, 2.7% Asian, <0.1% Native Hawaiian and Pacific Islander, 2.4% from some other race, and 7.5% from two or more races. Hispanic or Latino residents of any race comprised 5.6% of the population.

78.4% of residents lived in urban areas, while 21.6% lived in rural areas.

There were 106,906 households in the county, of which 27.7% had children under the age of 18 living in them. Of all households, 42.8% were married-couple households, 20.3% were households with a male householder and no spouse or partner present, and 28.8% were households with a female householder and no spouse or partner present. About 31.0% of all households were made up of individuals and 11.5% had someone living alone who was 65 years of age or older.

There were 114,021 housing units, of which 6.2% were vacant. Among occupied housing units, 63.7% were owner-occupied and 36.3% were renter-occupied. The homeowner vacancy rate was 1.2% and the rental vacancy rate was 7.2%.

=== 2010 census ===
As of the 2010 United States census, there were 250,331 people living in the county. 80.1% were non-Hispanic White, 11.1% Black or African American, 2.2% Asian, 0.5% Native American, and 3.0% of two or more races. 4.0% were Hispanic or Latino (of any race).

=== 2000 census ===
As of the 2000 United States census, there were 238,603 people, 93,479 households, and 57,956 families living in the county. The population density was 425 inhabitants per square mile (164/km^{2}). There were 99,250 housing units at an average density of 177 per square mile (68/km^{2}). The racial makeup of the county was 84.57% White, 9.73% Black or African American, 0.41% Native American, 1.83% Asian, 0.03% Pacific Islander, 1.27% from other races, and 2.15% from two or more races. 2.64% of the population were Hispanic or Latino of any race. 18.3% were of German, 11.5% Dutch, 10.3% English, 8.4% Irish and 7.2% American ancestry according to Census 2000. 93.7% spoke English and 2.8% Spanish as their first language.

There were 93,479 households, out of which 30.40% had children under the age of 18 living with them, 47.70% were married couples living together, 11.00% had a female householder with no husband present, and 38.00% were non-families. 28.00% of all households were made up of individuals, and 8.50% had someone living alone who was 65 years of age or older. The average household size was 2.43 and the average family size was 3.00.

The county population contained 24.10% under the age of 18, 15.20% from 18 to 24, 28.20% from 25 to 44, 21.10% from 45 to 64, and 11.40% who were 65 years of age or older. The median age was 33 years. For every 100 females, there were 93.60 males. For every 100 females age 18 and over, there were 90.50 males.

The median income for a household in the county was $42,022, and the median income for a family was $53,953. Males had a median income of $39,611 versus $27,965 for females. The per capita income for the county was $21,739. About 6.50% of families and 12.00% of the population were below the poverty line, including 12.30% of those under age 18 and 6.30% of those age 65 or over.

== Government ==
Kalamazoo County was a bastion of the Republican Party following the Civil War. From 1884 through 1988, voters selected the Republican Party presidential nominee all but three times–in 1912, 1936 and 1964. However, starting in 1992 the county has voted Democratic in every presidential election (through 2024). It swung particularly heavily to the Democrats after 2008, following the trend in most urban counties across the country. Even as Michigan trended Republican in 2016, Kalamazoo County voted for Democratic candidate to a similar level as in recent years.

United States presidential election results for Kalamazoo County, Michigan
Year	Republican		Democratic		Third party(ies)	
Year	No.	%	No.	%	No.	%
1884	4,515	51.78%	3,750	43.00%	455	5.22%
1888	5,437	54.66%	3,950	39.71%	560	5.63%
1892	4,968	50.56%	4,018	40.90%	839	8.54%
1896	5,891	51.16%	5,434	47.19%	190	1.65%
1900	6,010	53.62%	4,707	41.99%	492	4.39%
1904	7,163	62.34%	3,264	28.40%	1,064	9.26%
1908	6,511	54.63%	4,477	37.57%	930	7.80%
1912	2,642	21.47%	3,660	29.74%	6,006	48.80%
1916	5,951	41.99%	7,164	50.55%	1,058	7.46%
1920	13,765	67.53%	5,271	25.86%	1,348	6.61%
1924	18,451	75.31%	3,587	14.64%	2,462	10.05%
1928	23,626	79.20%	5,946	19.93%	258	0.86%
1932	18,584	55.01%	13,974	41.36%	1,227	3.63%
1936	17,824	47.68%	17,870	47.81%	1,686	4.51%
1940	25,596	58.68%	17,733	40.65%	293	0.67%
1944	24,974	59.96%	16,223	38.95%	457	1.10%
1948	23,799	57.32%	16,393	39.49%	1,325	3.19%
1952	38,847	66.76%	18,967	32.60%	371	0.64%
1956	43,305	70.49%	17,808	28.99%	320	0.52%
1960	42,800	63.47%	24,286	36.01%	348	0.52%
1964	27,100	39.79%	40,789	59.89%	215	0.32%
1968	39,796	53.90%	26,437	35.81%	7,599	10.29%
1972	50,405	58.77%	33,324	38.85%	2,041	2.38%
1976	51,462	59.09%	33,411	38.37%	2,212	2.54%
1980	48,669	50.90%	34,528	36.11%	12,420	12.99%
1984	58,327	63.82%	32,460	35.52%	601	0.66%
1988	50,205	55.64%	39,457	43.73%	573	0.64%
1992	38,035	36.62%	43,568	41.95%	22,255	21.43%
1996	40,703	43.70%	45,644	49.01%	6,788	7.29%
2000	48,254	47.94%	48,807	48.49%	3,595	3.57%
2004	57,147	47.71%	61,462	51.31%	1,174	0.98%
2008	51,554	39.34%	77,051	58.79%	2,456	1.87%
2012	52,662	42.58%	69,051	55.83%	1,977	1.60%
2016	51,034	40.41%	67,148	53.17%	8,117	6.43%
2020	56,823	39.53%	83,686	58.22%	3,237	2.25%
2024	58,671	40.27%	84,501	57.99%	2,538	1.74%

United States Senate election results for Kalamazoo County, Michigan1
Year	Republican		Democratic		Third party(ies)	
Year	No.	%	No.	%	No.	%
2024	57,478	39.93%	81,996	56.97%	4,460	3.10%

Michigan Gubernatorial election results for Kalamazoo County
Year	Republican		Democratic		Third party(ies)	
Year	No.	%	No.	%	No.	%
2022	42,436	36.34%	72,516	62.10%	1,824	1.56%

The county government operates the jail, provides law enforcement in unincorporated areas, maintains rural roads, operates the major local courts, keeps files of deeds and mortgages, maintains vital records, administers public health regulations, and participates with the state in the provision of welfare and other social services. The county board of commissioners controls the budget but has only limited authority to make laws or ordinances. In Michigan, most local government functions—fire, building and zoning, tax assessment, street maintenance, etc.—are the responsibility of individual cities and townships.

=== Elected officials ===
- Prosecuting Attorney: Jeffrey S. Getting (Democrat)
- Sheriff: Richard Fuller (Democrat)
- County Clerk/Register of Deeds: Meredith Place (Democrat)
- County Treasurer: Thomas L. Whitener (Democrat)
- Drain Commissioner: Jason Wiersma (Democrat)
- County Surveyor: Gary D. Hahn (Democrat)
- County Commissioner for District 1: Tami Rey (Democrat)
- County Commissioner for District 2: Jen Strebs (Democrat)
- County Commissioner for District 3: Monteze Morales (Democrat)
- County Commissioner for District 4: Abigail Wheeler (Democrat)
- County Commissioner for District 5: John Taylor (Democrat)
- County Commissioner for District 6: John H. Gisler (Republican)
- County Commissioner for District 7: Jeff Hepler (Republican)
- County Commissioner for District 8: Wendy Mazer (Republican)
- County Commissioner for District 9: Dale Deleeuw (Democrat)
- Eighth District Court: Judges Tiffany A. Ankley, Christopher Haenicke, Kathleen Hemingway, Alisa L. Parker-LaGrone, Richard A. Santoni, Ronald Schafer, Namita Sharma, and Vincent C. Westra (all non-partisan)
- Ninth Circuit Court: Judges Curtis J. Bell, Paul J. Bridenstine, Gary C. Giguere Jr., Stephen G. Gorsalitz, Pamela L. Lightvoet, Alexander C. Lipsey, Namita Sharma, and Scott Pierangeli (all non-partisan).

(information current as of October 2022)

== Communities ==
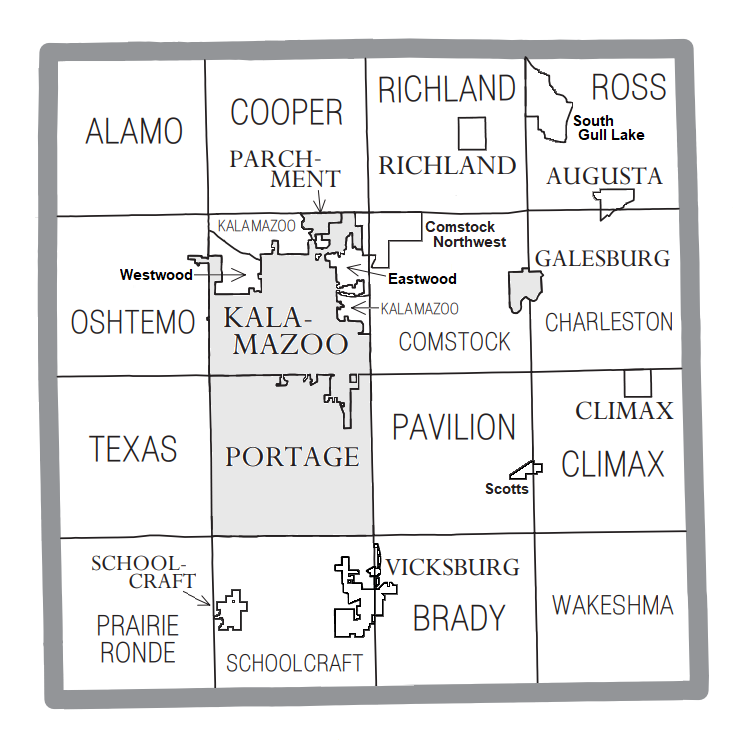
U.S. Census data map showing local municipal boundaries within Kalamazoo County, as well as CDP boundaries. Shaded areas represent incorporated cities.

=== Cities ===
- Galesburg
- Kalamazoo (county seat)
- Parchment
- Portage

=== Villages ===
- Augusta
- Climax
- Richland
- Schoolcraft
- Vicksburg

=== Charter townships ===
- Brady Charter Township
- Comstock Charter Township
- Cooper Charter Township
- Kalamazoo Charter Township
- Oshtemo Charter Township
- Pavilion Charter Township
- Texas Charter Township

=== Civil townships ===
- Alamo Township
- Charleston Township
- Climax Township
- Prairie Ronde Township
- Richland Township
- Ross Township
- Schoolcraft Township
- Wakeshma Township

=== Census-designated places ===
- Comstock Northwest
- Eastwood
- Greater Galesburg (former)
- Scotts
- South Gull Lake
- Westwood

=== Other unincorporated communities ===
- Adams Park
- Alamo
- Collins Corner
- Comstock
- Cooks Mill
- Cooper
- Doughertys Corners
- East Comstock
- East Cooper
- Factoryville
- Fulton
- Gardners Corners
- Gull Lake
- Highland Park
- Howlandsburg
- Lakewood
- Lawndale
- Lemon Park
- Midland Park
- Milwood
- Northwood
- Oakwood
- Pavilion
- Pavillion Center
- Pomeroy
- Ramona Park
- Richland Junction
- Texas Corners
- Yorkville

== See also ==
- List of Michigan State Historic Sites in Kalamazoo County
- National Register of Historic Places listings in Kalamazoo County, Michigan
