= Loy Norrix High School =

Location
- 606 East Kilgore; Kalamazoo, Michigan 49001; United States; 42°14′37″N 85°34′20″W

Information
- School type: Public high school
- Founded: 1961
- School district: Kalamazoo Public Schools
- Superintendent: Darrin Slade
- Principal: Christopher Aguinaga
- Teaching staff: 79.71 (FTE)
- Grades: 9—12
- Enrollment: 1,785 (2024–2025)
- Student to teacher ratio: 22.39
- Colors: Blue and white
- Nickname: Knights
- Newspaper: Knight Life
- Yearbook: Accolade
- Website: loynorrix.kalamazoopublicschools.com

Loy Norrix High School is a high school located in Kalamazoo, Michigan, serving students from grades nine through twelve. It is one of two high schools in the Kalamazoo Public Schools district. The student body totals at approximately 1,550. The school is named for a former superintendent of Kalamazoo Public Schools and opened in 1961. Loy Norrix students are eligible for the Kalamazoo Promise, which provides reduced or free college tuition for students attending public and private colleges in Michigan.

== History ==
Loy Norrix opened in 1961 after Kalamazoo Central High School graduated 799 students the year prior, the largest graduating class to that date. The building was designed by Chicago architecture firm Perkins&Will.

== Notable alumni ==
- T. J. Duckett- Class of 1999. Professional football player
- David Means - Class of 1980, author, O Henry Award winner.
- Tim Nordwind- Class of 1994 musician- Bass Player "OK GO"
- Jerome T. Youngman - Class of 1969, Musician, Producer, Composer
- Bob Wood - Class of 1975, author and activist.
- James Leo Ryan - Class of 1981, Actor, Broadway, Off-Broadway, Movies and Television
- Shana Cleveland - Class of 1999, musician. Lead guitarist and vocalist for surf rock band La Luz (band).

== See also ==
- Kalamazoo Public Schools
- Kalamazoo Promise
