= Eastwood, Michigan =

- Census-designated place (CDP) & unincorporated community
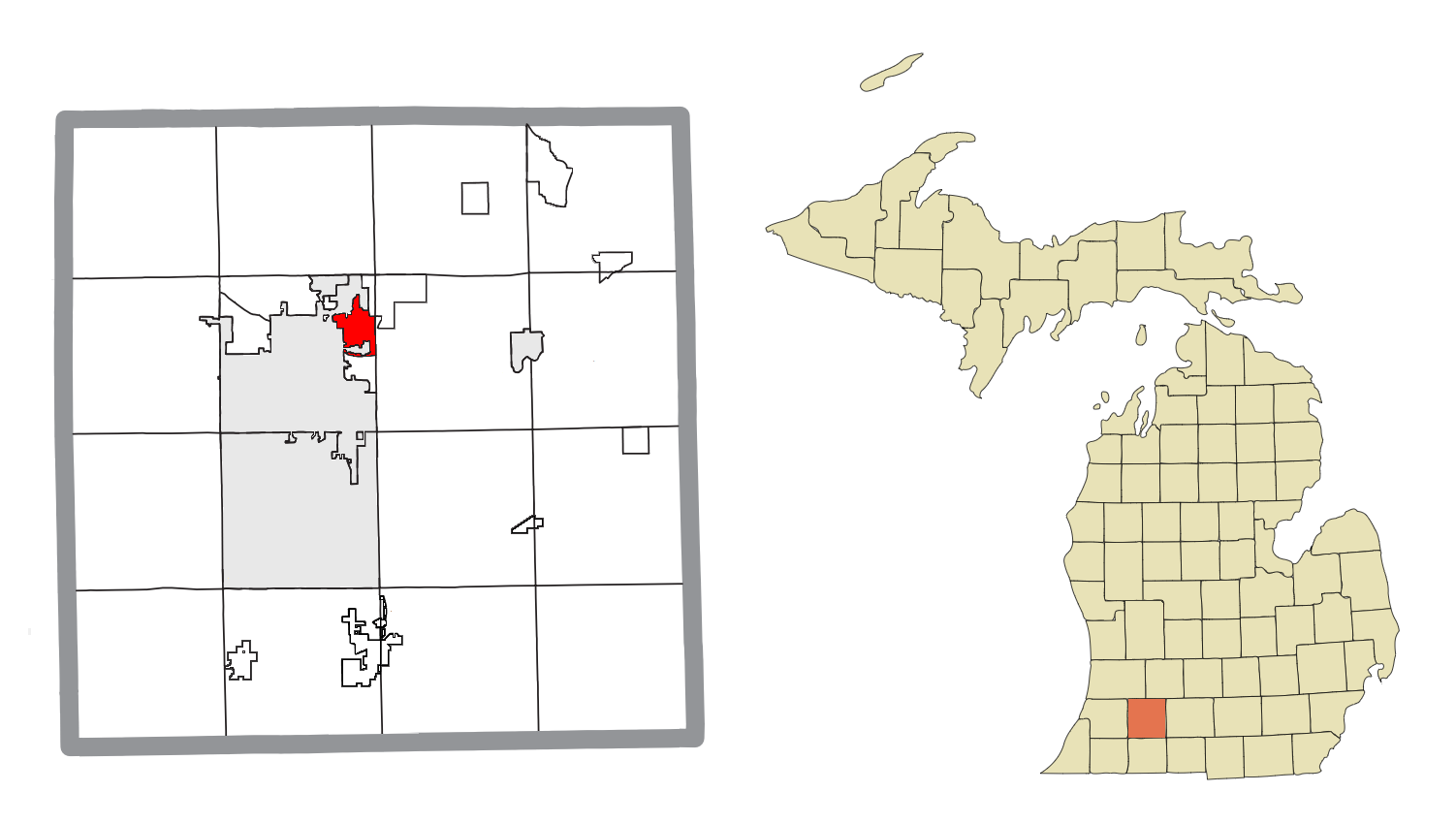
- Location within Kalamazoo County

- Location within the state of Michigan Location within the United States
- Coordinates: 42°18′11″N 85°33′1″W
- Country: United States
- State: Michigan
- County: Kalamazoo
- Township: Kalamazoo Charter Township

Area
  - Total: 1.97 sq mi (5.10 km^{2})
  - Land: 1.96 sq mi (5.07 km^{2})
  - Water: 0.012 sq mi (0.03 km^{2})
- Elevation: 860 ft (262 m)

Population (2020)
  - Total: 6,366
  - Density: 3,253.4/sq mi (1,256.13/km^{2})
- Time zone: UTC-5 (Eastern (EST))
  - Summer (DST): UTC-4 (EDT)
- ZIP code: 49048
- Area code: 269
- FIPS code: 26-24500
- GNIS feature ID: 0625303

Eastwood is an unincorporated community in Kalamazoo Charter Township, Kalamazoo County in the U.S. state of Michigan. It is a census-designated place (CDP) for statistical purposes and does not have any legal status as an incorporated municipality. As of the 2020 census, Eastwood had a population of 6,366.

== Geography ==
Eastwood is in north-central Kalamazoo County, in the eastern part of Kalamazoo Charter Township. It is bordered to the north, west, and south by the city of Kalamazoo and to the east by Comstock Charter Township. According to the United States Census Bureau, the CDP has a total area of 2.0 square miles (5.1 km^{2}), of which 0.01 square miles (0.03 km^{2}), or 0.65%, are water.

== Demographics ==
Historical population
Census	Pop.	Note	%±
2020	6,366		—
U.S. Decennial Census

=== 2020 census ===
As of the 2020 census, Eastwood had a population of 6,366. The median age was 34.7 years. 24.9% of residents were under the age of 18 and 11.2% of residents were 65 years of age or older. For every 100 females there were 98.7 males, and for every 100 females age 18 and over there were 93.6 males age 18 and over.

100.0% of residents lived in urban areas, while 0.0% lived in rural areas.

There were 2,667 households in Eastwood, of which 31.9% had children under the age of 18 living in them. Of all households, 29.7% were married-couple households, 23.8% were households with a male householder and no spouse or partner present, and 35.2% were households with a female householder and no spouse or partner present. About 33.4% of all households were made up of individuals and 8.5% had someone living alone who was 65 years of age or older.

There were 2,830 housing units, of which 5.8% were vacant. The homeowner vacancy rate was 2.4% and the rental vacancy rate was 5.7%.

Racial composition as of the 2020 census
Race	Number	Percent
White	3,530	55.5%
Black or African American	1,873	29.4%
American Indian and Alaska Native	55	0.9%
Asian	25	0.4%
Native Hawaiian and Other Pacific Islander	7	0.1%
Some other race	252	4.0%
Two or more races	624	9.8%
Hispanic or Latino (of any race)	553	8.7%

=== 2000 census ===
As of the 2000 census, there were 6,265 people, 2,572 households, and 1,527 families residing in the CDP. The population density was 3,139.3 inhabitants per square mile (1,212.1/km^{2}). There were 2,778 housing units at an average density of 1,392.0 per square mile (537.5/km^{2}). The racial makeup of the CDP was 74.96% White, 19.27% Black or African American, 0.29% Native American, 0.83% Asian, 0.05% Pacific Islander, 1.74% from other races, and 2.87% from two or more races. Hispanic or Latino of any race were 3.61% of the population.

There were 2,572 households, out of which 30.3% had children under the age of 18 living with them, 39.3% were married couples living together, 14.8% had a female householder with no husband present, and 40.6% were non-families. 30.4% of all households were made up of individuals, and 8.4% had someone living alone who was 65 years of age or older. The average household size was 2.37 and the average family size was 2.95.

In the CDP, the population was spread out, with 25.0% under the age of 18, 11.2% from 18 to 24, 32.5% from 25 to 44, 18.4% from 45 to 64, and 12.9% who were 65 years of age or older. The median age was 32 years. For every 100 females, there were 87.9 males. For every 100 females age 18 and over, there were 85.3 males.

The median income for a household in the CDP was $35,763, and the median income for a family was $40,208. Males had a median income of $33,895 versus $24,574 for females. The per capita income for the CDP was $17,313. About 9.5% of families and 12.1% of the population were below the poverty line, including 15.8% of those under age 18 and 3.8% of those age 65 or over.

== Education ==
Some portions are in Kalamazoo Public Schools while others are in Comstock Public Schools.
