= Westwood, Michigan =

- Census-designated place (CDP) & unincorporated community
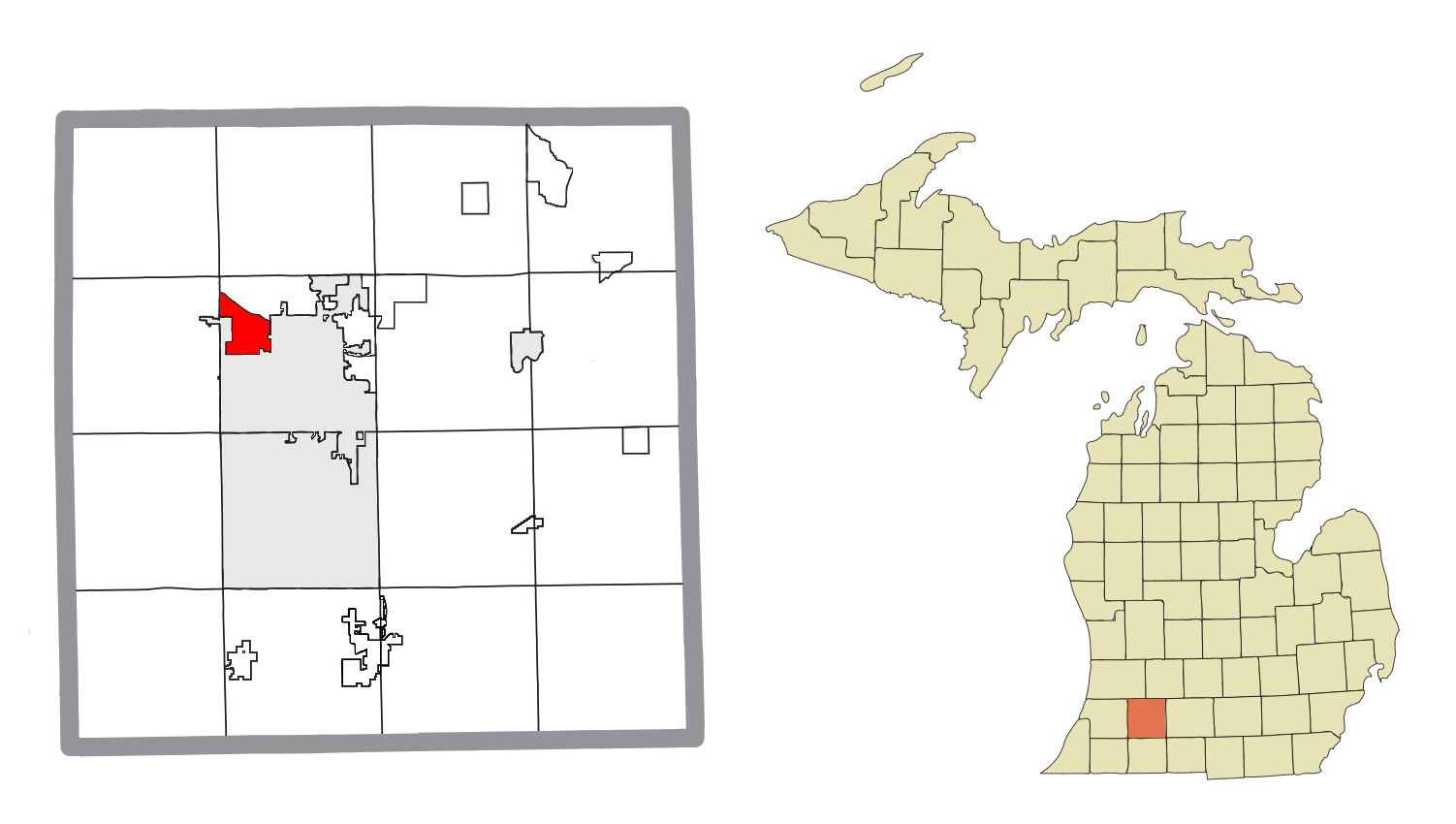
- Location within Kalamazoo County

- Location within the state of Michigan Location within the United States
- Coordinates: 42°18′10″N 85°38′1″W
- Country: United States
- State: Michigan
- County: Kalamazoo
- Township: Kalamazoo Charter Township

Area
  - Total: 2.85 sq mi (7.39 km^{2})
  - Land: 2.85 sq mi (7.39 km^{2})
  - Water: 0 sq mi (0.00 km^{2})
- Elevation: 942 ft (287 m)

Population (2020)
  - Total: 9,621
  - Density: 3,373.5/sq mi (1,302.53/km^{2})
- Time zone: UTC-5 (Eastern (EST))
  - Summer (DST): UTC-4 (EDT)
- ZIP codes: 49006, 49009
- Area code: 269
- FIPS code: 26-86380
- GNIS feature ID: 1616231

Westwood is an unincorporated community in Kalamazoo Charter Township, Kalamazoo County in the U.S. state of Michigan. It is a census-designated place (CDP) for statistical purposes and does not have any legal status as an incorporated municipality. As of the 2020 census, Westwood had a population of 9,621.

== Geography ==
Westwood is in the western part of Kalamazoo Charter Township and is bordered to the south, east, and west by the city of Kalamazoo. M-43 is a state highway that runs through the southern part of the community, leading east into downtown Kalamazoo and west 35 miles (56 km) to South Haven on Lake Michigan.

According to the United States Census Bureau, the Westwood CDP has a total area of 2.9 square miles (7.4 km^{2}), all land.

== Demographics ==
Historical population
Census	Pop.	Note	%±
2020	9,621		—
U.S. Decennial Census

=== 2020 census ===
As of the 2020 census, Westwood had a population of 9,621. The median age was 34.4 years. 17.2% of residents were under the age of 18 and 17.5% of residents were 65 years of age or older. For every 100 females there were 91.6 males, and for every 100 females age 18 and over there were 89.7 males age 18 and over.

100.0% of residents lived in urban areas, while 0.0% lived in rural areas.

There were 4,448 households in Westwood, of which 21.0% had children under the age of 18 living in them. Of all households, 34.1% were married-couple households, 21.7% were households with a male householder and no spouse or partner present, and 35.3% were households with a female householder and no spouse or partner present. About 36.1% of all households were made up of individuals and 14.5% had someone living alone who was 65 years of age or older.

There were 4,755 housing units, of which 6.5% were vacant. The homeowner vacancy rate was 0.7% and the rental vacancy rate was 8.1%.

Racial composition as of the 2020 census
Race	Number	Percent
White	7,012	72.9%
Black or African American	1,270	13.2%
American Indian and Alaska Native	45	0.5%
Asian	404	4.2%
Native Hawaiian and Other Pacific Islander	2	0.0%
Some other race	186	1.9%
Two or more races	702	7.3%
Hispanic or Latino (of any race)	492	5.1%

=== 2000 census ===
As of the 2000 census, there were 9,122 people, 4,340 households, and 2,087 families residing in the CDP. The population density was 3,258.0 inhabitants per square mile (1,257.9/km^{2}). There were 4,505 housing units at an average density of 1,609.0 per square mile (621.2/km^{2}). The racial makeup of the CDP was 85.26% White, 10.59% Black or African American, 0.14% Native American, 1.57% Asian, 0.01% Pacific Islander, 0.71% from other races, and 1.72% from two or more races. Hispanic or Latino of any race were 1.37% of the population.

There were 4,340 households, out of which 19.1% had children under the age of 18 living with them, 37.7% were married couples living together, 7.7% had a female householder with no husband present, and 51.9% were non-families. 35.7% of all households were made up of individuals, and 13.7% had someone living alone who was 65 years of age or older. The average household size was 2.10 and the average family size was 2.78.

In the CDP, the population was spread out, with 17.3% under the age of 18, 20.2% from 18 to 24, 26.6% from 25 to 44, 19.0% from 45 to 64, and 16.8% who were 65 years of age or older. The median age was 33 years. For every 100 females, there were 85.7 males. For every 100 females age 18 and over, there were 82.1 males.

The median income for a household in the CDP was $37,407, and the median income for a family was $53,491. Males had a median income of $38,214 versus $31,062 for females. The per capita income for the CDP was $22,686. About 3.5% of families and 12.7% of the population were below the poverty line, including 7.9% of those under age 18 and 2.4% of those age 65 or over.

== Education ==
It is zoned to Kalamazoo Public Schools.
