= Richland, Michigan =

- Village
- Village of Richland
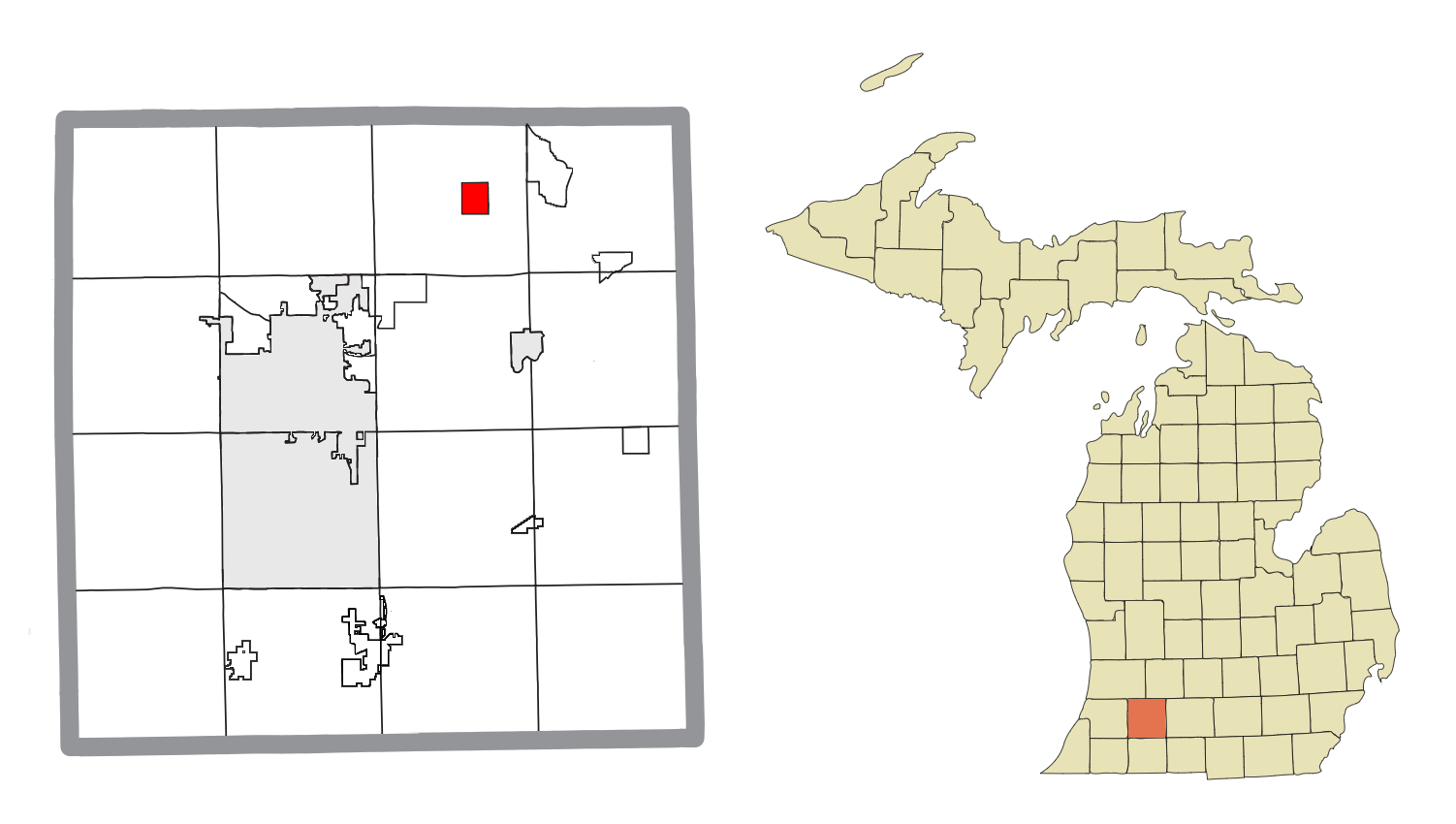
- Location within Kalamazoo County

- Location within the state of Michigan Location within the United States
- Coordinates: 42°22′35″N 85°27′20″W
- Country: United States
- State: Michigan
- County: Kalamazoo
- Township: Richland

Area
  - Total: 1.02 sq mi (2.63 km^{2})
  - Land: 1.02 sq mi (2.63 km^{2})
  - Water: 0 sq mi (0.00 km^{2})
- Elevation: 928 ft (283 m)

Population (2020)
  - Total: 946
  - Density: 932.3/sq mi (359.98/km^{2})
- Time zone: UTC-5 (Eastern (EST))
  - Summer (DST): UTC-4 (EDT)
- ZIP code: 49083
- Area code: 269
- FIPS code: 26-68240
- GNIS feature ID: 0635881
- Website: villageofrichland.org

Richland is a village in Kalamazoo County in the U.S. state of Michigan. As of the 2020 census, Richland had a population of 946.

The village is within Richland Township, about 9 miles (14 km) northeast of Kalamazoo.

== Geography ==
According to the United States Census Bureau, the village has a total area of 1.01 square miles (2.62 km^{2}), all land.

== Demographics ==
Historical population
Census	Pop.	Note	%±
1880	223		—
1890	293		31.4%
1900	312		6.5%
1910	278		−10.9%
1920	283		1.8%
1930	304		7.4%
1940	327		7.6%
1950	389		19.0%
1960	511		31.4%
1970	728		42.5%
1980	486		−33.2%
1990	465		−4.3%
2000	593		27.5%
2010	751		26.6%
2020	946		26.0%
U.S. Decennial Census

=== 2010 census ===
As of the census of 2010, there were 751 people, 347 households, and 221 families living in the village. The population density was 743.6 inhabitants per square mile (287.1/km^{2}). There were 376 housing units at an average density of 372.3 per square mile (143.7/km^{2}). The racial makeup of the village was 94.7% White, 0.4% African American, 1.2% Asian, 0.3% from other races, and 3.5% from two or more races. Hispanic or Latino of any race were 1.5% of the population.

There were 347 households, of which 24.8% had children under the age of 18 living with them, 52.4% were married couples living together, 8.9% had a female householder with no husband present, 2.3% had a male householder with no wife present, and 36.3% were non-families. 33.7% of all households were made up of individuals, and 19.6% had someone living alone who was 65 years of age or older. The average household size was 2.16 and the average family size was 2.75.

The median age in the village was 46.8 years. 21.6% of residents were under the age of 18; 4.1% were between the ages of 18 and 24; 20.9% were from 25 to 44; 31.4% were from 45 to 64; and 22.1% were 65 years of age or older. The gender makeup of the village was 43.9% male and 56.1% female.

=== 2000 census ===
As of the census of 2000, there were 593 people, 258 households, and 170 families living in the village. The population density was 494.4 inhabitants per square mile (190.9/km^{2}). There were 301 housing units at an average density of 251.0 per square mile (96.9/km^{2}). The racial makeup of the village was 96.29% White, 0.17% African American, 0.17% Native American, 1.35% Asian, 0.17% from other races, and 1.85% from two or more races. Hispanic or Latino of any race were 1.52% of the population.

There were 258 households, out of which 29.5% had children under the age of 18 living with them, 54.7% were married couples living together, 8.1% had a female householder with no husband present, and 34.1% were non-families. 29.5% of all households were made up of individuals, and 14.3% had someone living alone who was 65 years of age or older. The average household size was 2.30 and the average family size was 2.84.

In the village, the population was spread out, with 24.6% under the age of 18, 5.1% from 18 to 24, 26.8% from 25 to 44, 26.3% from 45 to 64, and 17.2% who were 65 years of age or older. The median age was 43 years. For every 100 females, there were 80.2 males. For every 100 females age 18 and over, there were 78.1 males.

The median income for a household in the village was $50,938, and the median income for a family was $58,542. Males had a median income of $42,250 versus $30,956 for females. The per capita income for the village was $23,777. About 1.2% of families and 1.4% of the population were below the poverty line, including none of those under age 18 and 7.5% of those age 65 or over.

== History ==
Richland is located in the middle of what was once the Gull Prairie, an upland area relatively free of trees and maintained by natural and man-made fires. The area had a few Pottawatamie villages, one was located on the west side of nearby Gull Lake. Fish and game were plentiful, and the land was very fertile. Since there were few trees to clear, the prairie was among the first areas of Kalamazoo County to be settled. By the 1830s, the Native Americans had been forced west, and Richland was a thriving frontier village. The village even contended with Prairie Ronde for the county seat, but the centrally located village of Bronson (now Kalamazoo) was ultimately chosen.

Lacking a flowing stream that would have provided water power, Richland never developed significant industry and remained a sleepy farm community until the late twentieth century. In the 1980s and 1990s, small employers such as Richard Allen Medical moved to the edge of town, and Richland became a bedroom community for Kalamazoo. The high quality of the local Gull Lake School District also drew people from surrounding areas. New subdivisions were built in what had been hilly farm country.

== Notable people ==
Brothers Charles S. May and Dwight May, both lieutenant governors of Michigan during the 19th Century, were raised in Richland.

== Education ==
- Richland Elementary School
- Thomas M. Ryan Intermediate School
- Gull Lake Middle School
- Gull Lake High School
- The Montessori School - Preschool
- Light of Christ Academy
