= Comstock Township, Michigan =

- Charter township
- Charter Township of Comstock
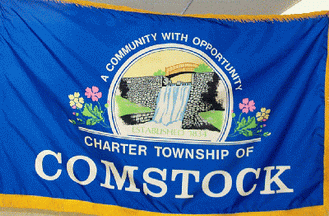
- Flag
- Nickname: Comstock
- Motto: "A Community with Opportunity"
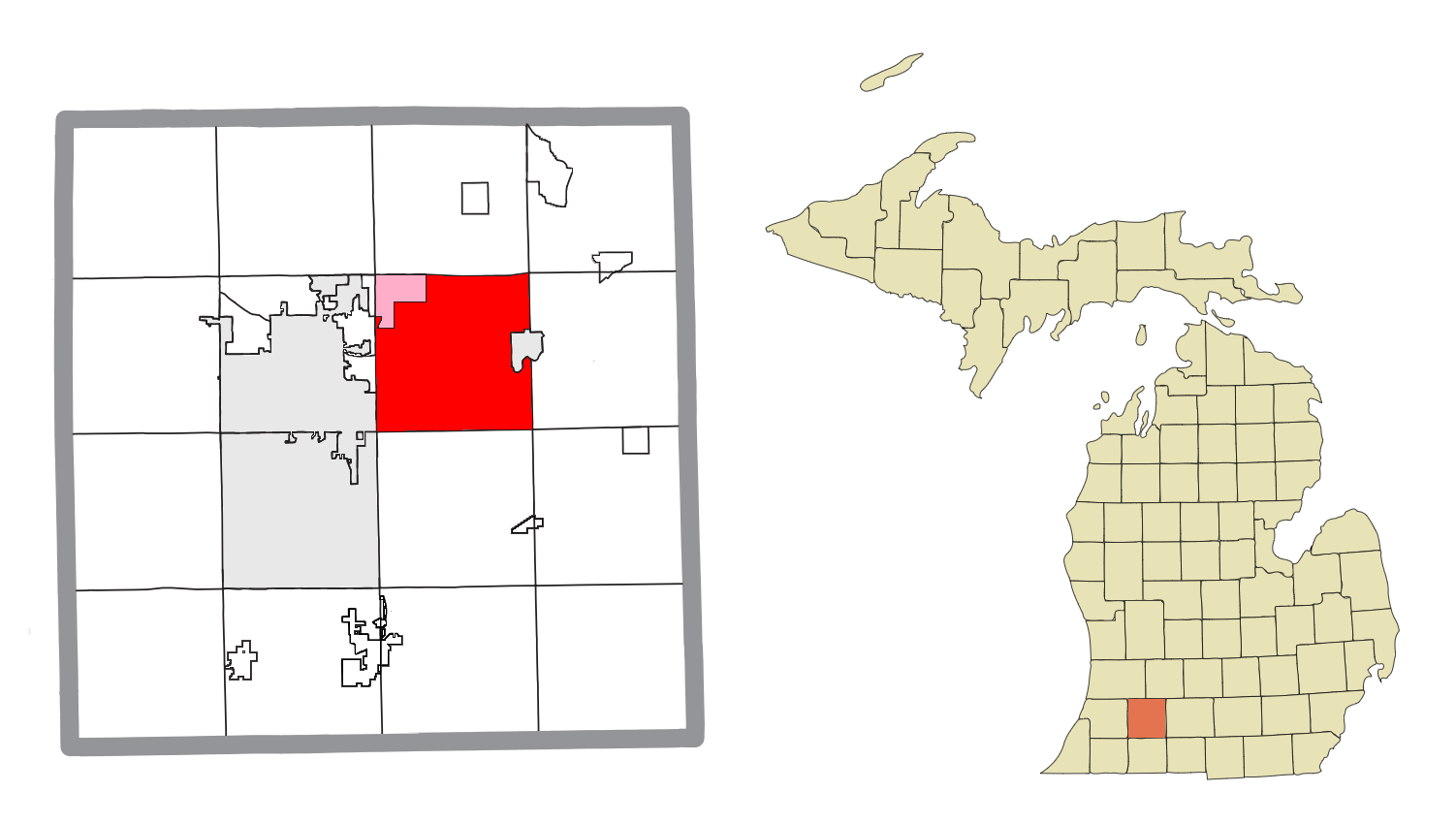
- Location within Kalamazoo County and an administered portion of the CDP of Comstock Northwest

- Location within the state of Michigan Location within the United States
- Coordinates: 42°17′49″N 85°29′56″W
- Country: United States
- State: Michigan
- County: Kalamazoo
- Organized: 1834

Government
  - Type: Charter township
  - Supervisor: Benjamin Martin
  - Clerk: Nicole Beauchamp
  - Treasurer: Sandra Bloomfield

Area
  - Total: 35.3 sq mi (91.3 km^{2})
  - Land: 33.3 sq mi (86.3 km^{2})
  - Water: 1.9 sq mi (5.0 km^{2})
- Elevation: 810 ft (247 m)

Population (2020)
  - Total: 15,231
  - Density: 457/sq mi (176/km^{2})
- Time zone: UTC-5 (Eastern (EST))
  - Summer (DST): UTC-4 (EDT)
- ZIP codes: 49041 (Comstock P.O. Box); 49048 (Kalamazoo); 49053 (Galesburg)
- Area code: 269
- FIPS code: 26-077-17680
- GNIS feature ID: 1626126
- Website: www.comstockmi.gov

Comstock Charter Township is a charter township of Kalamazoo County in the U.S. state of Michigan, located east of the city of Kalamazoo and is part of the Kalamazoo–Portage Metropolitan Area. The 2020 census recorded the population within the township at 15,231.

== Communities ==
- Comstock is an unincorporated community in the western portion of the township along the Kalamazoo River and M-96 at 42°17′12″N 85°30′48″W for which the township is named. The first sawmill in Kalamazoo County opened here along Comstock Creek in 1831, and a gristmill was built soon after in 1832. A post office was established here in February 1832. Comstock School opened in 1833. The Comstock ZIP code 49041 offers only P.O. box service.
- Comstock Northwest is a census-designated place in the northwest section of the township and borders the city of Kalamazoo.
- East Comstock is a named place located just east of the community of Comstock on M-96, near the dam forming Morrow Lake on the Kalamazoo River at 42°17′10″N 85°29′23″W.
- Galesburg is a city on M-96 that borders the eastern portion of the township. The Galesburg ZIP code 49053 serves much of the eastern portion of the township.
- Lawndale is a named place between East Comstock and Galesburg along M-96 at 42°17′11″N 85°27′44″W.

== Schools ==
Comstock Township residents are served by three public school systems:

- Comstock Public Schools, Comstock (Kalamazoo), Michigan
- Galesburg-Augusta Community Schools; Galesburg, Michigan
- Gull Lake Community Schools; Richland, Michigan

== History ==
Township 2 South Range 10 West was first surveyed in January 1827 by Robert M. Clark. The first settler, William Tolland, came there in 1829 but apparently never purchased any land, despite living there for several years. In 1830, land entries were recorded for William Harris for the southwest quarter of section 17 and Major G. Van Dwyer for the southwest quarter of section 13 (the eastern portion of the section is now part of Galesburg). In 1831 land entries were recorded for Horace H. Comstock, Caleb Eldred, Thomas W. Merrill, Mumford Eldred, Stephen Eldred, Leland Lane, and others. Settling in the eastern part of the township in or near what is now Galesburg were Nathaniel Matthews, Ralph Tuttle, Sherman Cummings, George Townsend, and Nathan Cothren. H. H. Comstock, Caleb Eldred, and Cryus Lovell settled in the western part of the township near what became Comstock.

Comstock Township was organized by an act of the Territorial Legislature in 1834. Previously, it was a part of Arcadia Township (later renamed Kalamazoo Township), which initially comprised all eight townships in the northern half of Kalamazoo County. In June 1832, Richland Township was set off, consisting of Richland, Ross, Charleston, and Comstock townships. On March 7, 1834, Comstock township was set off, comprising Comstock and Charleston townships and also Climax Township, which had been set off from Brady Township. Climax was set off from Comstock on December 30, 1837, and Charleston in 1838.

Comstock Township became a charter township in 1964.

== Geography ==
According to the United States Census Bureau, the township has a total area of 35.3 square miles (91.3 km^{2}), of which 33.3 square miles (86.3 km^{2}) are land and 1.9 square miles (5.0 km^{2}), or 5.49%, are water. The Kalamazoo River flows from east to west through the center of the township, including through Morrow Lake, a reservoir.

== Demographics ==
A densely populated portion of the township adjacent to the city of Kalamazoo is part of the census-designated place (CDP), Comstock Northwest.

As of the census of 2000, there were 13,851 people, 5,366 households, and 3,809 families residing in the township. The population density was 420.2 inhabitants per square mile (162.2/km^{2}). There were 5,601 housing units at an average density of 169.9 per square mile (65.6/km^{2}). The racial makeup of the township was 91.98% White, 4.01% African American, 0.43% Native American, 1.16% Asian, 0.01% Pacific Islander, 0.70% from other races, and 1.71% from two or more races. Hispanic or Latino of any race were 1.67% of the population.

There were 5,366 households, out of which 34.2% had children under the age of 18 living with them, 57.0% were married couples living together, 10.1% had a female householder with no husband present, and 29.0% were non-families. 23.5% of all households were made up of individuals, and 7.5% had someone living alone who was 65 years of age or older. The average household size was 2.57 and the average family size was 3.04.

In the township the population was spread out, with 26.8% under the age of 18, 7.7% from 18 to 24, 30.2% from 25 to 44, 23.6% from 45 to 64, and 11.8% who were 65 years of age or older. The median age was 37 years. For every 100 females, there were 96.4 males. For every 100 females age 18 and over, there were 93.8 males.

The median income for a household in the township was $46,140, and the median income for a family was $54,866. Males had a median income of $40,845 versus $29,195 for females. The per capita income for the township was $22,857. About 6.0% of families and 7.1% of the population were below the poverty line, including 10.6% of those under age 18 and 4.6% of those age 65 or over.

== Government ==
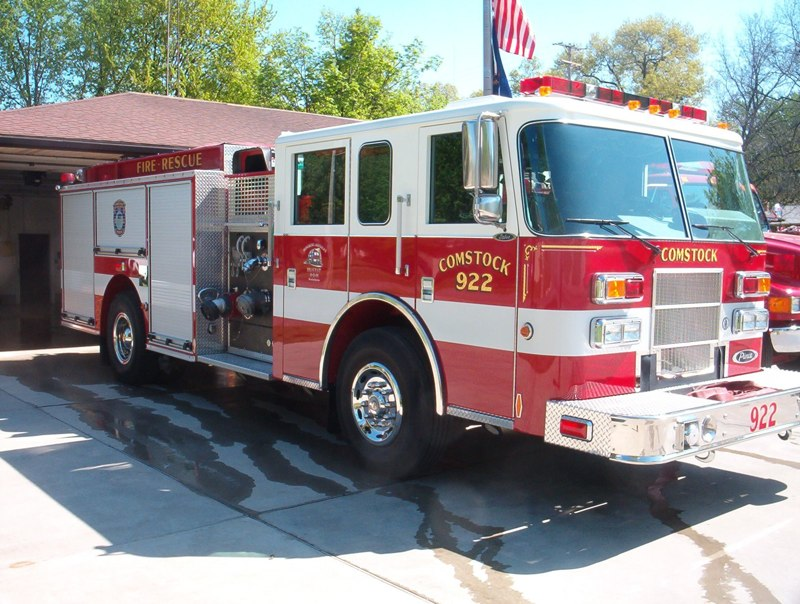
Comstock Fire and Rescue

Comstock Township operates under a home rule charter government, with a supervisor, clerk, treasurer, and four trustees forming the township board of governance.

=== Public utilities ===
The city of Kalamazoo and the city of Galesburg provide water and sanitary sewer service to the urban areas within the township.

=== Public safety ===
The Comstock Fire and Rescue department was established in 1924. It currently operates three fire stations that house six engines. The department employs a full-time fire chief and fire inspector, as well as several full-time and paid on-call staff that operate the three fire stations 24 hours a day.

The township contracts with the Kalamazoo County Sheriff's department to provide police patrol during designated hours within the township.

== Transportation ==
Comstock Township is served by the following highways:

- Interstate 94 (exits 80, 81, and 85).
- State highways M-96 and M-343.

The Kalamazoo Metro Transit public transportation system provides bus service within Comstock Township to the Kalamazoo Transportation Center in downtown Kalamazoo.

The Norfolk Southern and the Grand Trunk Western \ Canadian National railroads provide freight rail service within the township. Amtrak provides passenger rail service 4 miles west in nearby downtown Kalamazoo. Interurban electric rail service that ran from Kalamazoo to Battle Creek through the township ended in 1929.

The Kalamazoo-Battle Creek International Airport is 5 miles southwest in nearby Kalamazoo and provides daily commercial passenger and freight service.

== Economy ==
=== "Bedding Plant Capital of the World" ===
The fertile soil along the Kalamazoo River valley led the Comstock area to become known as the "Bedding Plant Capital of the World". Comstock Township is home to the largest bedding plant cooperative in the United States. Hundreds of thousands of plants, many varieties of which can be found throughout the county's parks and boulevards, are sold each year to retail garden centers nationwide.

=== Bell's Brewery ===
Comstock Township is the home of the Bell's Brewery production facility. Established as the Kalamazoo Brewing Company in 1985 by Larry Bell, the brewery moved production from its original downtown Kalamazoo location to a 60,000-square-foot (5,600 m^{2}) facility in Comstock Township in 2003. The brewery expanded its Comstock facility to nearly 100,000 square feet (9,300 m^{2}) in 2012. The brewery is the largest brew house in the state of Michigan, with an annual capacity of over 1 million barrels.

=== Midlink Business Park ===
Midlink Business Park is a multi-use commercial center that was once the home of a General Motors Fisher Body plant located in Comstock Township. Following the closure of the GM plant in 1998, the site was purchased by a mix of public and private partners to transform the 2.2 million-square-foot facility into a business park. As of 2010, there were 13 businesses operating within the 340-acre site, including a 95-room hotel.
