= Cooper Township, Michigan =

- Charter township
- Cooper Charter Township
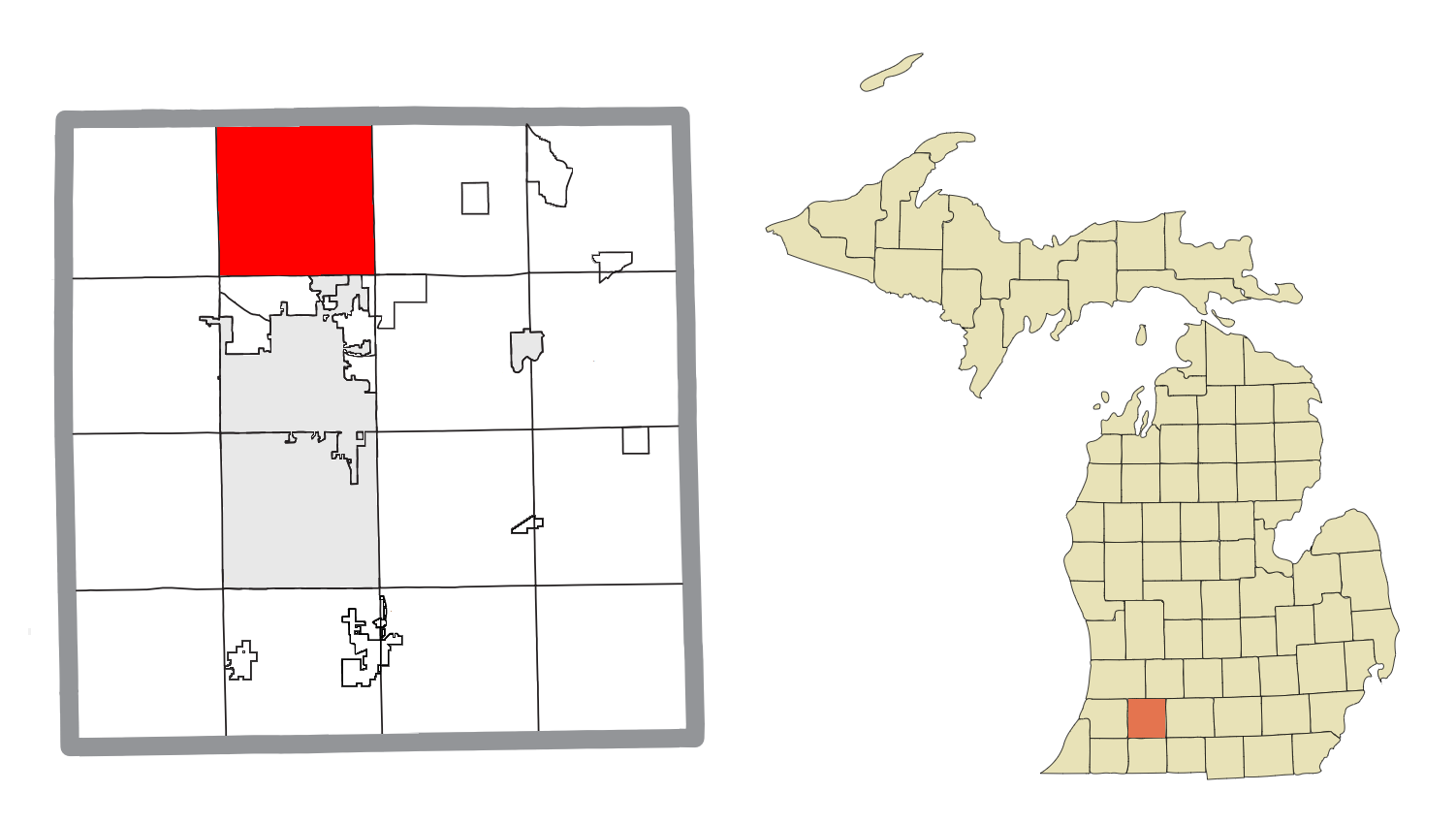
- Location within Kalamazoo County

- Location within the state of Michigan Location within the United States
- Coordinates: 42°22′N 85°35′W
- Country: United States
- State: Michigan
- County: Kalamazoo

Area
  - Total: 36.6 sq mi (94.9 km^{2})
  - Land: 36.3 sq mi (94.1 km^{2})
  - Water: 0.31 sq mi (0.8 km^{2})
- Elevation: 850 ft (259 m)

Population (2020)
  - Total: 10,418
  - Density: 287/sq mi (111/km^{2})
- Time zone: UTC-5 (Eastern (EST))
  - Summer (DST): UTC-4 (EDT)
- FIPS code: 26-077-17980
- GNIS feature ID: 1626131
- Website: www.coopertwp.org

Cooper Charter Township is a charter township of Kalamazoo County in the U.S. state of Michigan. The population was 10,418 at the 2020 census, up from 10,111 at the 2010 census. The township was organized in 1837.

== History ==
The township is named after Sarah Sabina Cooper, the wife of Horace H. Comstock, an early pioneer of the area and founder of nearby Comstock. She was the niece of the author James Fenimore Cooper.

== Geography ==
According to the United States Census Bureau, the township has a total area of 36.6 square miles (94.9 km^{2}), of which 36.3 square miles (94.1 km^{2}) are land and 0.3 square miles (0.8 km^{2}), or 0.84%, are water. A community called Cooper Center exists in the physical center of the township.

== Demographics ==
As of the census of 2000, there were 8,754 people, 3,187 households, and 2,489 families residing in the township. The population density was 241.2 inhabitants per square mile (93.1/km^{2}). There were 3,269 housing units at an average density of 90.1 per square mile (34.8/km^{2}). The racial makeup of the township was 96.16% White, 1.36% African American, 0.30% Native American, 0.45% Asian, 0.01% Pacific Islander, 0.39% from other races, and 1.34% from two or more races. Hispanic or Latino of any race were 1.20% of the population.

There were 3,187 households, out of which 35.3% had children under the age of 18 living with them, 66.9% were married couples living together, 8.2% had a female householder with no husband present, and 21.9% were non-families. 17.9% of all households were made up of individuals, and 7.2% had someone living alone who was 65 years of age or older. The average household size was 2.71 and the average family size was 3.07.

In the township the population was spread out, with 26.8% under the age of 18, 6.4% from 18 to 24, 27.5% from 25 to 44, 27.0% from 45 to 64, and 12.4% who were 65 years of age or older. The median age was 39 years. For every 100 females, there were 96.3 males. For every 100 females age 18 and over, there were 94.1 males.

The median income for a household in the township was $47,004, and the median income for a family was $52,737. Males had a median income of $40,500 versus $27,817 for females. The per capita income for the township was $21,566. About 3.0% of families and 3.5% of the population were below the poverty line, including 4.4% of those under age 18 and 4.1% of those age 65 or over.
