= Kalamazoo Foundation for Excellence =

The Kalamazoo Foundation for Excellence is the working title of an initiative proposed by the community of Kalamazoo to philanthropically raise money for essential government services instead of imposing an income tax.

== History ==
The Kalamazoo City Manager Jim Ritsema, Mayor Bobby Hopewell, and City Attorney Clyde J Robinson met with William Johnston and William Parfet who agreed on a 70.3 million dollar donation over a three-year period. The goal of the foundation is to increase city funding while decreasing property taxes. Kalamazoo felt it was necessary to explore the idea of the foundation after the State of Michigan imposed restrictions on how cities can raise revenue and state revenue sharing declined.

The Foundation was approved by the commission and mayor by a 5–2 vote on Aug. 25, 2017.

== Disagreement on acceptance ==
City Commissioner Matt Milcarek believes the city should work to impose an income tax instead of continuing work on the foundation, something voters in Kalamazoo have rejected twice.
