= Kalamazoo Promise =

Scholarship for students from Kalamazoo, Michigan

The Kalamazoo Promise is a pledge by a group of anonymous donors to pay up to 100 percent of tuition at many Michigan colleges and universities for graduates of the Kalamazoo Public Schools school district of Kalamazoo, Michigan. The Kalamazoo Promise applies to all of Michigan's state colleges and universities, as well as the 15 private colleges of the Michigan College Alliance and several apprenticeships and skilled trade programs. To receive the minimum 65% benefit, students must have lived within the Kalamazoo School District, attended public high school there for four years, and graduated. To receive a full scholarship, students must have attended Kalamazoo public schools since kindergarten.

The program, unveiled at a November 10, 2005, Kalamazoo Board of Education meeting, is also viewed as an economic development tool for Kalamazoo. Since the Kalamazoo Promise was announced, enrollment in the school district has grown by 16%, test scores have improved, and a greater proportion of high-school graduates are attending college. In 2010 alone, the Kalamazoo Public School district saw enrollment rise 3% to 12,409. In 2016, Time (magazine) included the Kalamazoo Promise at position 145 in its list of 240 Reasons to Celebrate America.

Research published by the Upjohn Institute in 2015 shows that the Kalamazoo Promise significantly increases college enrollment, college credits attempted, and credential attainment, and the researchers conclude that such scholarships can both increase educational attainment and provide net economic benefits.

Tuition checks began to be distributed in 2006. As of summer 2010, the program had paid out $18 million in tuition for about 2,000 high school graduates of Kalamazoo's two high schools and three alternative schools, according to executive administrator Robert Jorth. Most of the money has gone to the University of Michigan, Michigan State University and Western Michigan University. Promise-funded students have enrolled in all but one of Michigan's 15 state universities. As of October 2010, 60% of Promise-funded students had obtained bachelor's degrees.

Length of attendance	Proportion of full tuition
K–12	100%
1–12	95%
2–12	95%
3–12	95%
4–12	90%
5–12	85%
6–12	80%
7–12	75%
8–12	70%
9–12	65%
10–12	None
11–12	None
12	None

== Similar programs ==
El Dorado, Arkansas; Denver, Colorado; Battle Creek, Michigan;, Detroit, Michigan; New Haven, Connecticut; and Pittsburgh, Pennsylvania are just a handful of the nearly two dozen communities that have similar "Promise" programs. These communities have joined PromiseNet, a network of communities that run or plan similar place-based scholarship programs. The PromiseNet 2013 Conference was meant to foster such programs.

The City of Kalamazoo is also attempting a similar program, the Kalamazoo Foundation for Excellence which is believed to have many of the same donors of the Kalamazoo promise.

== Success rate of students ==
As of 2011 half of the students who have started programs have dropped out before finishing degrees or certificates. In response to this executive director of The Promise Janice M. Brown Ed.D. has said, "stage II of The Promise is improving the preparation and support for low-income and first-generation college students who are more likely to start at community college and more likely to drop out because they are academically unprepared and/or because they lack the support system that middle-class and affluent college students take for granted". Yet as Ted C. Fishman notes in a New York Times Magazine piece, the Kalamazoo Promise "stokes hometown pride, prods citizens to engage and pulls businesses and their leaders into the public sphere." He also points out that "High-school test scores in Kalamazoo have improved four years in a row. A higher percentage of African-American girls graduate from the district than they do in the rest of the state, and 85 percent of those go on to college. Overall, more than 90 percent of Kalamazoo’s graduates today go on to higher education. Six in 10 go to Western Michigan University or Kalamazoo Valley Community College. And over time, a greater number of students are landing at the more selective University of Michigan and Michigan State." Additional media reports substantiate these statistics.

== Work done by the Kalamazoo promise ==
The Kalamazoo Promise reached its 20th year in 2026. It continues to help graduates find good job opportunities. Kalamazoo Promise collaborated with employers such as Urban Alliance to offer opportunities for creating outstanding resumes, offer internships, and promote skills training. The W.E. Upjohn Institute was also awarded a grant to conduct research on employment data and salaries of graduates which are projected in 2019. The first cohort of Kalamazoo Promise students finished high school in 2006. The Promise has been a factor in increasing the possibility of children enrolling in college and completing college degrees. The Strada Education Network grant worth $360,000 will allow the Institute to research how students can be employed after their graduation, their probable earnings, and residence. Kalamazoo Promise recognized teachers and staff from West Michigan who made a considerable impact on their students in June 2018. Over 6,000 students have already gained benefits from the Promise since it was established.
