= Richland Township, Kalamazoo County, Michigan =

Richland Township, Michigan
- Civil township
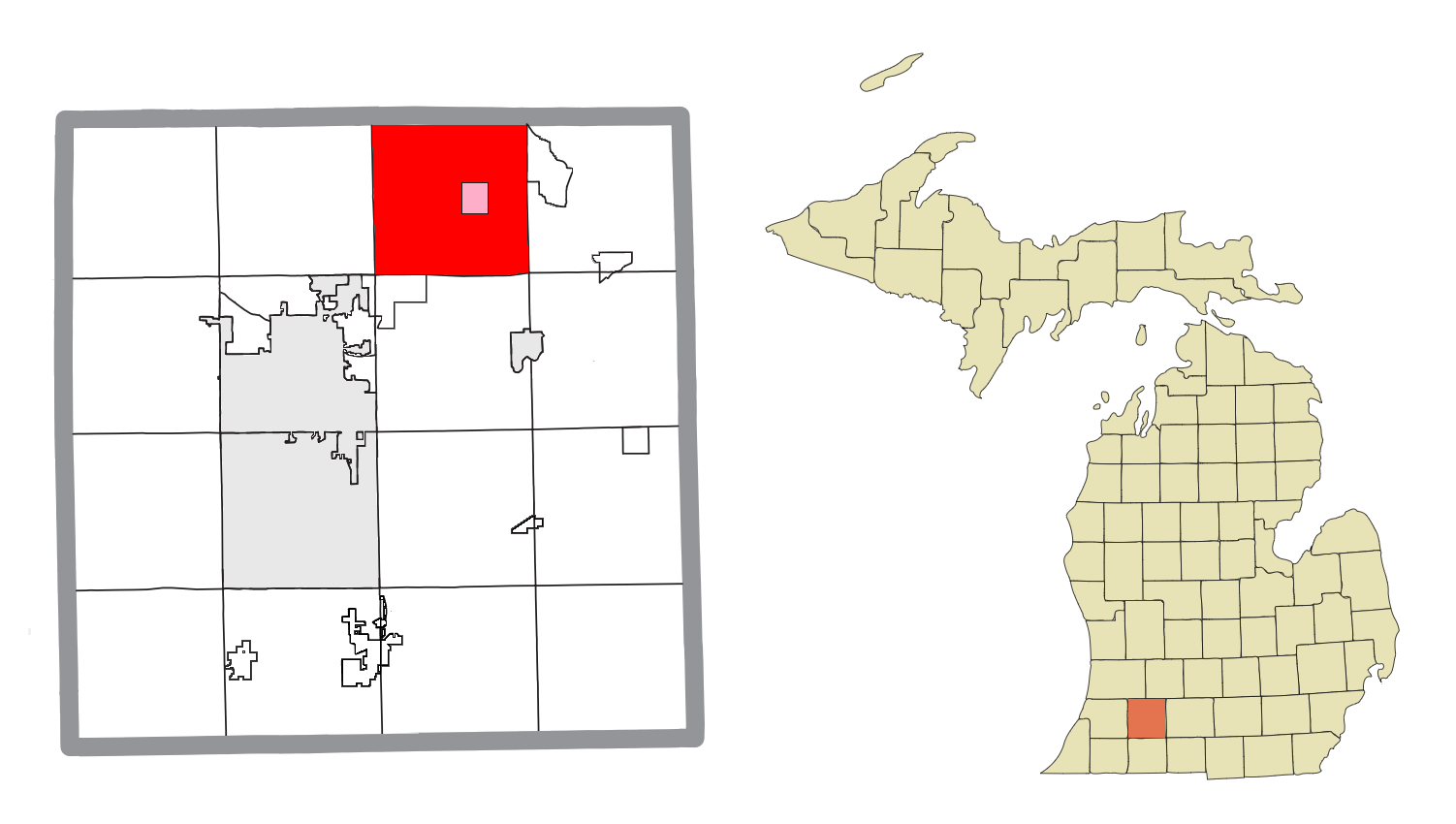
- Location within Kalamazoo County and the administered village of Richland

- Location within the state of Michigan Location within the United States
- Coordinates: 42°22′16″N 85°28′13″W
- Country: United States
- State: Michigan
- County: Kalamazoo

Area
  - Total: 36.2 sq mi (93.7 km^{2})
  - Land: 34.4 sq mi (89.2 km^{2})
  - Water: 1.7 sq mi (4.5 km^{2})
- Elevation: 889 ft (271 m)

Population (2020)
  - Total: 8,693
  - Density: 252/sq mi (97.5/km^{2})
- Time zone: UTC-5 (Eastern (EST))
  - Summer (DST): UTC-4 (EDT)
- ZIP code: 49083
- Area code: 269
- FIPS code: 26-077-68260
- GNIS feature ID: 1626970
- Website: www.richlandtwp.net

Richland Township is a civil township of Kalamazoo County in the U.S. state of Michigan. The population was 8,693 at the 2020 census, up from 7,580 at the 2010 census.

The village of Richland is located within the township. Richland Township was organized in 1832.

== Geography ==
The township is in northern Kalamazoo County and is bordered to the north by Barry County. It is 8 miles (13 km) northeast of Kalamazoo, the county seat. According to the United States Census Bureau, the township has a total area of 36.2 square miles (93.7 km^{2}), of which 34.4 square miles (89.2 km^{2}) are land and 1.7 square miles (4.5 km^{2}), or 4.84%, are water. South Gull Lake is a large water body that is partly in the northeast corner of the township.

== Demographics ==
As of the census of 2000, there were 6,491 people, 2,394 households, and 1,898 families residing in the township. The population density was 186.8 inhabitants per square mile (72.1/km^{2}). There were 2,635 housing units at an average density of 75.8 per square mile (29.3/km^{2}). The racial makeup of the township was 93.42% White, 3.34% African American, 0.37% Native American, 0.94% Asian, 0.06% Pacific Islander, 0.45% from other races, and 1.42% from two or more races. Hispanic or Latino of any race were 1.54% of the population.

There were 2,394 households, out of which 38.6% had children under the age of 18 living with them, 67.0% were married couples living together, 8.8% had a female householder with no husband present, and 20.7% were non-families. 16.8% of all households were made up of individuals, and 5.7% had someone living alone who was 65 years of age or older. The average household size was 2.71 and the average family size was 3.04.

In the township the population was spread out, with 29.0% under the age of 18, 6.6% from 18 to 24, 27.2% from 25 to 44, 27.2% from 45 to 64, and 9.9% who were 65 years of age or older. The median age was 38 years. For every 100 females, there were 95.9 males. For every 100 females age 18 and over, there were 93.6 males.

The median income for a household in the township was $59,432, and the median income for a family was $62,838. Males had a median income of $45,989 versus $31,173 for females. The per capita income for the township was $29,613. About 3.5% of families and 4.8% of the population were below the poverty line, including 6.0% of those under age 18 and 7.4% of those age 65 or over.
