= Charleston Township, Kalamazoo County, Michigan =

Charleston Township, Michigan
- Civil township
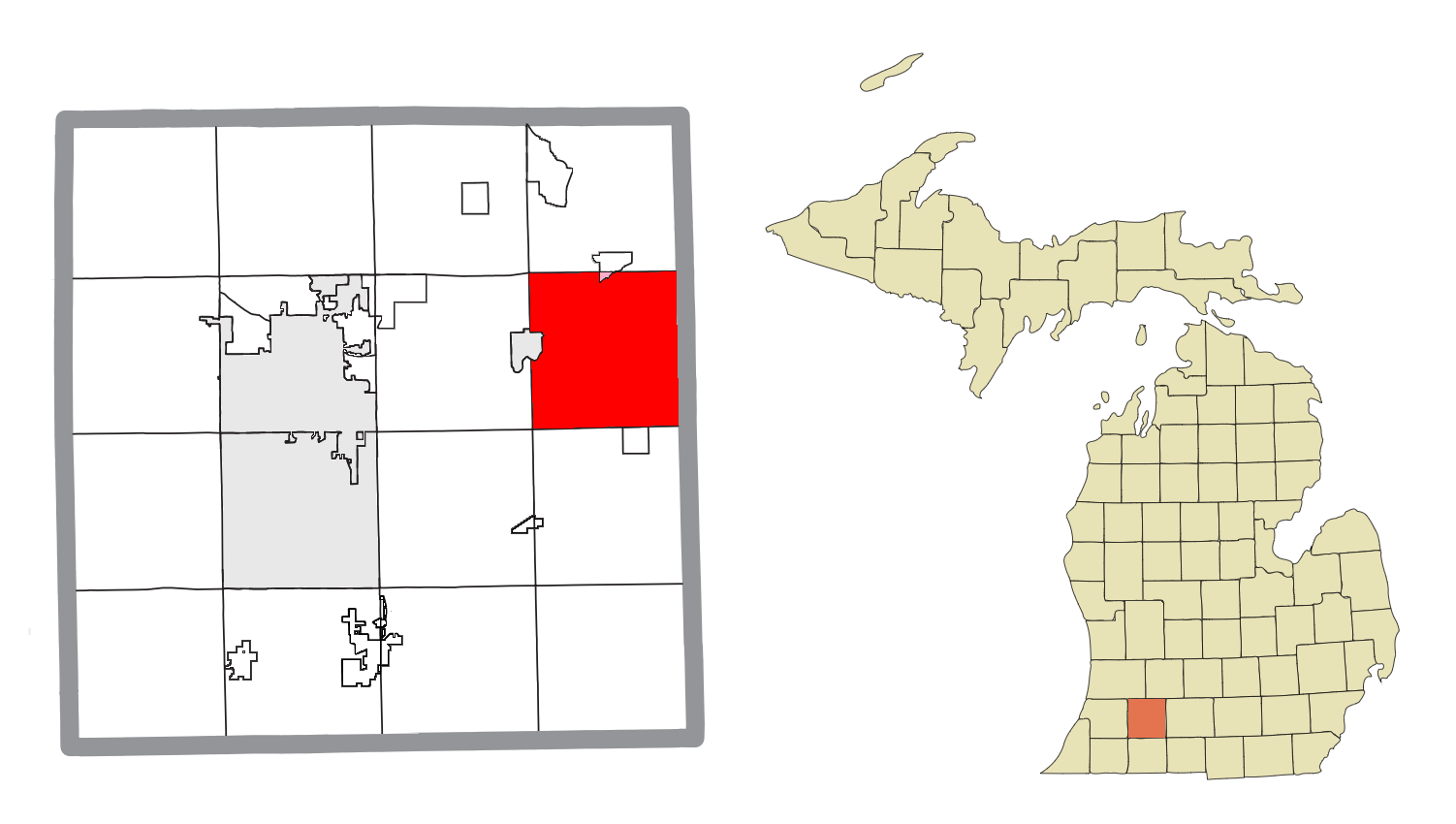
- Location within Kalamazoo County and an administered portion of the village of Augusta

- Location within the state of Michigan Location within the United States
- Coordinates: 42°16′54″N 85°21′30″W
- Country: United States
- State: Michigan
- County: Kalamazoo

Area
  - Total: 35.6 sq mi (92.1 km^{2})
  - Land: 34.8 sq mi (90.1 km^{2})
  - Water: 0.77 sq mi (2.0 km^{2})
- Elevation: 945 ft (288 m)

Population (2020)
  - Total: 1,904
  - Density: 54.7/sq mi (21.1/km^{2})
- Time zone: UTC-5 (Eastern (EST))
  - Summer (DST): UTC-4 (EDT)
- FIPS code: 26-077-14720
- GNIS feature ID: 1626059
- Website: www.charlestontownship.org

Charleston Township is a civil township of Kalamazoo County in the U.S. state of Michigan. The 2020 census recorded a population of 1,904, slightly down from 1,975 at the 2010 census.

== Geography ==
The township is on the eastern side of Kalamazoo County, bordered to the east by the city of Battle Creek in Calhoun County and to the west by the smaller city of Galesburg. The village of Climax lies along the township's southern border, and the village of Augusta is partially in the northern part of the township. Interstate 94 runs through the center of the township, connecting Battle Creek to the east with Kalamazoo to the west, and serving the township with one exit.

According to the United States Census Bureau, the township has a total area of 35.6 square miles (92.1 km^{2}), of which 34.8 square miles (90.1 km^{2}) are land and 0.77 square miles (2.0 km^{2}), or 2.20%, are water. The Kalamazoo River flows through the northwest part of the township between Augusta and Galesburg.

== History ==
A section of the township was settled in 1833 by Robert Burdick and three of his married sons who had migrated from Otsego County, New York. It was known as "Burdick Settlement".

== Demographics ==
As of the census of 2000, there were 1,813 people, 679 households, and 533 families residing in the township. The population density was 52.0 inhabitants per square mile (20.1/km^{2}). There were 708 housing units at an average density of 20.3 per square mile (7.8/km^{2}). The racial makeup of the township was 96.47% White, 0.55% African American, 0.55% Native American, 0.77% Asian, 0.55% from other races, and 1.10% from two or more races. Hispanic or Latino of any race were 1.38% of the population.

There were 679 households, out of which 32.8% had children under the age of 18 living with them, 68.5% were married couples living together, 7.2% had a female householder with no husband present, and 21.4% were non-families. 17.4% of all households were made up of individuals, and 7.7% had someone living alone who was 65 years of age or older. The average household size was 2.66 and the average family size was 2.98.

In the township the population was spread out, with 25.0% under the age of 18, 5.9% from 18 to 24, 28.0% from 25 to 44, 28.3% from 45 to 64, and 12.8% who were 65 years of age or older. The median age was 40 years. For every 100 females, there were 97.7 males. For every 100 females age 18 and over, there were 95.5 males.

The median income for a household in the township was $50,707, and the median income for a family was $54,188. Males had a median income of $39,271 versus $29,079 for females. The per capita income for the township was $20,921. About 5.3% of families and 7.0% of the population were below the poverty line, including 9.0% of those under age 18 and 4.6% of those age 65 or over.
