= Barry-Roubaix =

Road/off-road cycling race

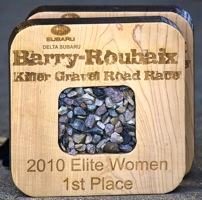
- Barry-Roubaix trophy

Race details
- Date: Late March/Early April, annually
- Region: Michigan, USA
- Nickname: Killer Gravel Road Race
- Discipline: Cyclo-cross, Gravel grinder, Gravel road race

History
- First edition: 2009
- Editions: 15 (as of 2024)
- First winner: Michael Simonson & Mackenzie Woodring
- Most recent: Mat Stephens & Kae Takeshita

Barry-Roubaix is a classic-style road/off-road cycling race featuring a variety of terrain and surfaces to test cyclists of all skill levels. Named to the Global Cycling Network's Top Five Gravel Events and Nine Coolest Races of 2018, the event is known as the World's Largest Gravel Road Race.

The course is located in Barry County, Michigan near the Gun Lake Unit of Yankee Springs Recreation Area. Most years, Barry-Roubaix consists of rolling gravel roads (80%), pavement, one mile of rough two-track, rocks, sand, mud, and possibly snow and ice, along with 2200 feet of climbing. The race features three distinct levels of competition corresponding to different race course distances. The Beginner/Intermediate riders complete a 22-mile course, the Expert riders complete a 36-mile course, and the Elite/Pro riders complete a 62-mile course. The name "Barry-Roubaix" was selected in a naming competition; it is a reference to the famous spring classic Paris–Roubaix one day professional cycling race held in France. Barry-Roubaix is held annually on the third Saturday in April unless Easter happens to fall on that weekend. Participants use a variety of bicycle types (cyclocross, mountain, road, fat), depending on course conditions and individual preferences.

== Results ==
Summary Results Table

Year	Finishers	Male Winner (Psycho Killer)	Female Winner (Psycho Killer)	Male Winner (Killer)	Female Winner (Killer)	Male Winner (Chiller)	Female Winner (Chiller)	Male Winner (Thriller)	Female Winner (Thriller)
2021		Connor Kamm	Danielle Larson	Hugo Scala	Lindsey Stevenson	Ted Schneider	Loisann Fulton	Hunter Post	Gwen Urbain
2020	CNX'd COVID								
2019		Michael Simonson	Cristine Thornburgh	Mat Stephens	Kae Takeshita	Jamison Sheppard	Summer Gilbert	Nate Van Belois	Kathy Braginton
2018		Michael Simonson	Nan Doyal	Mat Stephens	Rachel Langdon	Tyler Weston	Christina Draijer	Hayden Fox	Robin Wooldridge
2017	1864	—N/a	—N/a	Mat Stephens	Lily Williams	Joseph Martin	Marie Voss	Andrew Sics	Angie O'Brien
2016	2677	—N/a	—N/a	Rudyard Peterson	Rachel Langdon	Bryce Nuiver	Marie Dersham	Alex Morton	Robin Wooldridge
2015	2421	—N/a	—N/a	David Lombardo	Mackenzie Woodring	Cameron Buccelato	Lindsey Kriete	Jesse Lopez Ray	Maureen O'Hare
2014	2174	—N/a	—N/a	Steven Broglio	Stephanie Swan	Simon Bailey	Emma Swartz	Brad Zapalowski	Peggy Hasse
2013	2144	—N/a	—N/a	Justin Lindine	Mackenzie Woodring	Rudyard Peterson	Cindi Bannick	Eddie Stein	Emma Swartz
2012	1338	—N/a	—N/a	Mike Anderson	Amy Stauffer	Jordan Diekema	Marie Dersham	Greg Brown	Katie Tomczyk
2011	896	—N/a	—N/a	Erik Box	Samantha Brode	Don Cameron	Kathy Everts	Trevor Smela	Sherry Martin
2010	656	—N/a	—N/a	Derek Graham	Mackenzie Woodring	Taylor Birmann	Julie Daher	Larry Peters	Diane Kaeser
2009	248	—N/a	—N/a	Michael Simonson	Mackenzie Woodring	Chris Kreple	Laura Johnson	David Vannette	Andrea Davis

== History ==
=== 2009 ===
Started in 2009, Barry-Roubaix's inaugural event staging took place at the historic Long Lake Outdoor Center, in Middleville, Michigan, a Barry County, Michigan community. On March 28, the 274 racers were treated to perfect conditions; cool and sunny weather prevailed.

=== 2010 ===
For 2010, the race start/finish location moved to the Gun Lake beach area at Yankee Springs Recreation Area to accommodate the anticipated growth in attendance. On race day (March 27), the Sheriff escorted the 673 racers through a controlled, neutral roll out of 2.5 miles. Racers faced sunny but cold conditions; the temperature at the time of the race start was only 34 °F (1 °C) degrees, while a biting 15 miles per hour (24 km/h) wind blew out of the southeast.

=== 2011 ===
The 2011 edition was held on March 26, in very cold conditions. Over 1000 participants started the race, but only 896 finished; 114 racers completed the 65 mile course (male winner: Erik Box, female winner: Samantha Brode); 564 racers completed the 35 mile course (male winner: Don Cameron; female winner: Kathy Everts); and 218 racers completed the 23 mile course (male winner: Trevor Smela; female winner: Sherry Martin).

=== 2012 ===
In 2012, Barry-Roubaix: Killer Gravel Road Race served as the second of five events in the American UltraCx Championship Series (stages ranging from 80 to 115 km). In the weeks leading up to the race, kolo t.c. riders previewed the course, sharing elevation profiles and tips for succeeding on challenging course sections including the Eye of the Tiger climb, Sager Road, and the Three Sisters.

=== 2013 ===
Consistent with the increase in popularity of gravel road racing (also known as 'Gravel Grinders') in the United States, the 2013 event was moved again, this time to downtown Hastings, MI. The new start/finish area was well received by the City, local residents and racers. Registration for the fifth annual Barry-Roubaix: Killer Gravel Road Race increased by almost three-fold, to 2873 registered participants. An unexpected snowstorm created unusually harsh conditions, and the race course was altered at the last minute to avoid the treacherous Sager Road two-track section. Despite the course alteration, the race almost lived up its "Killer" name, as a participant collapsed on the course but was later revived by a medical team. The 2013 title sponsor was Founders Brewing.

=== 2014 ===
The 2014 edition was held on March 22; the event has been classified as the world's largest gravel road race with over 3000 participants.

=== 2015 ===
Media coverage leading up to the 7th annual Barry-Roubaix (28 March 2015) focused on a forecast for unseasonably cold temperatures, and anticipation of a large field size and podium payouts. In both the men's and women's 62 mile Open Category races, early breakaways defined the outcome of the day. 2008 Summer Paralympics Gold medalist Mackenzie Woodring (Lowell, MI) took the 2015 Barry-Roubaix Women's Open trophy with a finish time more than five minutes faster than runner-up and 2015 UCI Cyclo-cross World Championships Team United States Elite Women's Team Member, Crystal Anthony (Beverly, MA). This win marked Woodring's fourth Barry-Roubaix victory in seven attempts. In contrast, Men's Open Category 2015 Barry-Roubaix Champion, David Lombardo (Crystal Lake, IL), established and held an early lead for most of the 62 mile race, but finished only 14 seconds ahead of runner-up Nathaniel Beams (Fort Collins, CO).

=== 2016 ===
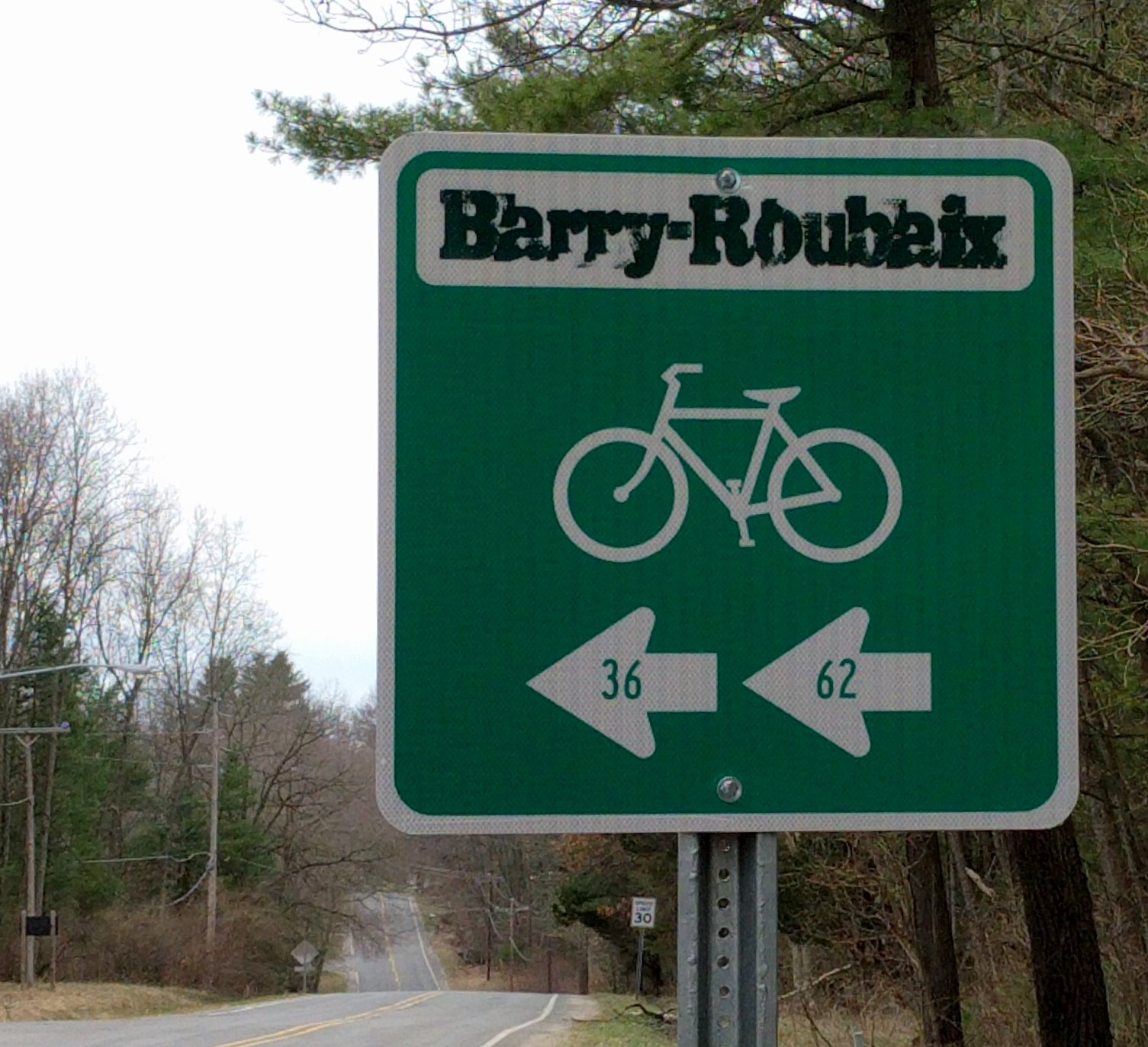
Permanent road signs placed throughout Barry County, Michigan, guide cyclists through all three race courses.

In January 2016, 65 permanent road signs were installed in Barry County to mark the three Barry-Roubaix course routes for race participants and recreational cyclists who visit the area to train on the course year-round. The annual economic impact of the Barry-Roubaix event has grown to over US$500,000.

The 2016 Barry-Roubaix was pushed back until April 16, 2016 to avoid a conflict with Easter. The later starting date presented riders with a new and virtually unheard of challenge for this race, heat. The average temperature for the 62 mile race was 70F which was a full 41 degrees warmer than the average temperature from previous year. Dry and dusty course conditions made for a fast race which took on the character of a road race with large pelotons staying together until the finish. The top four riders all had the same finishing time (2:54:56), with Rudyard Peterson (Team Credit Velo-Trek; Michigan, USA) winning the sprint at the line. The top nine riders came in within one second of one another. On the women's side, it was a different story with Rachel Langdon (Kentucky, USA) finishing almost 7 minutes ahead of Christine Thornburg (Team Psimet Racing, Illinois USA) with a time of 3:08:37.

On 26 Jan 2017, the tourism and economic development impact of Barry-Roubaix was recognized as the event tied for The Destination Award, an annual award given by the Barry County, Michigan Chamber of Commerce and Economic Development.

=== 2017 ===
Held March 25, 2017, the 9th edition of Barry-Roubaix was one of eight events in the Michigan Gravel Race Series, a points series that debuted in 2017. The male winner of the 62 mile 'Killer' race was Mat Stephens, who edged out Mac Brennen and Ansel Dickey in a sprint for the finish line. The female winner of the 62 mile race was Lily Williams. The event was notable due to the freezing rain that had come in shortly after the race began.

=== 2018 ===
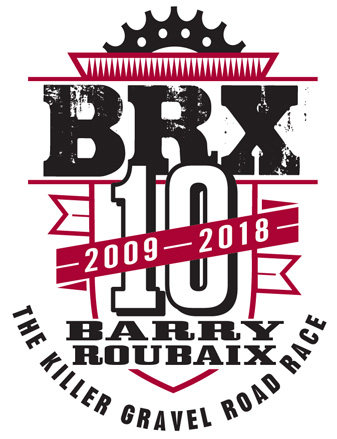
Founders Barry-Roubaix Killer Gravel Road Race: 10 year anniversary emblem

The tenth anniversary edition of the Founders Barry-Roubaix Killer Gravel Road Race was held 21 April 2018. To commemorate this anniversary, race organizers added a longer, more challenging 100 miles (160 km) race, such that four cycling races occurred simultaneously:

- The Panaracer Psycho-Killer (100 miles (160 km))
- The SRAM Corporation Killer (62 miles (100 km))
- The Smith Optics Thriller (36 miles (58 km))
- The Lauf Chiller (22 miles (35 km))

The Men's 62 mile Killer race winner was 2017 winner Mat Stephens (Team Panaracer/Stan’s NoTubes), finishing 11 minutes faster than the previous year. The time is a new course record. Daniel Yankus (Team Athletic Mentors/Fabri-Kal Greenware) placed second, and Timothy Rugg (Team The High Roost p/b Lauf) finished third. The 2018 Women's 62 mile Killer race was decided in a sprint finish, with the top three finishers' times separated by three seconds. Race winner Rachel Langdon (Team Gray Goat Mobile) also won in 2016. Finishing in 2:59:57, Langdon set a new course record, bettering Mackenzie Woodring's 2013 record by seven minutes. Mary Penta (Team Women's Racing Project) and Kae Takeshita (Team Panaracer/Stan's NoTubes) finished second and third. Jeff Jacobi, a Grand Rapids, Michigan cyclist, completed the 36 mile Thriller gravel race on a Penny-farthing vintage high wheeler bike, raising over $10,000 (USD) for the charity Gilda's Club.
