= Thornapple Kellogg School District =

School district in Michigan

Thornapple Kellogg Schools

Address
- 10051 Green Lake Road Middleville, Barry, Michigan, 49333; United States

District information
- Grades: Pre-Kindergarten-12
- Superintendent: Craig McCarthy
- Schools: 6
- Budget: $57,971,000 2022-2023 expenditures
- NCES District ID: 2633810

Students and staff
- Students: 3,148 (2023-2024)
- Teachers: 179.59 (on an FTE basis) (2023-2024)
- Staff: 405.86 FTE (2023-2024)
- Student–teacher ratio: 17.53 (2023-2024)

Other information
- Website: www.tkschools.org

Thornapple Kellogg Schools is a public school district in West Michigan. In Barry County, it serves Middleville, Freeport, and parts of the townships of Irving, Orangeville, Rutland, Thornapple, and Yankee Springs. In Allegan County, it serves parts of Leighton and Wayland townships. It also serves parts of Bowne Township in Kent County and Campbell Township in Ionia County.

== History ==
Middleville's first brick school, a union school, was built in 1871. Although it included a high school, the first commencement was held in 1881. This school was demolished in 1935.

In 1931, the Will Keith Kellogg Child Welfare Foundation contributed to the cost of a school building in the Thornapple Township school district (which consolidated the rural schoolhouse districts in the area that same year) to build the first Thornapple-Kellogg school. The Foundation allowed the junior/senior high school to have more educational options: "Agriculture, domestic sciences, manual training, cooking, canning and sewing in addition to regular academic subjects," according to a 1930 newspaper article. McFall Elementary was built west of the high school in 1951, and a gym and music room addition was built at the high school in 1957.

The present Thornapple Kellogg High School opened in fall of 1971. At that time, the previous high school became a school for grades 5-8. The old high school was torn down in 1999, and the 1957 gymnasium addition remained and was connected to McFall Elementary.

Middleville's public library is housed within the high school, an arrangement going back to 1923.

== Schools ==
Schools in Thornapple Kellogg School District
School	Address	Notes
Thornapple Kellogg High School	3885 Bender Rd., Middleville	Grades 9-12. Built 1971.
Thornapple Middle School	10375 Green Lake Rd., Middleville	Grades 6-8
Page Elementary	3675 Bender Rd., Middleville	Grades 4-5
Lee Elementary	840 W. Main St., Middleville	Grades 2-3
McFall Elementary	509 W. Main St., Middleville	Grades PreK-1
Early Childhood Center	3316 Bender Rd., Middleville	Preschool. Opened 2022.
