= Yankee Springs =

Yankee Springs may refer to:

- Yankee Springs Recreation Area
- Yankee Springs Township, Michigan
