= Chief Noonday Outdoor Center =

- Chief Noonday Group Camp Historic District
- U.S. National Register of Historic Places
- U.S. Historic district
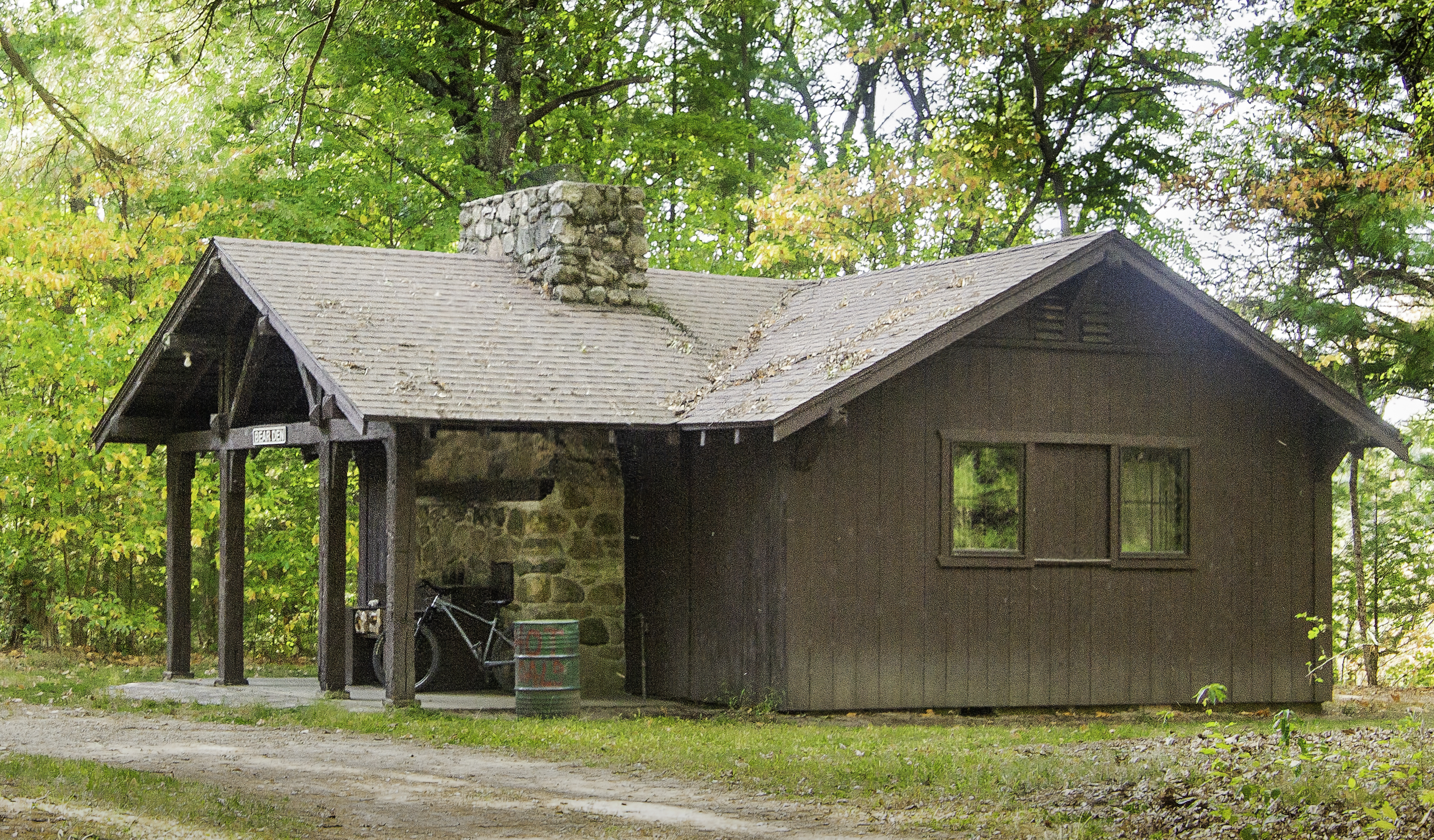
- Chief Noonday Camp in Yankee Springs

- Location within Michigan Location within the United States
- Interactive map
- Location: Chief Noonday Road (County Road 434) east of Briggs Road, Yankee Springs Township
- Coordinates: 42°38′24″N 85°30′7″W
- Area: 130 acres (53 ha)
- Architectural style: NPS rustic
- NRHP reference No.: 96001481
- Added to NRHP: December 13, 1996

The Chief Noonday Outdoor Center, also known as the Chief Noonday Group Camp Historic District, is a recreational facility located on Chief Noonday Road (County Road 434), approximately one mile east of Briggs Road in Yankee Springs Township. It was listed on the National Register of Historic Places in 1996.

== History ==
The land in what is now the Yankee Springs Recreation Area was originally settled in the 1830s, but by the 1930s the land was eroding and farms were failing. The US government purchased a wide tract of land in the area and began reforestation. The National Park Service's Recreation Development Area (RDAs) program was active during the Great Depression, providing jobs and constructing scores of organized camping facilities throughout the nation. Four of these facilities were constructed in Michigan, and two of those were located in the Yankee Springs Recreation Area: the Long Lake Group Camp and this Chief Noonday Group Camp (originally the Mud Lake Camp).

Construction on the Chief Noonday Group Camp began in 1936. National Park Service architect Ernest F. Hartwick designed many of the buildings, while landscape architect Theodore N. Zaetsch laid out the plans for use of the land.

The camp was used continuously for some time, but recently the decision was made to refurbish the cabins one at a time. As of 2013, one refurbished cabin, renamed the "Crane House cabin," was available for rental.

== Description ==
The Chief Noonday Outdoor Center is located in the Yankee Springs Recreation Area. The camp contains four villages arranged around a central fire pit, in addition to a central administration area containing a dining hall and kitchen complex and miscellaneous camp service facilities. The buildings are primarily single-story frame structures with gable roofs, clad with rough-sawn vertical boards. The buildings sit on concrete foundations with fieldstone veneers. Many of the larger buildings have massive fieldstone chimneys.
