= Long Lake Outdoor Center =

- Long Lake Group Camp Historic District
- U.S. National Register of Historic Places
- U.S. Historic district
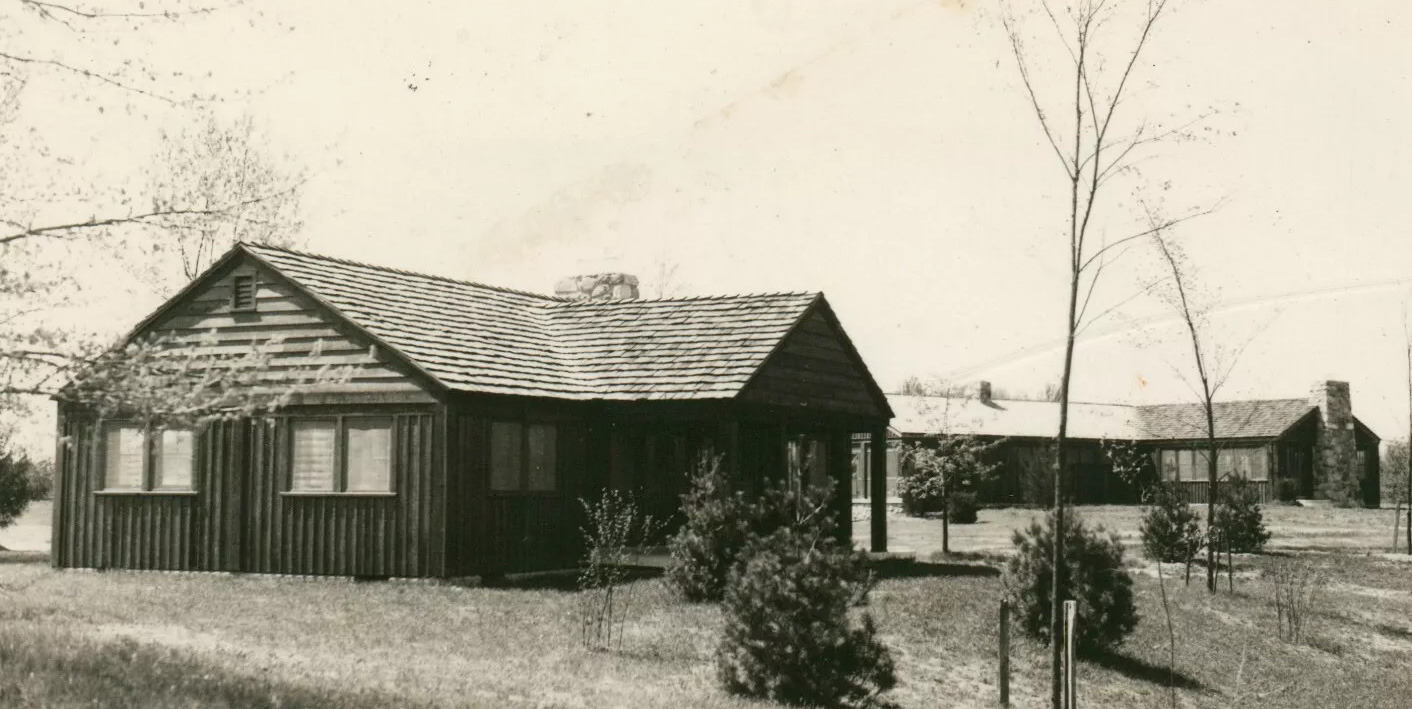
- Long Lake Camp in Yankee Springs, 1940s

- Location within Michigan Location within the United States
- Interactive map
- Location: 10370 Gun Lake Rd., Yankee Springs Township, Barry County, Michigan, United States
- Nearest city: Cloverdale, Michigan
- Coordinates: 42°37′0″N 85°29′41″W
- Area: 115 acres (47 ha)
- Architect: Ernest F. Hartwick, Theodore N. Zaetsch
- Architectural style: NPS rustic
- NRHP reference No.: 96001482
- Added to NRHP: December 13, 1996

The Long Lake Outdoor Center, also known as the Long Lake Group Camp Historic District, is a recreational facility located at 10370 Gun Lake Road in Yankee Springs Township, Barry County, Michigan, United States. It was listed on the National Register of Historic Places in 1996.

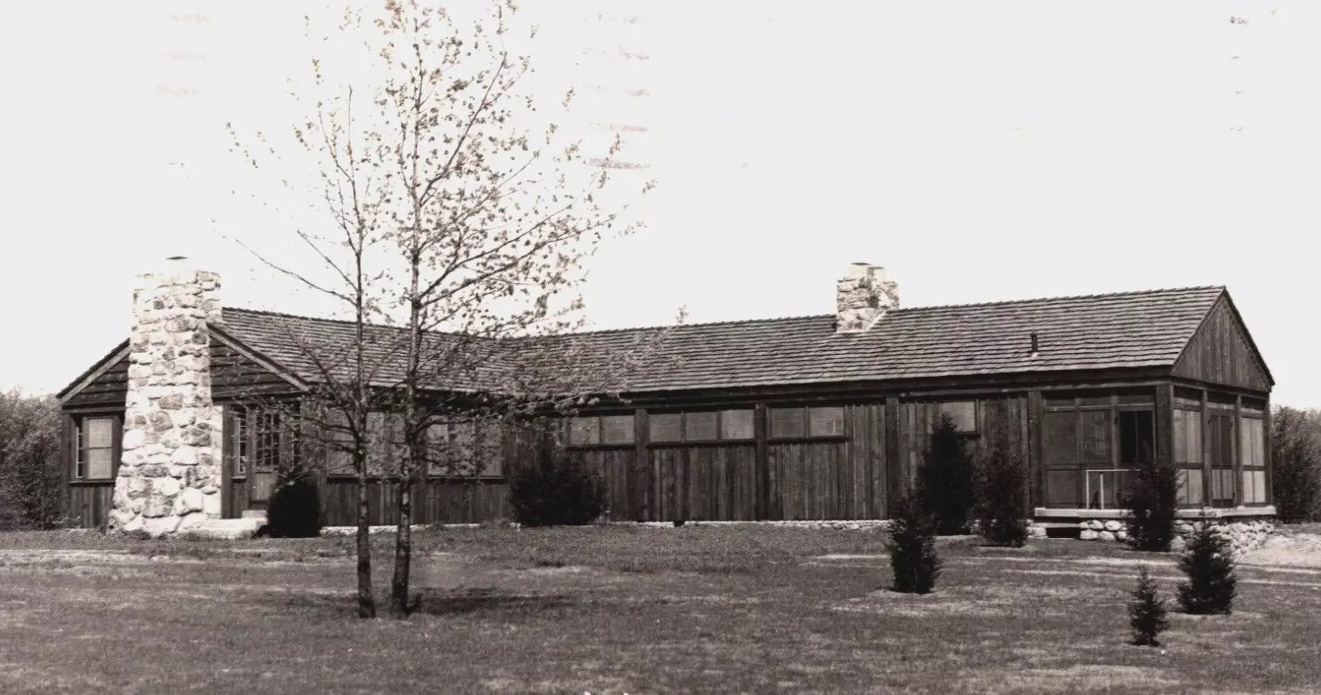
Long Lake Camp in Yankee Springs, 1940s

== History ==
The land in what is now the Yankee Springs Recreation Area was originally settled in the 1830s, but by the 1930s, the land was eroding and farms were failing. The US government purchased a wide tract of land in the area and began reforestation. The National Park Service's Recreation Development Area (RDAs) program was active during the Great Depression, providing jobs and constructing scores of organized camping facilities throughout the nation. Four of these facilities were constructed in Michigan, and two of them were located in the Yankee Springs Recreation Area: the Chief Noonday Group Camp and this Long Lake Group Camp.

The construction on the Long Lake Group Camp began in 1936 and continued until approximately 1939. National Park Service architect Ernest F. Hartwick designed many of the buildings, while landscape architect Theodore N. Zaetsch laid out the plans for use of the land. The Long Lake Group Camp is significant for hosting Camp Michiwana, an important Michigan camp organization, for over 40 years.

In 1943, the federal government turned over Yankee Springs to the State of Michigan. The Long Lake Group Camp has been continuously operated since then. In the early 1980s, the camp was renovated, and two of the four original cabin circles were demolished, with the remaining buildings renovated. The current operators lease the facility from the state of Michigan and operate it as a private business.

== Description ==
The Long Lake Group Camp is located on 300 acres in the Yankee Springs Recreation Area The camp contains two villages, each containing eight cabins arranged around a central fire pit, in addition to a central administration area containing a dining hall and kitchen complex and miscellaneous camp service facilities.
