= Middleville station =

- Michigan Central Railroad Middleville Depot
- U.S. National Register of Historic Places
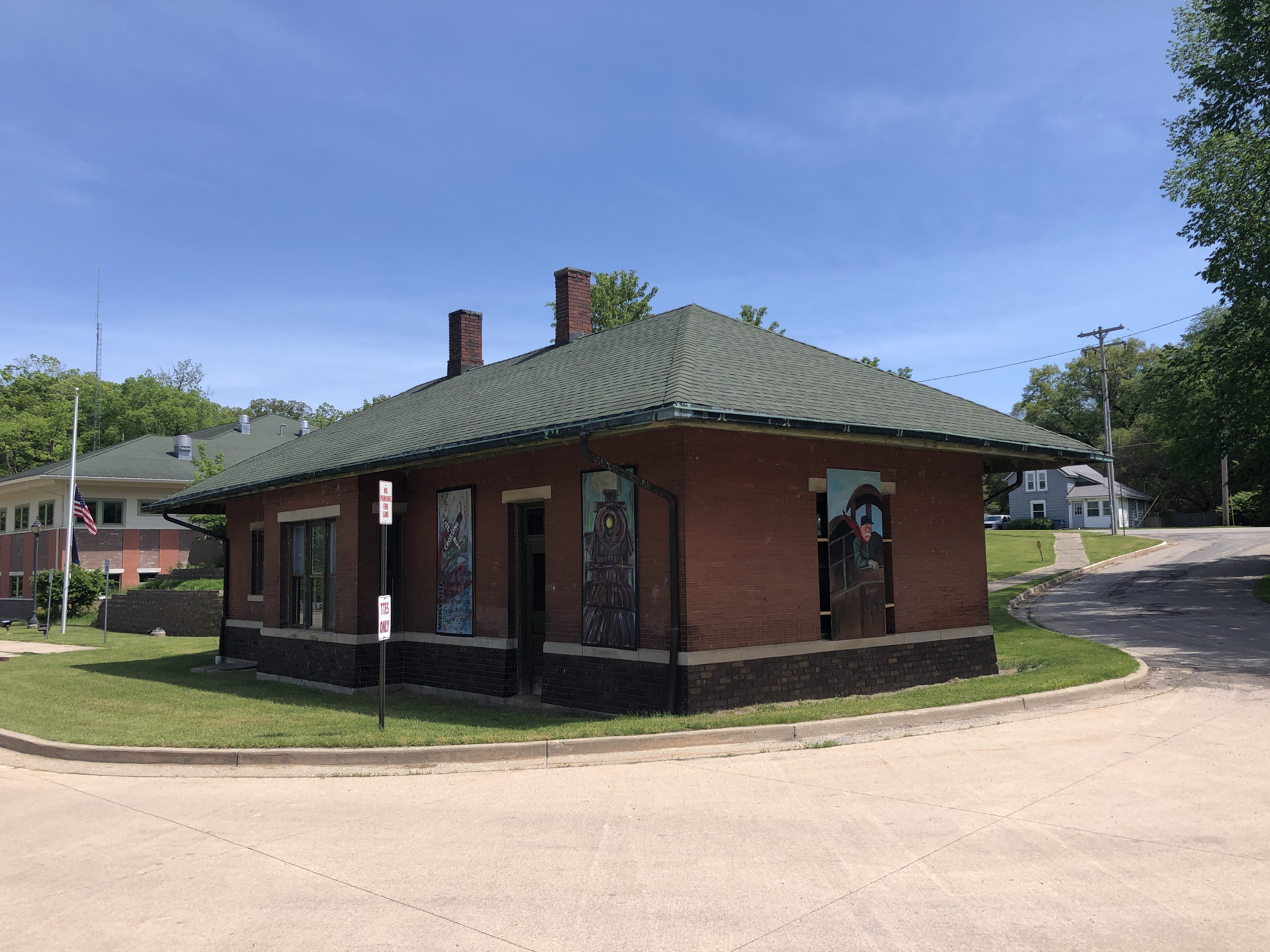
- Middleville Depot, 2022
- Interactive map
- Location: 128 High St., Middleville, Michigan
- Coordinates: 42°42′47″N 85°27′57″W
- Built: 1906
- Architectural style: Prairie style
- NRHP reference No.: 100007564
- Added to NRHP: March 23, 2022

The Michigan Central Railroad Middleville Depot is a former railroad depot constructed for the Michigan Central Railroad. It is located at 128 High Street in Middleville, Michigan. The building was listed on the National Register of Historic Places in 2022.

== History ==
In 1869, the Michigan Central Railroad constructed a line from Jackson to Grand Rapids that ran through Middleville. A depot was constructed in the town the next year to service both passengers and freight. However, by the turn of the century the old depot proved inadequate, and a new (current) Middleville railway station was constructed in 1906. However, as the automobile became more ubiquitous, the use of trains decreased. The Middleville station saw daily passenger service decline from five trains per day in the 1920s to only one by 1955. Passenger service was discontinued in 1959, and freight operations ceased in 1972.

The station was sold to a private owner in 1979, and by 1983 the tracks had been abandoned. In 2002 the depot was acquired by Thornapple Township, and in 2017 the village of Middleville acquired ownership. As of 2021, the village plans to rehabilitate the structure.

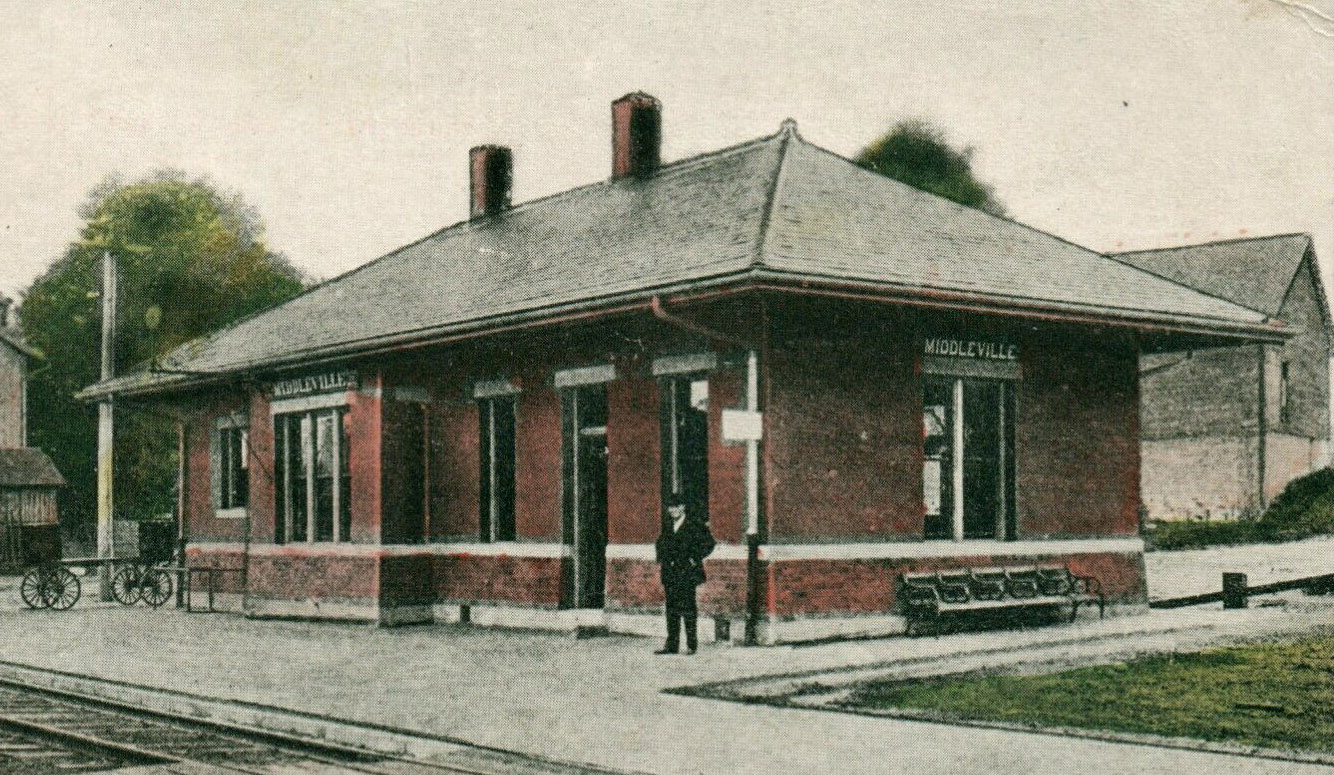
Middleville Depot c. 1908

== Description ==
The Middleville Depot is a single-story red brick Prairie style structure with a low-pitched hip roof and widely overhanging eaves. It is rectangular, measuring approximately twenty-five feet by fifty feet, and is six bays long. The upper portion of the walls are constructed from red brick, while the lower section of the walls are darker made from a darker red/black brick, and flare outwards slightly. Separating the sections is a stone belt course. The main entrance is located on the streetside elevation, and opposite there is a single-bay projection toward what was formerly the trackside.

Preceding station	New York Central Railroad	Following station
Caledonia toward Grand Rapids	MCR Grand Rapids Branch	Irving toward Jackson
