= Noahquageshik =

Chief of the Grand River Band of Ottawa Nation Native Americans

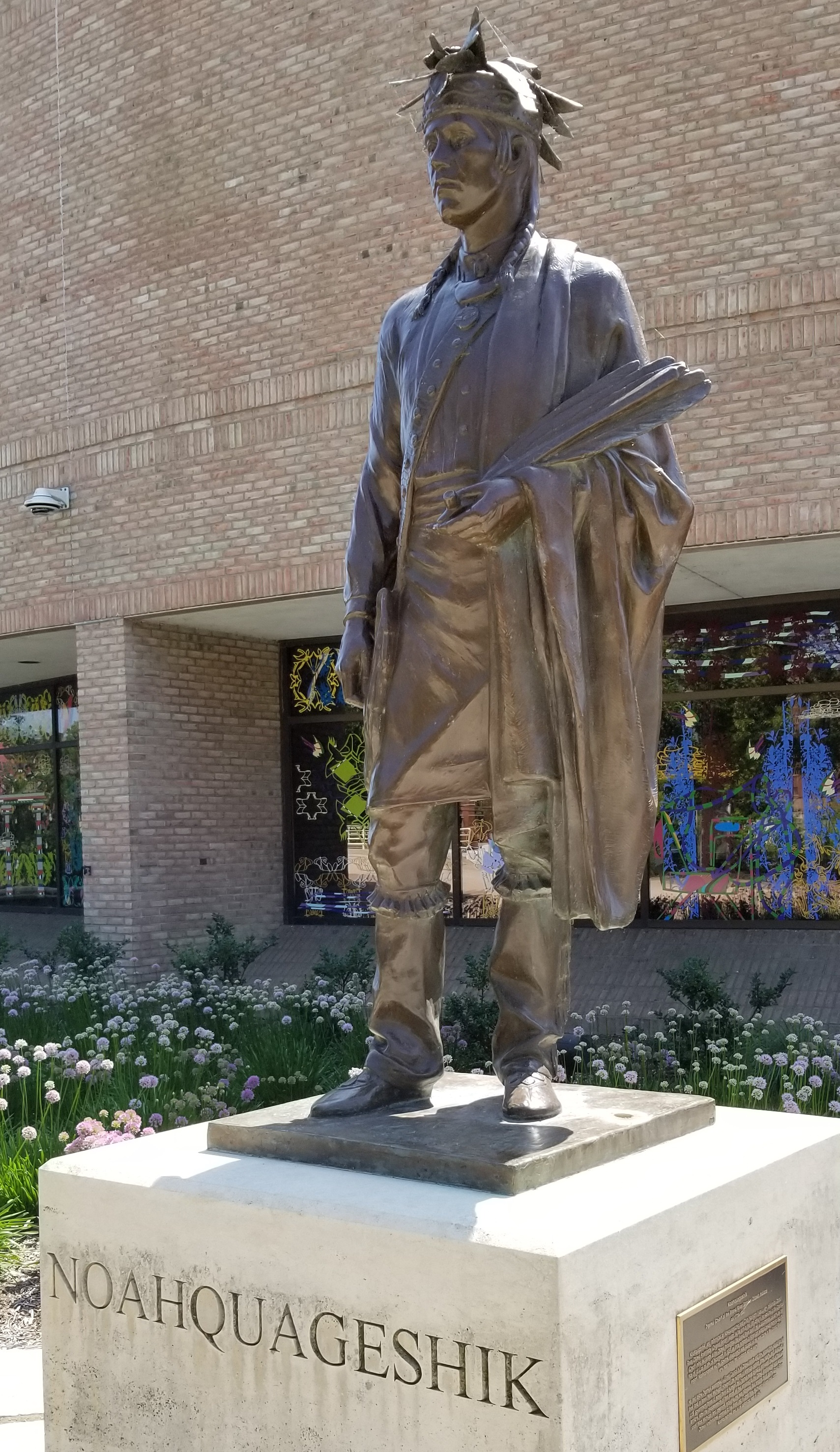
Bronze statue of Noahquageshik on Grand Valley State University's campus in downtown Grand Rapids

Noahquageshik (1755–1855 or 1770–1840), also spelled Nawehquageezhik, Nawehquageezhig, or Nowgeschick (from Naawakwegiizhig, "Noon-day" or "Noon-sky"), and better known as Chief Noonday, was a chief of the Grand River Band of Ottawa Nation Native Americans in what would become the U.S. state of Michigan.

== Biography ==
Noahquageshik spent much of his life in what would become Yankee Springs Township in western Michigan. He was one of the first Native American leaders to establish trade with European settlers in the area. In 1794, he was involved in the Battle of Fallen Timbers, which was the final battle of the Northwest Indian War. During the War of 1812, Noahquageshik was allied with Tecumseh during the Battle of the Thames. Tecumseh was killed in this battle, and Noahquageshik inherited his tomahawk and hat.

In 1821, several Grand River Ottawa, including Noahquageshik's fellow leader Keewaycooshcum, met with representatives of the United States in Chicago to negotiate the sale of tribal lands south of the Grand River in present-day central Michigan. Noahquageshik was hostile to the idea of a treaty ceding Ottawa land and rejected its terms. Nevertheless, the treaty was signed by other Ottawa leaders. Over the coming decades, it was violently enforced by the United States against the neighboring Potawatomi in what was later called the Trail of Death.

By 1836, the possibility that Ottawa from the L'Arbre Croche band in northern Michigan might promise the Grand River Ottawa's land north of the Grand River to the United States prompted Noahquageshik and other Grand River Ottawa leaders to write President Andrew Jackson a letter preemptively refusing the cede any land or remove their bands west of the Mississippi. However, after an especially harsh winter and a year-long outbreak of smallpox, the Grand River Ottawa's negotiation position was severely weakened. In March 1836, two dozen Ottawa travelled to Washington, D.C. to negotiate a potential treaty with the United States. The resulting treaty, in which the Ottawa agreed to sell the Grand River lands to the United States in exchange for five-year reservations in west and northwest Michigan, regular annuities, hunting rights, and access to a blacksmith, Western farming implements, and various other amenities to help smooth any integration efforts, was only loosely followed by both its parties. Noahquageshik, though not present in Washington during the treaty, was designated by the Grand River Ottawa in the treaty as a "first class" leader, and assigned to receive a $500 annuity for his tribe.

== Religious beliefs ==
As a condition of the 1821 treaty, the United States provided the Grand River Ottawa with money to construct a school and a missionary in Grand Rapids. Noahquageshik, who presided over a village in Grand Rapids called Bowting (from Baawiting, "at the rapids"), invited Reverend Leonard Slater, a Baptist missionary, to build a mission in the village. Noahquageshik was criticized by other members of the Grand River Ottawa for receiving and spending treaty annuities dispensed by the missionaries there.

In 1837, following the Treaty of Washington, Ottawa at Bowting split over management of the tribe. The Baptist Ottawa left with Noahquageshik to create the "Ottawa Colony" in modern-day Prairieville Township. Catholic and non-Christian Ottawa followed Noahquageshik's son-in-law, Megis Ininne (Miigis-inini, "Shell-Man"), a Catholic Ottawa leader.

== Legacy ==
The Chief Noonday Outdoor Center and Chief Noonday Recreational Heritage Route in that area are named after him. In 2010, sculptor Antonio Tobias Mendez completed a seven-foot-tall bronze statue of Noonday. The statue was placed near Grand Valley State University's Eberhard Center, along the Grand River in Grand Rapids. Part of the Grand Rapids Community Legends Program, the statue is one of 25 planned sculptures intended to educate the public about local historical figures.
