= Chris Winfrey =

American businessman (born 1976)

- Born: 1976 (age 49–50); Kentucky, U.S.
- Education: University of Florida (BS) University of Florida (MBA)
- Occupations: Businessman; Executive
- Title: President and CEO Charter Communications

Christopher L. Winfrey (born 1976) is an American business executive. He has been President & Chief Executive Officer of Charter Communications since December 2022 and was appointed to Charter's board of directors in November 2023.

== Early life and education ==
Winfrey was born in 1976 in Kentucky. He earned both a Bachelor of Science in Accounting and an MBA from the University of Florida, where he later joined the Business School Advisory Council.

== Career ==
=== Early career ===
Winfrey began his career in the cable industry in the United States, working as a senior associate in the private equity group at Communications Equity Associates. He subsequently moved into European cable, serving as a Director of Financial Planning and Analysis and Director of Operations Services for NTL Incorporated's continental European operations, and later as Senior Vice President of Corporate Finance and Development at Cablecom GmbH.

Before joining Charter, Winfrey served as Chief Financial Officer of Unitymedia GmbH, Germany's second-largest cable operator, and as Managing Director for Unitymedia's cable operations, broadcasting and satellite entities.

=== Charter Communications ===
Winfrey joined Charter Communications as Chief Financial Officer in 2010, taking responsibility for the company's accounting, financial planning and analysis, procurement, real estate, tax and treasury functions, as well as mergers and acquisitions, capital structure activities and investor relations. As CFO, he spearheaded Charter's transformative M&A activity, played an integral role in the Time Warner Cable and Bright House Networks integrations, and managed Charter's financial activities through a period of significant growth. Charter added oversight of its fiber-based Spectrum Enterprise business to his CFO responsibilities in 2019.

Winfrey was named Chief Operating Officer in 2021. In that role, he oversaw all cable operations, including marketing, sales, field operations, customer operations, and Spectrum Enterprise, and led the company's rural expansion initiative, including a $5 billion commitment as part of the Rural Digital Opportunity Fund (RDOF) to make gigabit broadband connectivity available to over one million currently unserved locations.

=== President and CEO ===
Winfrey was named President and Chief Executive Officer of Charter Communications, effective December 1, 2022, succeeding Tom Rutledge, who announced his retirement after a 50-year career and remained as Executive Chairman through November 2023.

Upon becoming CEO, Winfrey launched several investment initiatives, including the largest cable network expansion since the 1980s and the largest physical upgrade of broadband networks since the 1990s. He also initiated a Rural Construction Initiative driven by more than $7 billion in private investment to provide gigabit broadband connectivity to over 1.7 million mostly rural homes and small businesses.

Winfrey was also the architect of a new business model for video distribution designed to create more flexible packaging choices for Spectrum customers, and beginning in 2023 he led a series of distribution agreements with every major programmer for traditional TV networks and streaming services.

In December 2025, Charter Communications announced an amended employment agreement extending Winfrey's tenure as CEO through December 2028. Under the agreement, he receives a minimum annual base salary of $2.5 million and a target annual bonus opportunity of 300% of his base salary.

== See also ==
- Spectrum
- List of chief executive officers
