= Cyclo-cross =

Form of bicycle racing

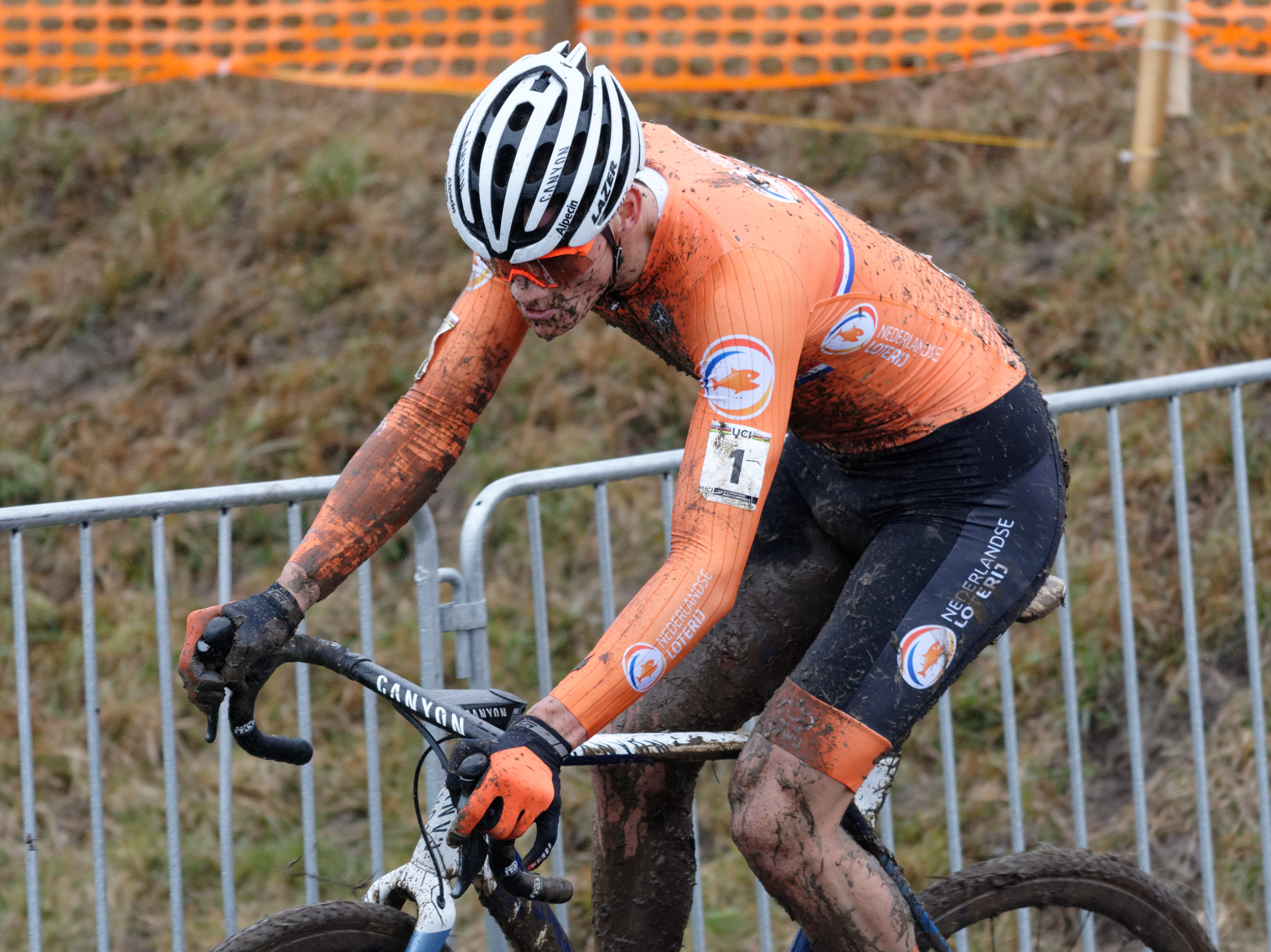
- Highest governing body: UCI
- Nicknames: CX, 'cross
- First races: Early 20th century

Characteristics
- Contact: No
- Mixed-sex: No
- Type: Cycle sport
- Equipment: Cyclo-cross bicycle
- Venue: Tracks with predominantly natural surface (grass, mud, sand), often featuring some man-made obstacles

Presence
- Country or region: Primarily Europe and North America
- Olympic: No

Cyclo-cross (cyclocross, CX, cyclo-X or 'cross) is a form of bicycle racing. Races typically take place in the autumn and winter (the international or "World Cup" season is October–February), and consist of many laps of a short (2.5–3.5 km or 1.5–2 mile) course featuring pavement, wooded trails, grass, steep hills and obstacles requiring the rider to quickly dismount, carry the bike while navigating the obstruction and remount. Races for senior categories are generally between 40 minutes and an hour long, with the distance varying depending on the ground conditions. The sport is strongest in the traditional road cycling countries such as Belgium (Flanders in particular), France and the Netherlands.

Cyclo-cross has parallels with mountain bike racing, cross-country cycling and criterium racing. Many of the best cyclo-cross riders cross train in other cycling disciplines; however, cyclo-cross has reached such size and popularity that some racers are specialists, and many prioritize cyclo-cross races over other disciplines. Cyclo-cross bicycles are similar to road racing bicycles: lightweight, with somewhat narrow tires and drop handlebars. They are typically differentiated by their greater tire clearances, lower gearing, stronger frames, cantilever brakes or disc brakes and more upright riding position. They also share characteristics with mountain bikes in that they use knobby tread tires for traction and disc brakes. They have to be lightweight because competitors need to carry their bicycle to overcome barriers or slopes too steep to climb in the saddle. The sight of competitors struggling up a muddy slope with bicycles on their shoulders is the classic image of the sport, although unridable sections are generally a very small fraction of the race distance.

Compared with many disciplines of road and track cycle racing, tactics are fairly straightforward, and the emphasis is on the rider's aerobic endurance and bike-handling skills. Drafting, where cyclists form a line with the lead cyclist pedaling harder while reducing the wind resistance for other riders, is of much less importance than in road racing where average speeds are much higher than in cyclo-cross.

A cyclo-cross rider is allowed to change bicycles and receive mechanical assistance during a race. While the rider is on the course on one bike, their pit crew can clean, repair and oil a spare.

== Origins and history ==
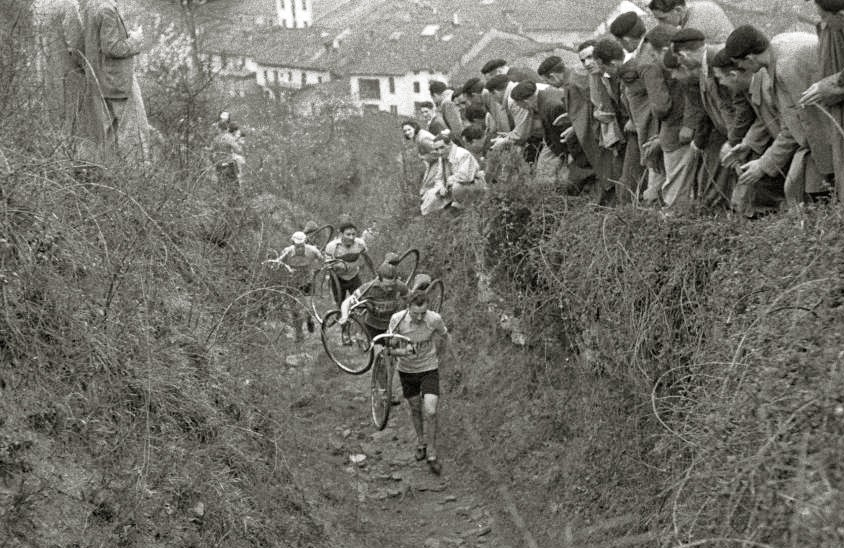
A cyclo-cross race in Oñati, Basque Country, Spain, in 1947

There are many stories about the origins of cyclo-cross. One is that European road racers in the early 1900s would race each other to the next town over from them and that they were allowed to cut through farmers' fields or over fences, or take any other shortcuts, in order to make it to the next town first. This was sometimes called steeple chase as the only visible landmark in the next town was often the steeple. This was a way for them to stay in shape during the winter months and put a twist on road racing. In addition, riding off-road in more difficult conditions than smooth pavement increased the intensity at which the cyclists were riding and improved their on-the-road bike handling abilities. Forced running sections, or portage, were incorporated to help deliver warm blood to the feet and toes, as well as exercise other groups of muscles. Daniel Gousseau of France is credited as having inspired the first cyclo-cross races and organized the first French National Championship in 1902. Géo Lefèvre, the originator of the idea for the Tour de France, also played a key role in the early days of the sport.

After Octave Lapize attributed his win in the 1910 Tour de France to his off season training in cyclo-cross the sport began to spread to countries bordering France. Belgium organized its first national championship in 1910, Switzerland did so in 1912, then Luxembourg in 1923, Spain in 1929 and Italy in 1930.

Cyclo-cross proved itself as a sport extending beyond the boundaries of France when in 1924 the first international race, Le Critérium International de Cross-Country Cyclo-Pédestre, was held in Paris.

Like many international cycle sports, cyclo-cross is administered by the Union Cycliste Internationale; although it was not until the 1940s, around 40 years after cyclo-cross' inception, that the UCI began its regulation and the first world championship was held in Paris in 1950.

The first United States Cyclo-cross National Championships took place on 20 October 1963, in Palos Park, IL, near Chicago. These championships in the midwest continued until 1969. Cyclo-cross began to become popular in the United States in the 1970s, in New England and California. The Cyclo-cross National Championships restarted in 1975 in Berkeley, CA and have continued to be held every year at various locations throughout the United States. The Surf City race series held in Santa Cruz, CA has contributed to the history of cyclo-cross in the United States. The sport has experienced a growth in popularity in the United States since the mid-1990s. Cyclo-cross races are now regularly held in the fall and winter seasons throughout the United States and continue to grow in popularity.

== Racing seasons ==
Cyclocross is typically an autumn and winter sport, the northern hemisphere season running from September to February. The World Championships take place in late January. The Canada championships are held in November with the US and UK championships held in January. In the United States, there is little racing after that except in states with year-round warm climates such as Florida and California. The cyclocross racing season within southern hemisphere nations typically runs from May to August.

Riders' age categories for cyclocross under UCI rules are currently determined by their age on 1 January which lies in the middle of the international season, i.e. they compete in the same category that they would be in for the following road season.

== Equipment ==
=== Bicycles ===
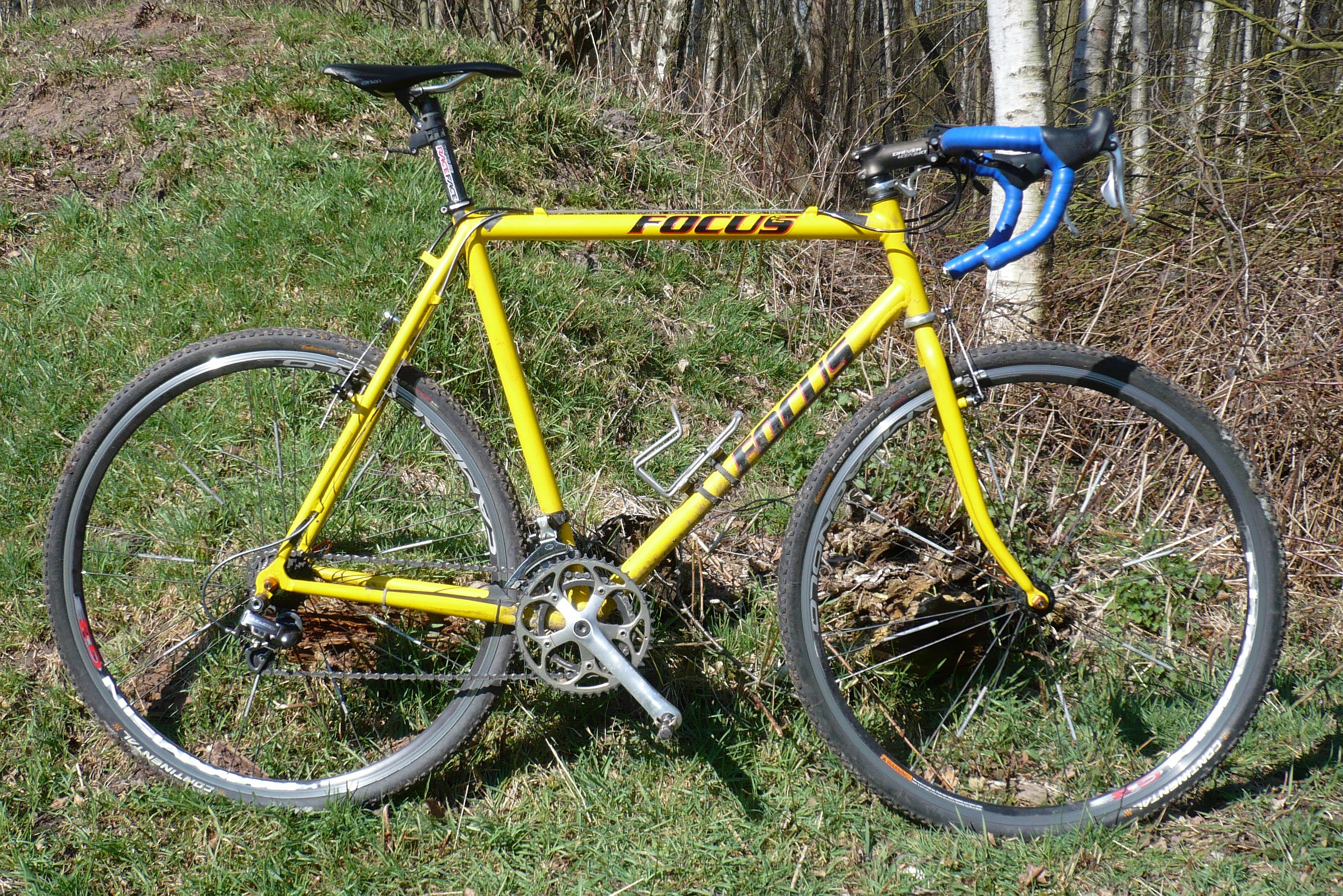
A Focus cyclo-cross bicycle

Cyclo-cross bicycles generally resemble road racing bicycles. Cyclo-cross-specific frames differ with their wider tire clearances, knobby tires, cantilever or disc brakes, and lower gearing. Cables are generally routed on the upper side of the top tube, which allows the rider to carry the bike comfortably on the right shoulder through portage sections, and prevents cable contamination by dirt. Popular on many cyclocross bikes is routing the brakes so that the right brake is often the front brake. This is done to allow the left hand to control speed while approaching obstacles requiring the bike to be carried, while the right hand grips the frame ready to lift the bike onto the shoulder as soon as the rider's feet touch the ground. As a high-end bicycle purpose-built for a specific sport competition, they also differ from ordinary "hybrid or trekking" cross bikes, which are general-purpose utility bikes fitted with slightly wider 700C tires for use on unpaved paths or trails.

Cyclo-cross bike design and frame geometry has evolved over the years. The first cyclo-cross bikes were touring-type road bikes, used for their cantilever bosses, slacker angles and wider tire clearance. Over time as the sport became more formalized, frame angles changed for quicker handling and bottom brackets heights were raised to clear broken ground. Most cyclo-cross frames have a non-compact (flat or near-flat top tube) frame design for easier shouldering. Some design features have recently begun to change, for example, a heightened bottom bracket was typical 10+ years ago; now many cyclo-cross-specific frames do not have elevated bottom brackets, in fact many have a lower bottom bracket than road racing bicycles; this is favorable since the lower seat height makes for easier remounting, and a lower center of gravity increases stability. Many cyclo-cross bicycles are now set up with a single chainring and chain "drop" guards. A single chainring setup simplifies mechanics and reduces the chance of the chain derailing on a bumpy course. People who do run a double chain-ring set up on their bicycles generally use a 36–46 gearing. Many professional-level cyclo-cross bikes are set up with deep-section carbon tubular wheels, not for the purpose of aerodynamics, but to keep the wheel from being entrapped in deep sand or mud sections. Tubular tires are used to avoid pinch flats, decrease rolling resistance and increase grip with lower tire pressures. In addition, single speed cyclo-cross bikes are becoming increasingly popular for a variety of reasons, including lower initial cost of setup, ease of use and maintenance, and decreased likelihood of mechanical failure on the course.

=== Clothing ===
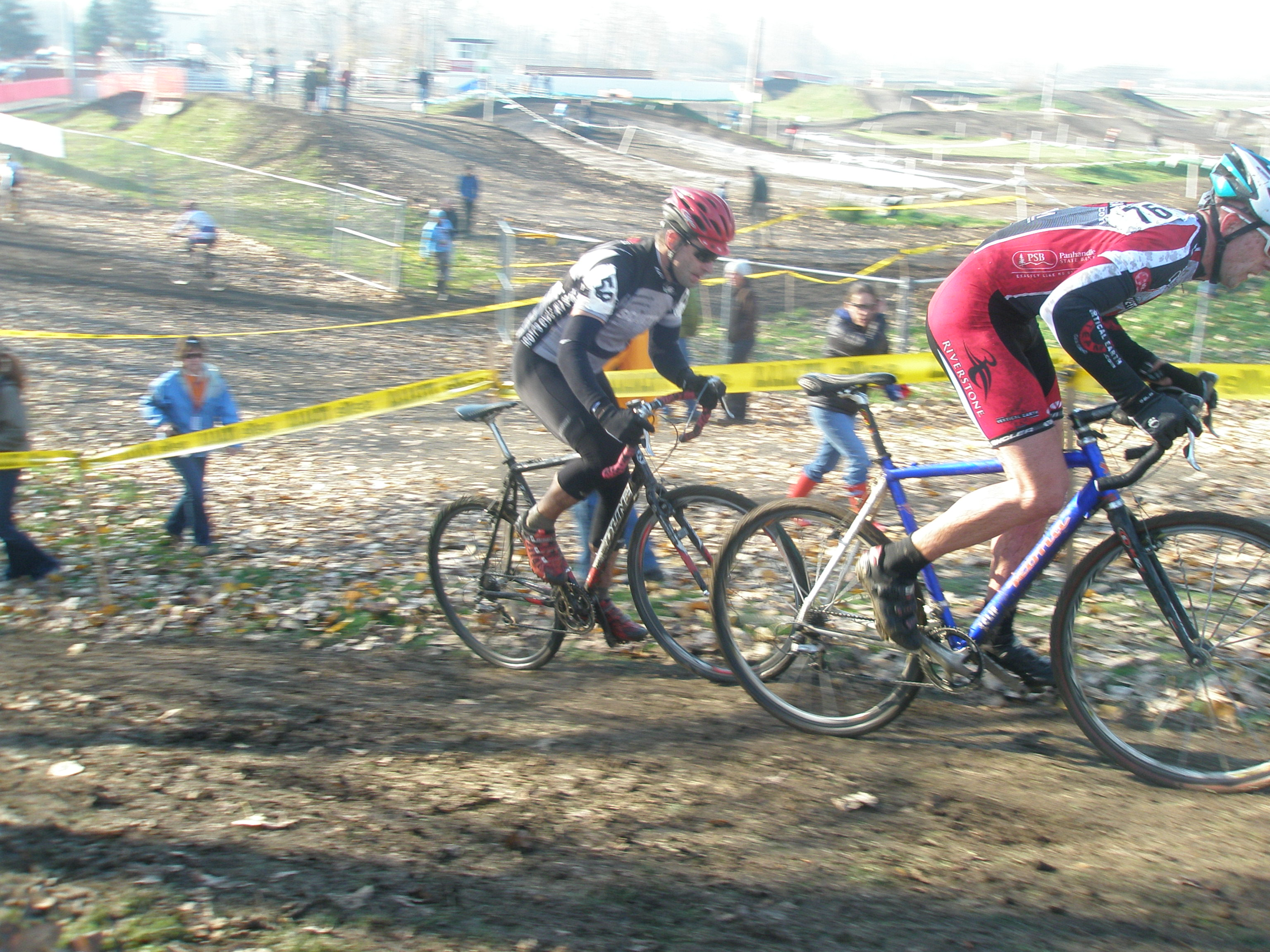
Cyclocross in Portland, Oregon

Clothing is similar to that of road racing. However, since cyclo-cross is a cold-weather sport there is an emphasis toward warmer clothing such as long sleeves, tights, knickers and arm and leg warmers. While many racers will use standard two-piece road kits, there is a very strong preference to wear one piece skinsuits to maximize freedom of movement. The other advantage of skinsuits is that they are tighter, preventing the jersey from getting caught on stray tree branches during some singletrack sections of the race course. The one piece construction of the skinsuit also prevents it from exposing the torso while the rider shoulders the bike. Mountain bike shoes are adopted, as they allow the competitors to run, unlike their road racing counterparts, and due to their degree of traction (compared to smooth bottoms found on road racing shoes). Toe spikes are used to aid in running up steep muddy slopes and in the adverse underfoot conditions. Full-finger gloves are optional but generally recommended for hand protection and for grip in muddy/wet situations. Experienced riders racing in dry conditions may eschew gloves, presumably for better tractional feedback though the handlebar, and more natural bike portage.

== Courses ==
Races usually consist of many laps over a short course, ending when a time limit is reached, rather than after a specific number of laps or certain distance; the typical length for senior events is one hour, with 30 and 45 minute races for lower categories being the norm. Generally each lap is around 2.5–3.5 km and is 90% rideable. Races run under UCI rules must have courses that are always at least 3 m wide to encourage passing at any opportunity, but sections of singletrack are common for small races in the US and Great Britain. A variety of terrain is typical, ranging from roads to paths with short steep climbs, off camber sections, many corners and, a defining feature, sections where the rider may need, or would be best advised to dismount and run while carrying the bike. Under-tire conditions include asphalt, hardpack dirt, grass, mud and sand. In comparison to cross-country mountain bike events, terrain is smoother. Less emphasis is put on negotiating rough or even rocky ground with more stress on increased speed and negotiating different types of technical challenges. Drafting is of far less strategic importance than in road racing, though it can still be employed in paved sections or extremely windy conditions. Instead, tactics are chiefly focused on line choice, pacing strategy, passing technique, and racers' ability to identify and exploit sections of the course that are conducive to attacking or recovery.

Each section of the course typically lasts no longer than a handful of seconds. For example, long climbs are avoided in favour of short, sharp inclines. Sections are generally linked together, or long straights broken up, with tight corners. This not only allows a standard length course to fit in a relatively small area, but also forces competitors to constantly change speed and effort. Accelerating out of corners, then having to decelerate for the next before accelerating again is a common theme.

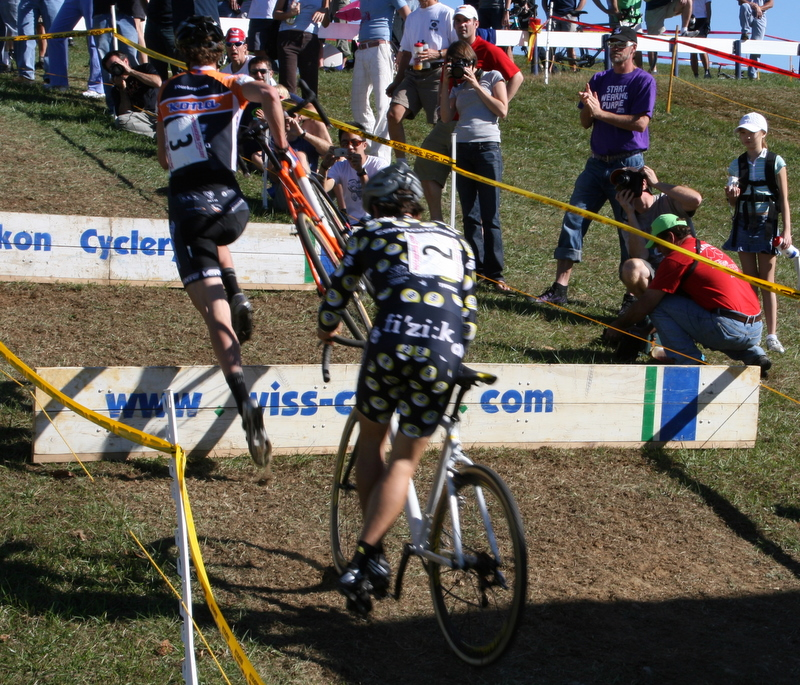
Cyclo-cross racers take on two barriers and a run-up at Ludwig's Corner in Pennsylvania

Obstacles that force a rider to dismount and run with their bike or to "bunny hop" include banks too steep to ride up, steps, sand pits and plank barriers. Besides the start/finish area, these obstacles may be placed anywhere on the course that the race director desires. Several race directors have tried to limit bunny hopping for safety reasons by placing barriers in pairs or in triple (although under UCI rule no more than two barriers can appear in succession). The maximum height for a barrier is 40 cm.

Since outside assistance is allowed, pits are included to provide a consistent area for this to occur. A pit to the right of the course is normal since most riders dismount to their left. In larger events a separate pit lane is featured so only those wishing a new bike or other assistance need enter the lane (this type was debuted at the Zeddam, Netherlands World Cup of January 1999). In some cases pits are provided in two different parts of the course.

Long-format races, in which riders compete cross country also exist. Examples include the Three Peaks Cyclo-Cross, a 61 km race, Barry-Roubaix, and the American UltraCX Championship Series which consists of seven stages ranging from 80 to 115 km.

== Technique ==
Cyclo-cross courses require specific technical abilities of competitors. For example, dirt single-track and streams are also sometimes integrated into the course, depending on the location, both of which require rider experience and technique. Some course sections may be extremely muddy, wet or snowy, and others are dusty and sandy. Most of these conditions are usually considered too extreme to be ridden with the standard 32c tire, and so much of the challenge of cyclo-cross lies in maintaining traction through loose or slippery terrain at speed.

Also common are steps, barriers, ditches, stairs, steep slopes and very deep mud or sand which all require running while carrying the bicycle. Therefore, the ability to fluidly dismount at speed, pick up and carry the bike, then put it back down and remount without losing momentum is key, and a faulty or slow dismount/remount may cost valuable seconds, waste energy or cause the competitor to crash. Often, when sections are extremely technical or become impossible to ride due to erosion from repeated wear or inclement weather, the racer will carry the bike and jog for an extended time to save energy.

A more recent development to overcome obstacles such as barriers and sometimes ditches is the bunnyhop, a technique which came to prominence in 1989 when Danny De Bie used it in his successful World Championship run. Bunny hopping has become less popular as a result of race directors seeking to prevent its use by setting up two or three barriers in a row. Skilled riders are still able to hop the obstacles, despite the back to back to back barriers. Many riders, such as Sven Nys, an ex-BMX racer, were known for their technical skill in bunny-hopping over various obstacles.

== Pitting ==
Sometimes, when a bike is damaged or clogged with debris, riders can enter the pits (usually sign-posted or between flags) and clean their bike or switch to another bike. Much like road racing, cyclists may have a support team. However, unlike road racing, the support team is confined to the pits.

== Status as an Olympic sport ==
Unlike mountain bike racing, cyclo-cross is not an Olympic sport. There have been recent efforts by the UCI to promote cyclo-cross as a potential Winter Olympic sport, since most competitive cyclo-cross is held during the winter season, and events have been held on frozen and snow-covered terrain. During the 2021–22 UCI Cyclo-cross World Cup season, an event was held at Val di Sole in Italy on a fully snow-covered course: the event was described as a proof of concept for cyclo-cross as a Winter Olympic sport.

In 2024, UCI president David Lappartient renewed his pitch for cyclo-cross as a Winter Olympic event, pursuing it as a potential discretionary event for the 2030 Winter Olympics in the French Alps; the bid has received an endorsement from the French Alps 2030 organizing committee's president Michel Barnier. The bid, along with a related bid by World Athletics to pursue a revival of cross country running as a Winter Olympic event, has faced criticism: in 2025, the Winter Olympic Federations (WOF) issued a joint statement denouncing both proposals, arguing that they did not constitute a snow or ice sport, and that their inclusion would "dilute" the heritage and identity of the Winter Olympic Games.

== Notable Cyclo-cross races ==
- UCI Cyclo-cross World Championships
- Major season-long series:
  - UCI Cyclo-cross World Cup
  - Superprestige (Belgium)
  - Cyclo-cross Trophy (Belgium)
- Continental events:
  - European Cyclo-cross Championships
  - Pan American Cyclo-cross Championships
- National Cyclo-cross Championships
- Other competitions:
  - USCX Cyclocross Series (United States)
  - HSF System Cup (Czechia)
  - Exact Cross (Belgium and Netherlands)
  - Coupe de France de cyclo-cross (France)
  - Copa de España de Ciclocross (Spain)
  - MFG Cyclocross (United States)
  - Cross Crusade (United States)
  - SSCXWC (Singlespeed Cyclocross World Championship)
- Past events:
  - U.S. Gran Prix of Cyclocross (United States)
  - EKZ CrossTour (Switzerland)

== See also ==
- Gravel cycling
