= Marcus Cable =

American television provider from 1982 to 1999

Marcus Cable Company
- Industry: Cable television
- Founded: 1982
- Defunct: 1999
- Fate: Merged with Charter Communications, systems now part of Spectrum
- Successor: Charter Communications
- Headquarters: Dallas, Texas, USA
- Key people: Jeffrey A. Marcus

Marcus Cable Company was an American cable television provider headquartered in Dallas, Texas, and founded by Jeffrey A. Marcus and the Milwaukee-based Marcus Corporation. It was the nation's largest closely held cable-television company and the ninth largest over all, with 1.1 million customers in 18 states, with its principal markets in Wisconsin, southern California, Alabama, Indiana, Tennessee, and Fort Worth, Texas. In 1994, Marcus, along with Charter Communications acquired the cable assets of Crown Media, a division of Hallmark Cards. In 1995, Marcus acquired the cable assets of Sammons Communications, which was also based in Dallas, for $1 billion. In April 1998, entrepreneur Paul Allen purchased Marcus Cable for $2.775 billion through his investment arm Vulcan Ventures. In February 1999, Marcus Cable was merged with Vulcan's Charter Communications.
