= Daniel Gousseau =

Daniel Gousseau (died August 3, 1969), a French army private and later secretary-general of the French Cycling Union, is credited as having invented the sport of cyclo-cross.

Gousseau organized the first French National Cyclo-Cross Championships in sport.
