= Thornapple Township, Michigan =

- Township
- Location within the state of Michigan
- Coordinates: 42°43′24″N 85°28′50″W
- Country: United States
- State: Michigan
- County: Barry

Area
  - Total: 35.9 sq mi (93.1 km^{2})
  - Land: 35.3 sq mi (91.4 km^{2})
  - Water: 0.66 sq mi (1.7 km^{2})
- Elevation: 748 ft (228 m)

Population (2020)
  - Total: 9,331
  - Density: 264/sq mi (102/km^{2})
- Time zone: UTC-5 (Eastern (EST))
  - Summer (DST): UTC-4 (EDT)
- FIPS code: 26-79620
- GNIS feature ID: 1627162
- Website: www.thornapple-twp.org

Thornapple Township is a civil township of Barry County in the U.S. state of Michigan. The population was 9,331 at the 2020 census. It is the most populous township in Barry County.

== Geography ==
Thornapple Township is located in the northwest corner of Barry County. It includes the village of Middleville. Michigan state highway M-37 passes through the center of the township, leading southeast 11 miles (18 km) to Hastings, the county seat, and 22 miles (35 km) north to downtown Grand Rapids. The Thornapple River, a tributary of the Grand River, flows from south to north through the middle of the township.

According to the United States Census Bureau, Thornapple Township has a total area of 35.9 square miles (93.1 km^{2}), of which 35.3 square miles (91.4 km^{2}) is land and 0.66 square miles (1.7 km^{2}), or 1.80%, is water.

== Demographics ==
Historical population
Census	Pop.	Note	%±
2000	6,685		—
2010	7,884		17.9%
2020	9,331		18.4%

As of the census of 2000, there were 6,685 people, 2,292 households, and 1,835 families residing in the township. The population density was 188.3 inhabitants per square mile (72.7/km^{2}). There were 2,383 housing units at an average density of 67.1 per square mile (25.9/km^{2}). The racial makeup of the township was 96.89% White, 0.15% African American, 0.42% Native American, 0.46% Asian, 0.06% Pacific Islander, 0.63% from other races, and 1.39% from two or more races. Hispanic or Latino of any race were 1.41% of the population.

There were 2,292 households, out of which 43.2% had children under the age of 18 living with them, 68.1% were married couples living together, 7.9% had a female householder with no husband present, and 19.9% were non-families. 16.6% of all households were made up of individuals, and 6.5% had someone living alone who was 65 years of age or older. The average household size was 2.91 and the average family size was 3.29.

In the township the population was spread out, with 31.7% under the age of 18, 8.3% from 18 to 24, 31.1% from 25 to 44, 21.2% from 45 to 64, and 7.6% who were 65 years of age or older. The median age was 33 years. For every 100 females, there were 98.7 males. For every 100 females age 18 and over, there were 97.6 males.

The median income for a household in the township was $53,333, and the median income for a family was $58,171. Males had a median income of $44,212 versus $26,861 for females. The per capita income for the township was $20,782. About 3.7% of families and 4.9% of the population were below the poverty line, including 4.8% of those under age 18 and 9.8% of those age 65 or over.
