= Cobridge Communications =

American telecommunications provider

- Industry: Telecommunications
- Founded: 2010
- Defunct: May 31, 2012
- Fate: Defunct; assets purchased by Fidelity Communications, now part of Cable One
- Successor: Fidelity Communications
- Headquarters: St. Louis, Missouri, MO, United States
- Key people: Scott Widham (founder and CEO; Bruce Herman (CFO); Mark Barber (COO); Chad Rycenga (CIO); Linda Kondrick (chief accounting officer); Paul Belle Isle (vice president of marketing); Larry Schutz (vice president of technology
- Products: Cable television HDTV; Digital telephone High-speed Internet

Cobridge Communications was a cable television, high-speed internet, and digital telephone service provider in the United States.

== History and acquisitions ==
On October 22, 2010, Charter Communications announced completion of the sale of cable systems serving approximately 65,000 customers in seven states to Cobridge Communications, LLC. The 36 head ends acquired by Cobridge are located in Alabama, Arkansas, Georgia, Louisiana, Missouri, Ohio and Texas. As a result of this sale, Charter no longer operates in Arkansas and Ohio.

== Fidelity Communications Merger ==
In May 2012, Cobridge had all of its markets bought by Fidelity Communications. All of the Cobridge customers went through a transition to Fidelity Communications and the Cobridge brand is now defunct.
