= Yankee Springs Recreation Area =

Protected area in Michigan, United States

Yankee Springs State Recreation Area
- Location within Michigan Location within the United States
- Location: Yankee Springs Township, Barry County, Michigan, USA
- Nearest city: Middleville, Michigan
- Coordinates: 42°36′46″N 85°29′28″W
- Area: 5,200 acres (2,100 ha)
- Established: 1943
- Governing body: Michigan Department of Natural Resources
- Website: Official website

Yankee Springs State Recreation Area is a state-managed protected area located in Yankee Springs Township in Barry County, Michigan.

The park is 5,200 acres (21 km^{2}) in area. It has 120 rustic, 200 modern and 25 equestrian camping sites, plus two cabins. There are 30 miles (48 km) of cross-county ski/hiking trails, 12 miles (19 km) of mountain biking trails and 9 miles (14 km) of equestrian trails. 6 miles (9.7 km) of the North Country Trail pass through the park. 30 miles (48 km) or more of seasonal two lane roads open to any road legal vehicles and is a popular destination for Enduro Riders. Nine lakes, Gun Lake being the largest, provide fishing, boating and swimming.

Points of interest in the park include the Devil's Soupbowl, a glacially carved kettle formation, Graves Hill Scenic Overlook, The Pines and Civilian Conservation Corps (CCC) era buildings.

The park hosted the annual Barry-Roubaix cycling race for several years, prior to the event moving to Hastings, MI to accommodate a larger number of participants; the race course still traverses parts of the recreation area.

== History ==
In the 1830s, the Yankee Springs area was opened up for homesteading. By the 1930s the land was eroded and depleted from farming. The federal government acquired the land and the CCC began reforesting the area. In 1943 the land was turned over to the State of Michigan and became a park in the state park system.

== Facilities and activities ==
Facilities and activities include a beach area, fishing, boating, hiking, camping, equestrian, permanent orienteering course, mountain bike trails, and in winter, cross country ski trails, snowshoeing, and groomed fatbike trails.
