= Middleville, Michigan =

Village in Thornapple Township, Michigan, US

- Village
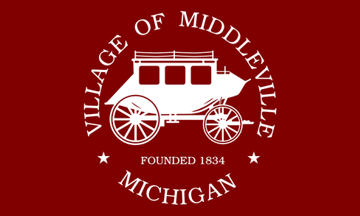
- Flag

- Location of Middleville, Michigan
- Coordinates: 42°42′54″N 85°27′53″W
- Country: United States
- State: Michigan
- County: Barry

Area
  - Village: 2.56 sq mi (6.63 km^{2})
  - Land: 2.44 sq mi (6.32 km^{2})
  - Water: 0.12 sq mi (0.31 km^{2})
- Elevation: 764 ft (233 m)

Population (2020)
  - Village: 4,295
  - Density: 1,760.1/sq mi (679.56/km^{2})
  - Metro: 988,938 (Grand Rapids Metro)
- Time zone: UTC-5 (Eastern (EST))
  - Summer (DST): UTC-4 (EDT)
- ZIP Code: 49333
- Area code: Area code 269 (Formerly 616)
- FIPS code: 26-53760
- GNIS feature ID: 0632281
- Website: www.villageofmiddleville.org

Middleville is a village in Thornapple Township, Barry County, in the U.S. state of Michigan. Middleville is part of the Grand Rapids metropolitan area. The population was 4,295 at the 2020 census.

== History ==
The first white settler to own land in the village was Calvin G. Hill, a native of New York, who bought 400 acres (1.6 km^{2}) in 1834 on both sides of the Thornapple River. The village was likely surveyed and subdivided before 1850, but the plat was not officially recorded until 1859. Prior to 1843, the settlement was often called "Thornapple". The name Middleville was at first given to a post office on the stage coach line between Grand Rapids and Kalamazoo. The post office was located at the house of Benjamin S. Dibble in section 2 in northeast Yankee Springs Township. Dibble had agreed to accept the post office at the request of U.S. Representative Lucius Lyon, of Kent County. Lyon suggested the name "Dibbleville", but Dibble disliked that name. "Middleville" was suggested because of the proximity of an Indian village known as "Middle Village" on Scales Prairie near the boundary line between Thornapple and Yankee Springs townships. Dibble was appointed postmaster in July 1839 and continued until 1842. The next postmaster, John W. Bradley, continued to maintain the post office at Dibble's house until 1843, when it was moved to the present village of Middleville, with Calvin G. Hill as the postmaster. The village afterwards became known by the name of the post office. The location of the original Indian village is NNE a few hundred yards of the present day intersection where Norris Rd. ends at Adams Rd. https://www.dnr.state.mi.us/spatialdatalibrary/pdf_maps/glo_plats/barry/04n10w.pdf

== Geography ==
According to the United States Census Bureau, the village has a total area of 2.40 square miles (6.22 km^{2}), of which 2.28 square miles (5.91 km^{2}) is land and 0.12 square miles (0.31 km^{2}) is water.

Several West Michigan television stations have their transmitting towers in the Middleville area, including: WOOD-TV and WXMI.

== Demographics ==
Historical population
Census	Pop.	Note	%±
1870	541		—
1880	712		31.6%
1890	678		−4.8%
1900	829		22.3%
1910	804		−3.0%
1920	833		3.6%
1930	804		−3.5%
1940	833		3.6%
1950	1,047		25.7%
1960	1,196		14.2%
1970	1,865		55.9%
1980	1,797		−3.6%
1990	1,966		9.4%
2000	2,721		38.4%
2010	3,319		22.0%
2020	4,295		29.4%
U.S. Decennial Census

=== 2020 census ===
As of the 2020 census, Middleville had a population of 4,295. The median age was 31.6 years. 30.0% of residents were under the age of 18 and 11.6% of residents were 65 years of age or older. For every 100 females there were 91.9 males, and for every 100 females age 18 and over there were 89.7 males age 18 and over.

0.0% of residents lived in urban areas, while 100.0% lived in rural areas.

There were 1,555 households in Middleville, of which 40.1% had children under the age of 18 living in them. Of all households, 46.9% were married-couple households, 16.5% were households with a male householder and no spouse or partner present, and 28.0% were households with a female householder and no spouse or partner present. About 23.6% of all households were made up of individuals and 9.3% had someone living alone who was 65 years of age or older.

There were 1,595 housing units, of which 2.5% were vacant. The homeowner vacancy rate was 0.3% and the rental vacancy rate was 1.4%.

Racial composition as of the 2020 census
Race	Number	Percent
White	3,835	89.3%
Black or African American	40	0.9%
American Indian and Alaska Native	15	0.3%
Asian	40	0.9%
Native Hawaiian and Other Pacific Islander	2	0.0%
Some other race	94	2.2%
Two or more races	269	6.3%
Hispanic or Latino (of any race)	231	5.4%

=== 2010 census ===
As of the census of 2010, there were 3,319 people, 1,268 households, and 872 families residing in the village. The population density was 1,455.7 inhabitants per square mile (562.0/km^{2}). There were 1,449 housing units at an average density of 635.5 per square mile (245.4/km^{2}). The racial makeup of the village was 95.3% White, 0.2% African American, 0.7% Native American, 0.7% Asian, 1.1% from other races, and 2.0% from two or more races. Hispanic or Latino of any race were 4.4% of the population.

There were 1,268 households, of which 41.2% had children under the age of 18 living with them, 48.7% were married couples living together, 13.2% had a female householder with no husband present, 6.8% had a male householder with no wife present, and 31.2% were non-families. Of all households 27.1% were made up of individuals, and 13.8% had someone living alone who was 65 years of age or older. The average household size was 2.61 and the average family size was 3.16.

The median age in the village was 32.4 years. 30.5% of residents were under the age of 18; 7.3% were between the ages of 18 and 24; 28.2% were from 25 to 44; 21.8% were from 45 to 64; and 12.2% were 65 years of age or older. The gender makeup of the village was 48.5% male and 51.5% female.

=== 2000 census ===
As of the census of 2000, there were 2,721 people, 998 households, and 711 families residing in the village. The population density was 1,313.7 inhabitants per square mile (507.2/km^{2}). There were 1,050 housing units at an average density of 506.9 per square mile (195.7/km^{2}). The racial makeup of the village was 95.74% White, 0.18% African American, 0.44% Native American, 0.74% Asian, 1.18% from other races, and 1.73% from two or more races. Hispanic or Latino of any race were 2.17% of the population.

There were 998 households, out of which 42.4% had children under the age of 18 living with them, 52.6% were married couples living together, 12.7% had a female householder with no husband present, and 28.7% were non-families. Of all households 24.5% were made up of individuals, and 10.0% had someone living alone who was 65 years of age or older. The average household size was 2.72 and the average family size was 3.28.

In the village, the population was spread out, with 32.2% under the age of 18, 10.5% from 18 to 24, 32.3% from 25 to 44, 16.5% from 45 to 64, and 8.5% who were 65 years of age or older. The median age was 30 years. For every 100 females, there were 95.6 males. For every 100 females age 18 and over, there were 93.7 males.

The median income for a household in the village was $41,947, and the median income for a family was $46,357. Males had a median income of $34,750 versus $21,883 for females. The per capita income for the village was $17,005. About 3.4% of families and 4.5% of the population were below the poverty line, including 4.3% of those under age 18 and 7.9% of those age 65 or over.

== Education ==
Middleville is served by Thornapple Kellogg School District.

There are six schools in Middleville, divided by grade level. They are:

- Early Childhood Center: 3 year old program, Preschool GSRP, Spe. Ed Half day program
- McFall Elementary: young fives, kindergarten and 1st grade
- Lee Elementary: 2nd and 3rd grades
- Page Elementary: 4th and 5th grades
- Thornapple-Kellogg Middle School: 6th through 8th grades
- Thornapple-Kellogg High School: 9th through 12th grades

== Recreation ==
Middleville is 5 miles (8.0 km) from one end of the developed part of the Paul Henry-Thornapple Trail. A parking area for the trail is behind the Village Hall. Public restrooms are in the hall and the Village is further developing the Trail, adding a pavilion, repairing bridges, and paving more of the trail. A three-mile (5 km) section is already blacktopped, and is popular with roller-bladers, bikers, runners and walkers. The Middleville section runs along the Thornapple River and has three bridges. It has been called one of Michigan's most beautiful rail trails.

The village has a nine-hole disc golf course and a skate park in Village parks. Both are free.

Middleville is between the Middleville State Game Area and the Yankee Springs State Game, and Recreation, Areas. The Barry County SGAs are known for the number and size of the deer, so they are popular with deer hunters. The SGAs also offer turkey, grouse, squirrel, goose, duck, rabbit and raccoon hunting opportunities.

The Thornapple-Kellogg Middle School hosts the National 24-Hour Challenge bicycling event, held annually on Father's Day weekend.

== Camp Manitou-Lin ==
Camp Manitou-Lin is located in Middleville, Michigan, United States, approximately 30 miles south of Grand Rapids. Operated by the YMCA, it was founded in 1913 as a summer camp on the shores of Old Lake Barlow. The camp is at least 160 acres (0.65 km^{2}).

From 2011 onwards the camp has run a free program for the children of wounded, disabled or killed military personnel.

== Notable people ==
- Chad Curtis, former professional baseball player
- Allie Dragoo, Professional Cyclist – USA Cycling, Sho-Air Twenty20 (attended Middleville schools through Middle School before moving to East Grand Rapids)
- F. A. Harper, academic, economist, and writer.

== General references ==
- Johnson, Crisfield (2005) [1880]. History of Allegan and Barry counties, Michigan. Ann Arbor, Mich.: University of Michigan Library.
- Potter, William W. (2005) [1912?]. History of Barry County. Ann Arbor, Mich.: University of Michigan Library.
