= Gun Lake (Michigan) =

Lake in Barry County, Michigan, United States of America

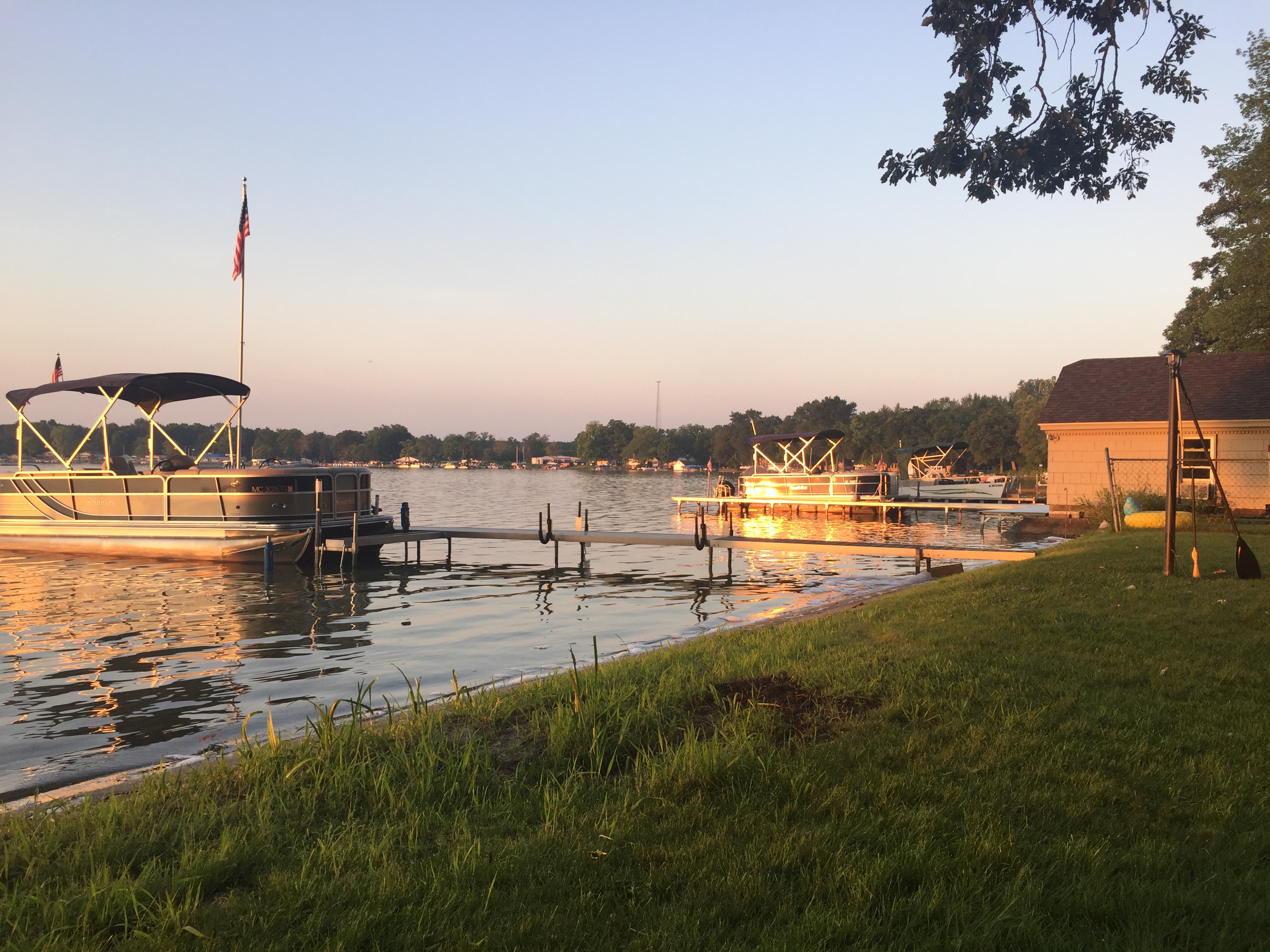
- Gun Lake, Michigan, at sunrise.

- Location within Michigan Location within the United States
- Location: Barry / Allegan counties, Michigan
- Coordinates: 42°36′N 85°31′W
- Type: Lake
- Basin countries: United States
- Surface area: 2,680 acres (10.8 km^{2})
- Max. depth: 66 ft (20 m)
- Surface elevation: 745 ft (227 m)

Gun Lake is a lake in the U.S. state of Michigan, located mostly in Barry County with the southwestern tip extending into Allegan County. Along most of the lake are numerous summer homes, cottages, and permanent residences. The Yankee Springs Recreation Area is based on northeastern portions of the lake. Gun Lake is the location of a State Park with a boat launch, two beaches, a campground, and picnic areas.

== Features ==
Gun Lake has two halves that are somewhat symmetrical and shaped like the wings of a butterfly. In the southeast quarter is an island known as "Party Island" to those that do not own it. The owner has since then filed a complaint, and the island is no longer open to the public. Hence the name "Party Island" was retired early summer of 2010. On the weekends many boats gather there because of the shallow, sandy rim around the island. Its official name is Orangeville Island. Other than Robbin's Bay, popular fishing spots include Pickerel Cove on the southern shore, Bairds Cove on the left "wing" of the lake, and the many channels that protrude off the "butterfly" part of the lake. It is a popular tourist destination in the summer. The shops and businesses sprinkled along the shores and inland enjoy that time of year. In the winter, there are other activities such as Winterfest - where events such as a polar bear dip take place, and ice fishing.

== Fishery ==
In the lake there are populations of black bullhead, black crappie, bluegill, bowfin, brown bullhead, green sunfish, largemouth bass, longnose gar, muskie, northern pike, rock bass, smallmouth bass, spotted gar, walleye, and yellow perch. Freshwater crustaceans, known as crayfish, also have some residency in the lake, and can be found in many of the shallows in the summertime as their young grow.

The lake is most famous for its large walleye population, although according to the last Michigan DNR report in 1991, they only make up about 8.6 percent of the lake's fish. Bullheads are the most prosperous species in the lake, although many of the other species exists peacefully despite their lower percentage of existence.

== Neighboring lakes ==
A number of other lakes are closely connected to Gun Lake. An inlet leads to nearby Payne Lake, and also to Fish rearing ponds. The lake's outlet is into the Gun River, which connects by the Kalamazoo River to Lake Michigan. The largest nearby lake is Long Lake. In recent years, a small culvert was erected under the road separating Gun and Long Lakes in the Northeast corner of Gun Lake. It leads under the road, and is an easy gateway to get to Long Lake.

== See also ==
- List of lakes in Michigan
