= Yankee Springs Township, Michigan =

- Township
- Location within the state of Michigan
- Coordinates: 42°37′52″N 85°30′41″W
- Country: United States
- State: Michigan
- County: Barry

Area
  - Total: 35.9 sq mi (92.9 km^{2})
  - Land: 31.0 sq mi (80.4 km^{2})
  - Water: 4.8 sq mi (12.4 km^{2})
- Elevation: 758 ft (231 m)

Population (2020)
  - Total: 5,322
  - Density: 171/sq mi (66.2/km^{2})
- Time zone: UTC-5 (Eastern (EST))
  - Summer (DST): UTC-4 (EDT)
- ZIP code: 49333
- Area code: 269
- FIPS code: 26-89020
- GNIS feature ID: 1627297
- Website: www.yankeespringstwp.org

Yankee Springs Township is a civil township of Barry County, Michigan, United States. The population was 5,322 at the 2020 census.

== Geography ==
According to the United States Census Bureau, the township has a total area of 35.9 square miles (92.9 km^{2}), of which 31.0 square miles (80.4 km^{2}) is land and 4.8 square miles (12.4 km^{2}), or 13.37%, is water, consisting of several lakes in the western half of the township, the largest of which is Gun Lake. Yankee Springs Recreation Area occupies 5,200 acres (2,100 ha) along much of the shore of Gun Lake and to the north and east.

== Demographics ==
As of the census of 2000, there were 4,219 people, 1,628 households, and 1,253 families residing in the township. The population density was 134.0 inhabitants per square mile (51.7/km^{2}). There were 2,182 housing units at an average density of 69.3 per square mile (26.8/km^{2}). The racial makeup of the township was 97.35% White, 0.26% African American, 0.36% Native American, 0.19% Asian, 0.02% Pacific Islander, 0.45% from other races, and 1.37% from two or more races. Hispanic or Latino of any race were 1.56% of the population.

There were 1,628 households, out of which 33.0% had children under the age of 18 living with them, 65.7% were married couples living together, 6.9% had a female householder with no husband present, and 23.0% were non-families. 18.1% of all households were made up of individuals, and 5.9% had someone living alone who was 65 years of age or older. The average household size was 2.59 and the average family size was 2.92.

In the township the population was spread out, with 26.1% under the age of 18, 6.7% from 18 to 24, 29.6% from 25 to 44, 25.5% from 45 to 64, and 12.1% who were 65 years of age or older. The median age was 37 years. For every 100 females, there were 100.0 males. For every 100 females age 18 and over, there were 98.5 males.

The median income for a household in the township was $52,661, and the median income for a family was $57,558. Males had a median income of $40,691 versus $31,250 for females. The per capita income for the township was $25,100. About 2.8% of families and 2.5% of the population were below the poverty line, including 2.0% of those under age 18 and 2.1% of those age 65 or over.
