= Business routes of U.S. Route 131 =

Routes of a highway in Michigan

Business US Highway 131
- Business routes of US 131 highlighted

Location
- Country: United States
- State: Michigan

Highway system
- United States Numbered Highway System; List; Special; Divided; Michigan State Trunkline Highway System; Interstate; US; State; Byways
← US 131	→ M-131

There are six business routes of US Highway 131 in the state of Michigan, and previously there was one bypass route and an additional business route. All of the business routes are former sections of US Highway 131 (US 131). These former sections of the mainline highway, along with the necessary connecting roads, allow traffic to access the downtowns business districts of cities bypassed by sections of US 131 built since the 1950s. The extant business loops connect to Constantine, Three Rivers, Kalamazoo, Big Rapids, Cadillac, and Manton. The former bypass route in Grand Rapids allowed traffic to bypass that city's downtown at a time when US 131 still ran through the heart of the city, and the later business route connected through downtown while US 131 ran on a freeway bypassing the central business district.

== Constantine ==
Business US Highway 131
- Location: Constantine
- Length: 3.656 mi (5.884 km)
- Existed: October 30, 2013–present

Business US Highway 131 (Bus. US 131) is a business loop running through downtown Constantine. It starts south of the village in Constantine Township near some farm fields and runs northward. The highway passes a mobile home park and a couple of businesses before veering northwesterly on Washington Street through a residential neighborhood on the south side of Constantine. Bus. US 131 crosses the St. Joseph River and then turns northeasterly on Broad Street. The loop runs parallel to the banks of the river as the highway exits the northern side of the village. Bus. US 131 ends in Constantine Township where it intersects the northern end of the Constantine Bypass.

The Michigan Department of Transportation (MDOT) has been studying a freeway upgrade for US 131 through St. Joseph County for several years. In late 2005, MDOT decided not to pursue an upgrade of the highway, but rescinded that decision in April 2006 under political pressure in the state. The department began building a two-lane bypass west of Constantine. The American Association of State Highway and Transportation Officials, which is in charge of US Highway numbering assignments and routings, approved the relocation of the US 131 designation out of Constantine on November 16, 2012. The group's Special Committee on U.S. Route Numbering also approved the creation of a business route for the old highway through town. The bypass opened on October 30, 2013, and the business route designation was put into service that day.

Major intersections
The entire highway is in St. Joseph County.

Location	mi	km	Destinations	Notes
Constantine Township	0.000	0.000	US 131 – Three Rivers, Middlebury	
Constantine	1.770– 1.974	2.849– 3.177	Bridge over St. Joseph River	
Constantine Township	3.656	5.884	US 131 – Three Rivers, Middlebury	
1.000 mi = 1.609 km; 1.000 km = 0.621 mi

== Three Rivers ==
Business US Highway 131
- Location: Three Rivers
- Length: 2.982 mi (4.799 km)
- Existed: 1953–present

Business US Highway 131 (Bus. US 131) is a three-mile-long (4.8 km) business loop running through downtown Three Rivers. It follows M-60 (Michigan Avenue) eastward from a commercial district on the main highway into downtown. Bus. US 131/M-60 passes through a residential neighborhood and crosses the Rocky River near its confluence with the St. Joseph River. On the east side of the river, the business loop turns north-northwesterly onto Main Street, separating from M-60 at an intersection that also features M-86. Bus. US 131 (Main Street) passes several more businesses and turns due north through a residential area. Near the northern terminus, the business loop passes a handful of businesses before ending at an intersection with US 131 on the north side of town.

The Three Rivers Bypass opened in the middle of 1953, and the former route of the highway through downtown was redesignated as the business loop at that time.

Major intersections
The entire highway is in Three Rivers, St. Joseph County.

mi	km	Destinations	Notes
0.000	0.000	US 131 / M-60 west – Kalamazoo, Constantine, Cassopolis	Western end of M-60 concurrency
1.003	1.614	M-60 east – Jackson M-86 east – Coldwater	Eastern end of M-60; western terminus of M-86
2.982	4.799	US 131 – Constantine, Kalamazoo	
1.000 mi = 1.609 km; 1.000 km = 0.621 mi: Concurrency terminus

== Kalamazoo ==
Business US Highway 131
- Location: Kalamazoo
- Length: 4.198 mi (6.756 km)
- Existed: 1964–present

Business US Highway 131 (Bus. US 131) is a 4.2-mile-long (6.8 km) business spur running north of downtown Kalamazoo. North of downtown, Westnedge Avenue curves northeasterly to run next to Park Street, and the two streets form the opposing two-lane carriageways of a freeway; this transition point marks the southern end of Bus. US 131. This freeway runs north and then turns westward. There is a half folded diamond interchange for Douglas Avenue. West of that interchange, the freeway turns northwesterly, passing between suburban residential subdivisions before terminating at an interchange with US 131.

On December 7, 1959, the I-94/US 12 freeway opened on the south side of Kalamazoo, and US 12 was shifted to follow the new freeway. The former route through downtown Kalamazoo and along Stadium Drive was redesignated Bus. US 12. The next year, it was renumbered BL I-94. In 1963, the US 131 freeway opened on the northwest side of Kalamazoo. US 131 followed M-43 eastward from the end of the freeway into the downtown area to reconnect to its original routing along Westnedge and Park. The next year, another section of US 131 opened southwest of Kalamazoo, and US 131 was rerouted out of downtown completely. The freeway section north of downtown opened in 1964, and Bus. US 131 was designated along it into downtown and along BL I-94 back out to the US 131 freeway west of downtown. Later in 1965, Kalamazoo and Michikal avenues were transferred to state jurisdiction to set up the one-way pairing east–west through downtown. Kalamazoo and Michikal are then signed as southbound Bus. US 131 from Westnedge Avenue to Stadium Drive while Main Street and Michigan Avenue continued to serve northbound traffic only between Stadium Drive and Park Street.

In January 2019, the City of Kalamazoo accepted jurisdiction of the streets that formed sections of state highways within the city. In doing so, Bus. US 131 was truncated such that it only runs north of downtown on its freeway segment through Kalamazoo Township to the US 131 freeway. A project was announced in December 2023 to add ramps to the US 131 interchange to offer the missing connections. MDOT announced on February 28, 2025, that this project has begun with anticipated completion in November 2025, and it opened on November 7, 2025.

Major intersections
The entire highway is in Kalamazoo County. All exits are unnumbered.

Location	mi	km	Destinations	Notes
Kalamazoo Township	0.000	0.000	Dunkley Street	Southern terminus; roadway continues south as Westnedge Avenue (southbound) and Park Street (northbound)
Kalamazoo Township	0.671	1.080	Douglas Avenue	
Oshtemo Township	4.198	6.756	US 131 / M-43 – Grand Rapids, Three Rivers	Northern terminus; US 131 exit 41
1.000 mi = 1.609 km; 1.000 km = 0.621 mi

== Grand Rapids bypass ==
Bypass US Highway 131
- Location: Grand Rapids
- Length: 14.253 mi (22.938 km)
- Existed: 1945–1953

Bypass US Highway 131 (Byp. US 131) was a bypass route around downtown Grand Rapids. The highway followed 28th Street eastward from the intersection with US 131 (Division Street) south of downtown. From this starting point eastward, it ran concurrently with Byp. US 16 and Byp M-21. M-37 also followed 28th Street at the time eastward from the intersection at Kalamazoo Avenue. At the intersection with East Beltline and Broadmoor avenues in Paris Township (now Kentwood), Byp.US 16/Byp. US 131/Byp.M-21 turned northward to follow East Beltline, and M-37 turned southward on Broadmoor. The bypass route continued northward through Grand Rapids Township. At the intersection with US 16/M-50 (Cascade Road), Byp. US 16 ended, and Byp. M-21 ended less than half a mile (0.4 km) north of that at the intersection with M-21 (Fulton Street). North of the intersection with Fulton Street, Byp. US 131 was the only designation along East Beltline Avenue at the time. The highway ran northward into Plainfield Township, and it terminated at an intersection with US 131 at Plainfield Avenue and Northland Drive just south of the Grand River.

By 1945, Byp. US 131, along with the other various bypass routes, was designated along the Grand Rapids beltline system, replacing M-114. Byp. US 131 followed the south beltline (28th Street) and East Beltline Avenue between Division Avenue and Plainfield Avenue, allowing north–south traffic to bypass downtown Grand Rapids. In late 1949, M-37 was rerouted onto 28th Street between Kalamazoo and East Beltline/Broadmoor avenues. Then in 1953, US 131 was rerouted onto the beltlines to replace its bypass route; the former mainline through downtown was redesignated Bus. US 131.

Major intersections
The entire highway was in Kent County.

Location	mi	km	Destinations	Notes
Grand Rapids	0.000	0.000	US 131 (Division Street) – Cadillac, Kalamazoo Byp. US 16 west / Byp. M-21 west (28th Street) – Muskegon, Holland	Western end of Byp. US 16/Byp. M-21 concurrency
Paris Township	1.924	3.096	M-37 north (Kalamazoo Avenue) – Grand Rapids	Western end of M-37 concurrency
Paris Township	4.188	6.740	M-37 south (Broadmoor Avenue) – Hastings	Eastern end of M-37 concurrency
Grand Rapids Township	7.277	11.711	US 16 / M-50 (Cascade Road) – Grand Rapids, Lansing Byp. US 16 west	Northern end of Byp. US 16 concurrency
Grand Rapids Township	7.710	12.408	M-21 (Fulton Street) – Grand Rapids, Flint Byp. M-21 west	Northern end of Byp. M-21 concurrency
Plainfield Township	14.253	22.938	US 131 (Plainfield Avenue/Northland Drive) – Cadillac, Grand Rapids	
1.000 mi = 1.609 km; 1.000 km = 0.621 mi: Concurrency terminus

== Grand Rapids business loop ==
Business US Highway 131
- Location: Grand Rapids
- Length: 2.419 mi (3.893 km)
- Existed: 1953–December 2017

Business US Highway 131 (BUS US 131) was a 2.4-mile-long (3.9 km) business loop running through downtown Grand Rapids. The southern end was at a partial interchange with US 131 south of the S-Curve near the Grand River. Only northbound traffic on US 131 could directly access the business loop at this interchange, running northward on a long ramp that connects to Ottawa Avenue at an intersection with Cherry Street. Bus. US 131 followed Ottawa Avenue northward between parking lots, and after one block, it turned eastward onto Oakes Street immediately south of the Van Andel Arena. The business loop traveled three blocks along Oakes Street past commercial properties before turning northward onto Division Street. As the highway ran along Division Street, it passed the various businesses, the campuses of Kendall College of Art and Design and Grand Rapids Community College. It also passed under Michigan Avenue at the base of the hill that makes up the Medical Mile. Immediately north of the Michigan Avenue overpass, Bus. US 131 passed under Interstate 196 (I-196) without an interchange. Division Street here runs at the base of Belknap Hill through an area of the city dominated by industrial-type properties. North of an intersection with Coldbrook Street, the business loop switched to Plainfield Avenue and turned northeasterly. One block later, Bus. US 131 turned westward onto Leonard Street. The business loop followed Leonard for a few blocks and then crossed the Grand River. On the western bank of the river, Bus. US 131 met its parent highway at exit 87 and terminated. The streets that carried the business loop have either two or four lanes with an additional center turn lane.

The designation was created when US 131 was rerouted on the Grand Rapids beltline system in 1953. Previously, a Bypass US 131 (Byp. US 131) designation was used on the beltline system following 28th Street and East Beltline Avenue. After the change, the former mainline through downtown on Division Street and Plainfield Avenue was redesignated Bus. US 131, and the mainline US 131 replaced Byp. US 131. In 1961, the US 131 freeway was extended northward to the west of downtown, and between 28th Street and the downtown exit, it was initially designated as part of Bus. US 131. In December 1962, the I-296/US 131 freeway was completed west of downtown. Afterwards, Bus. US 131 was truncated on its southern end to the modern exit 84B interchange on the south side of downtown. At the same time, the northern end was also truncated, using Coldbrook Street and Monroe Avenue to Leonard Street to connect back to the freeway.

In 1986, the city and state transferred jurisdiction over some streets at the northern end of the business loop, smoothing out the routing of the northern end of Bus. US 131 and eliminating some extra turns between Plainfield Avenue and Leonard Street. The construction of the Van Andel Arena in 1995 and 1996 severed the connection from southbound Bus. US 131 to US 131. This gap was rejoined with the reconstruction of the "S-Curve" in 1999. In August 2017, the city and MDOT announced that jurisdiction of the business loop was being transferred to city control, decommissioning the trunkline in the process. Jurisdiction was transferred in December, and the American Association of State Highway and Transportation Officials approved the removal of the designation in May 2018.

Major intersections
The entire highway was in Grand Rapids, Kent County.

mi	km	Destinations	Notes
0.000	0.000	US 131 – Cadillac, Kalamazoo	Exit 84B on US 131
2.419	3.893	US 131 (I-296) – Cadillac, Kalamazoo	Exit 87 on US 131
1.000 mi = 1.609 km; 1.000 km = 0.621 mi

== Big Rapids ==
Business US Highway 131
- Location: Big Rapids
- Length: 6.860 mi (11.040 km)
- Existed: 1983–present

Business US Highway 131 (Bus. US 131) is a 6.9-mile-long (11.1 km) business loop running through downtown Big Rapids. The southern end of the highway is at an interchange with US 131 and M-20 west of downtown in Big Rapids Township. At this interchange, M-20 leaves the freeway to run concurrently eastward with the business loop along the four-lane Perry Street into town. Bus. US 131/M-20 passes several commercial properties on the western edge of Big Rapids before crossing the city limits. South of Perry Street in the city is part of the campus of Ferris State University, including Katke Golf Course; the north side of the street contains various businesses. At the intersection with State Street, Bus. US 131/M-20 turns northward toward downtown Big Rapids, passing the northern end of the FSU campus. North of campus, the business loop passes through residential neighborhoods. At the intersection with Maple Street immediately west of downtown, M-20 turns easterly and separates from Bus. US 131. North of the downtown area, State Street ends, and the business loop follows Northland Drive parallel to the Muskegon River. On the northern edge of the city, the highway passes Roben–Hood Airport before exiting town as a two-lane road. Running in a rural area in Big Rapids Township, the business loop turns westward onto 19 Mile Road. Bus. US 131 ends at an interchange with US 131 and County Road B-96.

In 1983 with the extension of the US 131 freeway west of Big Rapids to the interchange with 19 Mile Road, the former route of US 131 through Big Rapids on State Street and Northland Drive north of Perry Street was designated as a business loop, using M-20 (Perry Street) to connect back to the freeway on the southern end. At the time, 19 Mile Road between the freeway Northland Drive was used by the mainline to connect to its pre-existing routing north of Big Rapids to Reed City. The US 131 freeway was completed north of 19 Mile Road in 1986, and Bus. US 131 was extended over the 19 Mile Road portion of US 131 to connect with its parent route at exit 142 northwest of Big Rapids.

Major intersections
The entire highway is in Mecosta County.

Location	mi	km	Destinations	Notes
Big Rapids Township	0.000	0.000	US 131 / M-20 west – Cadillac, Grand Rapids, White Cloud	Western end of M-20 concurrency; exit 139 on US 131
Big Rapids	2.814	4.529	M-20 east (Maple Street) – Mount Pleasant	Northern end of M-20 concurrency
Big Rapids Township	6.860	11.040	US 131 – Cadillac, Grand Rapids B-96 west (19 Mile Road)	Exit 142 on US 131; eastern terminus of B-96; roadway continues as B-96
1.000 mi = 1.609 km; 1.000 km = 0.621 mi: Concurrency terminus

== Cadillac ==
Business US Highway 131
- Location: Cadillac
- Length: 5.597 mi (9.007 km)
- Existed: 2001–present

Business US Highway 131 (Bus. US 131) is a 5.60-mile-long (9.01 km) business loop running through downtown Cadillac. The southern end is at an interchange with US 131/M-55 in Clam Lake Township south of Cadillac, and the business loop runs northward along Mitchell Street away from the freeway, passing several businesses and the Maple Hill Cemetery. North of the cemetery, Mitchell Street descends a hill through a residential neighborhood south of downtown. At Howard Street, the business loop turns northwesterly into downtown near Lake Cadillac. North of downtown, Mitchell Street turns more northerly and passes the Wexford County Civic Center. At the intersection with Boon Road next to the Wexford County Airport, Bus. US 131 turns eastward onto Boon Road to connect back to the freeway in Haring Township. The business loop has at least four lanes, two in each direction, and some segments also feature a center turn lane.

The Michigan Department of Transportation (MDOT) started construction of a freeway bypass of Cadillac in 1999. With the completion of the southern half of the bypass in 2000, M-55 was rerouted out of town along the new freeway. Once the northern half of the bypass was completed on October 30, 2001, US 131 was rerouted out of town along the new highway to the end of the freeway where it joined the old alignment north of town. Mitchell Street through downtown Cadillac was redesignated as Bus. US 131.

Major intersections
The entire highway is in Wexford County.

Location	mi	km	Destinations	Notes
Clam Lake Township	0.000	0.000	US 131 / M-55 – Petoskey, Grand Rapids, Manistee, Lake City	Exit 177 on US 131
Haring Township	5.597	9.007	US 131 – Petoskey, Grand Rapids	Exit 183 on US 131
1.000 mi = 1.609 km; 1.000 km = 0.621 mi

== Manton ==
Business US Highway 131
- Location: Manton, Michigan
- Length: 5.667 mi (9.120 km)
- Existed: 2003–present

Business US Highway 131 (Bus. US 131) is a 5 2/3-mile-long (9.1 km) business loop running through downtown Manton. The business loop starts at an interchange with US 131 and M-42 east of downtown Manton in Cedar Creek Township. Bus. US 131 runs concurrently with M-42 for about a mile (1.6 km) westerly into town along a roadway with a travel lane in each direction separated by a center turn lane. At the intersection with Michigan Avenue (Old US 131), M-42 terminates and Bus. US 131 turns northward onto Michigan Avenue. The business loop runs through downtown Manton before exiting the northern end of town. North of Manton, the turn lane is eliminated, and the surrounding landscapes are dominated by farm fields broken by intermittent patches of forest. Bus. US 131 curves northwesterly before returning to a due northward course. As the business loop approaches northern end of the freeway mainline in Liberty Township, it curves northeasterly to meet it at an at-grade intersection.

With the completion of the Manton Bypass in 2003, US 131 was rerouted out of downtown Manton. The former route through town was designated Bus. US 131, using M-42 to connect back to the freeway east of town.

Major intersections
The entire highway is in Wexford County.

Location	mi	km	Destinations	Notes
Cedar Creek Township	0.000	0.000	US 131 – Cadillac, Petoskey M-42 east – Lake City	Eastern end of M-42 concurrency; exit 191 on US 131
Manton	0.976	1.571	M-42 east – Lake City	Western end of M-42 concurrency at western terminus of M-42
Liberty Township	5.667	9.120	US 131 – Cadillac, Petoskey	
1.000 mi = 1.609 km; 1.000 km = 0.621 mi: Concurrency terminus
