= M-179 (Michigan highway) =

State highway in Allegan and Barry counties in Michigan, United States

M-179
- M-179 highlighted in red

Route information
- Maintained by MDOT
- Length: 16.963 mi (27.299 km)
- Existed: 1998–present
- Tourist routes: Chief Nooday Trail Recreational Heritage Route

Major junctions
- West end: US 131 near Bradley
- A-45 in Bradley
- East end: M-43 near Hastings

Location
- Country: United States
- State: Michigan
- Counties: Allegan, Barry

Highway system
- Michigan State Trunkline Highway System; Interstate; US; State; Byways
← M-178	→ M-183

M-179 is a 16.963-mile-long (27.299 km) state trunkline highway in the western portion of the US state of Michigan. It runs from US Highway 131 (US 131) at exit 61 outside of Bradley to M-43 just west of Hastings in the Lower Peninsula. The highway crosses through forest land and provides access to state recreational areas. M-179 has been given the Chief Noonday Recreational Heritage Route designation by the Michigan Department of Transportation (MDOT). Prior to October 1998, this highway was the eastern portion of county road A-42. The number was formally assigned by the next year. This is not the first time the number was used in Michigan, an unrelated M-179 previously existed in the 1930s through the 1950s farther north.

== Route description ==
M-179 begins at an interchange with US 131 just west of Bradley. From there, the road travels to the east past the Gun Lake Casino and through the community before bending around the southern edge of Sager Lake. After passing the lake, the highway resumes its easterly course and continues through the rural forest areas of eastern Allegan County, where the road is known as 129th Avenue. M-179 crosses the county line and heads into Barry County north of Gun Lake. The road is then locally known as Chief Noonday Road. Here it continues its eastward trek until it winds its way through the Yankee Springs State Recreation Area. After passing through the recreation area, the road continues to the east passing through wooded area before a slight curve to the north, after which it continues to the east and terminates at a junction with M-43 just west of Hastings.

The Michigan Department of Transportation (MDOT) maintains the roadway as a part of the state highway system. As a part of this role, the department tracks the average annual daily traffic on its roadways, a calculation of the number of vehicles to use a highway segment on any average day of the year. In 2009, MDOT determined that 5,622 vehicles in Allegan County and 4,253 vehicles in Barry County used M-179 daily. For the whole length of the highway, the commercial traffic was calculated to be 246 trucks daily in 2009. No section of the highway has been listed on the National Highway System, a system of roads important to the nation's economy, defense, and mobility. M-179 has been named the Chief Noonday Trail Recreational Heritage Route (now a Pure Michigan Byway) by MDOT for its "natural beauty" and access to recreational areas.

== History ==
The original version of M-179 was established in 1935 as a shortcut near Le Roy between US 131 and what was M-63. That route was turned back to local control in late 1958 or 1959, and the designation disappeared from the system. (The original M-63 itself was decommissioned a few years later in 1961.) On October 1, 1998, as part of the Rationalization process, a jurisdictional transfer turned county road A-42 between US 131 and M-43 over to the state, which the state later designated as M-179 for the following year.

== Major intersections ==
County	Location	mi	km	Destinations	Notes
Allegan	Wayland Township	0.000	0.000	US 131 – Grand Rapids, Kalamazoo A-42 west – Hopkins	Exit 61 on US 131; roadway continues west as A-42
Allegan	Bradley	1.541	2.480	A-45 – Grand Rapids, Kalamazoo	Old US 131
Barry	Rutland Township	16.963	27.299	M-43 – Hastings, Kalamazoo	Eastern terminus just west of a junction with M-37
1.000 mi = 1.609 km; 1.000 km = 0.621 mi
