= M-343 (Michigan highway) =

State highway in Kalamazoo County, Michigan, United States

M-343
- M-343 highlighted in red

Route information
- Maintained by MDOT
- Length: 7.928 mi (12.759 km)
- Existed: January 7, 2019–present

Major junctions
- West end: Riverview Drive in Kalamazoo
- East end: M-89 in Richland

Location
- Country: United States
- State: Michigan
- Counties: Kalamazoo

Highway system
- Michigan State Trunkline Highway System; Interstate; US; State; Byways
← M-331	→ I-375

M-343 is a state trunkline highway in Kalamazoo County, Michigan. It runs for almost eight miles (13 km) along Gull Road between the northeast side of Kalamazoo and continues through rural areas on the way to Richland. The highway was created in January 2019 from a section of M-43 after that highway was rerouted in the aftermath of a series of jurisdictional transfers in downtown Kalamazoo. It had been a part of the state highway system for a century under its previous number until it was given its current designation.

== Route description ==
M-343 starts where Gull Road intersects Riverview Drive east of the Kalamazoo River in Kalamazoo. From there, the highway follows Gull Road northeasterly past Riverside Cemetery and Borgess Medical Center on the northeast side of Kalamazoo. M-343 passes a number of commercial properties as it exits Kalamazoo and enters farmland. As the highway approaches Richland, there are additional businesses flanking the roadway. M-343 then turns due east along D Avenue for a short distance before terminating at an intersection with M-89 in the middle of Richland.

The section of M-343 between Sprinkle Road in Comstock Township and the highway's western terminus at Riverview Drive was listed on the National Highway System (NHS) when the highway was part of M-43.

== History ==
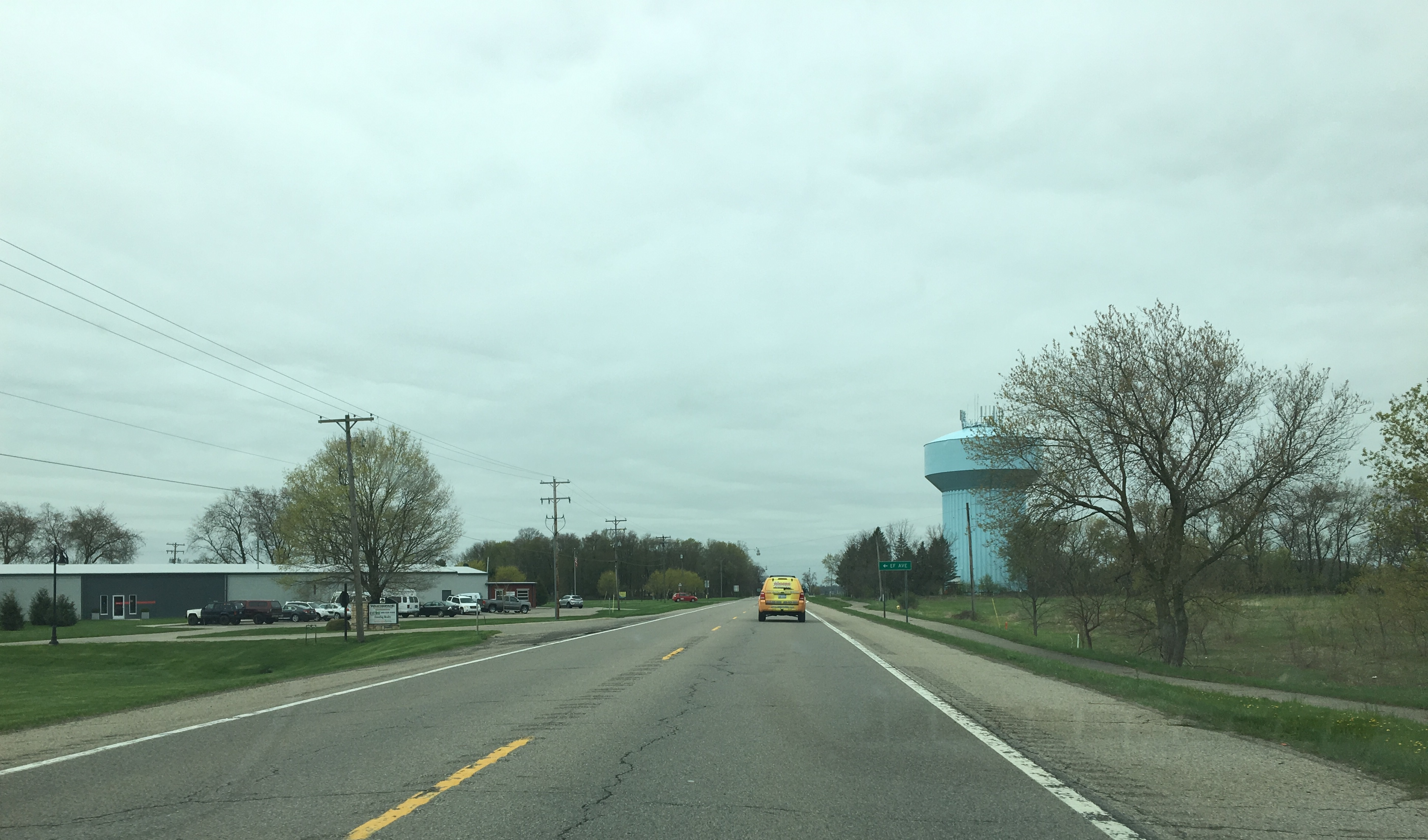
M-343 in Richland, May 2019

Passage of the State Reward Trunk Line Highways Act on May 13, 1913, provided for 3,000 miles (4,828 km) of roadways in a state-financed system. No division of the original system included Gull Road between Kalamazoo and Richland, but it was included as a state reward road by the following year. In 1919, the state highway system was signposted for the first time, and Gull Road was first signed as a state highway that year as a part of M-43. The section closest to Kalamazoo was paved, while the remainder was a gravel roadway. By September 1924, it was shown as fully paved on state maps.

In 2018, planners with the City of Kalamazoo negotiated with MDOT a transfer of the jurisdiction of several streets in the city's downtown. The goal was to give the city greater control, allowing Kalamazoo to convert one-way streets to two-way traffic, lower traffic speeds and giving the city flexibility on permitting and parking. On January 7, 2019, the City of Kalamazoo accepted jurisdiction over those streets from MDOT, ending their status as state trunklines. As a result, MDOT rerouted M-43 out of downtown Kalamazoo, running along US Highway 131 west of Kalamazoo north to Plainwell and then southeasterly along M-89 back to its previous alignment at Richland. The segment of highway retained by the state along Gull Road was renumbered M-343 afterwards. The number was given an odd initial digit to signify that the highway is a spur of M-43; M-143 was taken by a highway in East Lansing. Signage reflecting the change was erected in August 2019.

== Major intersections ==
The entire highway is in Kalamazoo County.

Location	mi	km	Destinations	Notes
Kalamazoo	0.000	0.000	Riverview Drive	
Richland	7.928	12.759	M-89 to M-43 – Plainwell, Battle Creek	
1.000 mi = 1.609 km; 1.000 km = 0.621 mi
