= Cedar Creek Township, Wexford County, Michigan =

Cedar Creek Township, Michigan
- Civil township
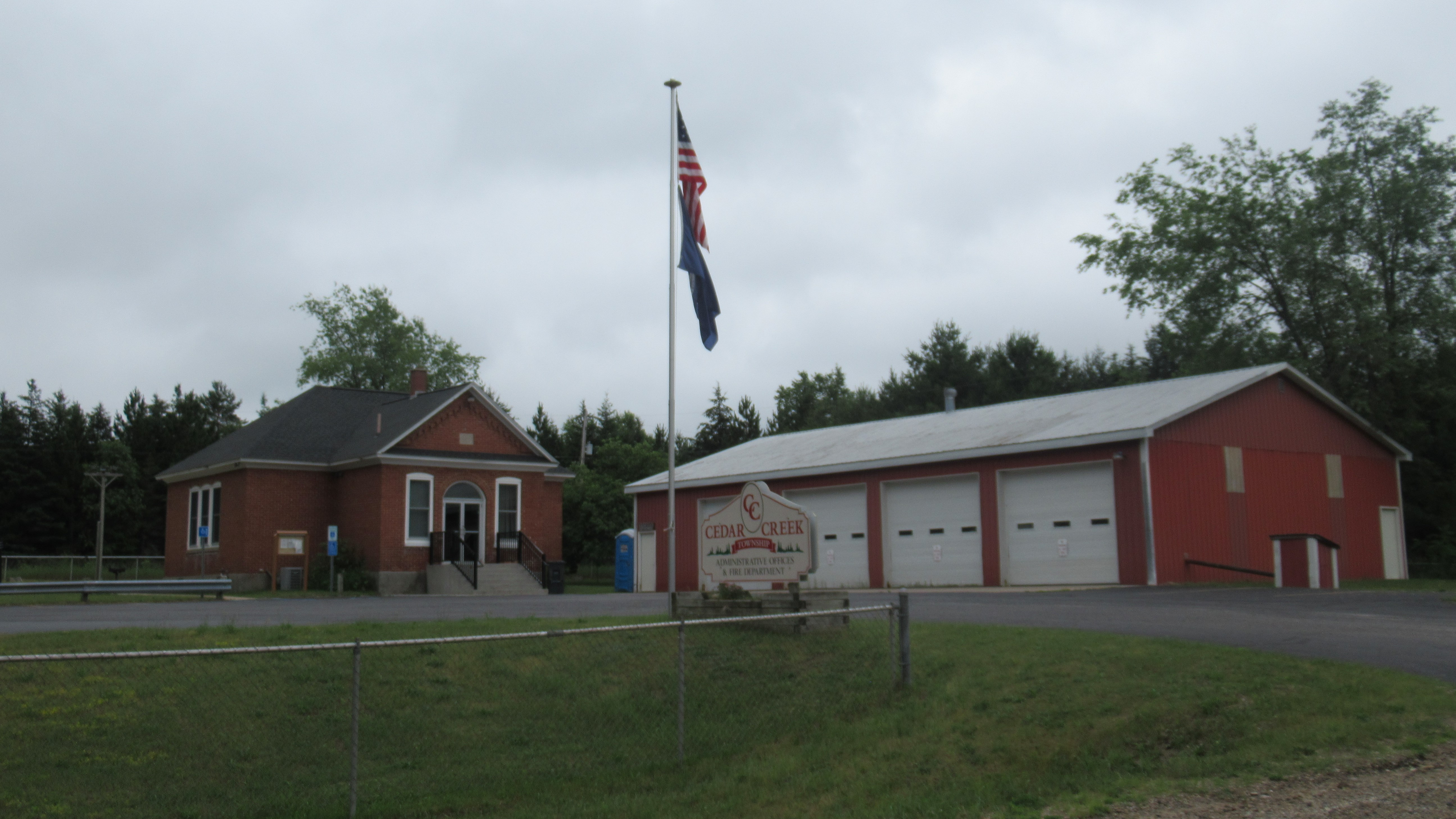
- Cedar Creek Township Hall and Fire Department

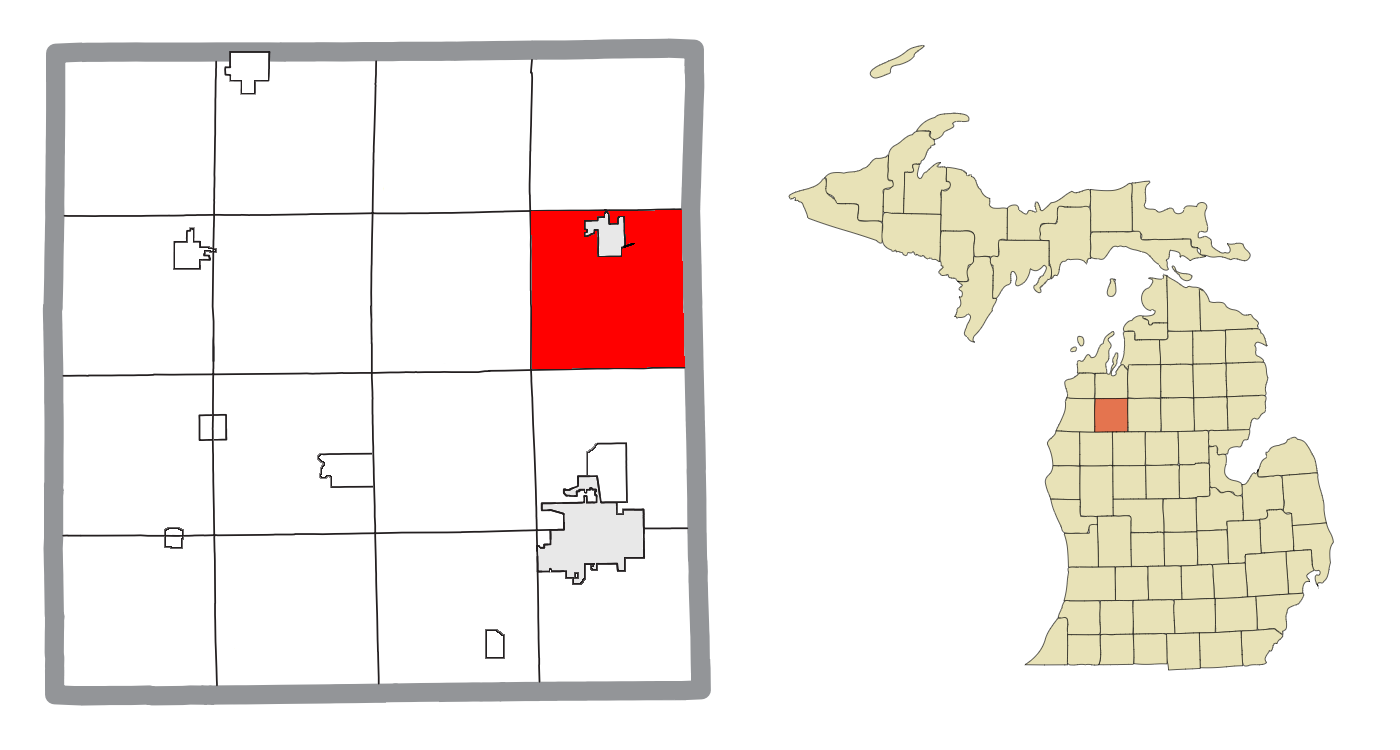
- Location within Wexford County

- Location within the state of Michigan Location within the United States
- Coordinates: 44°22′42″N 85°24′10″W
- Country: United States
- State: Michigan
- County: Wexford

Government
  - Supervisor: Justin Paquette
  - Clerk: Elizabeth Edwards

Area
  - Total: 34.14 sq mi (88.42 km^{2})
  - Land: 34.12 sq mi (88.37 km^{2})
  - Water: 0.019 sq mi (0.05 km^{2})
- Elevation: 1,283 ft (391 m)

Population (2020)
  - Total: 1,855
  - Density: 54.37/sq mi (20.99/km^{2})
- Time zone: UTC-5 (Eastern (EST))
  - Summer (DST): UTC-4 (EDT)
- ZIP code(s): 49601 (Cadillac); 49663 (Manton)
- Area code: 231
- FIPS code: 26-14120
- GNIS feature ID: 1626048

Cedar Creek Township is a civil township of Wexford County in the U.S. state of Michigan. The population was 1,855 at the 2020 census.

== Communities ==
- Gilbert is an unincorporated community located within the township at 44°22′30″N 85°25′05″W. The community was a lumber settlement with a train station along the Grand Rapids and Indiana Railroad. A post office opened on November 1, 1883 but is no longer in operation.
- The township surrounds the city of Manton. However, the two are administratively autonomous.

== Geography ==
According to the U.S. Census Bureau, the township has a total area of 34.14 square miles (88.42 km^{2}), of which 34.12 square miles (88.37 km^{2}) is land and 0.02 square miles (0.05 km^{2}) (0.05%) is water.

The city of Manton is surrounded by the township in the northern section, but the city and township are administered autonomously after Manton incorporated as a city in 1923.

=== Major highways ===
- US 131 runs south–north through the center of the township.
- Bus. US 131 runs very briefly through the township from U.S. Route 131 west to the city of Manton.
- M-42 runs briefly east–west and has its western terminus at U.S. Route 131 within the township. The roadway continues westward as Business US Highway 131.

== Demographics ==
As of the census of 2000, there were 1,489 people, 504 households, and 416 families residing in the township. The population density was 43.6 inhabitants per square mile (16.8/km^{2}). There were 611 housing units at an average density of 17.9 per square mile (6.9/km^{2}). The racial makeup of the township was 97.25% White, 0.40% African American, 0.67% Native American, 0.40% Asian, 0.20% from other races, and 1.07% from two or more races. Hispanic or Latino of any race were 1.21% of the population.

There were 504 households, out of which 41.7% had children under the age of 18 living with them, 68.1% were married couples living together, 9.9% had a female householder with no husband present, and 17.3% were non-families. 13.7% of all households were made up of individuals, and 5.0% had someone living alone who was 65 years of age or older. The average household size was 2.95 and the average family size was 3.23.

In the township the population was spread out, with 31.8% under the age of 18, 7.2% from 18 to 24, 29.8% from 25 to 44, 22.2% from 45 to 64, and 9.0% who were 65 years of age or older. The median age was 35 years. For every 100 females, there were 105.7 males. For every 100 females age 18 and over, there were 99.8 males.

The median income for a household in the township was $37,566, and the median income for a family was $40,313. Males had a median income of $31,435 versus $21,711 for females. The per capita income for the township was $15,645. About 9.0% of families and 10.9% of the population were below the poverty line, including 11.9% of those under age 18 and 2.4% of those age 65 or over.

== Education ==
Cedar Creek Township is served entirely by Manton Consolidated Schools, which is centered within the city of Manton.
