= Liberty Township, Michigan =

Liberty Township is the name of some places in the U.S. state of Michigan:

- Liberty Township, Jackson County, Michigan
- Liberty Township, Wexford County, Michigan

== See also ==
- Liberty Township (disambiguation)
