= WBR =

WBR may refer to:

- Warner Bros. Records, an American record label
- WBR Sessions, an EP recorded by Guster
- The Welsh Boat Race, an annual rowing race River Tawe or River Taff in South Wales also known as the Welsh University Boat Race and The Welsh Varsity Boat Race
- World Bicycle Relief, USA based charity organization
- Willie Revillame, a Filipino musician, businessman, and TV Host
- WBR, the IATA airport code for Roben-Hood Airport in Michigan, United States
- WBR, the National Rail station code for Whaley Bridge railway station, in Derbyshire, England
- <wbr>, a HTML tag for an optional word break
- Wood Brothers Racing, a NASCAR team
- WBR stands for the Białobrzegi County on Polish license plates
- WBR, With Best Regards.
- WBR, a former WB 100+ station, located in Rockford, Illinois
