= M-43 (Michigan highway) =

State highway in Michigan, United States

M-43
- M-43 highlighted in red

Route information
- Maintained by MDOT
- Length: 144.835 mi (233.089 km)
- Existed: 1919–present

Major junctions
- West end: BL I-196 in South Haven
- M-40 near Gobles; US 131 near Kalamazoo; M-89 from Plainwell to Richland; M-37 in Hastings; M-50 / M-66 near Woodland; I-96 / I-69 near Lansing; US 127 near East Lansing
- East end: I-96 near Webberville

Location
- Country: United States
- State: Michigan
- Counties: Van Buren, Kalamazoo, Allegan, Barry, Eaton, Ingham

Highway system
- Michigan State Trunkline Highway System; Interstate; US; State; Byways
← M-42	→ M-44

M-43 is a state trunkline highway in the southwestern and central parts of the US state of Michigan. The highway runs from South Haven to Webberville along an indirect path through both rural areas and larger cities. The trunkline follows five overall segments: a southeasterly track from South Haven to Oshtemo Township (just west of Kalamazoo), a northerly path to Plainwell, a southeasterly route to Richland, a northeasterly course to the Hastings area and an easterly route through the Lansing area.

The M-43 designation dates back to at least July 1, 1919, when it was used on a series of roadways running between Kalamazoo and St. Charles. Its northern- and easternmost sections were transferred to other highways in the 1930s. Additions to M-43 extended it to its current termini. Several sections of the highway were realigned during its history, one of these changes led to the creation of a business loop in Grand Ledge. Another former segment of the trunkline in the Lansing area has been renumbered M-143. In January 2019, the highway was rerouted north to bypass downtown Kalamazoo, where it had historically formed a high traffic trunkline through the city. The former segment between Kalamazoo and Richland was renumbered M-343.

== Route description ==
M-43 begins at an intersection with BL I-196 in South Haven. Known locally as Bailey Avenue, the road heads out of the city to the southeast, intersecting County Road A-2 before running over Interstate 196 (I-196). From there, the road continues to the southeast near the airport through the rural areas of Van Buren County. The road runs through mixed woodland and fields before passing through Bangor. After Bangor, the route heads due east past Glendale and then intersects M-40 north of Paw Paw.

After the junction with M-40, the highway then enters Kalamazoo County and has an interchange with US Highway 131 (US 131). At that interchange, M-43 turns northward running concurrently along the freeway. US 131/M-43 intersects the northern end of Business US 131 (Bus. US 131) at a partial interchange; southbound freeway traffic can exit to the business route, and traffic from Bus. US 131 can only enter northbound US 131/M-43. Further north, the freeway enters Allegan County, and at Plainwell, M-43 departs US 131 to follow M-89 southeasterly. The two highways briefly cross through Barry County before crossing back into Kalamazoo County. M-43 and M-89 separate about a mile (1.6 km) north of Richland. M-89 continues southward into town, and M-43 turns northward.

After the concurrency ends, M-43 turns east and then back north to run between Little Long and Gull lakes. It is at this point where M-43 begins its northward trek. The road continues on a general north-northeast track through rural areas and beside several lakes in Barry County before meeting M-179 and M-37. M-43 merges with the latter highway and together they run into Hastings. Downtown, M-37 leaves town to the south, while M-43 heads north before curving around the east, passing through farm fields approaching the community of Woodland. After leaving town, the road meets M-66, and together they head north to a junction with M-50.

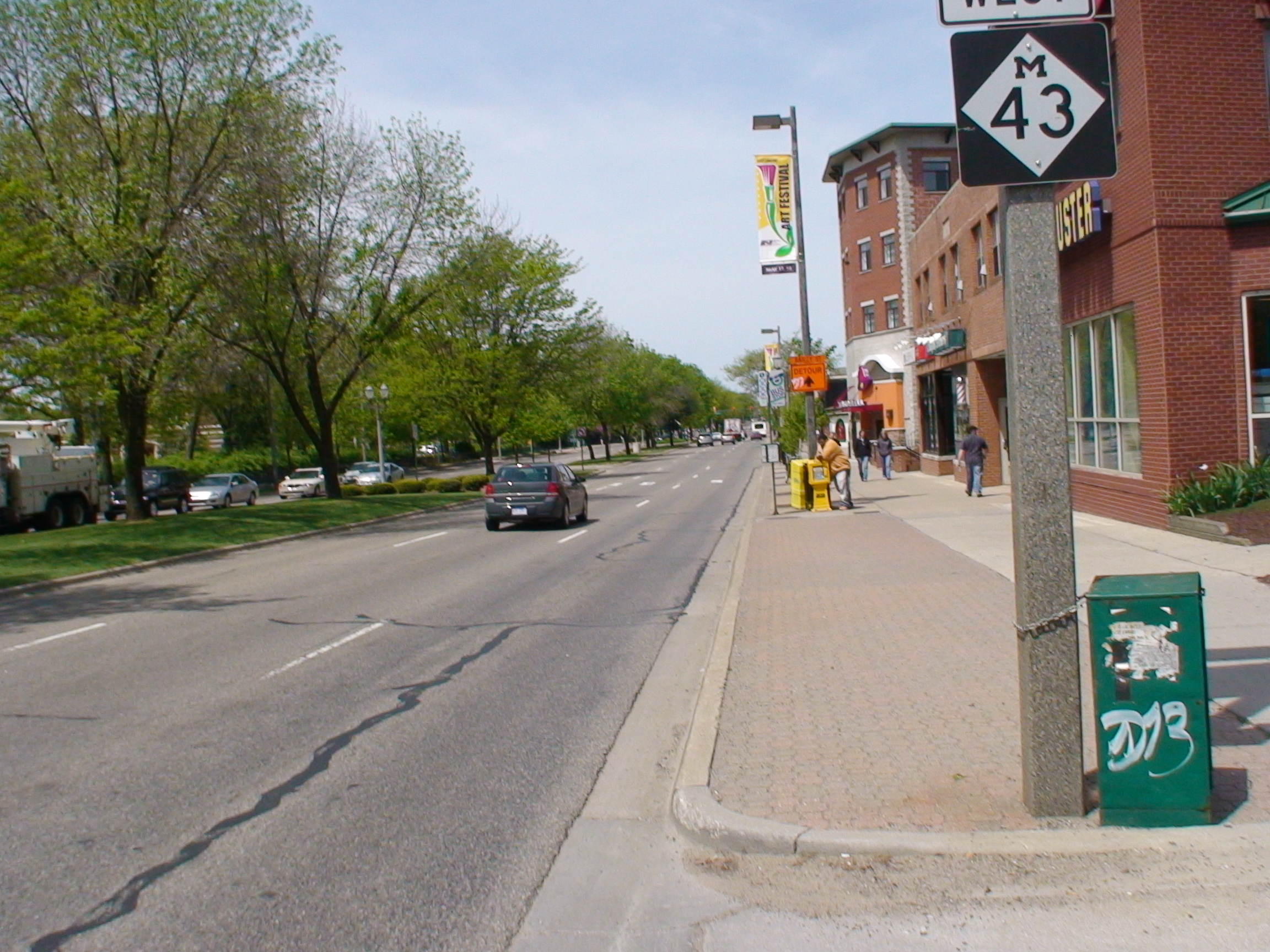
M-43 running along Grand River Avenue at Collingwood Drive in East Lansing

M-43 then turns east with M-50, and they briefly run together before M-50 diverges to the southeast. Now known as the Grand Ledge Highway, M-43 continues its easterly path across northern Eaton County before dipping south briefly to travel around the south side of Grand Ledge. Just south of town, M-43 has a junction with M-100 and then follows Saginaw Highway. The highway then has a junction with I-96/I-69 in Delta Township before continuing into Lansing, merged with BL I-69.

In Lansing, the highway travels splits to follow the one-way streets of Saginaw (eastbound) and Oakland (westbound) near the Sparrow Specialty Hospital. BL I-69/M-43 then crosses the Grand River and passes Marshall Park. The trunkline then passes over US 127 just before the paired one-way streets merge back together on Grand River Avenue. After the merge, M-43 heads southeast through East Lansing, passing the main campus of Michigan State University and Spartan Stadium. The road continues on its southeast path, traveling by the Meridian Mall as it enters Meridian Township. From here the road travels through Williamston before terminating at an interchange with I-96 just south of Webberville at exit 122.

The Michigan Department of Transportation (MDOT) maintains M-43 like all other state trunkline highways. As a part of those responsibilities, the department tracks the volume of traffic along its roadways using a metric called average annual daily traffic. This is a calculation of the traffic levels for a roadway segment for any average day of the year. In 2009, MDOT determined that the highest traffic volume along M-43 was east of the I-96/I-69 interchange at 38,927 vehicles per day. The highest commercial traffic was west of the interchange at 645 trucks daily. The lowest volumes were at Woodland with only 1,700 vehicles and 120 trucks traveling along that section of the highway daily. Two segments of M-43 are listed on the National Highway System, a network of highways that are considered important to the country's economy, defense, and mobility. The first is between Oshtemo Township and Plainwell, where M-43 runs concurrently with US 131. The second is between I-96/I-69 in Delta Township and the junction between Saginaw Street and Grand River Avenue in East Lansing.

== History ==
When M-43 was first commissioned by July 1, 1919, it ran from M-17 in Kalamazoo to Hastings. It also extended north to Ionia and Stanton before turning east through Ithaca to St. Charles. In 1929, the western end was extended from Kalamazoo to South Haven, with a section still under construction. By the end of 1930, the sections of M-43 north and east of Woodbury were redesignated as parts of other highways. The Woodbury–Stanton segment was renumbered M-14, and the Stanton–St. Charles highway became M-57. In 1938, the road was extended to the east, replacing the routing of M-39 from Woodbury all the way to East Lansing where it intersected US 16 as it existed on Grand River Avenue.

The next year, M-37 was realigned, which created a concurrency with M-43 in the Hasting area. When M-43 was rerouted in 1954, the new course of the highway ran concurrently with M-66 for a few miles in rural northeastern Barry County. All of the highway was completely paved in 1956 when a new routing opened northeast of Hastings, bypassing Coats Grove. The fourth change in the Barry County routing was made by the next year; the highway was rerouted due northward out of Hastings along Broadway Street.

Around 1959, M-43 was shifted to bypass Grand Ledge. The former route through town was retained as a state highway, designated Bus. M-43. M-43 was extended from its eastern end in Lansing in 1962 along a section of highway that was formerly part of US 16 on Grand River Avenue; the extension to Webberville was made when the I-96 freeway opened that year. Through the Lansing area, M-43 was rerouted off Michigan Avenue downtown. This former routing was renumbered M-143.

The City of Kalamazoo accepted jurisdiction of the trunklines within the city's downtown from MDOT in January 2019; M-43 was rerouted out of the city as a result, following US 131 north from Oshtemo Township to Plainwell and M-89 from Plainwell southeasterly to Richland Township. The overlap with M-89 through Richland was removed, and the section of M-43 between Kalamazoo and Richland that remained in state control was renumbered M-343. Signage reflecting these changes was erected in August 2019.

== Major intersections ==
County	Location	mi	km	Exit	Destinations	Notes
Van Buren	South Haven	0.000	0.000		BL I-196 / LMCT	
Van Buren	South Haven Township	0.775– 0.786	1.247– 1.265		A-2 (Blue Star Memorial Highway)	
Van Buren	Waverly–Almena township line	22.555	36.299		M-40 – Paw Paw, Holland	
Kalamazoo	Oshtemo Township	33.667– 33.688	54.182– 54.216	38	US 131 south – Three Rivers	Southern end of US 131 concurrency
Kalamazoo	Oshtemo Township	36.002	57.940	41	Bus. US 131 south – Downtown Kalamazoo	Northern terminus of Bus. US 131
Kalamazoo	Alamo Township	39.302	63.250	44	D Avenue	
Allegan	Plainwell	44.386	71.432	49	US 131 north – Grand Rapids M-89 west – Plainwell, Otsego, Allegan	Northern end of US 131 concurrency; western end of M-89 concurrency; signed as exits 49A (east) and 49B (west); Allegan signed northbound only, Otsego signed southbound only
Allegan	Plainwell	45.239	72.805		A-45 – Kalamazoo, Grand Rapids	Former routing of US 131
Barry	No major junctions					
Kalamazoo	Richland Township	56.086	90.262		M-89 east to M-343 west – Richland	Eastern end of M-89 concurrency
Barry	Rutland Township	77.181– 77.245	124.211– 124.314		M-179 west – Bradley	Eastern terminus of M-179
Barry	Rutland Township	69.396	111.682		M-37 north – Grand Rapids	Western terminus of M-37 concurrency
Barry	Hastings	79.802	128.429		M-37 south – Battle Creek	Eastern end of M-37 concurrency
Barry	Woodland Township	95.784	154.149		M-66 south – Battle Creek	Western end of M-66 concurrency
Barry–Eaton county line	Woodland–Sunfield township line	98.191	158.023		M-66 north – Ionia M-50 west – Grand Rapids	Eastern end of M-66 concurrency; western end of M-50 concurrency
Eaton	Sunfield Township	99.49	160.11		M-50 east – Charlotte	Eastern end of M-50 concurrency
Eaton	Grand Ledge	115.644	186.111		M-100 – Grand Ledge, Potterville	
Eaton	Delta Township	119.273– 119.289	191.951– 191.977		I-96 / I-69 – Grand Rapids, Detroit, Flint, Fort Wayne BL I-69 east	Western end of BL I-69 concurrency; exit 94 on I-96/I-69
Ingham	Lansing	125.481– 125.576	201.942– 202.095		BL I-96 (Cedar Street / Larch Street)	Intersections with Cedar (eastbound) and Larch (westbound) streets
Ingham	Lansing	127.317– 127.335	204.897– 204.926		US 127 – Clare, Jackson	Exit 78 on US 127
Ingham	Lansing	127.528	205.236		BL I-69 east	Eastern end of BL I-69 concurrency
Ingham	East Lansing	128.644– 128.665	207.032– 207.066		M-143 west (Michigan Avenue west)	Eastern terminus of M-143
Ingham	Leroy Township	142.959	230.070		M-52 north – Owosso	Northern end of M-52 concurrency
Ingham	Webberville	144.789– 144.835	233.015– 233.089		I-96 – Lansing, Detroit M-52 south – Chelsea	Southern end of concurrency with M-52 at exit 122 on I-96
1.000 mi = 1.609 km; 1.000 km = 0.621 mi: Concurrency terminus

== Business loop ==
Business M-43
- Location: Grand Ledge
- Length: 2.423 mi (3.899 km)
- Existed: November 14, 1959–1968

Business M-43 (Bus. M-43) was a business loop through the city of Grand Ledge. It ran east along Jefferson Street. The street curves to the southeast at a bend in the Grand River. M-100 merges in from the northeast at Bridge Street. The two highways ran concurrently south to Saginaw Highway. There, Bus. M-43 ended at the intersection with M-43 while M-100 continued south.

The business loop was created when M-43 was rerouted to a new roadway southwest of downtown Grand Ledge. This roadway opened on November 14, 1959, at which time the business loop was signed along the former route in town. In 1968, Bus. M-43 was decommissioned. The section not concurrent with M-100 was turned over to local control and removed from the state trunkline highway system.
