= Barry County Courthouse =

- Barry County Courthouse Complex
- U.S. National Register of Historic Places
- Michigan State Historic Site
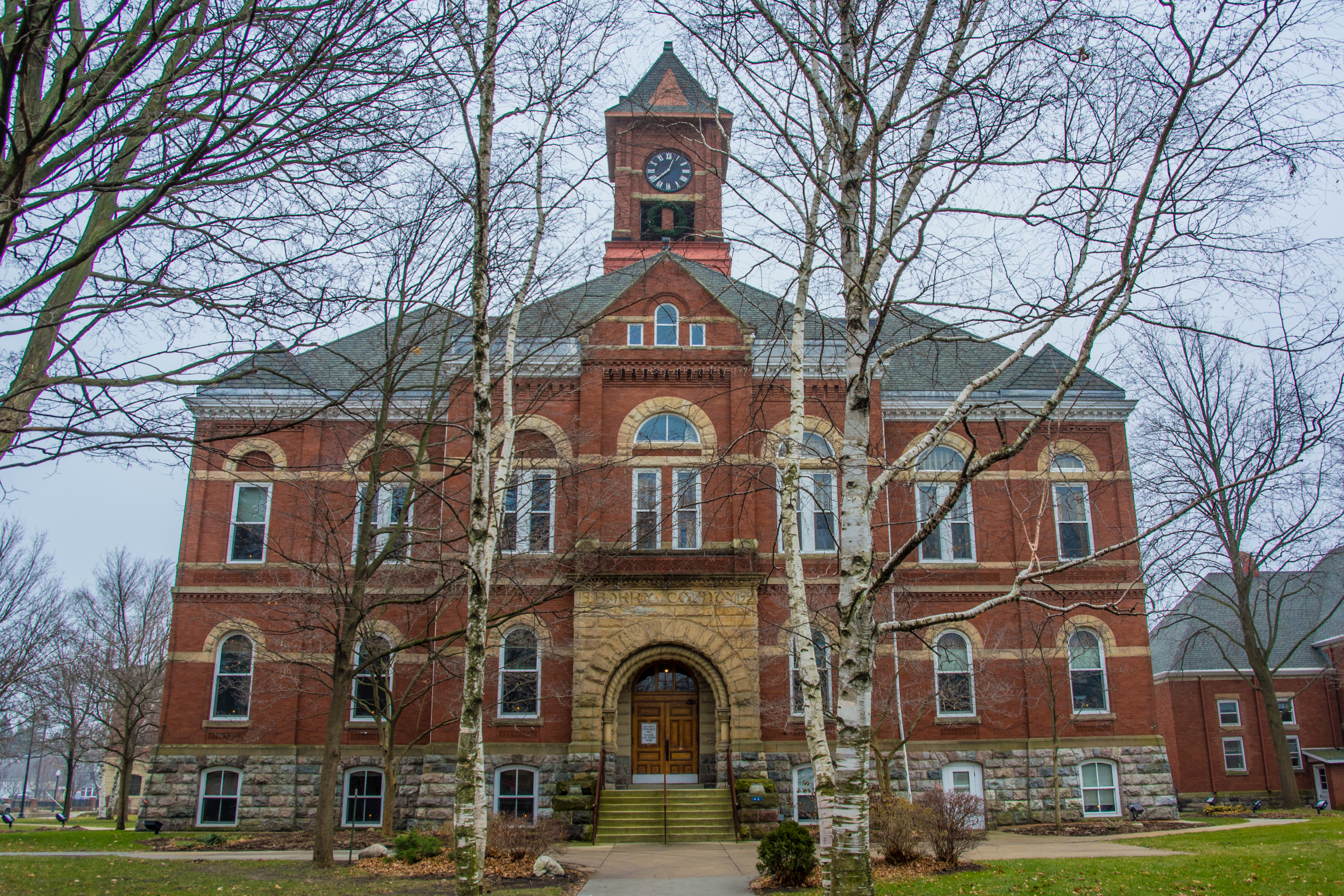

- Location within Michigan Location within the United States
- Interactive map showing the location of Barry County Courthouse
- Location: 220 W. State St., Hastings, Michigan
- Coordinates: 42°38′53″N 85°17′24″W
- Area: 2 acres (0.81 ha)
- Built: 1892
- Architect: Albert E. French
- Architectural style: Late Victorian, Queen Anne, Richardsonian Romanesque
- NRHP reference No.: 81000303

Significant dates
- Added to NRHP: August 3, 1981
- Designated MSHS: February 28, 1969

The Barry County Courthouse is a government building located at 220 West State Street in Hastings, Michigan. It was designated a Michigan State Historic Site in 1969 and listed on the National Register of Historic Places in 1981.

== History ==
Hastings was originally platted in 1836 by the Hastings Company. The company reserved a location for a courthouse; Barry County was organized in 1839, and in 1842 the first courthouse was constructed on this spot by the county government. This courthouse burned down in 1846, and in 1847 a new courthouse and jail, a two-story white frame structure, was constructed. Hastings was chartered as a village in 1855, and both the village and the surrounding county grew. In 1886, a devastating fire swept through Hastings, and, although the courthouse was spared, suggestions began to replace it with a brick structure. By early 1892, money was appropriated, and the county hired Detroit architect Albert E. French to design a new courthouse. Construction began on the current courthouse in 1892, and finished in 1894.

== Description ==
The Barry County Courthouse is a three-story red brick rectangular building with a central square tower and a complex system of hip roofs. It appears very similar to the slightly older Livingston County Courthouse, also designed by Albert E. French. The building sits on a rock-face foundation. The design of the building is eclectic, combining Late Victorian, Queen Anne, and Richardsonian Romanesque elements. Cut stone frames the building's windows and entrances. Decorative tiles and brickwork accent the window openings. The building has four arched entrance portals, one on each side. The main (and most ornate) entrance is on the north side, and includes flanking Romanesque columns and the inscription "Barry County" with the date of construction carved above the arch.

The old jail and sheriff's residence, is located to the rear of the court building. The jail is a 2 1/2-story red brick Queen Anne structure.

In 1994, a new Barry County Courts Building was constructed across the street from the old courthouse.
