= Wexford County Civic Center =

American arena

The Wexford Civic Center
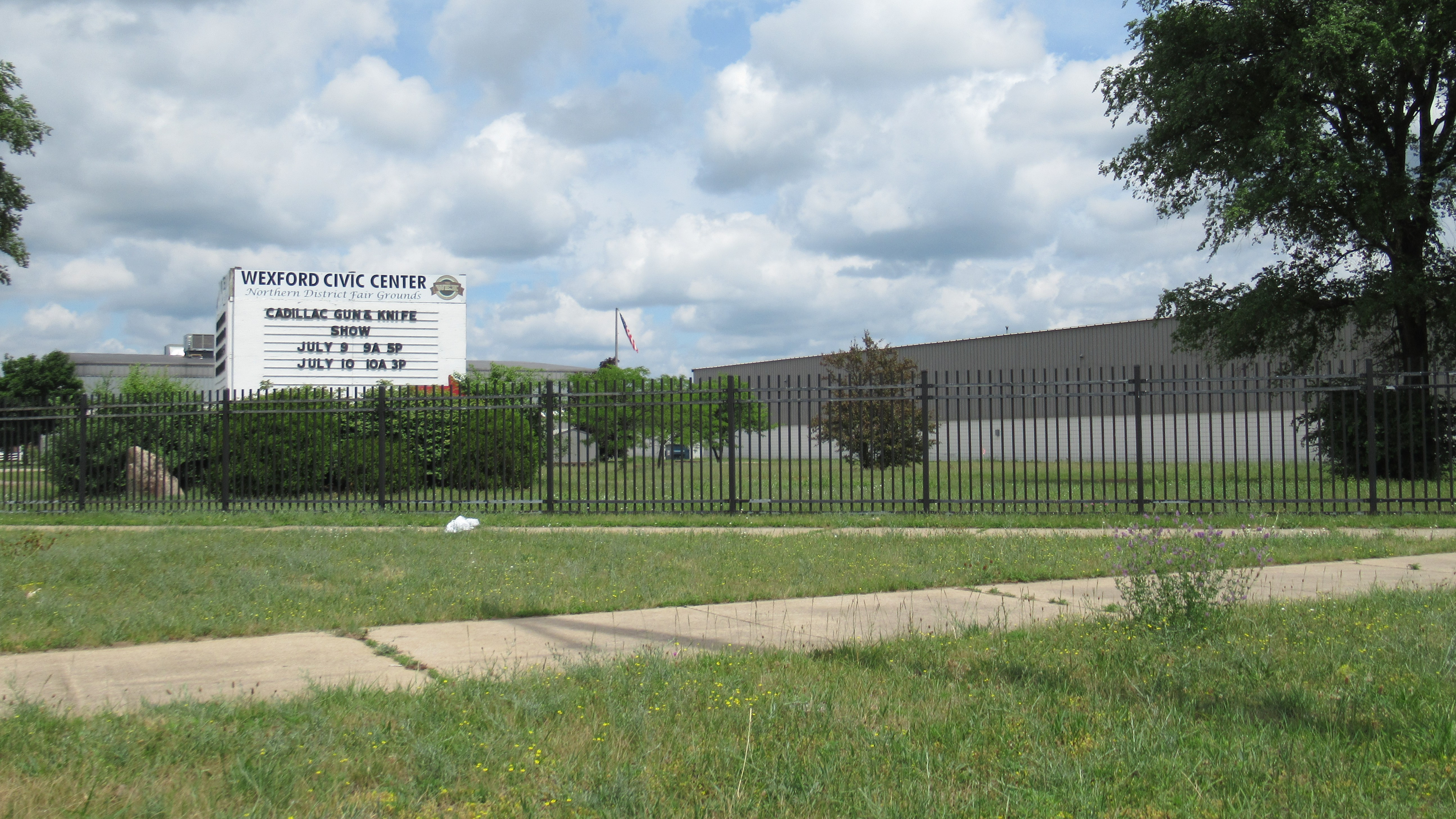
- View from Mitchell Street and E. 13th Street

- Location within the state of Michigan Location within the United States
- Address: 1320 N. Mitchell Street; Haring, Michigan 49601
- Coordinates: 44°16′06″N 85°24′21″W

Website
- Official website

The Wexford County Civic Center is an indoor arena located in Cadillac, Michigan. It currently seats up to 1,800 in retractable bleachers for sporting events and up to 2,700 for concerts. An ice arena and the county fairgrounds are nearby.

The Civic Center, which resembles a gymnasium more than an arena, features 20,000 square feet (2,000 m^{2}) of space and can also be used for trade shows, conventions, banquets, circuses and other events. Currently the locker rooms at the Civic Center are undergoing renovations.
