= Liberty Township, Wexford County, Michigan =

Liberty Township, Michigan
- Civil township
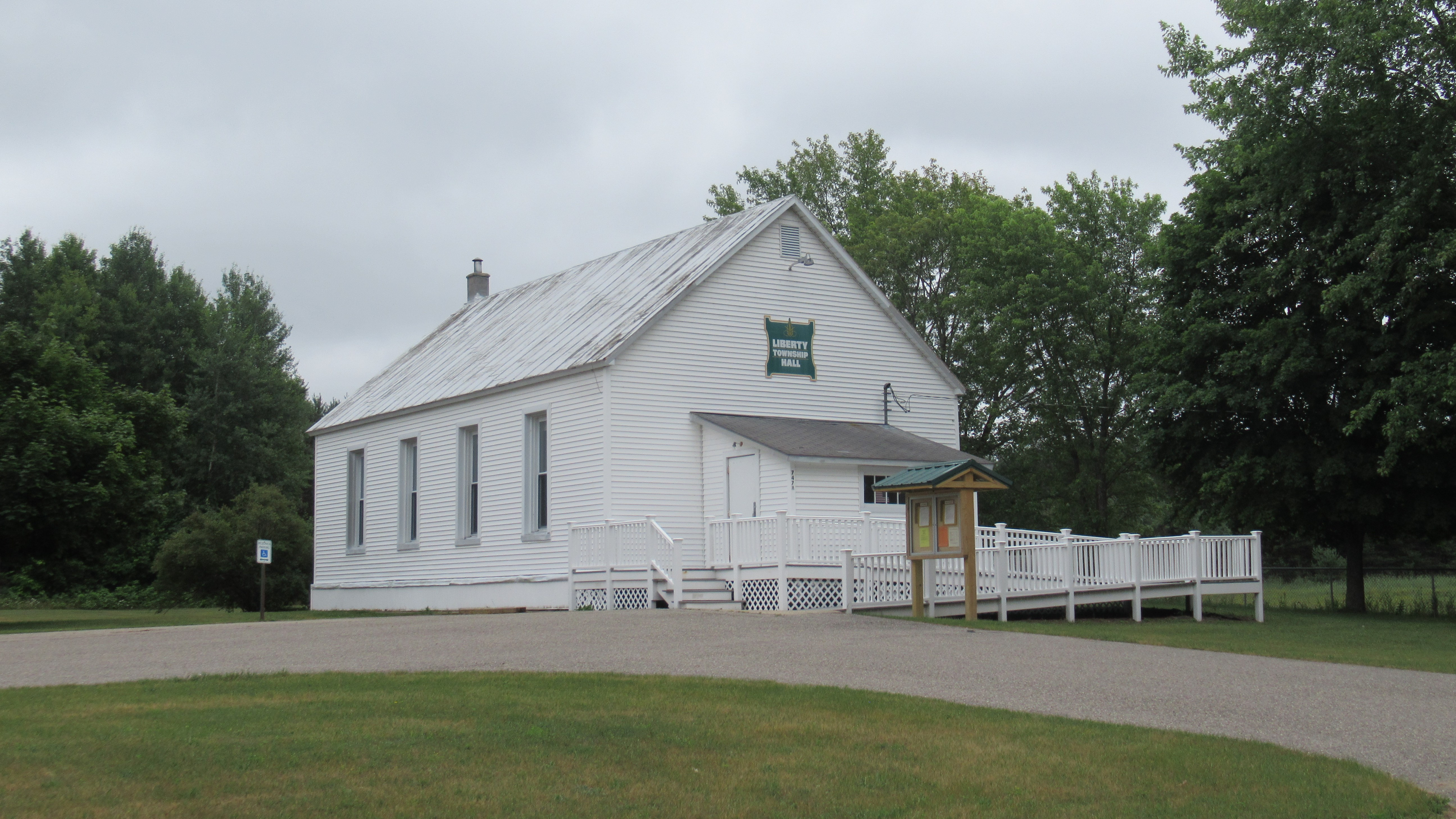
- Liberty Township Hall

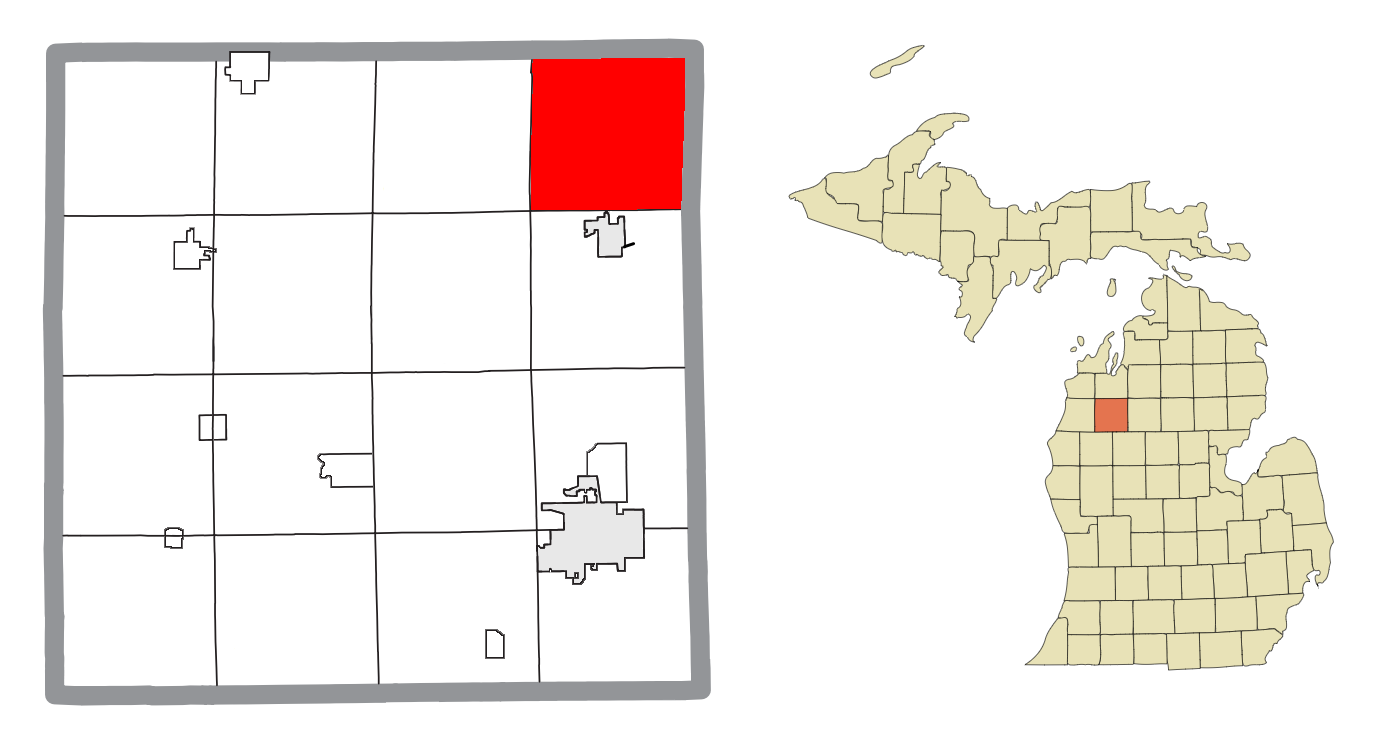
- Location within Wexford County

- Location within the state of Michigan Location within the United States
- Coordinates: 44°28′06″N 85°24′00″W
- Country: United States
- State: Michigan
- County: Wexford

Government
  - Supervisor: Bradley Swanson
  - Clerk: Amanda Kimbel-Sparks

Area
  - Total: 36.53 sq mi (94.61 km^{2})
  - Land: 36.51 sq mi (94.56 km^{2})
  - Water: 0.019 sq mi (0.05 km^{2})
- Elevation: 1,027 ft (313 m)

Population (2020)
  - Total: 936
  - Density: 25.6/sq mi (9.90/km^{2})
- Time zone: UTC-5 (Eastern (EST))
  - Summer (DST): UTC-4 (EDT)
- ZIP code(s): 49633 (Fife Lake); 49663 (Manton)
- Area code: 231
- FIPS code: 26-47380
- GNIS feature ID: 1626614
- Website: https://www.libertytownshipwexfordmi.gov/

Liberty Township is a civil township of Wexford County in the U.S. state of Michigan. The population was 936 at the 2020 census.

== Communities ==
- Haire is a former settlement within the township that was settled as a lumber community along the Grand Rapids and Indiana Railroad. The post office in Haire operated from August 21, 1883 until December 15, 1908.

== Geography ==
According to the U.S. Census Bureau, the township has a total area of 36.53 square miles (94.61 km^{2}), of which 36.51 square miles (94.56 km^{2}) is land and 0.02 square miles (0.05 km^{2}) (0.05%) is water.

The Manistee River flows through the center of the township.

=== Major highways ===
- US 131 runs south–north through the center of the township.
- Bus. US 131 enters from the south from Manton and ends at U.S. Route 131 in the center of the township.

== Demographics ==
As of the 2010 United States census, there were 861 people, 406 households, and 235 families in the township. The population density was 23.6 per square mile (8.5/km^{2}). The housing density was 11.1 per square mile (4.2/km^{2}). The racial makeup of the township was 96.3% White, 0.9% Hispanic or Latino, 0.7% Native American, 0.5% Asian, and 2.6% were two or more races.

25.0%% of households had children under the age of 18 living with them, 62.4% were married couples living together, 6.8% had a female householder with no husband present, and 27.0% were non-families. The average household size was 2.64 and the average family size was 3.04.

The township population contained 25.0% under the age of 18, 6.2% from 18 to 24, 22.5% from 25 to 44, 30.8% from 45 to 64, and 15.6% who were 65 years of age or older. The median age was 43 years. For every 100 females, there were 97 males.

The median income for a household in the township was $43,864, and the median income for a family was $40,781. Males had a median income of $28,162 versus $21,250 for females. The per capita income for the township was $17,612. About 5.7% of families and 9.2% of the population were below the poverty line, including 8.3% of those under age 18 and 7.2% of those age 65 or over.

== Education ==
Liberty Township is served entirely by Manton Consolidated Schools just to the south in the city of Manton.
