= Albert Leroy Rule =

American film director

Albert Leroy Rule (born 27 July 1886 Hastings, Michigan; died 10 August 1943 Chicago) was a producer and director of two World War I documentaries. Rule had served as a private in the American Expeditionary Forces of World War I and received a discharge in 1920. Rule adopted a nickname title of "Colonel" while in the movie business.

== Filmography ==
- The Big Drive, (premier: December 14, 1932, McVickers Theater, Chicago), directed by Albert L. Rule, distributed by RKO
- When Germany Surrendered, originally released as The Death Parade (premier: 1934, Danville, Illinois, re-released 1939), produced, directed, and narrated by Albert L. Rule, distributed by RKO OCLC 423401148
