= Constantine Township, Michigan =

- Township
- Location within the state of Michigan Constantine Township, Michigan (the United States)
- Coordinates: 41°50′57″N 85°40′43″W
- Country: United States
- State: Michigan
- County: St. Joseph

Area
  - Total: 35.6 sq mi (92.3 km^{2})
  - Land: 34.6 sq mi (89.5 km^{2})
  - Water: 1.1 sq mi (2.8 km^{2})
- Elevation: 801 ft (244 m)

Population (2020)
  - Total: 4,037
  - Density: 117/sq mi (45.1/km^{2})
- Time zone: UTC-5 (Eastern (EST))
  - Summer (DST): UTC-4 (EDT)
- FIPS code: 26-17860
- GNIS feature ID: 1626128
- Website: Township website

Constantine Township is a civil township of St. Joseph County in the U.S. state of Michigan. The population was 4,037 at the 2020 census. The village of Constantine is located within the township.

== Name and history ==
Constantine Township was named for the Roman emperor Constantine the Great.

== Geography ==
According to the United States Census Bureau, the township has a total area of 35.6 square miles (92 km^{2}), of which 34.6 square miles (90 km^{2}) is land and 1.1 square miles (2.8 km^{2}) (3.00%) is water.

== Communities ==
- Eschol was a community in this township. It was platted in 1833 on the banks of the St. Joseph River. It was destroyed by a dam burst in 1840.

== Demographics ==
As of the census of 2000, there were 4,181 people, 1,560 households, and 1,151 families residing in the township. The population density was 121.0 inhabitants per square mile (46.7/km^{2}). There were 1,696 housing units at an average density of 49.1 per square mile (19.0/km^{2}). The racial makeup of the township was 96.15% White, 0.53% African American, 0.22% Native American, 0.67% Asian, 0.45% from other races, and 1.99% from two or more races. Hispanic or Latino of any race were 1.12% of the population.

There were 1,560 households, out of which 38.5% had children under the age of 18 living with them, 56.7% were married couples living together, 10.6% had a female householder with no husband present, and 26.2% were non-families. 21.1% of all households were made up of individuals, and 8.6% had someone living alone who was 65 years of age or older. The average household size was 2.68 and the average family size was 3.05.

In the township the population was spread out, with 28.6% under the age of 18, 9.3% from 18 to 24, 28.4% from 25 to 44, 22.7% from 45 to 64, and 10.9% who were 65 years of age or older. The median age was 34 years. For every 100 females, there were 100.8 males. For every 100 females age 18 and over, there were 98.5 males.

The median income for a household in the township was $43,125, and the median income for a family was $47,795. Males had a median income of $36,272 versus $24,643 for females. The per capita income for the township was $16,909. About 10.9% of families and 11.8% of the population were below the poverty line, including 15.0% of those under age 18 and 6.5% of those age 65 or over.
