= M-143 (Michigan highway) =

State highway in East Lansing, Ingham County, Michigan, United States

M-143
- Michigan Avenue
- M-143 highlighted in red

Route information
- Maintained by MDOT
- Length: 0.936 mi (1,506 m)
- Existed: 1962–present

Major junctions
- West end: Lansing–East Lansing city line
- East end: M-43 in East Lansing

Location
- Country: United States
- State: Michigan
- Counties: Ingham

Highway system
- Michigan State Trunkline Highway System; Interstate; US; State; Byways
← M-142	→ M-144

M-143, also known as Michigan Avenue, is a previously unsigned spur state trunkline highway in the south central region of the US state of Michigan. The M-143 portion of Michigan Avenue runs from the East Lansing city limit to a junction with M-43 at Grand River Avenue. This highway is the second time that there has been an M-143 in Michigan. The first was a connection to the original Cheboygan State Park. The current is a remnant of M-43 in the Lansing area.

== Route description ==
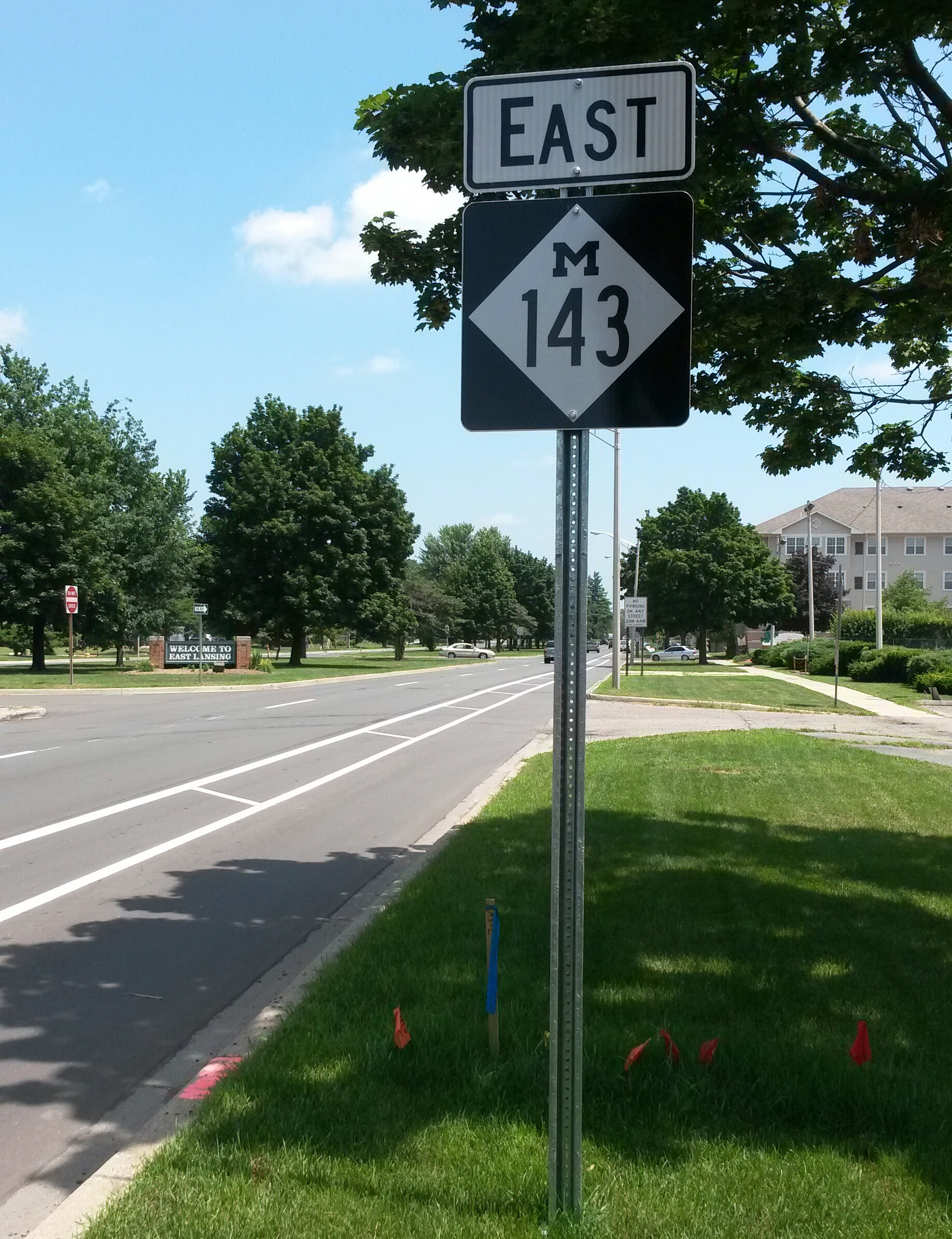
Eastbound M-143 begins at the East Lansing–Lansing border

Michigan Avenue travels through the Greater Lansing area on an east–west axis which runs through the Capitol Building in downtown Lansing. While disconnected between Martin Luther King Jr. Boulevard and Capitol Avenue in the downtown area, the eastern portion of Michigan Avenue begins at the Capitol and runs easterly, ending in downtown East Lansing. For much of its length in the City of Lansing, Michigan Avenue is a five-lane thoroughfare maintained by the city. Just west of US Highway 127 (US 127), the street transitions into a six-lane boulevard and proceeds easterly to the East Lansing city limit. From that point easterly for about a mile (1.6 km) to M-43 at Grand River Avenue in downtown East Lansing, Michigan Avenue is state-maintained as a four- to six-lane boulevard designated M-143. Michigan Avenue here is the northern boundary of the main campus of Michigan State University near the Red Cedar River. This highway designation was not signed on Michigan Avenue for a number of years, even though the street was under the control of the Michigan Department of Transportation (MDOT). In 2011, MDOT's traffic surveys showed that on average, between 19,503 and 20,308 vehicles used the trunkline daily. No section of M-143 is listed on the National Highway System, a network of roads important to the country's economy, defense, and mobility.

== History ==
=== Previous designation ===
M-143
- Location: Cheboygan
- Length: 0.435 mi (700 m)
- Existed: 1931–Late 1960

The first usage of M-143 was designated from US 27 (now M-27) south of Cheboygan eastward for about a mile on Lincoln Avenue to the original Cheboygan State Park in 1931. The park was removed from the state park system during World War II. The highway along Lincoln Avenue was transferred back to local control in late 1960.

=== Current designation ===
In late 1962, US 16 was decommissioned in the state of Michigan as Interstate 96 (I-96) was completed. With the removal of US 16, several highways were rerouted through Lansing. M-43 was rerouted along M-78 to Grand River Avenue and then along Grand River Avenue to replace US 16 east to Webberville. The former M-43 on Michigan Avenue east of Cedar and Larch streets was redesignated M-143.

As part of the creation of the Capitol Loop, M-143 and Michigan Avenue in Lansing was partially transferred back to local control. The section between Cedar and Larch streets was retained as part of the new Capitol Loop and the remainder inside the city of Lansing was removed from the state trunkline highway system on October 13, 1989. At the time, M-143 in the City of East Lansing was not transferred, and MDOT removed the signage, creating an unsigned trunkline.

Since then, MDOT has used the trunkline's designation on maps and in brochures related to a 2013 reconstruction project on Michigan Avenue in East Lansing. Signage has also been erected, and the highway has been restored to the official state map in 2013.

== Major intersections ==
The entire highway is in Ingham County.

Location	mi	km	Destinations	Notes
Lansing–East Lansing city line	0.000	0.000	Highland Street	Western terminus on the city line
East Lansing	0.936	1.506	M-43 (Grand River Avenue)	
1.000 mi = 1.609 km; 1.000 km = 0.621 mi
