= Hastings, Michigan =

Hastings
- City
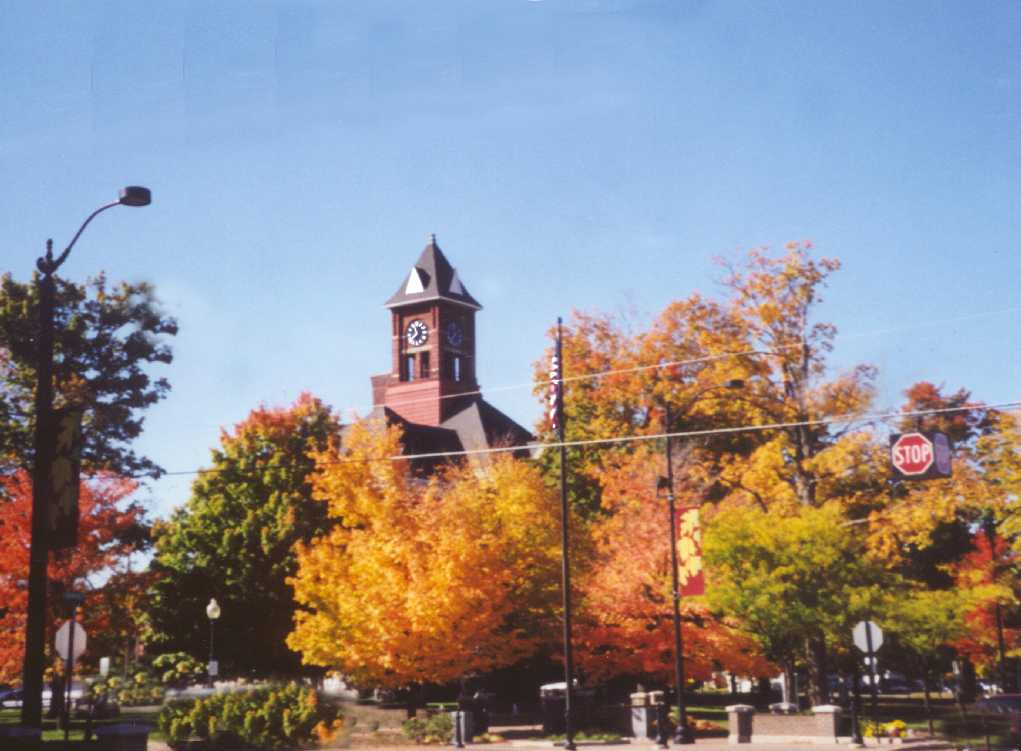
- Barry County Courthouse in downtown Hastings

- Location within Barry County

- Location within the state of Michigan Hastings (the United States)
- Coordinates: 42°38′45″N 85°17′27″W
- Country: United States
- State: Michigan
- County: Barry

Government
  - Mayor: David J. Tossava

Area
  - Total: 5.29 sq mi (13.70 km^{2})
  - Land: 5.21 sq mi (13.50 km^{2})
  - Water: 0.077 sq mi (0.20 km^{2})
- Elevation: 810 ft (250 m)

Population (2020)
  - Total: 7,514
  - Density: 1,442.1/sq mi (556.78/km^{2})
- Time zone: UTC-5 (Eastern (EST))
  - Summer (DST): UTC-4 (EDT)
- ZIP code: 49058
- Area code: 269
- FIPS code: 26-37120
- GNIS feature ID: 1618841
- Website: Official website

Hastings (/ˈheɪstɪŋs/ HAY-stings) is a city in the U.S. state of Michigan. It is the county seat of Barry County, as well as the county's only city. The population was 7,514 at the 2020 census. The city borders Hastings Charter Township on the north, east, and south, and Rutland Charter Township on the west.

== History ==
In 1836 three entrepreneurs named Dibble, Kingsbury and Kendall bought 480 acres (1.9 km^{2}) along the Thornapple River from Detroit banker Eurotas P. Hastings. The three platted the area into lots, and soon a small community arose. In 1843, the state legislature designated Hastings as the county seat of Barry County. The first paper, the Barry County Pioneer, began publishing in 1851, and a second paper, the Republican Banner, began in 1856. The latter publication, a weekly paper published on Thursdays, continues to be published as the Hastings Banner.

Hastings was incorporated as a village in 1855, with a population of around 300, and on March 11, 1871, Hastings officially became a city. The Barry County Courthouse, which is still in use today, was built in 1893. The city grew slowly, reaching 6,500 people in 1960 and with nearly flat growth through 1990.

== Geography ==
According to the United States Census Bureau, the city has a total area of 5.28 square miles (13.68 km^{2}), of which 5.20 square miles (13.47 km^{2}) is land and 0.08 square miles (0.21 km^{2}) is water. The Thornapple River passes through the city from east to west.

=== Climate ===
The Köppen climate classification subtype for this climate is "Dfb" (Warm Summer Continental Climate).

Climate data for Hastings, Michigan (1991–2020 normals, extremes 1893–present)
Month	Jan	Feb	Mar	Apr	May	Jun	Jul	Aug	Sep	Oct	Nov	Dec	Year
Record high °F (°C)	66 (19)	70 (21)	87 (31)	92 (33)	97 (36)	104 (40)	109 (43)	105 (41)	97 (36)	90 (32)	82 (28)	70 (21)	109 (43)
Mean daily maximum °F (°C)	30.5 (−0.8)	33.8 (1.0)	44.2 (6.8)	56.9 (13.8)	68.9 (20.5)	78.1 (25.6)	82.1 (27.8)	80.2 (26.8)	73.8 (23.2)	60.8 (16.0)	46.7 (8.2)	35.4 (1.9)	57.6 (14.2)
Daily mean °F (°C)	23.3 (−4.8)	25.1 (−3.8)	33.9 (1.1)	45.4 (7.4)	57.1 (13.9)	66.7 (19.3)	70.5 (21.4)	68.8 (20.4)	61.7 (16.5)	50.0 (10.0)	38.5 (3.6)	28.8 (−1.8)	47.5 (8.6)
Mean daily minimum °F (°C)	16.1 (−8.8)	16.3 (−8.7)	23.6 (−4.7)	34.0 (1.1)	45.3 (7.4)	55.3 (12.9)	58.8 (14.9)	57.4 (14.1)	49.7 (9.8)	39.3 (4.1)	30.3 (−0.9)	22.3 (−5.4)	37.4 (3.0)
Record low °F (°C)	−24 (−31)	−31 (−35)	−17 (−27)	1 (−17)	20 (−7)	30 (−1)	36 (2)	30 (−1)	25 (−4)	15 (−9)	−7 (−22)	−22 (−30)	−31 (−35)
Average precipitation inches (mm)	2.62 (67)	2.13 (54)	2.47 (63)	3.83 (97)	4.40 (112)	4.19 (106)	3.43 (87)	3.84 (98)	3.30 (84)	3.99 (101)	2.92 (74)	2.47 (63)	39.59 (1,006)
Average snowfall inches (cm)	21.5 (55)	15.3 (39)	7.2 (18)	2.1 (5.3)	0.0 (0.0)	0.0 (0.0)	0.0 (0.0)	0.0 (0.0)	0.0 (0.0)	0.3 (0.76)	5.4 (14)	16.2 (41)	68.0 (173)
Average precipitation days (≥ 0.01 in)	16.4	12.3	11.5	13.1	13.4	11.5	9.4	11.2	10.0	13.1	12.5	14.9	149.3
Average snowy days (≥ 0.1 in)	14.6	11.5	6.3	2.2	0.0	0.0	0.0	0.0	0.0	0.3	4.3	11.2	50.4
Source: NOAA

== Demographics ==
Historical population
Census	Pop.	Note	%±
1870	1,793		—
1880	2,531		41.2%
1890	2,972		17.4%
1900	3,172		6.7%
1910	4,383		38.2%
1920	5,132		17.1%
1930	5,227		1.9%
1940	5,175		−1.0%
1950	6,096		17.8%
1960	6,375		4.6%
1970	6,501		2.0%
1980	6,418		−1.3%
1990	6,549		2.0%
2000	7,095		8.3%
2010	7,350		3.6%
2020	7,514		2.2%
U.S. Decennial Census

=== 2020 census ===
As of the 2020 census, Hastings had a population of 7,514. The median age was 39.0 years. 22.7% of residents were under the age of 18 and 19.3% of residents were 65 years of age or older. For every 100 females there were 89.7 males, and for every 100 females age 18 and over there were 85.6 males age 18 and over.

95.1% of residents lived in urban areas, while 4.9% lived in rural areas.

There were 3,148 households in Hastings, of which 28.0% had children under the age of 18 living in them. Of all households, 39.8% were married-couple households, 17.9% were households with a male householder and no spouse or partner present, and 33.4% were households with a female householder and no spouse or partner present. About 34.1% of all households were made up of individuals and 16.9% had someone living alone who was 65 years of age or older.

There were 3,305 housing units, of which 4.8% were vacant. The homeowner vacancy rate was 1.6% and the rental vacancy rate was 2.9%.

Racial composition as of the 2020 census
Race	Number	Percent
White	6,887	91.7%
Black or African American	24	0.3%
American Indian and Alaska Native	34	0.5%
Asian	50	0.7%
Native Hawaiian and Other Pacific Islander	0	0.0%
Some other race	90	1.2%
Two or more races	429	5.7%
Hispanic or Latino (of any race)	296	3.9%

=== 2010 census ===
As of the census of 2010, there were 7,350 people, 2,910 households, and 1,849 families living in the city. The population density was 1,413.5 inhabitants per square mile (545.8/km^{2}). There were 3,231 housing units at an average density of 621.3 per square mile (239.9/km^{2}). The racial makeup of the city was 96.9% White, 2.7% Hispanic or Latino, 0.5% African American, 0.6% Native American, 0.3% Asian, 0.5% from other races, and 1.2% from two or more races.

There were 2,910 households, of which 34.9% had children under the age of 18 living with them, 44.2% were married couples living together, 14.4% had a female householder with no husband present, 5.0% had a male householder with no wife present, and 36.5% were non-families. 31.0% of all households were made up of individuals, and 14.9% had someone living alone who was 65 years of age or older. The average household size was 2.47 and the average family size was 3.07.

The median age in the city was 36.2 years. 26.6% of residents were under the age of 18; 9% were between the ages of 18 and 24; 24.7% were from 25 to 44; 24.1% were from 45 to 64; and 15.4% were 65 years of age or older. The gender makeup of the city was 46.9% male and 53.1% female.

=== 2000 census ===
As of the census of 2000, there were 7,095 people, 2,759 households, and 1,826 families living in the city. The population density was 1,353.3 inhabitants per square mile (522.5/km^{2}). There were 2,898 housing units at an average density of 552.8 per square mile (213.4/km^{2}). The racial makeup of the city was 97.31% White, 0.14% African American, 0.47% Native American, 0.32% Asian, 0.58% from other races, and 1.18% from two or more races. Hispanic or Latino of any race were 2.14% of the population.

There were 2,759 households, out of which 35.9% had children under the age of 18 living with them, 49.9% were married couples living together, 12.5% had a female householder with no husband present, and 33.8% were non-families. 28.9% of all households were made up of individuals, and 13.7% had someone living alone who was 65 years of age or older. The average household size was 2.50 and the average family size was 3.08.

In the city, the population was spread out, with 27.7% under the age of 18, 9.1% from 18 to 24, 29.2% from 25 to 44, 18.6% from 45 to 64, and 15.3% who were 65 years of age or older. The median age was 34 years. For every 100 females, there were 88.2 males. For every 100 females age 18 and over, there were 83.1 males.

The median income for a household in the city was $39,033, and the median income for a family was $44,886. Males had a median income of $35,226 versus $24,727 for females. The per capita income for the city was $18,042. About 5.9% of families and 8.1% of the population were below the poverty line, including 8.3% of those under age 18 and 5.8% of those age 65 or over.

== Arts and culture ==
Each April, Hastings hosts a three-day jazz festival.

Hastings is home to The Fair Ground Festival, an annual music festival held in 2023 and 2024.

Hastings Live provides three months of concerts and children's programming each summer.

The Hastings Performing Arts Center opened in 2019 and hosts concerts and programming year-round.

The annual Barry-Roubaix cycling race in Hastings was founded in 2013.

== Education ==
=== Hastings Area School System ===
The Hastings Area School System comprises six schools:

- Hastings High School
- Hastings Middle School
- Central Elementary
- Southeastern Elementary
- Northeastern Elementary
- Star Elementary

Additionally, Hastings offers pre-K to grade-12 services to students with special needs:

- Barry ISD Special Education

=== Private schools ===
- St. Rose of Lima is a Catholic elementary school offering grades K-6 as well as a licensed preschool program.
- Barry County Christian School, Hastings Campus

=== Community college ===
Kellogg Community College (with its main campus in Battle Creek, Michigan) has maintained a regional campus at the Fehsenfeld Center in Hastings since 1996.

== Infrastructure ==
=== Major highways ===
- M-37
- M-43
- M-79

=== Public library ===
A new Hastings Public Library opened on June 7, 2007, replacing the facility of 1965.

== Notable people ==
- Lady Baldwin, MLB baseball player in 1800s
- Gladeon M. Barnes, U.S. Army major general
- Dann Howitt, former MLB player
- Gordon Johncock, auto-racer and two-time winner of the Indianapolis 500
- Dave Joppie, MLB player and coach
- John C. Ketcham, congressman
- Loyal Edwin Knappen, judge of United States District Court for the Western District of Michigan
- Charles Rufus Morey, art historian
- Fred Rehor, pre-NFL professional football player for the Massillon Tigers
- Bruce Rendon, politician
- Albert Leroy Rule, documentary film producer
