= Roben–Hood Airport =

Airport in Big Rapids, Michigan, United States

- IATA: WBR; ICAO: KRQB; FAA LID: RQB

Summary
- Airport type: Public
- Owner: City of Big Rapids
- Serves: Big Rapids, Michigan
- Location: Big Rapids, MI, 49307
- Elevation AMSL: 990 ft (300 m)
- Coordinates: 43°43′21″N 085°30′15″W
- Website: www.colt-aviation.com

Map
- Location of airport in Michigan WBR/KRQB/RQB (the United States)

Runways
Direction	Length		Surface
Direction	ft	m	Surface
10/28	5,000	1,524	Asphalt
14/32	2,700	823	Asphalt

Statistics (2005)
- Aircraft operations: 4,040
- Source: Federal Aviation Administration

Roben–Hood Airport (IATA: WBR, ICAO: KRQB, FAA LID: RQB) is a public airport located 2 mi (3.2 km) northwest of the central business district of Big Rapids, a city in Mecosta County, Michigan, United States. It is owned by the City of Big Rapids. It is included in the Federal Aviation Administration (FAA) National Plan of Integrated Airport Systems for 2017–2021, in which it is categorized as a local general aviation facility.

Although most U.S. airports use the same three-letter location identifier for the FAA and IATA, Roben–Hood Airport is assigned RQB by the FAA and WBR by the IATA.

The airport hosts a regular airshow featuring antique aircraft and activities.

== History ==
Formerly known as Mecosta County Airport, Roben–Hood Airport was named after two men from Big Rapids, Michigan, Major Douglas Bennett Roben and Lt. Daniel George Hood, both of whom died during service in World War I.

== Facilities and aircraft ==
Roben–Hood Airport covers an area of 629 acres (255 ha) which contains two asphalt paved runways: 10/28 measuring 5,000 x 75 ft (1,524 x 23 m) and 14/32 measuring 2,700 x 75 ft (823 x 23 m). For the 12-month period ending December 31, 2020, the airport had 4,000 general aviation aircraft operations, an average of 77 per day. For the same time period, there are 22 aircraft based on the field: 19 single-engine and 2 multi-engine airplanes as well as 1 helicopter.

The airport has a fixed-base operator that sells fuel and offers general maintenance, hangars, courtesy transportation, conference rooms, and more.

The airport is staffed Monday through Friday from 8:00 a.m. to 5:00 p.m. and is accessible by road from 18 Mile Rd, and is close to Business US-131.

== Accidents & Incidents ==
- On April 4, 2004, a Beech C35 Bonanza experienced a forced landing near Roben–Hood after a loss of engine power. The engine had just been overhauled and reinstalled, and ground runs and test flights were completed. The aircraft was reportedly flying normally except for a slightly higher fuel pressure. The failure occurred while descending into the airport. The probable cause was found to be the total loss of engine power due to the pilot's improper fuel management which led to fuel starvation.
- On August 23, 2006, a Frick Questair Q20 crashed while diverting to Roben–Hood following a loss of engine power in flight. The aircraft reported an emergency in-flight and requested a diversion but crashed 4 miles short of the airport. The probable cause was found to be the pilot's failure to ensure an adequate fuel supply, which resulted in the exhaustion of the fuel supply and the subsequent loss of engine power.
- On March 14, 2007, a Cessna 172 struck snowbanks after lifting off and nosed over. The student pilot aboard was practicing a soft field takeoff and did not realize the plane was drifting left due to the low visibility in the maneuver until too late. He attempted evasive maneuvers, but the landing gear struck the snow bank. The probable cause was found to be the student pilot's failure to maintain directional control of the airplane during takeoff which led to the impact with the snow banks adjacent to the runway.
- On May 7, 2017, a Cessna A185 crashed during its landing roll after encountering a wind gust from the left. The aircraft slightly climbed and weathervaned and descended back into the ground, at which point it spun about the nose to the left, substantially damaging the aircraft. The probable cause was found to be the pilot’s failure to obtain updated weather information while practicing takeoffs and landings and his subsequent failure to maintain directional control during the landing roll in gusting crosswind conditions.

== See also ==
- List of airports in Michigan
