= Wexford County Airport =

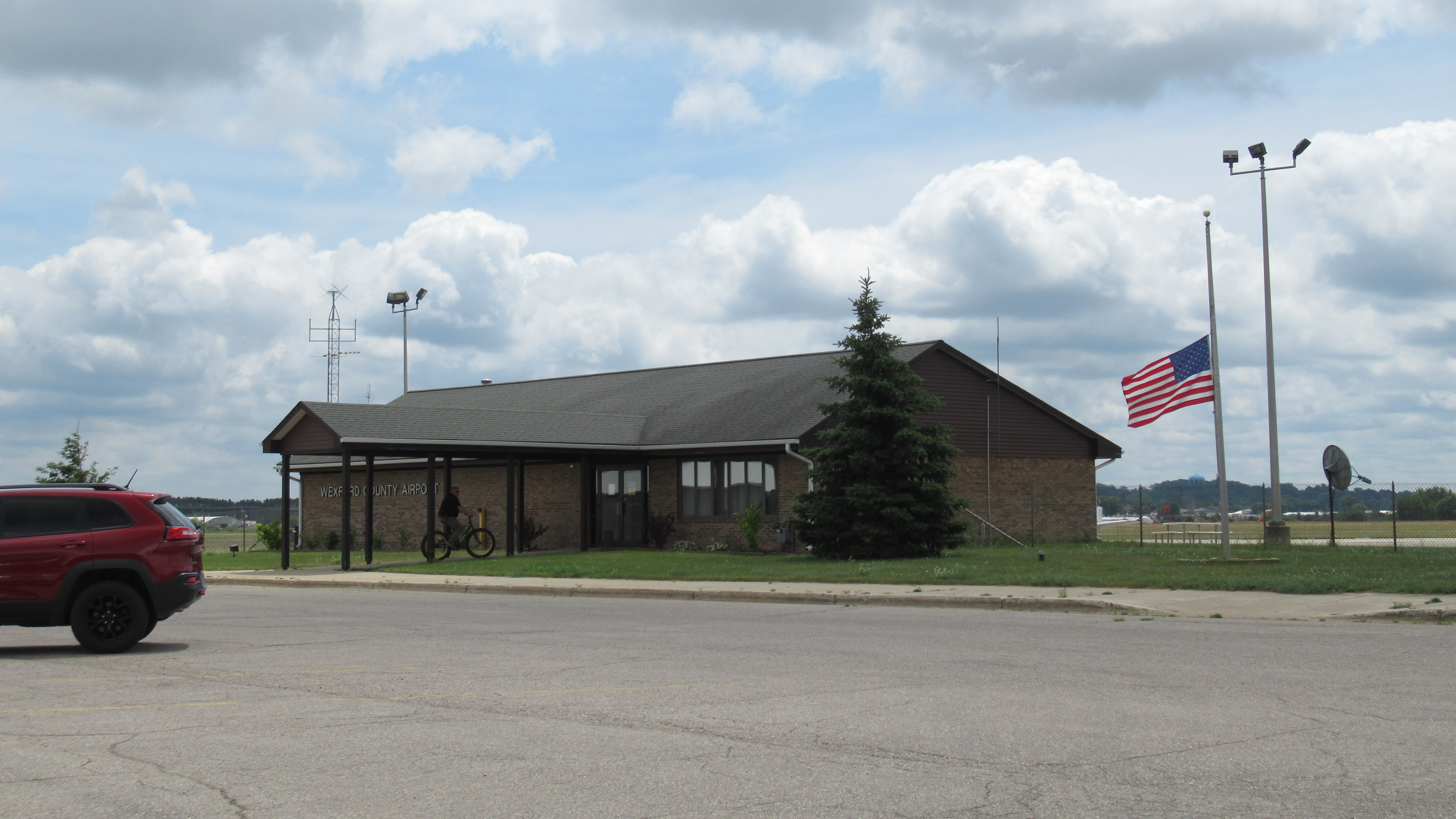
- Wexford County Airport terminal
- IATA: CAD; ICAO: KCAD; FAA LID: CAD

Summary
- Airport type: Public
- Operator: Wexford County Airport Authority
- Location: Cadillac, Michigan
- Elevation AMSL: 1,307 ft / 398.4 m
- Coordinates: 44°16′31.12″N 85°25′08.13″W

Map
- Location of airport in Michigan CAD (the United States)

Runways
Direction	Length		Surface
Direction	ft	m	Surface
7/25	5,000	1,524	Asphalt
18/36	2,005	611	Turf

Statistics (2020)
- Aircraft Movements: 8,030
- Based Aircraft: 43

Wexford County Airport (IATA: CAD, ICAO: KCAD, FAA LID: CAD) is a general aviation airport located in the city of Cadillac in Wexford County, Michigan, United States. The airport is publicly owned by the county. It is included in the Federal Aviation Administration (FAA) National Plan of Integrated Airport Systems for 2017–2021, in which it is categorized as a local general aviation facility.

The airport has hosted a number of fly-ins, open houses, and attractions to draw locals and visitors to the facilities. The airport has also been a stop for national racing competitions.

== Facilities and aircraft ==
Wexford County Airport covers 441 acres (1.78 km^{2}) and has two runways:

- Runway 7/25: 5,000 x 100 ft (1,524 x 30 m), surface: asphalt
- Runway 18/36: 2,005 x 150 ft (611 x 46 m), surface: turf

For the 12-month period ending December 31, 2020, the airport had roughly 8,030 operations, or roughly 22 per day. This included 98% general aviation, 1% air taxi, and <1% military. For the same time period, 43 aircraft were based on the field: 32 single-engine and 3 multi-engine airplanes as well as 7 gliders and 1 helicopter.

== Accidents and incidents ==
- On June 4, 2020, a single-engine general aviation float plane crashed during takeoff at Wexford County Airport. Authorities believe one of the tires burst while rolling on the runway, causing the plane to lose control and crash into the grass next to the runway.

== See also ==
- List of airports in Michigan
