= Manton, Michigan =

- City
- City of Manton
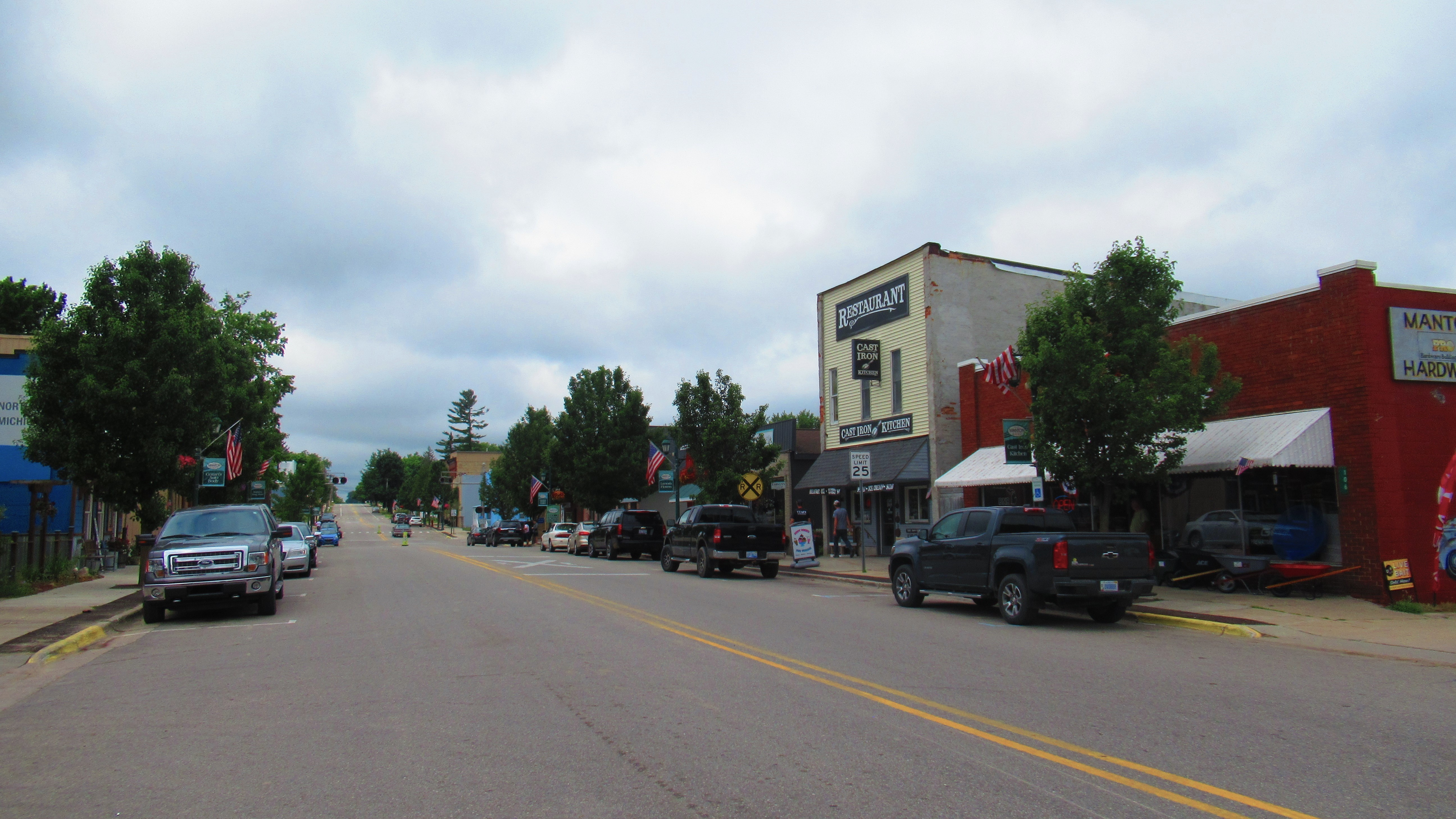
- Looking west along Main Street (Bus. US 131)

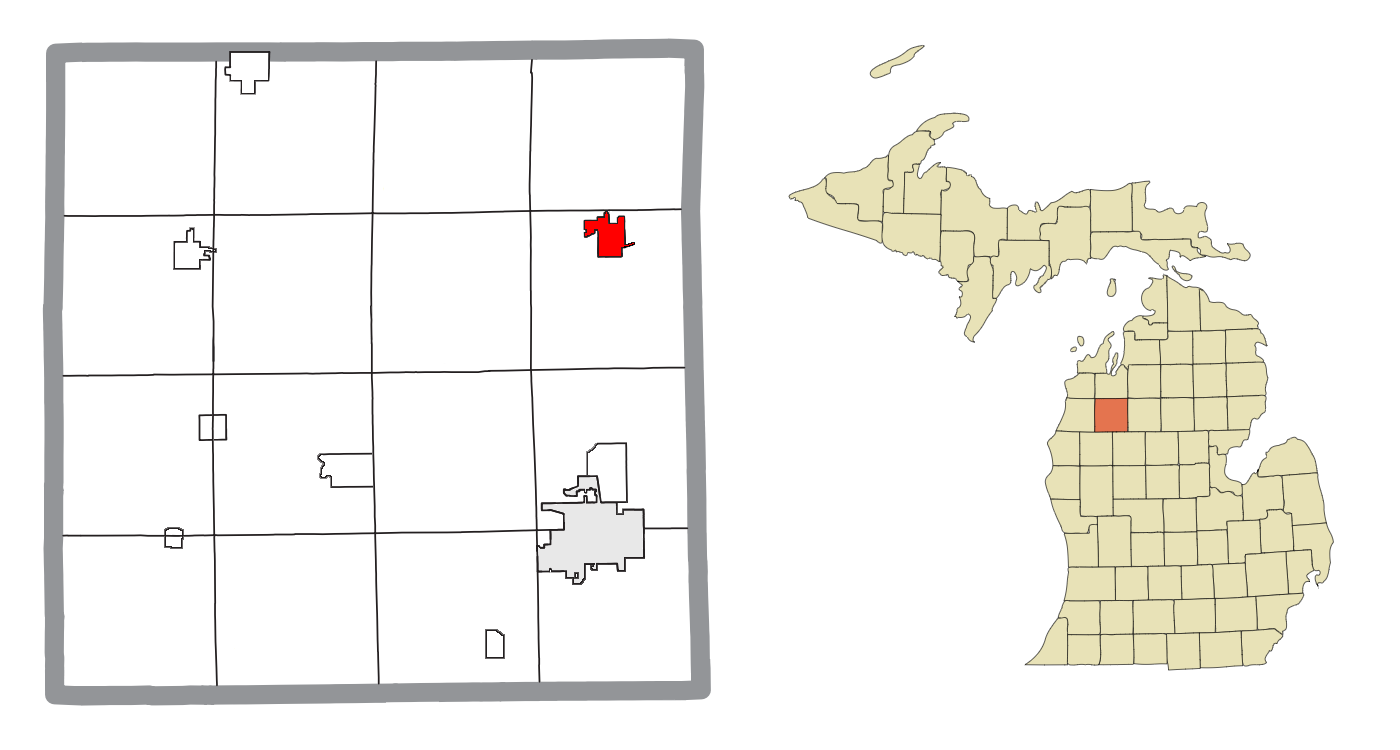
- Location within Wexford County

- Location within the state of Michigan Location within the United States
- Coordinates: 44°24′37″N 85°24′00″W
- Country: United States
- State: Michigan
- County: Wexford
- Settled: 1872
- Incorporated: 1877 (village); 1923 (city)

Government
  - Type: City commission
  - Mayor: Joseph Grzybowski
  - Clerk: Jessica Schisser

Area
  - Total: 1.61 sq mi (4.18 km^{2})
  - Land: 1.56 sq mi (4.04 km^{2})
  - Water: 0.054 sq mi (0.14 km^{2})
- Elevation: 1,132 ft (345 m)

Population (2020)
  - Total: 1,258
  - Density: 805.8/sq mi (311.14/km^{2})
- Time zone: UTC-5 (Eastern (EST))
  - Summer (DST): UTC-4 (EDT)
- ZIP code(s): 49663
- Area code: 231
- FIPS code: 26-50880
- GNIS feature ID: 1620691
- Website: Official website

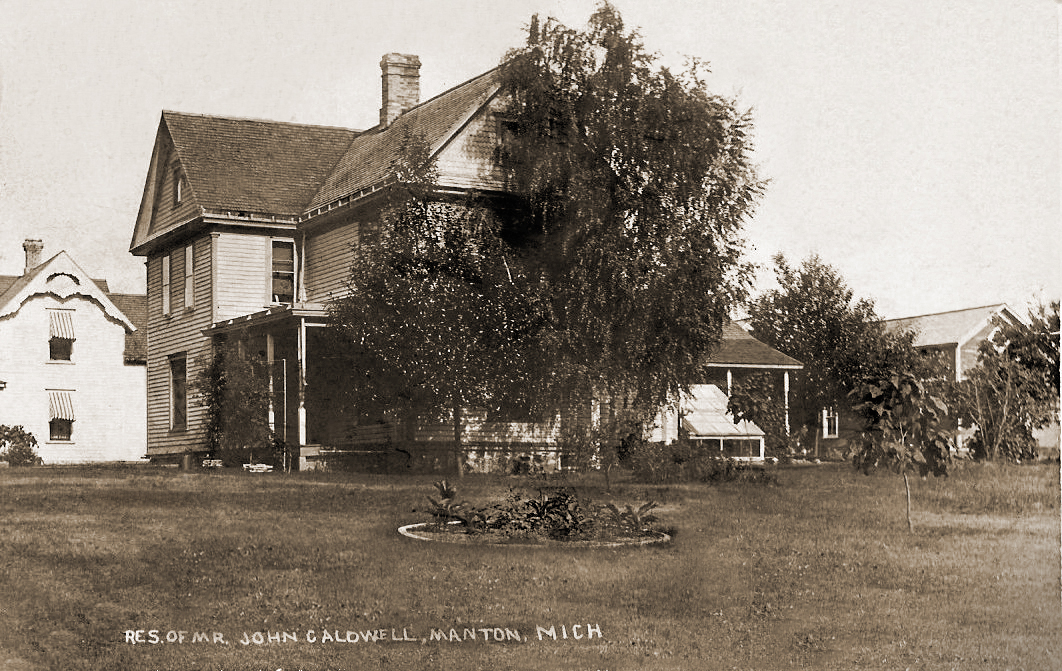
1913 Manton residence of Michigan State Republican Representative John Caldwell.

Manton (/mæn.tən/) is a city in Wexford County in the U.S. state of Michigan. The population was 1,258 at the 2020 census. The city is located in northeastern Wexford County, which itself is part of Northern Michigan.

== History ==
The townsite was purchased and cleared in 1872 along the proposed route of the Grand Rapids and Indiana Railroad, by two local settlers, Ezra Harger and George Manton, and a third partner, William Mears. The place was known locally as Cedar Creek, but the railroad named the new station "Manton" after its first postmaster, George Manton.

Manton was at one time the county seat for Wexford County. However, the county seat was forcibly moved to Cadillac in the Battle of Manton.

=== Amish community ===
In 1993, an Old Order Amish community was started near Manton, most of the members coming from the Evart-LeRoy area or from Vestaburg in Michigan. The community is more open to "seekers" – people who want to join the Amish – than other Old Order Amish communities. They are affiliated with the Amish community in Smyrna, Maine, which was founded as one of the "Christian Communities" under the leadership of Elmo Stoll, but joined the Amish, when the "Christian Communities" disbanded.

== Geography ==
According to the U.S. Census Bureau, the city has a total area of 1.61 square miles (4.17 km^{2}), of which 1.56 square miles (4.04 km^{2}) is land and 0.05 square miles (0.13 km^{2}) (3.11%) is water.

The city of Manton is surrounded by Cedar Creek Township. However, the two municipalities are administered separately.

=== Major highways ===
- US 131 is a freeway that bypasses the city to its east. It has its final freeway exit (exit 191) with M-42 and Bus. US 131 just southeast of the city before becoming a two-lane highway five miles (8.0 km) north of Manton and continuing north to Kalkaska and Petoskey.
- Bus. US 131 is a business loop of US 131 that starts at M-42 and US 131 (exit 191), runs through Manton, and runs out of town for five miles (8.0 km) before meeting the US 131 freeway at a normal intersection.
- M-42 runs concurrently with Bus. US 131 into Manton for a mile before ending at an intersection with 7th Street and Main Street. Bus. US 131 turns north without M-42.

== Demographics ==
Historical population
Census	Pop.	Note	%±
1880	214		—
1890	661		208.9%
1900	895		35.4%
1910	1,069		19.4%
1920	793		−25.8%
1930	1,008		27.1%
1940	1,006		−0.2%
1950	1,085		7.9%
1960	1,050		−3.2%
1970	1,107		5.4%
1980	1,212		9.5%
1990	1,161		−4.2%
2000	1,221		5.2%
2010	1,287		5.4%
2020	1,258		−2.3%
U.S. Decennial Census

=== 2010 census ===
As of the census of 2010, there were 1,287 people, 504 households, and 327 families living in the city. The population density was 825.0 inhabitants per square mile (318.5/km^{2}). There were 577 housing units at an average density of 369.9 per square mile (142.8/km^{2}). The racial makeup of the city was 96.3% White, 0.5% African American, 0.9% Native American, 0.4% from other races, and 1.9% from two or more races. Hispanic or Latino of any race were 2.3% of the population.

There were 504 households, of which 37.3% had children under the age of 18 living with them, 37.1% were married couples living together, 20.8% had a female householder with no husband present, 6.9% had a male householder with no wife present, and 35.1% were non-families. 31.0% of all households were made up of individuals, and 15.9% had someone living alone who was 65 years of age or older. The average household size was 2.54 and the average family size was 3.10.

The median age in the city was 31.9 years. 30% of residents were under the age of 18; 9.9% were between the ages of 18 and 24; 23.3% were from 25 to 44; 22.3% were from 45 to 64; and 14.4% were 65 years of age or older. The gender makeup of the city was 47.5% male and 52.5% female.

=== 2000 census ===
As of the census of 2000, there were 1,221 people, 497 households, and 317 families living in the city. The population density was 784.2 inhabitants per square mile (302.8/km^{2}). There were 541 housing units at an average density of 347.4 per square mile (134.1/km^{2}). The racial makeup of the city was 97.95% White, 0.41% Native American, 0.25% Asian, and 1.39% from two or more races. Hispanic or Latino of any race were 1.15% of the population.

There were 497 households, out of which 31.0% had children under the age of 18 living with them, 44.5% were married couples living together, 15.5% had a female householder with no husband present, and 36.2% were non-families. 28.8% of all households were made up of individuals, and 13.7% had someone living alone who was 65 years of age or older. The average household size was 2.46 and the average family size was 3.04.

In the city, the population was spread out, with 28.9% under the age of 18, 9.3% from 18 to 24, 26.5% from 25 to 44, 20.4% from 45 to 64, and 14.9% who were 65 years of age or older. The median age was 36 years. For every 100 females, there were 90.5 males. For every 100 females age 18 and over, there were 83.1 males.

The median income for a household in the city was $27,339, and the median income for a family was $31,979. Males had a median income of $30,000 versus $21,125 for females. The per capita income for the city was $13,528. About 9.3% of families and 14.2% of the population were below the poverty line, including 12.9% of those under age 18 and 6.8% of those age 65 or over.

== Images ==
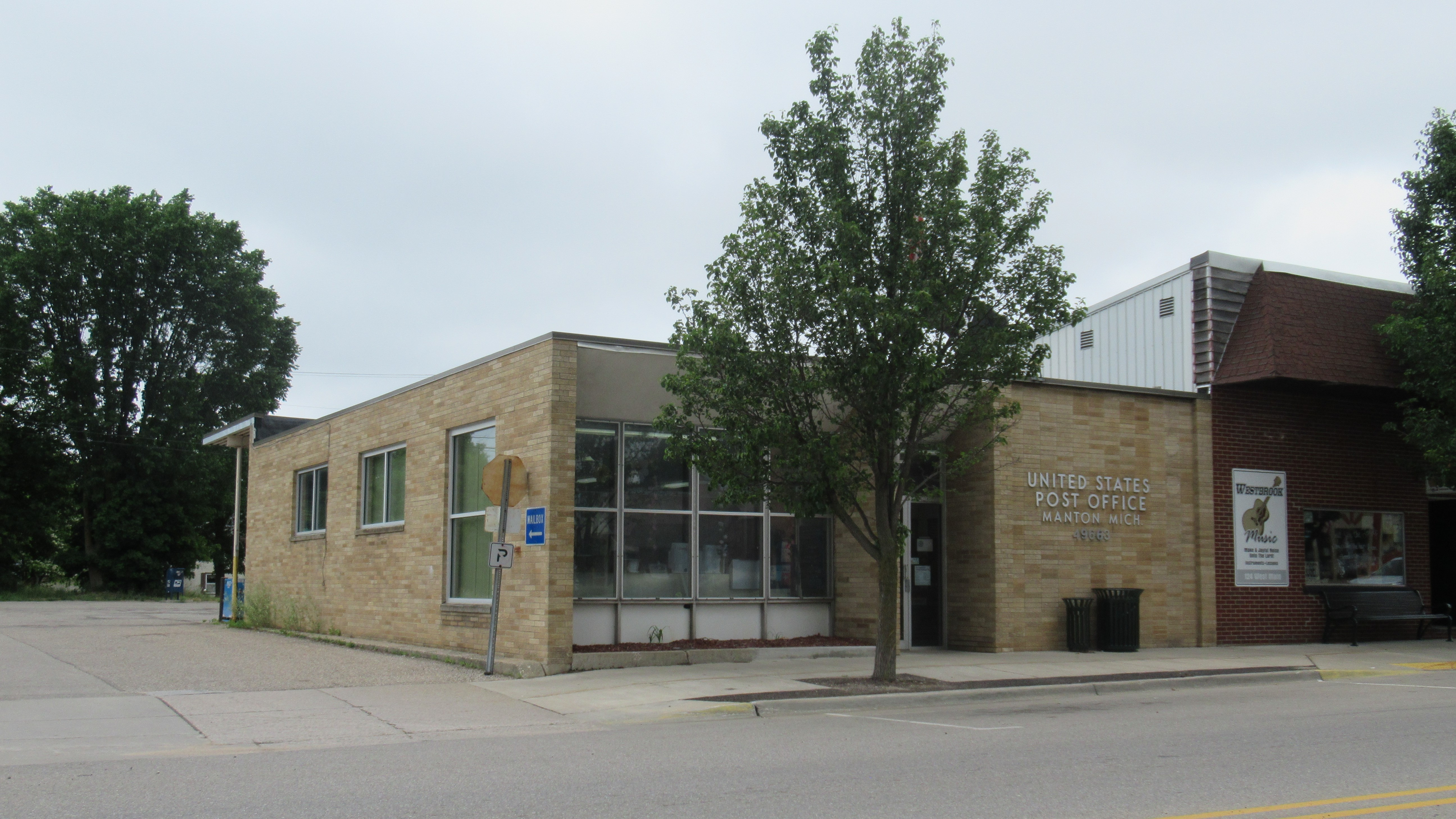
U.S. Post Office in Manton

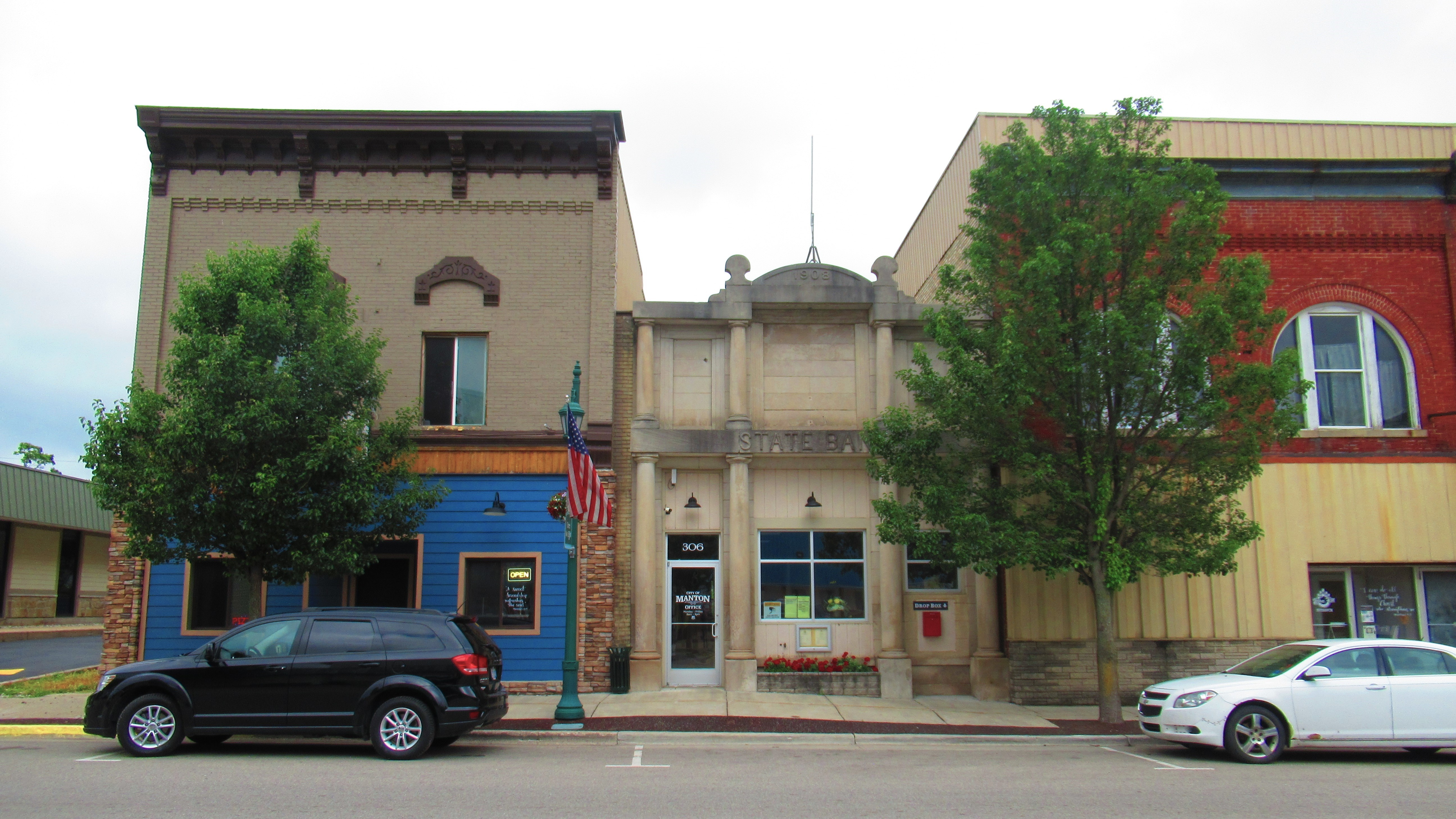
City of Manton Office

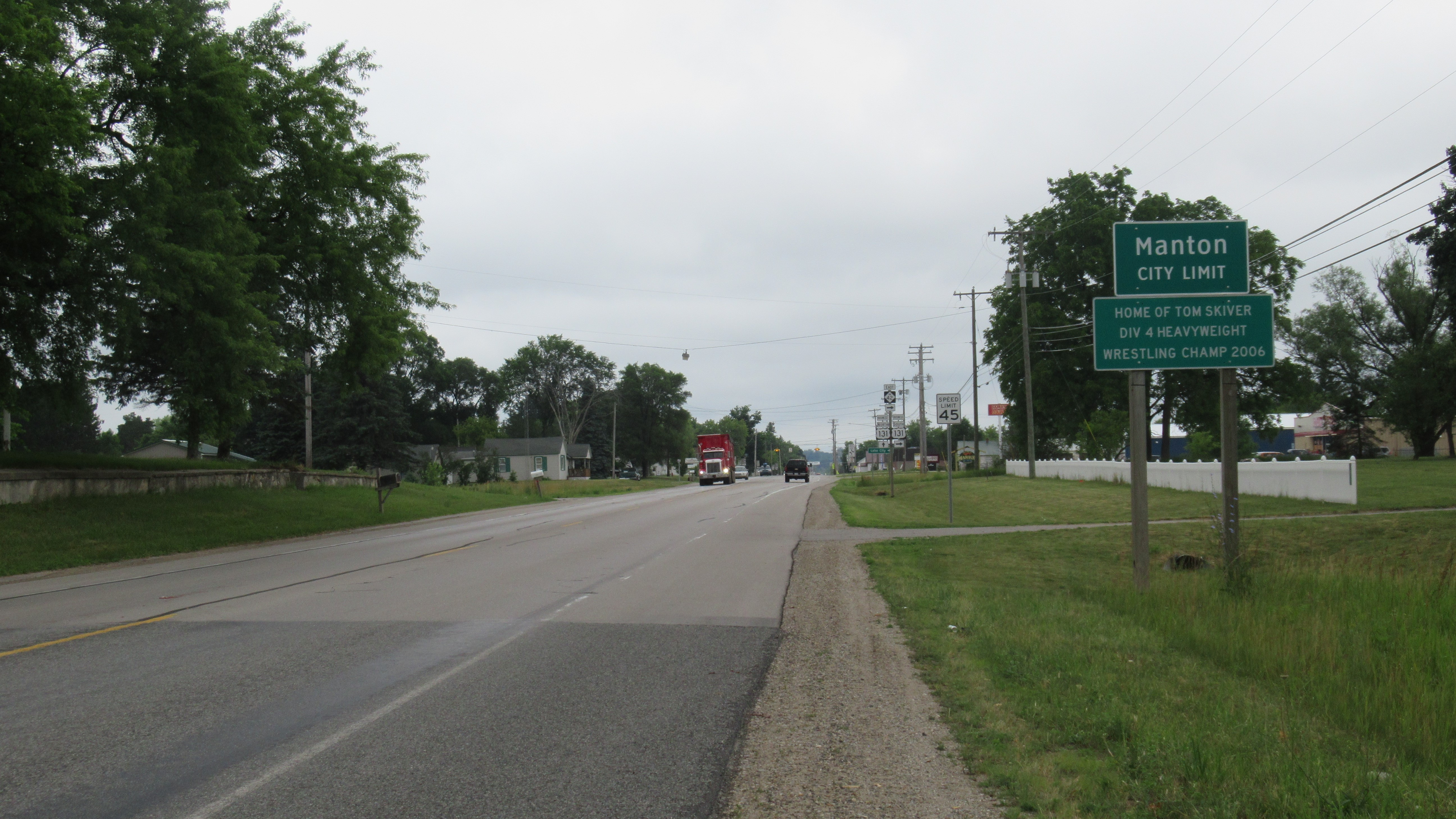
Road signage along Bus. US 131
