= M-42 (Michigan highway) =

State highway in Wexford and Missaukee counties in Michigan, United States

M-42
- M-42 highlighted in red

Route information
- Maintained by MDOT
- Length: 10.339 mi (16.639 km)
- Existed: c. July 1, 1919–present

Major junctions
- West end: Bus. US 131 in Manton
- US 131 in Manton
- East end: M-66 near Lake City

Location
- Country: United States
- State: Michigan
- Counties: Wexford, Missaukee

Highway system
- Michigan State Trunkline Highway System; Interstate; US; State; Byways
← M-41	→ M-43

M-42 is a rural state trunkline highway in the U.S. state of Michigan. It is located in the northwestern Lower Peninsula of the state. Along its route, M-42 begins in Manton and ends north of Lake City, some 10.356 miles (16.666 km) apart. The highway used to run much farther. Former termini included the Traverse City area from 1919 until 1940 and Mesick from 1940 until 2007.

== Route description ==
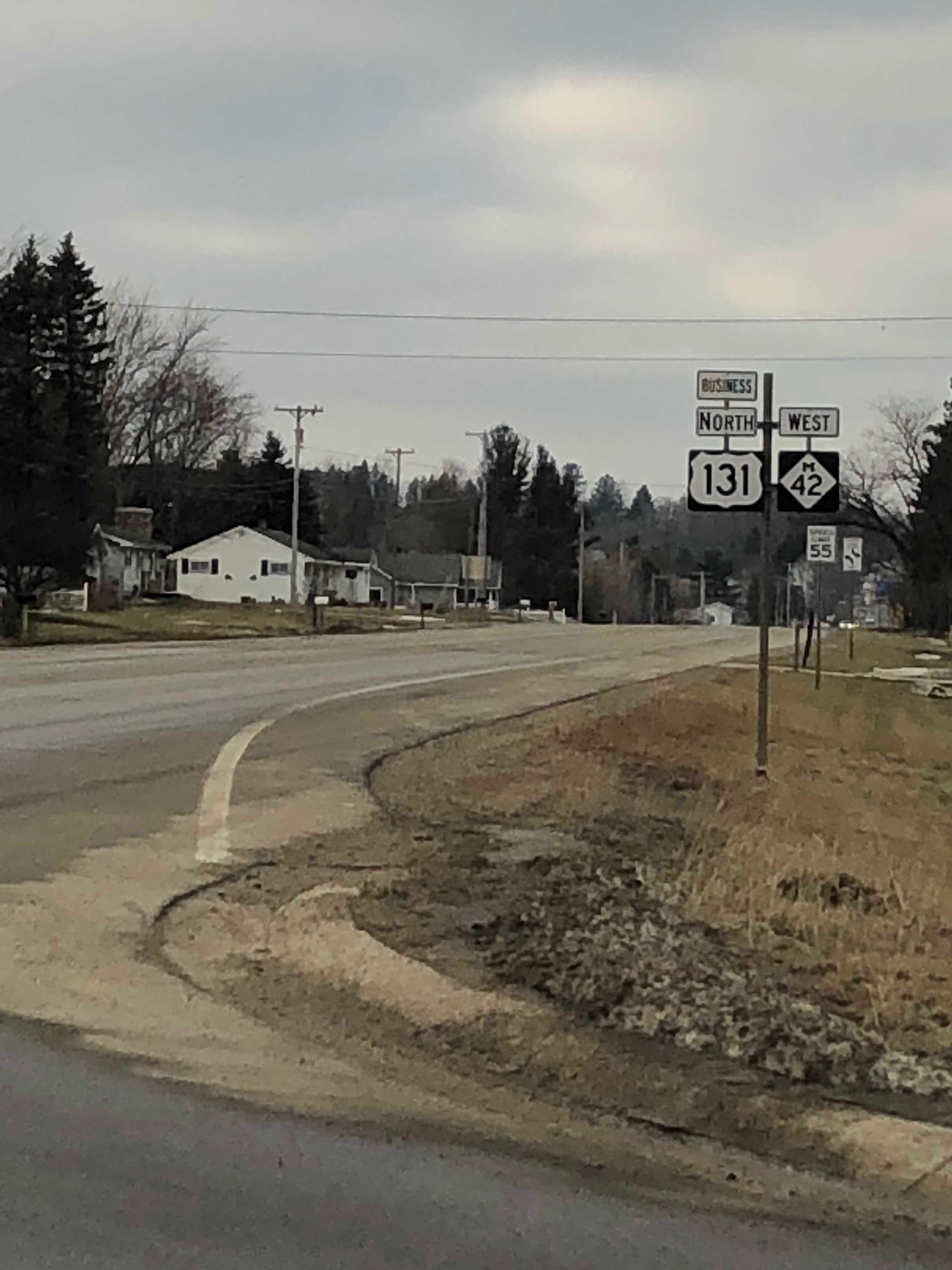
M-42 cosigned with Bus. US 131 just west of the interchange with US 131 at Manton

M-42 is a rural, two-lane highway connecting Manton and Lake City. It runs through wooded terrain on gently rolling hills. Between the western terminus at Michigan Avenue and the US Highway 131 (US 131) freeway in Manton, M-42 runs concurrently Bus. US 131 along Seventh Street. It runs east along Seventh Street to a folded diamond interchange at exit 191 on US 131 east of downtown. Continuing east, it is known as North 16 1/2 Road until it crosses the Wexford–Missaukee county line at Seeley Road approximately 2.5 miles (4.0 km) east of the freeway. Here the road name changes to Mike and Tony Road before M-42 curves southeasterly crossing Morrisy Creek on West Walker Road. East of the unincorporated community of Arlene the highway turns ninety degrees to the south off Walker Road before angling southeasterly skirting the edge of some hills near Dyer Lake just west of M-66. The road turns back due east between Al Moses Road and M-66, where it ends north of Lake City. No section of the trunkline is part of the National Highway System.

== History ==
M-42 is an original state trunkline dating back to the 1919 signage of the highway system in Michigan. The original highway routing started at M-13 in Manton and ran due west to Mesick. From there the highway turned north and met M-11 at Chums Corners. M-11/M-42 ran concurrently northward into the City of Traverse City where M-42 ended. By May 1929, M-42 was extended east to connect to Lake City. The highway was further extended before 1936 up the Old Mission Peninsula north of Traverse City. In the latter half of 1940, the M-37 designation replaced M-42 north of Mesick through Traverse City to Old Mission. The last sections of highway were paved in late 1951 and early 1952.

In 2007, the stretch of M-42 between M-37 and US 131 along 16 Road was transferred to the Wexford County Road Commission. This change shortened the highway from 25.255 miles (40.644 km) to 10.356 miles (16.666 km). The section of transferred highway in Wexford County was labeled as "flexible pavements" on the 2006 MDOT Truck Operators Map. This classification meant truck traffic on the roadway was subject to weight and load restrictions during spring. This classification is unlike the other highways in the county and surrounding area which were marked as "all-weather highways" and would not carry such restrictions.

== Major intersections ==
County	Location	mi	km	Destinations	Notes
Wexford	Manton	0.000	0.000	Bus. US 131 north	Western terminus; western end of Bus. US 131 concurrency
Wexford	Manton	0.842	1.355	US 131 / Bus. US 131 – Petoskey, Cadillac	Exit 191 on US 131; southern terminus of Bus. US 131
Missaukee	Lake City	10.339	16.639	M-66 – Kalkaska, Lake City	
1.000 mi = 1.609 km; 1.000 km = 0.621 mi: Concurrency terminus
