= Rutland Charter Township, Michigan =

- Charter township
- Location within the state of Michigan
- Coordinates: 42°38′58″N 85°21′5″W
- Country: United States
- State: Michigan
- County: Barry

Area
  - Total: 36.1 sq mi (93.6 km^{2})
  - Land: 35.0 sq mi (90.7 km^{2})
  - Water: 1.1 sq mi (2.9 km^{2})
- Elevation: 817 ft (249 m)

Population (2020)
  - Total: 4,136
  - Density: 118/sq mi (45.6/km^{2})
- Time zone: UTC-5 (Eastern (EST))
  - Summer (DST): UTC-4 (EDT)
- FIPS code: 26-70420
- GNIS feature ID: 1627018
- Website: www.rutlandtownship.org

Rutland Charter Township is a charter township of Barry County in the U.S. state of Michigan. The population was 4,136 at the 2020 census.

== Geography ==
According to the United States Census Bureau, the township has a total area of 36.1 square miles (93.6 km^{2}), of which 35.0 square miles (90.7 km^{2}) is land and 1.1 square miles (2.9 km^{2}), or 3.06%, is water.

== Communities ==
- Glass Creek was the name of a post office here from 1849 until 1864.

== Demographics ==
As of the census of 2000, there were 3,646 people, 1,341 households, and 1,059 families residing in the township. The population density was 103.6 inhabitants per square mile (40.0/km^{2}). There were 1,434 housing units at an average density of 40.8 per square mile (15.8/km^{2}). The racial makeup of the township was 97.59% White, 0.22% African American, 0.44% Native American, 0.36% Asian, 0.44% from other races, and 0.96% from two or more races. Hispanic or Latino of any race were 1.59% of the population.

There were 1,341 households, out of which 35.6% had children under the age of 18 living with them, 67.3% were married couples living together, 6.3% had a female householder with no husband present, and 21.0% were non-families. 17.0% of all households were made up of individuals, and 6.3% had someone living alone who was 65 years of age or older. The average household size was 2.72 and the average family size was 3.03.

In the township the population was spread out, with 27.1% under the age of 18, 7.0% from 18 to 24, 28.8% from 25 to 44, 25.6% from 45 to 64, and 11.6% who were 65 years of age or older. The median age was 37 years. For every 100 females, there were 103.0 males. For every 100 females age 18 and over, there were 103.0 males.

The median income for a household in the township was $52,065, and the median income for a family was $59,291. Males had a median income of $40,132 versus $27,059 for females. The per capita income for the township was $23,141. About 3.3% of families and 3.9% of the population were below the poverty line, including 3.1% of those under age 18 and 13.0% of those age 65 or over.
