= Hastings Area School System =

School district in Michigan

Address
- 232 W Grand St. Hastings, Barry, Michigan, 49058; United States

District information
- Grades: Pre-Kindergarten-12
- Superintendent: Dr. Nick Damico
- Schools: 6
- Budget: $38,763,000 2022-2023 expenditures
- NCES District ID: 2617970

Students and staff
- Students: 2,481 (2024-2025)
- Teachers: 150.98 (on an FTE basis) (2024-2025)
- Staff: 343.76 FTE (2024-2025)
- Student–teacher ratio: 16.43 (2024-2025)

Other information
- Website: www.hassk12.org

Hastings Area School System is a public school district in West Michigan. In Barry County, it serves Hastings and parts of the townships of Assyria, Baltimore, Castleton, Carlton, Hastings, Hope, Johnstown, Irving, Maple Grove, Rutland, and Woodland. It also serves part of Bedford Township in Calhoun County.

== History ==
A Union School was built in Hastings in 1852. A fire destroyed the building in 1871, and temporary classrooms were used until its replacement opened in 1877. That year, the first class graduated from Hastings High School.

A new high school building was built in 1917. The architect was E. Leroy of Kalamazoo. Its gymnasium was added in 1955. The building is now used as the middle school. As part of the construction bond issue passed in 2015, the 1917 section of the building was torn down and rebuilt.

Central School, now called Central Elementary, incorporated some bricks from the 1877 school when it was built in 1931. Warren Holmes was the architect of Central Elementary, which includes a 1,136-seat auditorium.

Northeastern and Southeastern Elementary Schools were built in 1953.

The current Hastings High School building was completed in 1970. Star Elementary was built in 1997.

== Schools ==
Schools in Hastings Area School System
| School | Address | Notes |
|---|---|---|
| Hastings High School | 520 West South St., Hastings | Grades 9–12. |
| Hastings Middle School | 232 W. Grand Street, Hastings | Grades 6–8. |
| Central Elementary | 509 S. Broadway, Hastings | Grades PreK-5. |
| Northeastern Elementary | 519 E Grant St., Hastings | Grades PreK-5. |
| Southeastern Elementary | 1300 S East St., Hastings | Grades K-5. |
| Star Elementary | 1900 Star School Rd., Hastings | Grades K-5. |
