= List of Michigan State Historic Sites in Barry County =

Location of Barry County in Michigan

The following is a list of Michigan State Historic Sites in Barry County, Michigan. Sites marked with a dagger (†) are also listed on the National Register of Historic Places in Barry County, Michigan.

== Current listings ==
Name	Image	Location	City	Listing date
Barry County Courthouse†		220 West State Street, SE corner of Broadway	Hastings	February 28, 1969
Barryville Informational Designation	Barryville Informational Site	6043 Scott Road	Barryville	November 6, 1970
Bowen's Mills	Bowen Mills	Brigg's Rd, 2 miles north of Chief Noonday Rd	Yankee Springs Township	February 11, 1972
Carlton Township Hall	Carlton Township Hall	M-43, west of M-66	Hastings	August 3, 1979
John Carveth House†	John Carveth House	614 West Main Street	Middleville	December 17, 1992
Central Elementary School and Auditorium	Central Elementary School	509 South Broadway	Hastings	April 18, 1991
Chicago, Kalamazoo and Saginaw Railroad-(demolished)		307 E Green St	Hastings	February 11, 1972
William Colby House	William Colby House	5011 Whitneyville Road at Crane Road	Middleville	March 19, 1992
Austin H. and Frankie A. Dwight Summer House† (demolished)		11456 Marsh Road	Shelbyville	June 18, 1982
Hastings Mutual Insurance Company Informational Designation	Hastings Mutual Insurance Co	404 East Woodlawn Avenue	Hastings	June 15, 1984
Hastings Railroad Depot	Hastings Railroad Depot	222 West Apple Street, NW corner of Church Street	Hastings	July 26, 1974
Robert I. Hendershott Block	Robert Hendershott Block	119 West State Street	Hastings	September 24, 1984
Hinds School	Hinds School	Brogan and Cedar Creek Roads	Hope Township	January 27, 1983
Indian Landing - Charlton Park	Charlton Park	Charlton Park, 2545 S Charlton Park Rd, SW NW Sec. 25, T3N, R8W	Hastings Township	March 14, 1973
George W. Lowry House	George Lowry House	126 South Broadway	Hastings	September 8, 1982
Marshall Farm House and Barns	Marshall Farm Barns	2530 Hickory Road	Delton	November 16, 1995
Archie McCoy Block	Archie McCoy Block	117 West State Street	Hastings	September 24, 1984
McKeown Road Bridge	McKeown Road Bridge	McKeown Road over the Thornapple River	Hastings	July 17, 1997
Methodist Episcopal Church (Christ the King Presbyterian Church)	Methodist Episcopal Church	300 Jefferson	Hastings	April 19, 1995
Moreau's Trading Post Informational Designation		Chief Noonday Road	Irving vicinity	August 23, 1956
Albert W. Olds House	Albert Olds House	434 Main Street	Nashville	July 23, 1987
Parmelee United Methodist Church	Parmelee United Methodist Church	Parmelee Road, east of Stimson	Middleville	January 22, 1987
Putnam Public Library	Charles Putman House	327 North Main Street	Nashville	April 21, 1980
Saint Cyril's Catholic Church	Saint Cyril's Catholic Church	203 North State Street	Nashville	April 29, 1982
Scales' Prairie	Scales Prairie	Corner of Adams and Norris roads, west of M-37	Thornapple Township	February 11, 1972
Governor Kim Sigler Informational Designation	Governor Kim Sigler	220 West State Street	Hastings	January 22, 1987
Daniel Striker House†	Daniel Stryler House	321 South Jefferson Street	Hastings	November 6, 1970
Thomas' Mills-(demolished)		15469 M-43, Hickory Corners, MI 49060	Prairieville Township	November 6, 1970
Woodland Township Hall	Woodland Township Hall	SW corner of East Broadway (M-43) and State Street	Woodland Township	August 22, 1981
Yankee Springs Inn (demolished)		Yankee Springs Road, 1/4 mile north of Duffy Rd	Yankee Springs Township	September 17, 1957

== See also ==
- National Register of Historic Places listings in Barry County, Michigan

== Sources ==
- Historic Sites Online – Barry County. Michigan State Housing Developmental Authority. Accessed January 23, 2011.
