= Delton Kellogg Schools =

School district in Michigan, United States

Address
- 327 N. Grove Street Delton, Barry County, Michigan, 49046; United States

District information
- Grades: Pre-Kindergarten - 12
- Superintendent: Dr. Jeremy Wright
- Schools: 4
- Budget: $23,863,000 2022-2023 expenditures
- NCES District ID: 2611910

Students and staff
- Students: 1,111 (2024-2025)
- Teachers: 66.58 (on an FTE basis) (2024-2025)
- Staff: 164.53 FTE (2024-2025)
- Student–teacher ratio: 16.69 (2024-2025)

Other information
- Website: www.dkschools.org

Delton Kellogg Schools is a public school district in West Michigan. In Barry County, it serves parts of the townships of Baltimore, Barry, Hope, Johnstown, Orangeville, and Prairieville. It also serves part of Gunplain Township in Allegan County.

== History ==
A new Delton Kellogg Agricultural School (as it was originally known) opened in fall 1936 in the village of Delton. The next building to serve as the Delton Kellogg High School opened in fall 1960. The current high school opened in fall 1974. The high school's architect was Daverman Associates of Grand Rapids.

== Schools ==
Delton Kellogg's schools share a campus north of the village of Delton.

Schools in Delton Kellogg Schools district
School	Address	Notes
Delton Kellogg High School	10425 Panther Pride, Delton	Grades 9–12. Built 1974.
Delton Kellogg Middle School	6325 Delton Rd., Delton	Grades 5–8
Delton Kellogg Elementary	327 N. Grove St., Delton	Grades PreK-4
DK Academy	10425 Panther Pride, Delton	Online high school
