= Gull Lake Community Schools =

School district in Michigan, USA

Address
- 10100 E D Ave. Richland, Kalamazoo, Michigan, 49083; United States

District information
- Grades: Pre-Kindergarten-12
- Superintendent: Christopher L. Rundle
- Schools: 7
- Budget: $56,373,000 2022-2023 expenditures
- NCES District ID: 2617250

Students and staff
- Students: 3,412 (2024-2025)
- Teachers: 222.43 (on an FTE basis) (2024-2025)
- Staff: 525.25 FTE (2024-2025)
- Student–teacher ratio: 15.34 (2024-2025)

Other information
- Website: www.gulllakecs.org

Gull Lake Community Schools is a public school district near Kalamazoo, Michigan. In Kalamazoo County, it serves Richland and Richland Township, South Gull Lake and parts of Charleston Township, Comstock Township, Cooper Township, and Ross Township. In Barry County, it serves parts of the townships of Barry, Johnstown, and Prairieville, and in Calhoun County, it serves part of Bedford Township.

== History ==
In 1962, the school districts of East Cooper, Kellogg, Richland, and Yorkville merged. The new district was named for Gull Lake, which united the interests of the area.

Two high schools in the merged districts continue to be used by the district for different purposes. Richland High School opened in fall, 1957. It replaced a building built around 1924, when the Richland district's teachers were students at what is now Western Michigan University. Kellogg Agricultural High School was built in 1929. Kellogg Elementary was added to it in 1953.

In the fall of 1965, Kellogg Agricultural High School became Gull Lake High School and Richland High School became Gull Lake Junior High. Students from those schools had voted for the Blue Devils to be the mascot of their combined high school.

In fall of 1970, a renovation and expansion was completed at the district's junior high school (the former Richland High School) to turn it back into the high school for grades nine through twelve. The former high school (Kellogg) became the middle school.

The present Gull Lake High School, designed by the architecture firm Kingscott Associates, opened in fall 2007. The former high school (originally Richland High) became the district's middle school. In April of 2022, an 880-seat auditorium addition opened at the high school.

== Schools ==
Schools in Gull Lake Community Schools District
School	Address	Notes
Gull Lake High School	7753 N. 34th Street, Richland	Grades 9-12
Gull Lake Middle School	9550 East M-89, Richland	Grades 6-8
Kellogg Elementary	9594 N 40th St., Hickory Corners	Grades PreK-2
Richland Elementary	9476 East M-89, Richland	Grades PreK-2
Thomas M. Ryan Intermediate	9562 East M-89, Richland	Grades 3-5
Gateway Academy	10100 East D Avenue, Richland	Alternative high school. Grades 9-12.
