= Mud Lake (Michigan) =

Lake in the state of Michigan, United States

Mud Lake is the current or former name of over 300 lakes within the U.S. state of Michigan.

Name	County*	State	Coord	Elevation	GNIS ID	Notes
Mud Lake	Alger County	MI	46°23′48″N 086°42′06″W	748 feet (228 m)	1622244	Munising
Blueberry Lake	Allegan County	MI	42°29′35″N 085°56′35″W	699 feet (213 m)	1617062	Allegan
Huckleberry Lake	Allegan County	MI	42°45′27″N 085°38′17″W	787 feet (240 m)	628760	Moline
Mud Lake	Allegan County	MI	42°32′04″N 086°01′51″W	669 feet (204 m)	632930	Pearl
Mud Lake	Allegan County	MI	42°26′47″N 085°58′41″W	679 feet (207 m)	632922	Chicora, Cheshire Center
Mud Lake	Allegan County	MI	42°38′11″N 085°36′22″W	764 feet (233 m)	632936	Bradley
Mud Lake	Alpena County	MI	45°03′51″N 083°21′40″W	587 feet (179 m)	633008	Alpena
Mud Lake	Alpena County	MI	45°02′39″N 083°28′56″W	617 feet (188 m)	633007	Alpena
Mud Lake	Antrim County	MI	44°58′27″N 085°21′01″W	666 feet (203 m)	633005	Kewadin
Mud Lake	Antrim County	MI	45°10′43″N 085°18′39″W	725 feet (221 m)	633012	Ellsworth
Mud Lake	Antrim County	MI	45°05′13″N 085°08′49″W	807 feet (246 m)	633009	East Jordan
Mud Lake	Antrim County	MI	45°01′21″N 085°10′30″W	827 feet (252 m)	633006	Bellaire
Mud Lake	Antrim County	MI	44°53′45″N 085°09′15″W	892 feet (272 m)	633003	Mancelona
Mud Lake	Arenac County	MI	44°04′24″N 083°44′28″W	594 feet (181 m)	632982	Au Gres
Mogans Lake	Baraga County	MI	46°29′46″N 088°22′23″W	1,673 feet (510 m)	1618849	Covington, Nestoria
Chief Noonday Lake	Barry County	MI	42°38′30″N 085°30′26″W	741 feet (226 m)	623189	Hastings
Mud Lake	Barry County	MI	42°26′35″N 085°11′39″W	883 feet (269 m)	632921	Bedford
Mud Lake	Barry County	MI	42°32′31″N 085°15′57″W	899 feet (274 m)	632932	Dowling
Mud Lake	Barry County	MI	42°32′05″N 085°23′20″W	925 feet (282 m)	2109230	Cloverdale
Mud Lake	Barry County	MI	42°28′53″N 085°23′22″W	925 feet (282 m)	632924	Delton
Mud Lake	Barry County	MI	42°29′12″N 085°16′11″W	925 feet (282 m)	632925	Dowling
Mud Lake	Benzie County	MI	44°43′05″N 086°07′49″W	584 feet (178 m)	633001	Frankfort, Sleeping Bear Dunes National Lakeshore
Mud Lake	Benzie County	MI	44°42′15″N 085°50′12″W	791 feet (241 m)	632999	Lake Ann
Mud Lake	Berrien County	MI	42°12′36″N 086°14′46″W	620 feet (190 m)	2377474	Watervliet
Mud Lake	Berrien County	MI	42°01′02″N 086°17′22″W	702 feet (214 m)	632894	Eau Claire
Mud Lake	Berrien County	MI	41°53′46″N 086°13′46″W	705 feet (215 m)	632893	Niles
Mud Lake	Berrien County	MI	41°49′45″N 086°25′57″W	722 feet (220 m)	1618925	Buchanan, Mud Lake Bog Nature Preserve
Byers Lake	Branch County	MI	41°52′02″N 085°02′12″W	968 feet (295 m)	632892	Lockwood
Calhoon Lake	Branch County	MI	41°47′25″N 085°10′55″W	945 feet (288 m)	622458	Gilead
Loon Lake	Branch County	MI	41°51′58″N 084°56′48″W	984 feet (300 m)	2568902	
Mud Lake	Branch County	MI	41°48′27″N 085°15′48″W	896 feet (273 m)	632887	Burr Oak
Royer Lake	Branch County	MI	41°47′35″N 085°16′36″W	889 feet (271 m)	636355	
Wright Lake	Branch County	MI	41°51′45″N 084°57′04″W	984 feet (300 m)	632891	Crystal Beach
Mud Lake	Calhoun County	MI	42°22′57″N 085°07′13″W	827 feet (252 m)	632916	Pennfield
Mud Lake	Calhoun County	MI	42°25′05″N 085°01′56″W	840 feet (260 m)	632920	Bellevue
Mud Lake	Calhoun County	MI	42°17′29″N 085°08′39″W	843 feet (257 m)	632910	Battle Creek
Mud Lake	Calhoun County	MI	42°19′20″N 085°03′47″W	899 feet (274 m)	632913	Marshall
Mud Lake	Calhoun County	MI	42°18′29″N 085°02′53″W	906 feet (276 m)	632912	Marshall
Mud Lake	Calhoun County	MI	42°14′13″N 085°14′13″W	925 feet (282 m)	632907	Battle Creek
Mud Lake	Calhoun County	MI	42°13′33″N 084°57′17″W	928 feet (283 m)	632906	Marshall
Mud Lake	Cass County	MI	41°55′31″N 086°05′02″W	794 feet (242 m)	2109393	Cassopolis
Mud Lake	Cass County	MI	41°47′37″N 085°54′38″W	820 feet (250 m)	632886	Union
Mud Lake	Cass County	MI	42°03′08″N 085°49′18″W	889 feet (271 m)	632895	Marcellus
Little Mud Lake	Charlevoix County	MI	45°12′29″N 085°10′05″W	663 feet (202 m)	630699	Ironton
Mud Lake	Charlevoix County	MI	45°13′00″N 085°05′22″W	617 feet (188 m)	633015	Advance
Mud Lake	Charlevoix County	MI	45°20′05″N 085°10′00″W	676 feet (206 m)	633019	Charlevoix
Mud Lake	Charlevoix County	MI	45°15′17″N 084°59′46″W	758 feet (231 m)	633017	Boyne City
Mud Lake	Charlevoix County	MI	45°09′45″N 085°02′49″W	774 feet (236 m)	633010	Boyne City, East Jordan
Mud Lakes	Charlevoix County	MI	45°07′30″N 084°48′15″W	1,171 feet (357 m)	1623153	Elmira
Lake Marina	Cheboygan County	MI	45°25′58″N 084°36′06″W	594 feet (181 m)	631556	
Mud Lake	Cheboygan County	MI	45°29′28″N 084°19′49″W	614 feet (187 m)	633023	
Mud Lake	Cheboygan County	MI	45°26′54″N 084°18′18″W	617 feet (188 m)	633022	
Mud Lake	Cheboygan County	MI	45°36′41″N 084°21′32″W	715 feet (218 m)	633025	
Mud Lake	Cheboygan County	MI	45°39′57″N 084°41′00″W	718 feet (219 m)	633026	
Mud Lake	Cheboygan County	MI	45°36′31″N 084°35′56″W	735 feet (224 m)	633024	
Mud Lake	Cheboygan County	MI	45°13′59″N 084°36′31″W	810 feet (250 m)	633016	
Little Mud Lake	Chippewa County	MI	46°18′56″N 085°06′24″W	804 feet (245 m)	1620570	
Mud Lake	Chippewa County	MI	46°16′37″N 084°30′07″W	735 feet (224 m)	633038	
Mud Lake	Chippewa County	MI	46°19′09″N 085°05′54″W	804 feet (245 m)	633041	
Mud Lake	Chippewa County	MI	46°10′25″N 085°01′43″W	823 feet (251 m)	1620943	
Munuscong Lake	Chippewa County	MI	46°12′00″N 084°10′00″W	581 feet (177 m)	633135	
Ziegler Lake	Chippewa County	MI	46°00′36″N 084°05′42″W	696 feet (212 m)	1616927	
Bertha Lake	Clare County	MI	43°55′59″N 084°53′32″W	1,089 feet (332 m)	621179	
Big Mud Lake	Clare County	MI	43°54′03″N 085°04′39″W	1,033 feet (315 m)	621338	
Gray Lake	Clare County	MI	43°49′41″N 085°00′57″W	1,060 feet (320 m)	627421	
Mud Lake	Clare County	MI	43°54′08″N 084°39′10″W	797 feet (243 m)	632976	
Mud Lake	Clare County	MI	44°07′54″N 084°46′12″W	1,115 feet (340 m)	632984	
Mud Lake	Clare County	MI	44°00′00″N 084°57′02″W	1,148 feet (350 m)	633071	
Mud Lake	Clinton County	MI	42°52′59″N 084°44′11″W	761 feet (232 m)	632950	
Mud Lake	Clinton County	MI	42°54′20″N 084°29′12″W	817 feet (249 m)	632951	
Mud Lake	Clinton County	MI	42°47′26″N 084°24′18″W	837 feet (255 m)	632942	
Mud Lake	Crawford County	MI	44°32′22″N 084°38′54″W	1,148 feet (350 m)	632995	
Cache Lake	Delta County	MI	45°59′54″N 086°40′36″W	732 feet (223 m)	1619392	
Granskog Lake	Delta County	MI	45°43′57″N 086°51′50″W	591 feet (180 m)	1620057	
Mud Lake	Delta County	MI	45°41′06″N 086°40′45″W	594 feet (181 m)	633027	
Mud Lake	Delta County	MI	46°06′14″N 086°56′20″W	781 feet (238 m)	633035	
Van Winkle Lake	Delta County	MI	46°03′23″N 086°34′04″W	745 feet (227 m)	1622016	
Little Mud Lake	Dickinson County	MI	46°09′51″N 087°49′56″W	1,260 feet (380 m)	630701	
Mud Lake	Dickinson County	MI	45°48′55″N 088°04′30″W	1,112 feet (339 m)	633028	
Mud Lake	Dickinson County	MI	46°05′02″N 087°50′29″W	1,201 feet (366 m)	2098022	
Mud Lake	Dickinson County	MI	46°10′11″N 087°51′03″W	1,253 feet (382 m)	633037	
West Mud Lake	Dickinson County	MI	45°48′58″N 088°04′44″W	1,115 feet (340 m)	2127816	
Mud Lake	Eaton County	MI	42°43′11″N 085°04′14″W	827 feet (252 m)	632940	
Mud Lake	Eaton County	MI	42°45′01″N 085°02′21″W	830 feet (250 m)	633067	
Mud Lake	Eaton County	MI	42°30′59″N 085°01′30″W	922 feet (281 m)	632928	
Southward Lake	Eaton County	MI	42°27′34″N 084°49′19″W	899 feet (274 m)	632923	
Mud Lake	Emmet County	MI	45°23′45″N 084°54′06″W	600 feet (180 m)	633021	
Crane Lake	Genesee County	MI	42°50′13″N 083°44′31″W	869 feet (265 m)	624010	
Mud Lake	Genesee County	MI	42°48′15″N 083°54′14″W	840 feet (260 m)	632944	
Mud Lake	Genesee County	MI	42°50′58″N 083°48′45″W	843 feet (257 m)	632947	
Mud Lake	Genesee County	MI	42°49′20″N 083°51′22″W	856 feet (261 m)	632946	
Lake Lochbrae	Gladwin County	MI	44°06′08″N 084°29′37″W	883 feet (269 m)	630849	
Mud Lake	Gladwin County	MI	44°08′57″N 084°21′48″W	833 feet (254 m)	632985	
Mud Lake	Gladwin County	MI	44°02′26″N 084°33′06″W	846 feet (258 m)	632981	
Barb Lake	Gogebic County	MI	46°19′38″N 089°35′21″W	1,545 feet (471 m)	1619089	
Cup Lake	Gogebic County	MI	46°22′50″N 089°29′38″W	1,535 feet (468 m)	624219	
Dream Lake	Gogebic County	MI	46°12′22″N 089°22′32″W	1,686 feet (514 m)	1619762	
Gudegast Lake	Gogebic County	MI	46°10′08″N 089°09′27″W	1,699 feet (518 m)	1620094	
Mule Lake	Gogebic County	MI	46°13′07″N 089°23′12″W	1,699 feet (518 m)	1620948	
Record Lake	Gogebic County	MI	46°15′08″N 089°23′20″W	1,683 feet (513 m)	1621353	
Lake Dubonnet	Grand Traverse County	MI	44°41′11″N 085°47′22″W	840 feet (260 m)	624912	
Mud Lake	Grand Traverse County	MI	44°38′37″N 085°45′28″W	833 feet (254 m)	632997	
Mud Lake	Grand Traverse County	MI	44°34′28″N 085°47′57″W	833 feet (254 m)	632996	
Mud Lake	Hillsdale County	MI	41°49′58″N 084°23′33″W	919 feet (280 m)	632889	
Mud Lake	Hillsdale County	MI	41°48′46″N 084°30′53″W	1,017 feet (310 m)	632888	
Mud Lake	Hillsdale County	MI	41°51′23″N 084°47′39″W	1,017 feet (310 m)	632890	
Mud Lake	Houghton County	MI	47°07′46″N 088°19′03″W	620 feet (190 m)	633062	
Mud Lake	Houghton County	MI	46°56′06″N 088°35′33″W	925 feet (282 m)	633049	
Mud Lake	Houghton County	MI	46°54′27″N 088°49′03″W	1,204 feet (367 m)	633048	
Mud Lake	Huron County	MI	43°54′33″N 083°20′16″W	581 feet (177 m)	632978	
Mud Lake	Huron County	MI	43°40′53″N 083°12′31″W	732 feet (223 m)	632972	
Mud Lake	Ingham County	MI	42°38′32″N 084°32′48″W	869 feet (265 m)	632937	
Mud Lake	Ingham County	MI	42°31′28″N 084°32′54″W	906 feet (276 m)	632929	
Mud Lake	Ingham County	MI	42°33′12″N 084°10′43″W	906 feet (276 m)	632933	
Wildlife Lake	Ingham County	MI	42°44′23″N 084°23′58″W	840 feet (260 m)	1616460	
Mud Lake	Ionia County	MI	42°48′04″N 085°04′45″W	827 feet (252 m)	632943	
Mud Lake	Iosco County	MI	44°24′07″N 083°46′28″W	837 feet (255 m)	1620934	
Mud Lake	Iosco County	MI	44°24′55″N 083°48′30″W	840 feet (260 m)	632994	
Mud Lake	Iosco County	MI	44°24′15″N 083°52′40″W	886 feet (270 m)	1620935	
Bates Lake	Iron County	MI	46°07′04″N 088°36′50″W	1,611 feet (491 m)	620739	
Chara Lake	Iron County	MI	46°06′12″N 088°45′13″W	1,532 feet (467 m)	1620942	
Little Mud Lake	Iron County	MI	46°03′31″N 088°16′00″W	1,296 feet (395 m)	630700	
Mud Lake	Iron County	MI	45°57′41″N 088°08′24″W	1,276 feet (389 m)	633029	
Mud Lake	Iron County	MI	46°03′34″N 088°16′47″W	1,293 feet (394 m)	633032	
Mud Lake	Iron County	MI	45°59′48″N 088°25′45″W	1,339 feet (408 m)	1620940	
Mud Lake	Iron County	MI	46°05′48″N 088°24′49″W	1,371 feet (418 m)	633034	
Mud Lake	Iron County	MI	46°06′43″N 088°17′22″W	1,394 feet (425 m)	633036	
Mud Lake	Iron County	MI	46°00′35″N 088°39′30″W	1,509 feet (460 m)	1620941	
Mud Lakes	Iron County	MI	46°07′22″N 088°21′38″W	1,375 feet (419 m)	633084	
Mud Lake	Isabella County	MI	43°29′11″N 084°46′07″W	787 feet (240 m)	632968	
Mud Lake	Isabella County	MI	43°41′32″N 084°54′29″W	866 feet (264 m)	632973	
Mud Lake	Isabella County	MI	43°35′04″N 085°04′32″W	991 feet (302 m)	632969	
Mud Lake	Jackson County	MI	42°19′33″N 084°16′59″W	909 feet (277 m)	632914	
Mud Lake	Jackson County	MI	42°23′05″N 084°22′44″W	922 feet (281 m)	632917	
Mud Lake	Jackson County	MI	42°09′39″N 084°10′43″W	928 feet (283 m)	633055	
Mud Lake	Jackson County	MI	42°22′54″N 084°19′58″W	932 feet (284 m)	632915	
Mud Lake	Jackson County	MI	42°11′43″N 084°24′19″W	945 feet (288 m)	632904	
Mud Lake	Jackson County	MI	42°11′39″N 084°20′34″W	961 feet (293 m)	632903	
Mud Lake	Jackson County	MI	42°05′11″N 084°08′51″W	965 feet (294 m)	633054	
Mud Lake	Jackson County	MI	42°08′15″N 084°17′33″W	968 feet (295 m)	632902	
Mud Lake	Jackson County	MI	42°17′18″N 084°12′49″W	984 feet (300 m)	632909	
Mud Lake	Jackson County	MI	42°07′13″N 084°41′02″W	991 feet (302 m)	2112722	
Mud Lake	Jackson County	MI	42°06′46″N 084°27′28″W	1,047 feet (319 m)	632900	
Pine Hills Lake	Jackson County	MI	42°05′37″N 084°29′03″W	1,040 feet (320 m)	634946	
Mud Lake	Kalamazoo County	MI	42°17′37″N 085°44′35″W	814 feet (248 m)	632911	
Mud Lake	Kalamazoo County	MI	42°05′31″N 085°30′55″W	827 feet (252 m)	632898	
Mud Lake	Kalamazoo County	MI	42°07′58″N 085°30′22″W	846 feet (258 m)	632901	
Mud Lake	Kalamazoo County	MI	42°10′07″N 085°42′13″W	892 feet (272 m)	633056	
Mud Lakes	Kalamazoo County	MI	42°22′08″N 085°41′42″W	764 feet (233 m)	633083	
Sagamaw Lake	Kalamazoo County	MI	42°10′23″N 085°26′55″W	846 feet (258 m)	636486	
Mud Lake	Kalkaska County	MI	44°42′26″N 085°18′51″W	928 feet (283 m)	633000	
Mud Lake	Kalkaska County	MI	44°40′02″N 085°13′27″W	1,030 feet (310 m)	632998	
Mid Lake	Kent County	MI	42°57′58″N 085°36′09″W	755 feet (230 m)	632221	
Mud Lake	Kent County	MI	43°05′57″N 085°39′10″W	748 feet (228 m)	632956	
Mud Lake	Keweenaw County	MI	47°27′46″N 087°50′08″W	630 feet (190 m)	633051	
Mud Lake	Keweenaw County	MI	47°57′44″N 088°53′46″W	663 feet (202 m)	633052	
Mud Lake	Keweenaw County	MI	47°25′57″N 088°07′28″W	1,138 feet (347 m)	633063	
Turtle Lake	Keweenaw County	MI	47°21′49″N 088°25′09″W	630 feet (190 m)	633050	
Heart Lake	Lake County	MI	44°03′17″N 085°58′42″W	748 feet (228 m)	1620159	
Leverentz Lake	Lake County	MI	43°54′37″N 085°49′14″W	823 feet (251 m)	1620510	
Little Syers Lake	Lake County	MI	44°04′35″N 085°48′45″W	909 feet (277 m)	1620590	
Midget Lake	Lake County	MI	44°09′39″N 085°56′11″W	814 feet (248 m)	1620818	
Mud Lake	Lake County	MI	43°51′31″N 085°54′30″W	781 feet (238 m)	1622448	
North Pond	Lake County	MI	43°51′40″N 085°50′38″W	787 feet (240 m)	1621056	
Syers Lake	Lake County	MI	44°04′18″N 085°49′02″W	909 feet (277 m)	1621848	
Tussing Lake	Lake County	MI	43°57′55″N 085°50′51″W	896 feet (273 m)	1621975	
Mud Lake	Lapeer County	MI	43°05′28″N 083°26′48″W	797 feet (243 m)	632954	
Mud Lake	Lapeer County	MI	42°58′59″N 083°05′02″W	814 feet (248 m)	632952	
Mud Lake	Lapeer County	MI	43°05′50″N 083°16′26″W	823 feet (251 m)	632955	
Mud Lake	Lapeer County	MI	43°13′21″N 083°27′20″W	856 feet (261 m)	632959	
Mud Lake	Lapeer County	MI	43°04′39″N 083°08′03″W	863 feet (263 m)	632953	
Mud Lake	Lapeer County	MI	42°53′53″N 083°22′25″W	1,024 feet (312 m)	633069	
Mud Lake	Leelanau County	MI	45°10′18″N 085°33′55″W	597 feet (182 m)	633011	
Mud Lake	Lenawee County	MI	42°03′23″N 084°18′26″W	1,007 feet (307 m)	632896	
Mud Lake	Lenawee County	MI	41°58′25″N 084°15′17″W	1,047 feet (319 m)	633053	
Handy Lake	Livingston County	MI	42°37′55″N 083°43′39″W	948 feet (289 m)	627721	
Mud Lake	Livingston County	MI	42°41′52″N 084°00′39″W	892 feet (272 m)	632938	
Mud Lake	Livingston County	MI	42°29′14″N 084°00′17″W	906 feet (276 m)	632926	
Mud Lake	Livingston County	MI	42°30′58″N 084°00′30″W	928 feet (283 m)	632927	
Sayles Lake	Livingston County	MI	42°26′34″N 084°01′37″W	886 feet (270 m)	637308	
Mud Lake	Luce County	MI	46°40′24″N 085°40′23″W	630 feet (190 m)	633047	
Mud Lake	Luce County	MI	46°20′44″N 085°39′28″W	715 feet (218 m)	633042	
Cranberry Lake	Mackinac County	MI	45°56′20″N 084°48′07″W	623 feet (190 m)	1619604	
Little Mud Lake	Mackinac County	MI	46°14′15″N 085°51′20″W	686 feet (209 m)	630702	
Mud Lake	Mackinac County	MI	45°44′49″N 084°26′16″W	607 feet (185 m)	1623063	
Mud Lake	Mackinac County	MI	45°53′05″N 084°48′50″W	614 feet (187 m)	1620939	
Mud Lake	Mackinac County	MI	46°00′08″N 085°39′32″W	620 feet (190 m)	633061	
Mud Lake	Mackinac County	MI	46°05′32″N 085°34′31″W	630 feet (190 m)	633033	
Mud Lake	Mackinac County	MI	46°01′03″N 084°21′52″W	673 feet (205 m)	633030	
Mud Lake	Manistee County	MI	44°23′20″N 086°01′59″W	741 feet (226 m)	632992	
Mud Lake	Manistee County	MI	44°09′58″N 085°56′53″W	801 feet (244 m)	1620933	
Mud Lake	Manistee County	MI	44°30′06″N 086°07′26″W	925 feet (282 m)	633059	
Timmerman Lake	Manistee County	MI	44°11′42″N 086°02′02″W	738 feet (225 m)	1621914	
Big Mud Lake	Marquette County	MI	46°33′16″N 087°43′38″W	1,362 feet (415 m)	621339	
Lake LeVasseur	Marquette County	MI	46°28′41″N 087°12′22″W	623 feet (190 m)	1620501	
Mud Lake	Marquette County	MI	46°17′44″N 087°31′53″W	1,184 feet (361 m)	633040	
Mud Lake	Marquette County	MI	46°29′15″N 087°29′38″W	1,299 feet (396 m)	633044	
Mud Lake	Marquette County	MI	46°16′47″N 088°02′18″W	1,483 feet (452 m)	633039	
Mud Lake	Marquette County	MI	46°28′31″N 087°56′03″W	1,598 feet (487 m)	633043	
Mud Lake	Marquette County	MI	46°29′43″N 087°58′38″W	1,614 feet (492 m)	633045	
Mud Lake	Marquette County	MI	46°32′55″N 088°03′08″W	1,667 feet (508 m)	633046	
Lake Meade	Mason County	MI	44°04′52″N 086°09′13″W	732 feet (223 m)	1620783	
Mud Lake	Mason County	MI	44°06′48″N 086°14′19″W	656 feet (200 m)	632983	
Mud Lake	Mason County	MI	43°50′16″N 086°17′09″W	692 feet (211 m)	1622479	
Mud Lake	Mason County	MI	44°03′22″N 086°07′50″W	722 feet (220 m)	1622846	
Vogel Lake	Mason County	MI	43°59′31″N 086°18′18″W	679 feet (207 m)	1622033	
Canadian Lakes	Mecosta County	MI	43°35′00″N 085°18′06″W	961 feet (293 m)	1618850	
Elm Lake	Mecosta County	MI	43°46′51″N 085°24′41″W	968 feet (295 m)	632975	
Mud Lake	Mecosta County	MI	43°42′21″N 085°12′28″W	994 feet (303 m)	632974	
Mud Lake	Mecosta County	MI	43°38′20″N 085°11′04″W	1,014 feet (309 m)	632971	
Mud Lake	Mecosta County	MI	43°37′03″N 085°09′55″W	1,014 feet (309 m)	632970	
Little Pine Lake	Menominee County	MI	45°44′07″N 087°20′53″W	794 feet (242 m)	630733	
Mud Lake	Missaukee County	MI	44°20′35″N 085°18′22″W	1,243 feet (379 m)	2104148	
Little Mud Lake	Montcalm County	MI	43°13′34″N 085°11′41″W	856 feet (261 m)	630696	
Mud Lake	Montcalm County	MI	43°14′23″N 084°58′22″W	791 feet (241 m)	632960	
Mud Lake	Montcalm County	MI	43°16′21″N 084°55′16″W	794 feet (242 m)	632963	
Mud Lake	Montcalm County	MI	43°08′08″N 085°11′02″W	794 feet (242 m)	632958	
Mud Lake	Montcalm County	MI	43°16′56″N 085°16′01″W	840 feet (260 m)	632964	
Mud Lake	Montcalm County	MI	43°14′30″N 085°11′17″W	860 feet (260 m)	632961	
Mud Lake	Montcalm County	MI	43°22′15″N 085°10′51″W	902 feet (275 m)	632965	
Mud Lake	Montcalm County	MI	43°26′44″N 085°05′57″W	919 feet (280 m)	632967	
Mud Lake	Montcalm County	MI	43°25′38″N 085°10′16″W	938 feet (286 m)	632966	
Lunden Lake	Montmorency County	MI	44°58′19″N 084°18′45″W	1,345 feet (410 m)	1617074	
Hendrickson Lake	Muskegon County	MI	43°21′19″N 086°04′57″W	640 feet (200 m)	1620171	
John Adams Lake	Muskegon County	MI	43°23′23″N 086°09′01″W	673 feet (205 m)	1620371	
Mud Lake	Muskegon County	MI	43°15′42″N 085°49′00″W	830 feet (250 m)	632962	
Sweet Lake	Muskegon County	MI	43°22′59″N 086°09′04″W	669 feet (204 m)	1614493	
Blood Lake	Newaygo County	MI	43°18′38″N 085°53′47″W	735 feet (224 m)	621608	
Kemperman Lake	Newaygo County	MI	43°29′46″N 085°51′00″W	827 feet (252 m)	1620405	
Kempf Lake	Newaygo County	MI	43°29′00″N 085°56′30″W	860 feet (260 m)	629569	
Little Mud Lake	Newaygo County	MI	43°20′42″N 085°34′52″W	922 feet (281 m)	630697	
Mud Lake	Newaygo County	MI	43°38′20″N 085°57′58″W	794 feet (242 m)	1620930	
Mud Lake	Newaygo County	MI	43°38′00″N 085°59′10″W	794 feet (242 m)	1620929	
Mud Lake	Newaygo County	MI	43°29′18″N 085°52′32″W	840 feet (260 m)	1620944	
Mud Lake	Newaygo County	MI	43°35′52″N 085°36′24″W	978 feet (298 m)	1622472	
Mud Lake	Newaygo County	MI	43°42′33″N 085°35′10″W	1,145 feet (349 m)	1620931	
Pearson Lake	Newaygo County	MI	43°36′00″N 085°37′02″W	991 feet (302 m)	1621179	
Lake Hope	Oakland County	MI	42°51′01″N 083°36′12″W	922 feet (281 m)	632948	
Lake Mauna Loa	Oakland County	MI	42°48′40″N 083°37′06″W	912 feet (278 m)	631747	
Lantern Lake	Oakland County	MI	42°41′42″N 083°18′18″W	961 feet (293 m)	1623107	
Mud Lake	Oakland County	MI	42°48′20″N 083°39′40″W	892 feet (272 m)	632945	
Mud Lake	Oakland County	MI	42°34′53″N 083°19′29″W	915 feet (279 m)	632934	
Mud Lake	Oakland County	MI	42°32′27″N 083°29′13″W	932 feet (284 m)	632931	
Mud Lake	Oakland County	MI	42°38′10″N 083°29′59″W	932 feet (284 m)	633066	
Mud Lake	Oakland County	MI	42°37′17″N 083°33′00″W	945 feet (288 m)	632935	
Mud Lake	Oakland County	MI	42°52′47″N 083°09′22″W	984 feet (300 m)	632949	
Mud Lake	Oakland County	MI	42°43′12″N 083°16′41″W	991 feet (302 m)	632939	
Mud Lake	Oakland County	MI	42°52′25″N 083°23′26″W	1,053 feet (321 m)	633068	
West Wind Lake	Oakland County	MI	42°44′41″N 083°37′14″W	971 feet (296 m)	1616193	
Woodbridge Lake	Oakland County	MI	42°34′24″N 083°29′02″W	912 feet (278 m)	1623030	
Bragg Lake	Oceana County	MI	43°34′39″N 086°16′37″W	774 feet (236 m)	1619303	
Heitman Lake	Oceana County	MI	43°30′34″N 086°17′35″W	663 feet (202 m)	1620162	
Leavitt Lake	Oceana County	MI	43°41′05″N 086°09′18″W	830 feet (250 m)	1620503	
Mud Lake	Oceana County	MI	43°35′06″N 086°07′03″W	755 feet (230 m)	1620928	
Mud Lake	Oceana County	MI	43°45′32″N 086°09′31″W	892 feet (272 m)	1620932	
Elni Lake	Ogemaw County	MI	44°24′00″N 084°16′27″W	1,260 feet (380 m)	625537	
Jewett Lake	Ogemaw County	MI	44°23′44″N 084°01′43″W	873 feet (266 m)	1620364	
Little Mud Lake	Ogemaw County	MI	44°11′14″N 084°00′03″W	804 feet (245 m)	630703	
Mud Lake	Ogemaw County	MI	44°12′37″N 083°59′27″W	804 feet (245 m)	632989	
Mud Lake	Ogemaw County	MI	44°12′30″N 083°54′21″W	810 feet (250 m)	632988	
Mud Lake	Ogemaw County	MI	44°15′45″N 083°56′56″W	837 feet (255 m)	632990	
Mud Lake	Ogemaw County	MI	44°11′38″N 084°15′19″W	856 feet (261 m)	632987	
Mud Lake	Ogemaw County	MI	44°10′28″N 084°20′57″W	873 feet (266 m)	632986	
Mud Lake	Ogemaw County	MI	44°24′45″N 083°55′21″W	906 feet (276 m)	1620936	
Mud Lake	Ogemaw County	MI	44°26′24″N 084°01′05″W	935 feet (285 m)	1620937	
Mud Lake	Ogemaw County	MI	44°18′52″N 084°09′39″W	965 feet (294 m)	632991	
Withey Lake	Ogemaw County	MI	44°17′38″N 084°00′07″W	856 feet (261 m)	1616666	
Little Mud Lake	Osceola County	MI	44°02′49″N 085°20′40″W	1,257 feet (383 m)	630698	
Mud Lake	Osceola County	MI	43°58′35″N 085°27′13″W	1,188 feet (362 m)	632979	
Mud Lake	Osceola County	MI	44°00′33″N 085°23′52″W	1,214 feet (370 m)	632980	
Rendezvous Lake	Osceola County	MI	44°02′49″N 085°20′03″W	1,257 feet (383 m)	635796	
Silver Lake	Osceola County	MI	44°00′19″N 085°24′02″W	1,214 feet (370 m)	637946	
Woods Lake	Osceola County	MI	43°54′23″N 085°08′00″W	1,037 feet (316 m)	632977	
Mud Lake	Oscoda County	MI	44°50′05″N 083°56′04″W	876 feet (267 m)	1620938	
Mud Lake	Oscoda County	MI	44°45′25″N 084°04′56″W	1,086 feet (331 m)	633002	
Mud Lake	Otsego County	MI	45°11′32″N 084°29′45″W	938 feet (286 m)	633013	
Mud Lake	Otsego County	MI	44°56′28″N 084°28′33″W	1,247 feet (380 m)	633004	
Mud Lake	Ottawa County	MI	42°46′17″N 085°52′11″W	656 feet (200 m)	632941	
Mud Lake	Ottawa County	MI	43°06′14″N 085°48′49″W	823 feet (251 m)	632957	
Mud Lake	Presque Isle County	MI	45°22′07″N 083°42′59″W	623 feet (190 m)	633020	
Mud Lake	Presque Isle County	MI	45°30′01″N 084°08′12″W	623 feet (190 m)	633060	
Mud Lake	Presque Isle County	MI	45°19′23″N 084°00′15″W	791 feet (241 m)	633018	
Mud Lake	Presque Isle County	MI	45°12′13″N 084°10′40″W	833 feet (254 m)	633014	
Backus Lake	Roscommon County	MI	44°19′07″N 084°33′57″W	1,158 feet (353 m)	620415	
Little Woods Lake	Roscommon County	MI	44°13′48″N 084°28′50″W	1,165 feet (355 m)	630826	
Mud Lake	Roscommon County	MI	44°23′48″N 084°26′53″W	1,155 feet (352 m)	632993	
Canoe Lake	Schoolcraft County	MI	46°27′41″N 086°17′35″W	883 feet (269 m)	622697	
Jarr Lake	Schoolcraft County	MI	46°11′38″N 086°27′41″W	732 feet (223 m)	1620354	
Kennedy Lake	Schoolcraft County	MI	46°12′34″N 085°53′10″W	705 feet (215 m)	629587	
Lorraine Lake	Schoolcraft County	MI	46°08′41″N 086°28′59″W	715 feet (218 m)	1620624	
Mud Lake	Schoolcraft County	MI	46°01′56″N 086°04′15″W	653 feet (199 m)	633031	
Mud Lake	St. Clair County	MI	42°36′52″N 082°38′21″W	571 feet (174 m)	1624768	
Mud Lake	St. Joseph County	MI	41°59′13″N 085°17′47″W	843 feet (257 m)	1624766	
Mud Lake	St. Joseph County	MI	42°03′34″N 085°17′48″W	853 feet (260 m)	1624767	Athens
Mud Lake	St. Joseph County	MI	41°57′33″N 085°43′26″W	866 feet (264 m)	1624765	
Mud Lake	St. Joseph County	MI	41°56′06″N 085°43′36″W	876 feet (267 m)	1624764	
Mud Lake	Tuscola County	MI	43°13′34″N 083°37′29″W	735 feet (224 m)	633070	
Mud Lake	Van Buren County	MI	42°16′41″N 086°18′05″W	640 feet (200 m)	1618432	
Mud Lake	Van Buren County	MI	42°16′17″N 086°08′52″W	653 feet (199 m)	632908	
Mud Lake	Van Buren County	MI	42°24′59″N 086°05′35″W	666 feet (203 m)	632919	
Mud Lake	Van Buren County	MI	42°07′33″N 085°55′10″W	748 feet (228 m)	633064	
Mud Lake	Van Buren County	MI	42°24′32″N 085°53′23″W	748 feet (228 m)	2112780	
Mud Lake	Van Buren County	MI	42°12′19″N 085°51′09″W	751 feet (229 m)	632905	
Mud Lake	Van Buren County	MI	42°14′40″N 085°49′50″W	755 feet (230 m)	2112872	
Mud Lake	Van Buren County	MI	42°06′02″N 085°58′48″W	755 feet (230 m)	632899	
Mud Lake	Van Buren County	MI	42°04′40″N 085°48′00″W	886 feet (270 m)	632897	
Mud Lake	Washtenaw County	MI	42°24′50″N 083°47′39″W	886 feet (270 m)	632918	Whitmore Lake, Michigan
Mud Lake	Washtenaw County	MI	42°20′52″N 084°07′39″W	948 feet (289 m)	633065	Waterloo State Recreation Area near Waterloo, Michigan
Mud Lakes	Washtenaw County	MI	42°18′35″N 084°06′06″W	968 feet (295 m)	633082	
Gyttja Lake	Wexford County	MI	44°16′17″N 085°29′20″W	1,289 feet (393 m)	627564	

*Note on lakes that span more than one county: The county column only shows the first county returned by GNIS in this column.

== See also ==
- List of lakes in Michigan
