= Baltimore Township, Michigan =

- Township
- Location within the state of Michigan
- Coordinates: 42°33′23″N 85°14′40″W
- Country: United States
- State: Michigan
- County: Barry

Area
  - Total: 36.2 sq mi (93.8 km^{2})
  - Land: 35.4 sq mi (91.7 km^{2})
  - Water: 0.77 sq mi (2.0 km^{2})
- Elevation: 978 ft (298 m)

Population (2020)
  - Total: 1,947
  - Density: 55.0/sq mi (21.2/km^{2})
- Time zone: UTC-5 (Eastern (EST))
  - Summer (DST): UTC-4 (EDT)
- ZIP code: 49050 (Dowling), 49058 (Hastings, 49073 (Nashville)
- FIPS code: 26-05020
- GNIS feature ID: 1625877
- Website: baltimoretwp.com

Baltimore Township is a civil township of Barry County in the U.S. state of Michigan. As of the 2020 census, the township population was 1,947. Baltimore Township was established in 1849.

== Communities ==
- Dowling is a census-designated place and post office in the township centered on the junction of M-37 and Dowling Road at 42°31′21″N 85°15′11″W. The Dowling ZIP code 49050 serves the southern portion of the township as well as portions of Maple Grove Township to the east, Assyria Township to the southeast, Johnstown Township to the south, Barry Township to the southwest, and Hope Township to the west. The settlement was informally named "Baltimore" as early as 1842 in memory of the home of prominent settlers. A post office named Baltimore was established in May 1850. The name was changed to Dowling in March 1880.
- The city of Hastings is to the north of the township, and the Hastings ZIP code, 49058, serves the northern portion of the township.
- The village of Nashville is to the northeast of the township, and the Nashville ZIP code, 49073, serves a small portion along the eastern boundary of the township.

== Geography ==
According to the United States Census Bureau, the township has a total area of 36.2 square miles (93.8 km^{2}), of which 35.4 square miles (91.7 km^{2}) is land and 0.77 square miles (2.0 km^{2}), or 2.18%, is water.

== Demographics ==
As of the census of 2000, there were 1,845 people, 693 households, and 537 families residing in the township. The population density was 52.1 inhabitants per square mile (20.1/km^{2}). There were 737 housing units at an average density of 20.8 per square mile (8.0/km^{2}). The racial makeup of the township was 98.37% White, 0.22% African American, 0.22% Native American, 0.22% Asian, 0.11% from other races, and 0.87% from two or more races. Hispanic or Latino of any race were 0.76% of the population.

There were 693 households, out of which 31.9% had children under the age of 18 living with them, 68.0% were married couples living together, 5.1% had a female householder with no husband present, and 22.4% were non-families. 18.2% of all households were made up of individuals, and 7.6% had someone living alone who was 65 years of age or older. The average household size was 2.63 and the average family size was 2.94.

In the township the population was spread out, with 23.6% under the age of 18, 7.2% from 18 to 24, 27.8% from 25 to 44, 27.0% from 45 to 64, and 14.5% who were 65 years of age or older. The median age was 40 years. For every 100 females, there were 104.5 males. For every 100 females age 18 and over, there were 104.3 males.

The median income for a household in the township was $45,761, and the median income for a family was $50,197. Males had a median income of $33,929 versus $23,309 for females. The per capita income for the township was $20,405. About 4.4% of families and 9.8% of the population were below the poverty line, including 11.1% of those under age 18 and 2.2% of those age 65 or over.
