= Johnstown Township =

Johnstown Township may refer to:

- Johnstown Township, Michigan
- Johnstown Township, Grand Forks County, North Dakota, in Grand Forks County, North Dakota
