= Daniel Striker House =

Historic house in Michigan, United States

- U.S. National Register of Historic Places
- Michigan State Historic Site
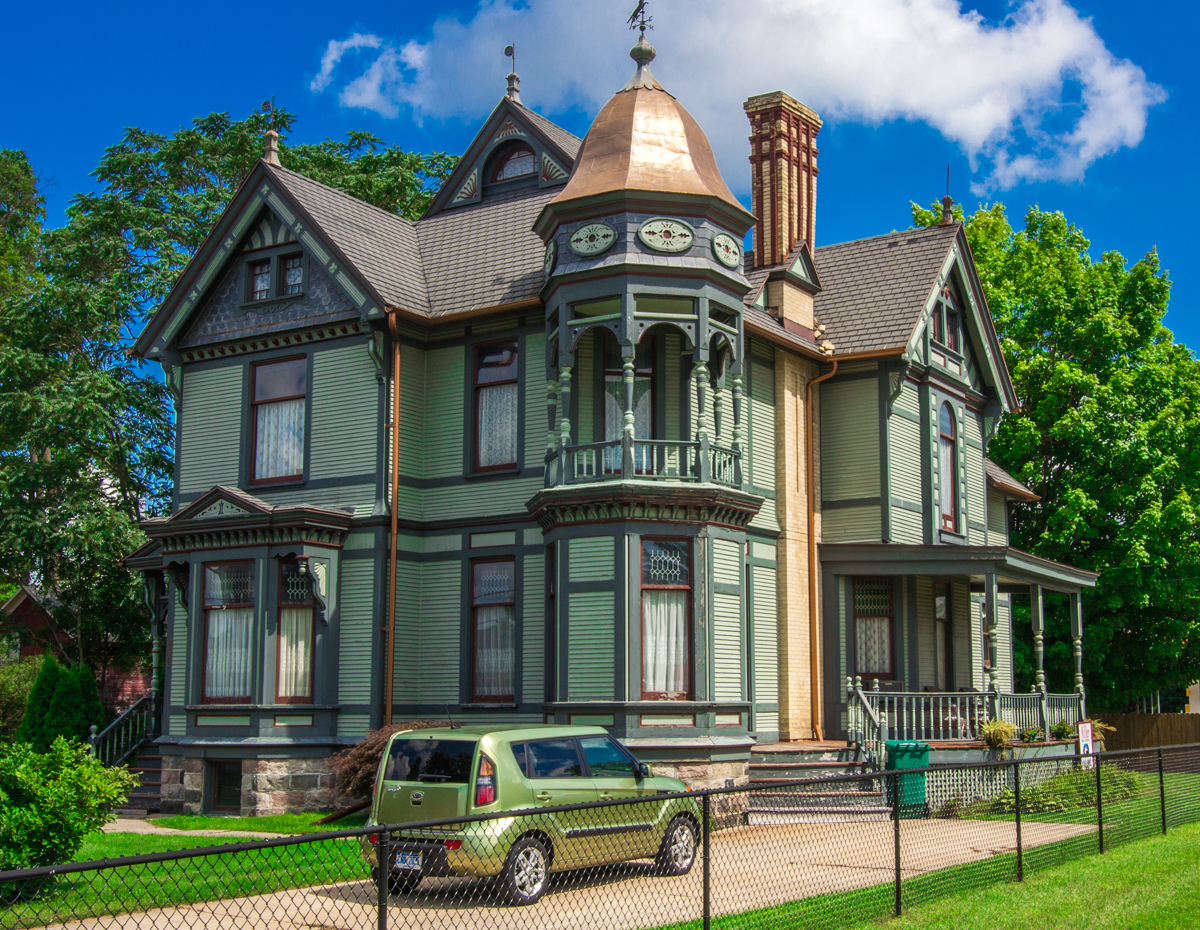

- Location within Michigan Location within the United States
- Interactive map
- Location: 321 S. Jefferson St., Hastings, Michigan
- Coordinates: 42°38′46″N 85°17′12″W
- Area: less than one acre
- Built: 1885
- Architectural style: Queen Anne
- NRHP reference No.: 72000592
- Added to NRHP: January 13, 1972

The Daniel Striker House is a private house located at 321 South Jefferson Street in Hastings, Michigan. It was listed on the National Register of Historic Places in 1972.

== History ==
Daniel Striker was born in 1835 in Rose, New York, to Gilbert and Rebecca Striker. Not long after his birth, his family moved to Jackson County, Michigan, where they lived until Daniel was a teenager. In 1851, the family purchased a large tract of land in Barry County's Baltimore Township, and moved once again. Daniel Striker attended schools in Hastings and what is now Spring Arbor University, then began teaching school. In 1855, he moved on to work as a clerk at a local firm, and in 1860 was elected as clerk of Barry County. In 1862, he married Sarah E. Fancher; the couple had one daughter, Rebekah, and adopted a son. Striker served as Clerk or Deputy Clerk of the county until 1870, when he was elected as Michigan Secretary of State, a position he held for four years. Afterward, Striker was several times elected as Barry County Supervisor or Assessor; he spent much of his time in financial dealings, acting as an officer or director of several banks.

Daniel Striker constructed this house in the 1880s; it was contemporaneously called "the handsomest residence in Hastings." He lived there until his death in 1898. Striker's wife Sarah lived in the house until her death in 1915. After that, the house was used as the second home for Hastings' first hospital, then known as Good Samaritan. In the 1960s, it was converted into apartments and became a convalescent home. It was later refurbished into a single-family home.

== Description ==
The Striker House is a 2 1/2-story Queen Anne structure, measuring 42 feet (13 m) by 60 feet (18 m). It sits on an ashlar foundation and is covered with clap board siding. The house is elaborate in design, and features numerous gables, bays, dormers, as well as a distinctive octagonal tower in one corner. The window pattern is irregular, including some stained glass windows.
