= Barry Township, Michigan =

- Township
- Township of Barry
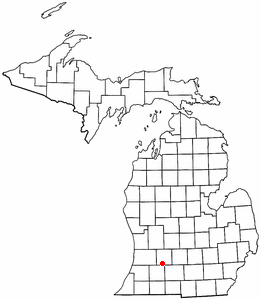
- Location of Barry Township in Michigan
- Coordinates: 42°28′2″N 85°22′33″W
- Country: United States
- State: Michigan
- County: Barry
- Organized: 4 April 1836

Area
  - Total: 36.5 sq mi (94.5 km^{2})
  - Land: 34.4 sq mi (89.2 km^{2})
  - Water: 2.1 sq mi (5.4 km^{2})
- Elevation: 932 ft (284 m)

Population (2020)
  - Total: 3,417
  - Density: 99.2/sq mi (38.3/km^{2})
- Time zone: UTC-5 (Eastern (EST))
  - Summer (DST): UTC-4 (EDT)
- ZIP code: 49046 (Delton), 49060 (Hickory Corners), 49017 (Battle Creek
- FIPS code: 26-05560
- GNIS feature ID: 1625885
- Website: barrytownshipmi.com

Barry Township is a civil township of Barry County in the U.S. state of Michigan. As of the 2020 census, the township population was 3,417.

== History ==
Barry Township was the original township, with boundaries co-extensive with Barry County, from which all the townships of the county were partitioned. On March 23, 1836, a legislative act provided for the organization of Barry Township of Barry. The first township meeting was held at the house of Nicholas Campbell in Barry Township (now Prairieville Township) on 4 April 1836.

== Communities ==
- Delton is an unincorporated community and census-designated place in the northwest part of the township centered around the junction of M-43 and E Orchard Street at 42°29′59″N 85°24′29″W. The Delton ZIP code, 49046, serves most of the northern part of the township as well as portions of Johnstown Township to the east, Hope Township to the north, Orangeville Township to the northwest, Prairieville Township to the west. A small portion of southeastern Yankee Springs Township to the north of Orangeville Township is also served by the Delton ZIP code. A post office was first requested under the name "Dellstown", but was established as Delton in May 1877.
- Hickory Corners is an unincorporated community and census-designated place approximately 16 miles (26 km) northwest of Battle Creek and about 17 miles (27 km) northeast of Kalamazoo at 42°26′29″N 85°22′32″W. The Gilmore Car Museum is located in Hickory Corners. The Hickory Corners ZIP code, 49060, serves most of the southern portion of the township as well as portions of Prairieville Township to the west and Ross Township to the south in Kalamazoo County. The first settler, the Rev. Moses Lawrence, built his home in 1834 on the shore of Lawrence Lake about a half mile from the present town. In 1837, surveyors found a large hickory tree in the center of section 28, from which the settlement took its name. Solomon C. Hall built the first house in the town and became the first postmaster in July 1844.
- The city of Battle Creek is to the southeast, and the Battle Creek ZIP code, 49017, serves the southeast corner of Barry Township.

== Geography ==
According to the United States Census Bureau, the township has a total area of 36.5 square miles (94.5 km^{2}), of which 34.4 square miles (89.2 km^{2}) is land and 2.1 square miles (5.4 km^{2}), or 5.69%, is water.

It is located 50 miles (80 km) southeast of Grand Rapids.

== Demographics ==
As of the census of 2000, there were 3,489 people, 1,265 households, and 986 families residing in the township. The population density was 100.2 inhabitants per square mile (38.7/km^{2}). There were 1,460 housing units at an average density of 41.9 per square mile (16.2/km^{2}). The racial makeup of the township was 97.56% White, 0.37% African American, 0.63% Native American, 0.43% Asian, 0.11% from other races, and 0.89% from two or more races. Hispanic or Latino of any race were 1.12% of the population.

There were 1,265 households, out of which 34.2% had children under the age of 18 living with them, 67.7% were married couples living together, 6.7% had a female householder with no husband present, and 22.0% were non-families. 17.9% of all households were made up of individuals, and 8.3% had someone living alone who was 65 years of age or older. The average household size was 2.74 and the average family size was 3.08.

In the township the population was spread out, with 26.5% under the age of 18, 7.1% from 18 to 24, 27.6% from 25 to 44, 26.7% from 45 to 64, and 12.1% who were 65 years of age or older. The median age was 39 years. For every 100 females, there were 100.9 males. For every 100 females age 18 and over, there were 99.8 males.

The median income for a household in the township was $45,339, and the median income for a family was $50,116. Males had a median income of $37,929 versus $21,451 for females. The per capita income for the township was $22,370. About 3.0% of families and 5.5% of the population were below the poverty line, including 5.8% of those under age 18 and 8.8% of those age 65 or over.
