= Ross, Michigan =

Ross, Michigan may refer to:

- Ross Township, Kalamazoo County, Michigan
- Ross, Kent County, Michigan, a small, mostly historic settlement
