= Gull Lake High School =

Public school in Michigan, United States

Location
- 7753 North 34th Street; Richland, Michigan 49083; United States; 42°22′21″N 85°26′20″W

Information
- Type: Public High School
- School district: Gull Lake Community Schools
- Superintendent: Christopher Rundle
- Principal: Bobbi Jo Stoner
- Teaching staff: 47.45 (FTE)
- Enrollment: 844 (2023–2024)
- Student to teacher ratio: 17.79
- Colors: Navy and white
- Athletics conference: Southwest Michigan Athletic Conference
- Nickname: Blue Devils
- Newspaper: The Reflection
- Website: www.gulllakecs.org/glhs

Gull Lake High School is part of the Gull Lake Community Schools in Richland, Michigan. The district was consolidated in the early 1960s from the existing Richland, Kellogg, and Bedford secondary schools and serves nearly 1000 students from a three-county area: NE Kalamazoo, NW Calhoun, and Southern Barry Counties. The school mascot is the Blue Devil.

== Demographics ==
The demographic breakdown of the 962 students enrolled for the 2012-2013 school year was:

- Male - 49.8%
- Female - 51.2%
- Native American/Alaskan - 0.2%
- Asian/Pacific islanders - 1.3%
- Black - 3.8%
- Hispanic - 2.7%
- White - 89.1%
- Multiracial - 2.9%

In addition, 15.2% of the students were eligible for free or reduced lunch.

== Athletics ==
Gull Lake High School athletes compete in the Southwest Michigan Athletic Conference (SMAC). The athletes earned All Sports Champion recognition several years running.

Fall Sports: football, boys soccer, girls volleyball, sideline cheer, girls golf, boys tennis, cross country, marching band

Winter Sports: boys basketball, girls basketball, boys bowling, girls bowling, girls competitive cheer, wrestling

Spring Sports: boys baseball, girls softball, track, girls soccer, boys golf, girls tennis, boys volleyball

== Notable alumni ==
- Carson Hocevar, Class of 2021, NASCAR driver competing full-time in the NASCAR Cup Series in the No. 77 car for Spire Motorsports.
- Jason Newsted, Class of 1981, is a bassist known best for his work with Metallica.
- Caleb Porter, Class of 1993, who was a collegiate and professional soccer player before becoming a United States National Team and MLS coach.
- Xavier Prather, Class of 2012, first African-American winner of Big Brother.
