= Nashville, Michigan =

- Village
- Location of Nashville, Michigan
- Coordinates: 42°36′13″N 85°5′26″W
- Country: United States
- State: Michigan
- County: Barry
- Township: Castleton Township, Maple Grove Township

Area
  - Total: 2.22 sq mi (5.74 km^{2})
  - Land: 2.11 sq mi (5.46 km^{2})
  - Water: 0.11 sq mi (0.28 km^{2})
- Elevation: 820 ft (250 m)

Population (2020)
  - Total: 1,537
  - Density: 729.4/sq mi (281.61/km^{2})
- Time zone: UTC-5 (Eastern (EST))
  - Summer (DST): UTC-4 (EDT)
- ZIP code: 49073
- Area code: 517
- FIPS code: 26-56680
- GNIS feature ID: 0633223
- Website: http://www.nashvillemi.us/

Nashville is a village in Barry County in the U.S. state of Michigan. The population was 1,537 at the 2020 census. The township exists largely within Castleton Township, with a small portion extending south into Maple Grove Township.

== History ==
The initial plat for Nashville was on land originally purchased by John R. Pettibone on February 15, 1836. The land was part of Barry Township and then Hastings Township until February 16, 1842, when the land became Section 36 of the newly formed Castleton Township. By 1865, Robert B. Gregg owned the land and platted 127 lots on the south side of the Thornapple River. The survey was done by Joshua Martin and certified on October 2, 1865. Gregg's first lot sale was to Enos Kuhlman. By 1875, seven additions had been made to the original plat.

In 1852, Henry Feighner and his brother Solomon arrived from Ohio seeking to buy land. In addition to 80 acres (320,000 m^{2}) purchased from Horace Butler, Henry bought the property of Hiram Hanchett, including Hanchett’s sawmill located on the west side of the Thornapple. Solomon managed the sawmill until Henry sold the property to Phillip Holler in about 1865.

In 1867, across the river from Holler's sawmill, a gristmill was built by Eli and M. V. B. Mallett, and G. W. Johnson. Holler bought the new gristmill from the Mallett's and Johnson in 1868. Holler continued to use the original sawmill as a feedmill.

Some time after 1869, probably 1873–1874, Griffith and Grant built a grain elevator alongside the new Grand River Valley Division of the Michigan Central Railroad. In 1874 Ainsworth and Brooks bought the elevator and 3 years later added a steam powered feedmill. It was at that time that Holler initiated a new patent process for making flour. Holler's mill became known as the Nashville Roller Mills. And by 1916, when Louis Lass and son Otto bought the mill, flour was sold as Red-eye Flour.

Until 1869 the community had remained nameless. In 1866 the chief engineer for the Grand River Valley Railroad began a survey for a route from Jackson to Grand Rapids. Garaudus Nash suggested that his name be used. Without objection, the community was named Nashville. On March 26, 1869, Michigan governor Henry Baldwin signed into law the incorporation of the Village of Nashville.

Commencing in 1920 Nashville was used as the half-way stopping point between the Jackson and Grand Rapids railroad terminals. It took the trains one day (the trains did not travel at night) to reach Nashville from either the Jackson or Grand Rapids terminals. Prior to 1920 trains had stopped in Hastings overnight. These "stop-overs" required a hostler to tend the locomotives while the train crew spent the night in town. In 1920 Nashville became the stop-over point and the hostler's job was moved to Nashville.

== Geography ==
According to the United States Census Bureau, the village has a total area of 2.23 square miles (5.78 km^{2}), of which 2.12 square miles (5.49 km^{2}) is land and 0.11 square miles (0.28 km^{2}) is water.

== Demographics ==
Historical population
| Census | Pop. | Note | %± |
|---|---|---|---|
| 1870 | 642 | | — |
| 1880 | 978 | | 52.3% |
| 1890 | 1,029 | | 5.2% |
| 1900 | 1,164 | | 13.1% |
| 1910 | 1,346 | | 15.6% |
| 1920 | 1,376 | | 2.2% |
| 1930 | 1,249 | | −9.2% |
| 1940 | 1,279 | | 2.4% |
| 1950 | 1,374 | | 7.4% |
| 1960 | 1,525 | | 11.0% |
| 1970 | 1,558 | | 2.2% |
| 1980 | 1,628 | | 4.5% |
| 1990 | 1,654 | | 1.6% |
| 2000 | 1,684 | | 1.8% |
| 2010 | 1,628 | | −3.3% |
| 2020 | 1,537 | | −5.6% |
U.S. Decennial Census

=== 2020 census ===
As of the 2020 census, Nashville had a population of 1,537. The median age was 38.0 years. 25.3% of residents were under the age of 18 and 14.8% of residents were 65 years of age or older. For every 100 females there were 99.6 males, and for every 100 females age 18 and over there were 94.9 males age 18 and over.

0.0% of residents lived in urban areas, while 100.0% lived in rural areas.

There were 630 households in Nashville, of which 31.0% had children under the age of 18 living in them. Of all households, 40.0% were married-couple households, 20.2% were households with a male householder and no spouse or partner present, and 29.2% were households with a female householder and no spouse or partner present. About 29.4% of all households were made up of individuals and 12.5% had someone living alone who was 65 years of age or older.

There were 684 housing units, of which 7.9% were vacant. The homeowner vacancy rate was 3.1% and the rental vacancy rate was 4.5%.

Racial composition as of the 2020 census
| Race | Number | Percent |
|---|---|---|
| White | 1,430 | 93.0% |
| Black or African American | 4 | 0.3% |
| American Indian and Alaska Native | 12 | 0.8% |
| Asian | 5 | 0.3% |
| Native Hawaiian and Other Pacific Islander | 0 | 0.0% |
| Some other race | 7 | 0.5% |
| Two or more races | 79 | 5.1% |
| Hispanic or Latino (of any race) | 33 | 2.1% |

=== 2010 census ===
As of the 2010 census, there were 1,628 people, 620 households, and 415 families residing in the village. The population density was 767.9 inhabitants per square mile (296.5/km^{2}). There were 708 housing units at an average density of 334.0 per square mile (129.0/km^{2}). The racial makeup of the village was 97.2% White, 0.2% African American, 0.6% Native American, 0.4% Asian, 0.4% from other races, and 1.2% from two or more races. Hispanic or Latino of any race were 2.1% of the population.

There were 620 households, of which 34.8% had children under the age of 18 living with them, 45.8% were married couples living together, 14.0% had a female householder with no husband present, 7.1% had a male householder with no wife present, and 33.1% were non-families. 27.1% of all households were made up of individuals, and 12.2% had someone living alone who was 65 years of age or older. The average household size was 2.63 and the average family size was 3.15.

The median age in the village was 35.9 years. 26.6% of residents were under the age of 18; 8.1% were between the ages of 18 and 24; 26.7% were from 25 to 44; 25.7% were from 45 to 64; and 12.9% were 65 years of age or older. The gender makeup of the village was 49.2% male and 50.8% female.

=== 2000 census ===
As of the 2000 census, there were 1,684 people, 647 households, and 447 families residing in the village. The population density was 802.8 inhabitants per square mile (310.0/km^{2}). There were 685 housing units at an average density of 326.6 per square mile (126.1/km^{2}). The racial makeup of the village was 97.62% White, 0.59% Native American, 0.36% Asian, 0.12% from other races, and 1.31% from two or more races. Hispanic or Latino of any race were 0.89% of the population.

There were 648 households, out of which 36.6% had children under the age of 18 living with them, 50.5% were married couples living together, 15.0% had a female householder with no husband present, and 30.9% were non-families. 24.7% of all households were made up of individuals, and 10.0% had someone living alone who was 65 years of age or older. The average household size was 2.60 and the average family size was 3.12.

In the village, the population was spread out, with 29.0% under the age of 18, 9.1% from 18 to 24, 29.2% from 25 to 44, 19.2% from 45 to 64, and 13.4% who were 65 years of age or older. The median age was 34 years. For every 100 females, there were 89.6 males. For every 100 females age 18 and over, there were 87.9 males.

The median income for a household in the village was $32,857, and the median income for a family was $36,250. Males had a median income of $31,311 versus $22,760 for females. The per capita income for the village was $14,147. About 8.4% of families and 10.6% of the population were below the poverty line, including 8.9% of those under age 18 and 14.4% of those age 65 or over.
