= Hickory Corners, Michigan =

- Census-designated place (CDP) & unincorporated community
- Location within Michigan
- Coordinates: 42°26′29″N 85°22′33″W
- Country: United States
- State: Michigan
- County: Barry
- Township: Barry

Area
  - Total: 2.08 sq mi (5.38 km^{2})
  - Land: 2.07 sq mi (5.36 km^{2})
  - Water: 0.0039 sq mi (0.01 km^{2})
- Elevation: 947 ft (289 m)

Population (2020)
  - Total: 313
  - Density: 151.2/sq mi (58.37/km^{2})
- Time zone: UTC-5 (Eastern (EST))
  - Summer (DST): UTC-4 (EDT)
- ZIP code: 49060
- Area code: 269
- FIPS code: 26-37960
- GNIS feature ID: 0628188

Hickory Corners is a census-designated place (CDP) in Barry Township in Barry County, Michigan, United States. The population was 313 at the 2020 census.

== History ==
The first settler, the Rev. Moses Lawrence, built his home in 1834 on the shore of Lawrence Lake about a half mile east of the present town. In 1837, surveyors found a large hickory tree in the center of section 28, from which the settlement took its name. Solomon C. Hall built the first house in the town and became the first postmaster in July 1844.

== Geography ==
Hickory Corners is located in southwestern Barry County at the intersection of Kellogg School Road and West Hickory Road. It is 1.5 miles (2.4 km) north of the southern boundary of Barry County with Kalamazoo County and 2.5 miles (4.0 km) east of state highway M-43.

According to the United States Census Bureau, the Hickory Corners CDP has a total area of 2.1 square miles (5.4 km^{2}), of which 0.004 square miles (0.01 km^{2}), or 0.28%, is water.

== Demographics ==
Historical population
Census	Pop.	Note	%±
2010	322		—
2020	313		−2.8%
U.S. Decennial Census
