= South Gull Lake, Michigan =

- Census-designated place (CDP) & unincorporated community
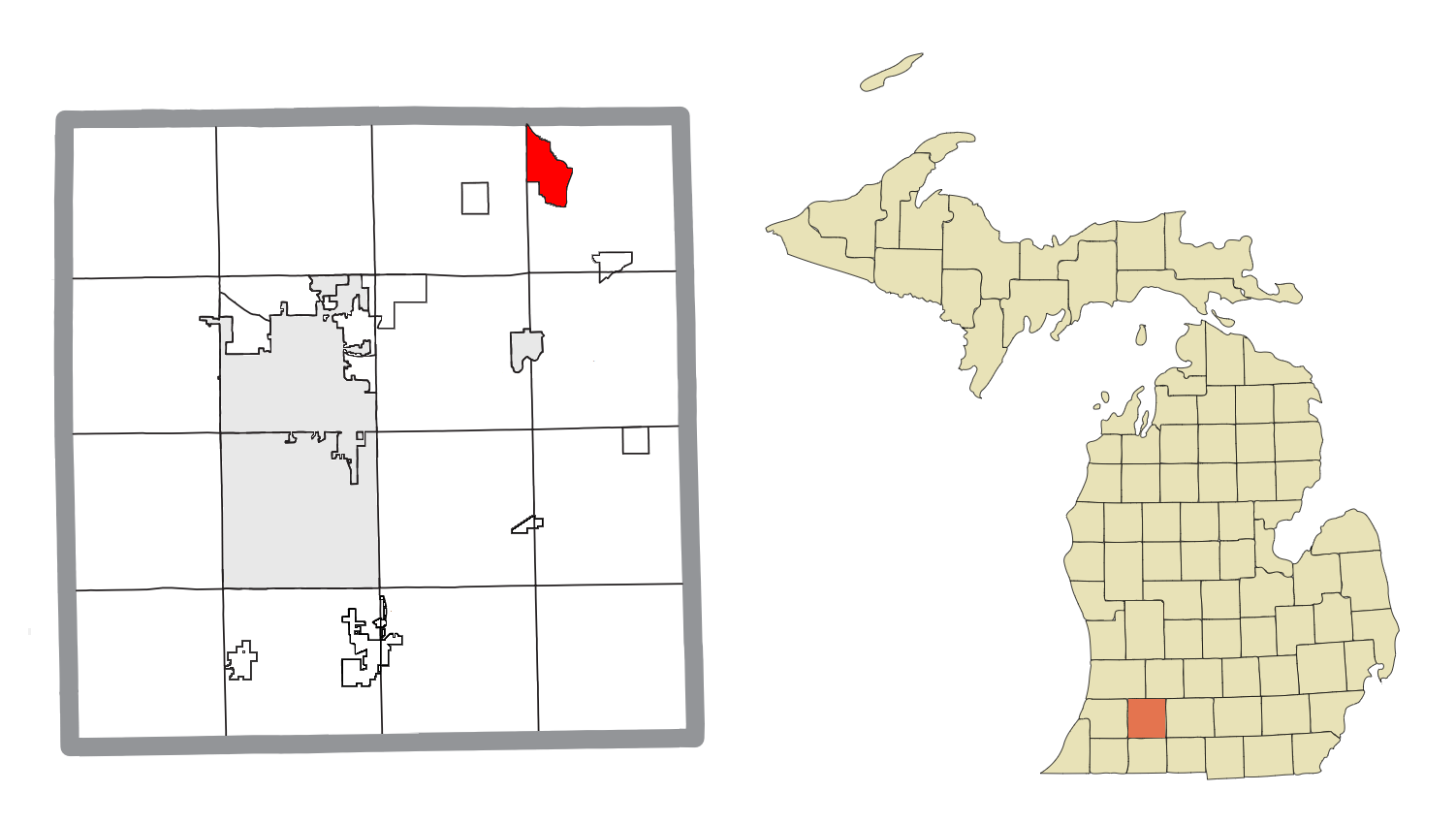
- Location within Kalamazoo County

- Location within the state of Michigan Location within the United States
- Coordinates: 42°23′15″N 85°23′48″W
- Country: United States
- State: Michigan
- County: Kalamazoo
- Township: Ross

Area
  - Total: 3.15 sq mi (8.15 km^{2})
  - Land: 1.35 sq mi (3.50 km^{2})
  - Water: 1.80 sq mi (4.66 km^{2})
- Elevation: 879 ft (268 m)

Population (2020)
  - Total: 1,179
  - Density: 873.0/sq mi (337.06/km^{2})
- Time zone: UTC-5 (Eastern (EST))
  - Summer (DST): UTC-4 (EDT)
- FIPS code: 26-74975
- GNIS feature ID: 1867323

South Gull Lake is a census-designated place (CDP) in Ross Township, Kalamazoo County, in the U.S. state of Michigan. It includes the unincorporated communities of Yorkville, Gull Lake, and Midland Park and does not have any legal status as an incorporated municipality. As of the 2020 census, South Gull Lake had a population of 1,179.

== Geography ==
The CDP is in northeastern Kalamazoo County, in the northwest part of Ross Township, and comprises area around the southern and eastern shores of Gull Lake. The lake extends into Richland Township to the west, and the northern tip crosses into Barry County, areas which are outside the CDP. The community of Yorkville is in the southern part of the CDP at the outlet of the lake (42°22′31″N 85°24′06″W), Gull Lake is at the southeast tip of the lake at 42°22′15″N 85°23′12″W, and Midland Park is on the eastern side of the lake at 42°23′27″N 85°23′08″W. A summer post office named "Yorkville" operated from 1917 to 1939.

M-89 is a state highway that forms the southern edge of the CDP, leading west 3.5 miles (5.6 km) to Richland and east 12 miles (19 km) to Battle Creek. Kalamazoo is 12 miles to the southwest via Richland.

According to the United States Census Bureau, the South Gull Lake CDP has a total area of 3.2 square miles (8.2 km^{2}), of which 1.8 square miles (4.7 km^{2}), or 57.10%, are water. South Gull Lake drains from its outlet at Yorkville via Gull Creek south to the Kalamazoo River.

== Demographics ==
Historical population
Census	Pop.	Note	%±
2020	1,179		—
U.S. Decennial Census

As of the census of 2000, there were 1,526 people, 643 households, and 459 families residing in the CDP. The population density was 1,161.2 inhabitants per square mile (448.3/km^{2}). There were 885 housing units at an average density of 673.4 per square mile (260.0/km^{2}). The racial makeup of the CDP was 99.48% White, 0.13% Native American, 0.07% Asian, and 0.33% from two or more races. Hispanic or Latino of any race were 1.05% of the population.

There were 643 households, out of which 27.2% had children under the age of 18 living with them, 61.7% were married couples living together, 6.4% had a female householder with no husband present, and 28.5% were non-families. 23.6% of all households were made up of individuals, and 9.3% had someone living alone who was 65 years of age or older. The average household size was 2.37 and the average family size was 2.82.

In the CDP, the population was spread out, with 23.4% under the age of 18, 5.4% from 18 to 24, 21.0% from 25 to 44, 34.1% from 45 to 64, and 16.1% who were 65 years of age or older. The median age was 45 years. For every 100 females, there were 94.4 males. For every 100 females age 18 and over, there were 93.9 males.

The median income for a household in the CDP was $65,833, and the median income for a family was $85,848. Males had a median income of $46,932 versus $30,000 for females. The per capita income for the CDP was $45,175. None of the families and 1.6% of the population were living below the poverty line, including no under eighteens and none of those over 64.
