= Dowling, Michigan =

- Census-designated place (CDP) & unincorporated community
- Location within Michigan
- Coordinates: 42°31′21″N 85°15′11″W
- Country: United States
- State: Michigan
- County: Barry
- Township: Baltimore

Area
  - Total: 6.29 sq mi (16.28 km^{2})
  - Land: 6.08 sq mi (15.75 km^{2})
  - Water: 0.20 sq mi (0.53 km^{2})
- Elevation: 952 ft (290 m)

Population (2020)
  - Total: 351
  - Density: 57.7/sq mi (22.29/km^{2})
- Time zone: UTC-5 (Eastern (EST))
  - Summer (DST): UTC-4 (EDT)
- ZIP code: 49050
- Area code: 269
- FIPS code: 26-22900
- GNIS feature ID: 0624850

Dowling is a census-designated place (CDP) in Baltimore Township in Barry County, Michigan, United States. The population was 351 at the 2020 census.

== History ==
The settlement was informally named "Baltimore" as early as 1842 in memory of the home of prominent settlers. A post office named Baltimore was established in May 1850. The name was changed to Dowling in March 1880.

== Geography ==
Dowling is located southeast of the center of Barry County. The center of town is located at the intersection of state highway M-37 and East Dowling Road. M-37 leads north 9 miles (14 km) to Hastings, the Barry County seat, and south 16 miles (26 km) to downtown Battle Creek.

The Baltimore Township office is located 1 mile (1.6 km) east of the center of Dowling. The southern edge of the CDP is the border with Johnstown Township.

According to the United States Census Bureau, the Dowling CDP has a total area of 6.3 square miles (16.3 km^{2}), of which 6.1 square miles (15.7 km^{2}) is land and 2.0 square miles (5.2 km^{2}), or 3.21%, is water, consisting of the northern half of Clear Lake.

== Demographics ==
Historical population
Census	Pop.	Note	%±
2020	351		—
U.S. Decennial Census
