= Austin H. and Frankie A. Dwight Summer House =

- U.S. National Register of Historic Places
- Michigan State Historic Site
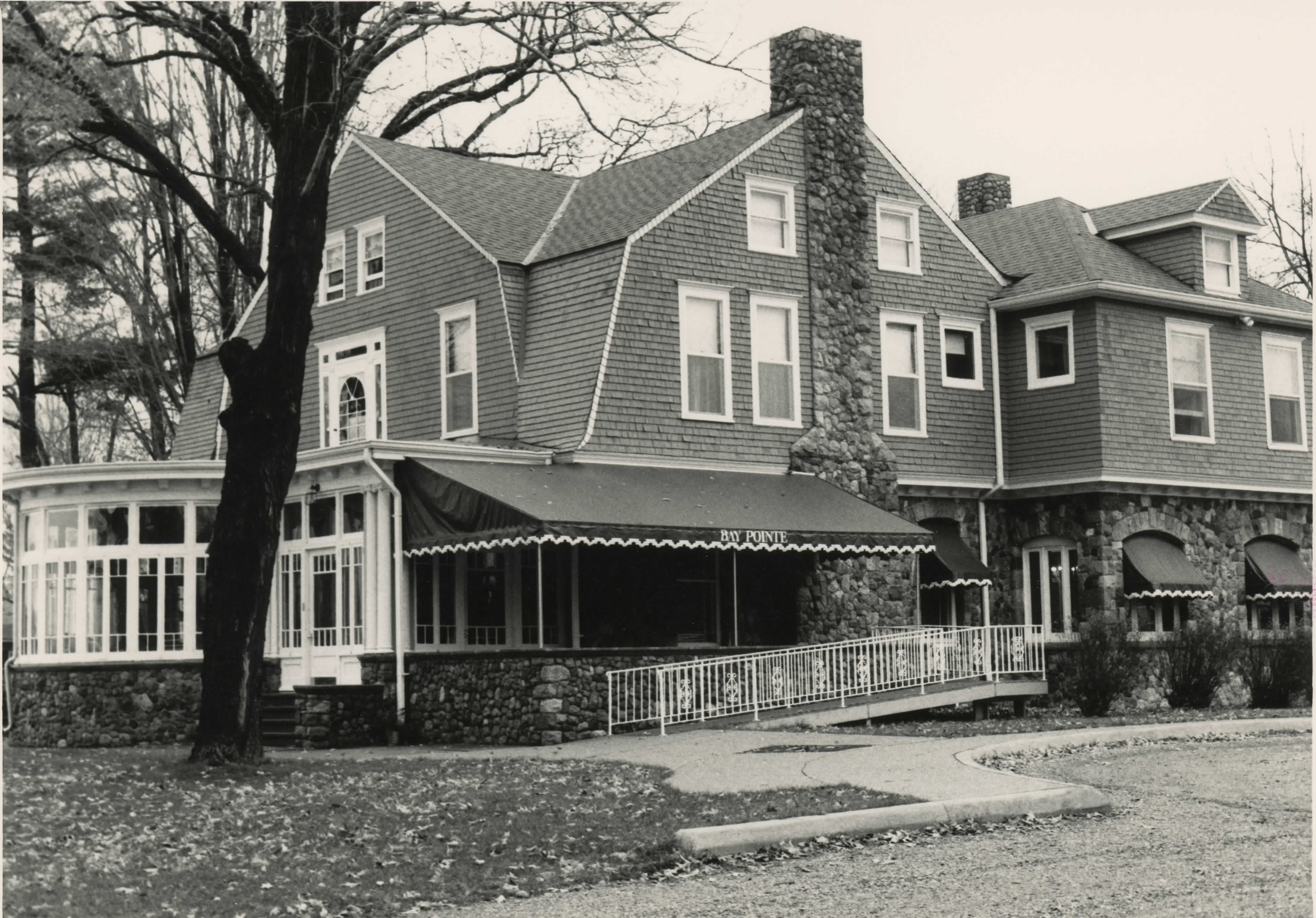
- Bay Pointe Restaurant, 1984

- Location within Michigan Location within the United States
- Interactive map
- Location: 11456 Marsh Rd., Shelbyville, Michigan
- Coordinates: 42°34′56″N 85°30′51″W
- Area: 2 acres (0.81 ha)
- Built: 1901
- Architectural style: Colonial Revival
- Demolished: 1984
- NRHP reference No.: 85000656

Significant dates
- Added to NRHP: March 28, 1985
- Designated MSHS: June 18, 1982

The Austin H. and Frankie A. Dwight Summer House, also known as the Bay Pointe Restaurant, was a building constructed as a private summer home, located on Gun Lake at 11456 Marsh Road in Shelbyville, Michigan. It was designated a Michigan State Historic Site in 1982 and listed on the National Register of Historic Places in 1985. The building was later used as a restaurant, and was demolished in 2004.

== History ==
In 1885, Charles and Elizabeth Morrell bought property on Gun Lake previously used for farming. They turned it into a resort, which they eventually sold to Edmund Noble. In 1899, Noble sold the property to Austin H. Dwight and his wife Frankie. Austin Dwight was a Chicago businessman who became a leading paper manufacturer in Kalamazoo. Between 1901 and 1902, the Dwights constructed this summer home on the property. The Dwights normally lived in this house for six months out of the year until their deaths in 1924 (Frankie) and 1926 (Austin).

After their deaths, the house remained vacant for years, until 1978, when Roy and Jackie Martin purchased house and surrounding property and renovated the structure. In 1983, the Martins opened the Bay Pointe Restaurant in the Dwight Summer House. The property changed ownership, and in 2004 the structure was demolished and a new Bay Pointe Inn erected at the site.

== Description ==
The Dwight summer residence was a 2 1/2-story wood frame Colonial Revival structure with a mix of gambrel and hip roof sections. It was clad with cobblestones on the first floor with wooden shingling above. It had a massive fieldstone chimney, a large bay window, and an enclosed porch. The house was significant both for its architecture and or the use of advanced engineering techniques, where timber trusses with iron tie rods were used to house a large public space in the first floor.
