= John Carveth House =

Historic house in Michigan, United States

- U.S. National Register of Historic Places
- Michigan State Historic Site
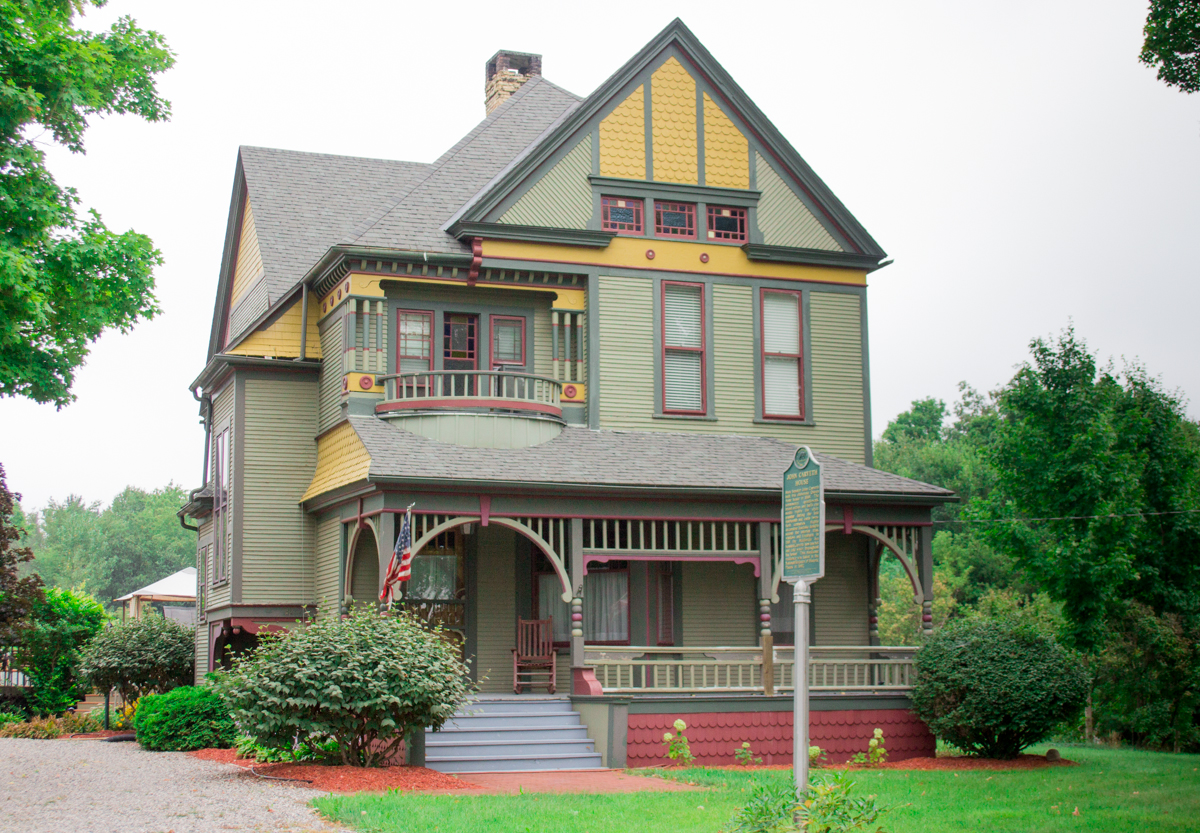

- Location within Michigan Location within the United States
- Interactive map
- Location: 614 W. Main St., Middleville, Michigan
- Coordinates: 42°42′40″N 85°28′27″W
- Area: 5 acres (2.0 ha)
- Built: 1886
- Architectural style: Queen Anne
- NRHP reference No.: 92001076

Significant dates
- Added to NRHP: August 21, 1992
- Designated MSHS: December 12, 1992

The John Carveth House, also known as the Aaron Clark House or the Lone Willow Farm, is a private house located at 614 West Main Street in Middleville, Michigan. It was designated a Michigan State Historic Site in 1992 and listed on the National Register of Historic Places in 1992.

== History ==
John Carveth was born in 1841 in Saranac, Michigan. He worked for a time as a teacher, but in 1867 moved to Middleville to read law. He was admitted to the bar in 1868 and established a practice in Middleville, and in 1885-86 served as a state senator from the district. In 1886, he built the house for his own use. Carveth lived here until 1895, when he sold the house to his brother-in-law and one-time law partner, Aaron Clark.

== Description ==
The John Carveth House is an elaborate, asymmetrical two-story Queen Anne structure. It has a wood frame with a steep cross-gable and hip roof and sits on an ashlar fieldstone foundation. The house is covered with clapboard siding, with additional patterned shingling and decorative siding in the gables. A broad veranda features decorative spindlework, broad arches, and bull's eye motifs, as does the balvony above. Many first floor windows contain an upper sash with tinted margin lights flanking a clear center light. The interior boasts decorative Eastlake designs around windows, fireplace, and other trim.

A two-story frame side-gable carriage house/barn is located near the house, as is small milking parlor and a modern garage.
