= Delton, Michigan =

- Census-designated place (CDP) & unincorporated community
- Location within Michigan
- Coordinates: 42°29′59″N 85°24′29″W
- Country: United States
- State: Michigan
- County: Barry
- Township: Barry

Area
  - Total: 2.55 sq mi (6.61 km^{2})
  - Land: 2.22 sq mi (5.74 km^{2})
  - Water: 0.34 sq mi (0.87 km^{2})
- Elevation: 947 ft (289 m)

Population (2020)
  - Total: 854
  - Density: 385.5/sq mi (148.86/km^{2})
- Time zone: UTC-5 (Eastern (EST))
  - Summer (DST): UTC-4 (EDT)
- ZIP code: 49046
- Area code: Area code 269
- FIPS code: 26-21560
- GNIS feature ID: 0624538

Delton is a census-designated place (CDP) in Barry Township in Barry County, Michigan, United States. The population was 854 at the 2020 census.

== Geography ==
Delton is located in southwestern Barry County. It is bordered to the north by Hope Township. To the west the CDP extends slightly into Prairieville Township, Cloverdale and Cedar Creek. State highway M-43 runs through the town center, leading northeast 14 miles (23 km) to Hastings and southwest 19 miles (31 km) to downtown Kalamazoo.

According to the United States Census Bureau, the Delton CDP has a total area of 2.2 square miles (5.8 km^{2}), of which 2.2 square miles (5.6 km^{2}) is land and 0.077 square miles (0.2 km^{2}), or 2.99%, is water. The eastern end of Crooked Lake occupies the western part of the CDP.

== Demographics ==
Historical population
Census	Pop.	Note	%±
2020	854		—
U.S. Decennial Census
