= Irving Township, Michigan =

- Township
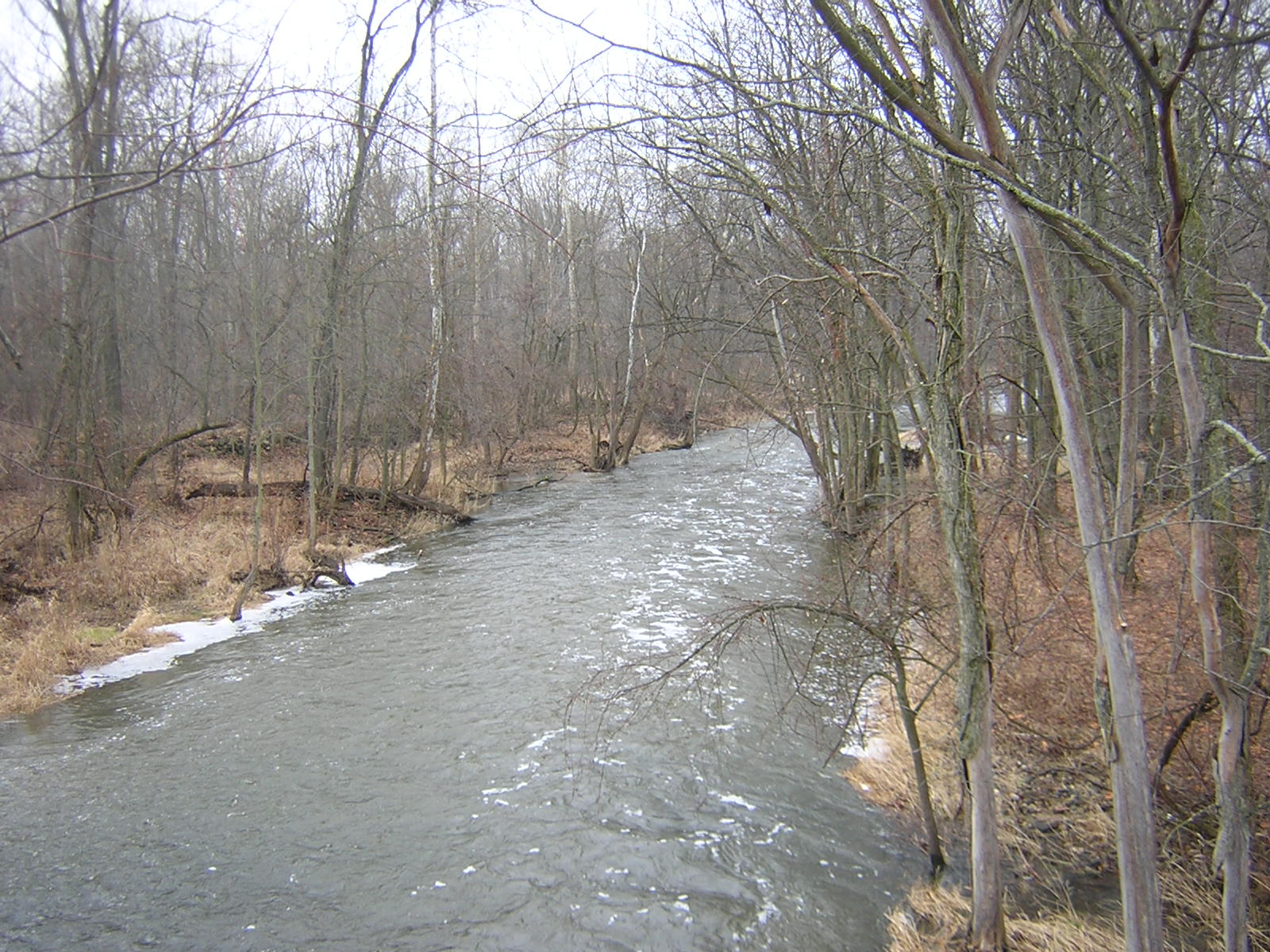
- The Thornapple River just downstream from Irving Dam in the township

- Location within the state of Michigan
- Coordinates: 42°43′33″N 85°20′56″W
- Country: United States
- State: Michigan
- County: Barry

Area
  - Total: 36.1 sq mi (93.5 km^{2})
  - Land: 35.8 sq mi (92.6 km^{2})
  - Water: 0.35 sq mi (0.9 km^{2})
- Elevation: 866 ft (264 m)

Population (2020)
  - Total: 3,734
  - Density: 104/sq mi (40.3/km^{2})
- Time zone: UTC-5 (Eastern (EST))
  - Summer (DST): UTC-4 (EDT)
- FIPS code: 26-41120
- GNIS feature ID: 1626530
- Website: www.irvingtownship.org

Irving Township is a civil township of Barry County in the U.S. state of Michigan. The population was 3,734 at the 2020 census.

== History ==
Irving Township was established in 1839.

== Geography ==
Irving Dam area

According to the United States Census Bureau, the township has a total area of 36.1 square miles (93.5 km^{2}), of which 35.8 square miles (92.6 km^{2}) is land and 0.35 square miles (0.9 km^{2}), or 0.92%, is water. The Thornapple River, a tributary of the Grand River, runs through the southwest corner of the township, and there is a dam operated by the Commonwealth Power Company across it in the unincorporated village of Irving within the township.

== Demographics ==
As of the census of 2000, there were 2,682 people, 901 households, and 746 families residing in the township. The population density was 74.7 inhabitants per square mile (28.8/km^{2}). There were 931 housing units at an average density of 25.9 per square mile (10.0/km^{2}). The racial makeup of the township was 97.13% White, 0.63% African American, 0.41% Native American, 0.22% Asian, 0.41% from other races, and 1.19% from two or more races. Hispanic or Latino of any race were 0.67% of the population.

There were 901 households, out of which 42.8% had children under the age of 18 living with them, 72.0% were married couples living together, 5.4% had a female householder with no husband present, and 17.1% were non-families. 12.9% of all households were made up of individuals, and 3.4% had someone living alone who was 65 years of age or older. The average household size was 2.98 and the average family size was 3.25.

In the township the population was spread out, with 31.4% under the age of 18, 6.9% from 18 to 24, 33.7% from 25 to 44, 21.3% from 45 to 64, and 6.7% who were 65 years of age or older. The median age was 34 years. For every 100 females, there were 103.8 males. For every 100 females age 18 and over, there were 106.2 males.

The median income for a household in the township was $50,532, and the median income for a family was $52,358. Males had a median income of $40,500 versus $25,000 for females. The per capita income for the township was $17,523. About 1.5% of families and 1.9% of the population were below the poverty line, including 0.2% of those under age 18 and 3.3% of those age 65 or over.
