= Castleton Township, Michigan =

- Township
- Location within the state of Michigan
- Coordinates: 42°37′22″N 85°7′31″W
- Country: United States
- State: Michigan
- County: Barry

Area
  - Total: 35.8 sq mi (92.6 km^{2})
  - Land: 35.0 sq mi (90.6 km^{2})
  - Water: 0.81 sq mi (2.1 km^{2})
- Elevation: 879 ft (268 m)

Population (2020)
  - Total: 3,329
  - Density: 95.2/sq mi (36.7/km^{2})
- Time zone: UTC-5 (Eastern (EST))
  - Summer (DST): UTC-4 (EDT)
- FIPS code: 26-13960
- GNIS feature ID: 1626044

Castleton Township is a civil township of Barry County in the U.S. state of Michigan. The population was 3,329 at the 2020 census. Castleton Township was formed on February 16, 1842.

== History ==
A grist mill was built along the banks of Highbank Creek in the township in 1856. There was later a post office named Barryville at this site from 1857 until 1873.

Coats Grove was located five miles northeast of Hastings on the Chicago, Kalamazoo and Saginaw Railway.

== Geography ==
According to the United States Census Bureau, the township has a total area of 35.8 square miles (92.6 km^{2}), of which 35.0 square miles (90.6 km^{2}) is land and 0.81 square miles (2.1 km^{2}), or 2.23%, is water.

== Demographics ==
As of the census of 2000, there were 3,475 people, 1,339 households, and 969 families residing in the township. The population density was 98.9 inhabitants per square mile (38.2/km^{2}). There were 1,477 housing units at an average density of 42.0 per square mile (16.2/km^{2}). The racial makeup of the township was 97.27% White, 0.09% African American, 0.58% Native American, 0.29% Asian, 0.17% from other races, and 1.61% from two or more races. Hispanic or Latino of any race were 0.89% of the population.

There were 1,339 households, out of which 34.9% had children under the age of 18 living with them, 54.7% were married couples living together, 12.0% had a female householder with no husband present, and 27.6% were non-families. 22.4% of all households were made up of individuals, and 8.1% had someone living alone who was 65 years of age or older. The average household size was 2.60 and the average family size was 3.01.

In the township the population was spread out, with 27.8% under the age of 18, 8.9% from 18 to 24, 28.3% from 25 to 44, 22.7% from 45 to 64, and 12.3% who were 65 years of age or older. The median age was 35 years. For every 100 females, there were 96.1 males. For every 100 females age 18 and over, there were 95.5 males.

The median income for a household in the township was $33,929, and the median income for a family was $37,039. Males had a median income of $32,087 versus $23,568 for females. The per capita income for the township was $16,534. About 7.4% of families and 9.1% of the population were below the poverty line, including 9.3% of those under age 18 and 7.1% of those age 65 or over.
