= Assyria Township, Michigan =

- Township
- Location within the state of Michigan
- Coordinates: 42°27′20″N 85°8′26″W
- Country: United States
- State: Michigan
- County: Barry

Area
  - Total: 36.3 sq mi (94.1 km^{2})
  - Land: 35.9 sq mi (92.9 km^{2})
  - Water: 0.46 sq mi (1.2 km^{2})
- Elevation: 928 ft (283 m)

Population (2020)
  - Total: 1,992
  - Density: 55/sq mi (21.4/km^{2})
- Time zone: UTC-5 (Eastern (EST))
  - Summer (DST): UTC-4 (EDT)
- FIPS code: 26-03860
- GNIS feature ID: 1625855
- Website: assyriatwpmi.gov

Assyria Township is a civil township of Barry County in the U.S. state of Michigan. As of the 2020 census, the township population was 1,992. The unincorporated community of Assyria Center is located on M-66 at the corner of Tasker Road.

== Communities ==
- Ceylon was the name of a post office in the township from 1888 until 1903.

== Geography ==
According to the United States Census Bureau, the township has a total area of 36.3 square miles (94.1 km^{2}), of which 35.9 square miles (92.9 km^{2}) is land and 0.46 square miles (1.2 km^{2}), or 1.30%, is water. The largest lakes are Loon Lake of 36 acres (150,000 m^{2}), Taylor Lake of 32 acres (130,000 m^{2}), Metcalf Lake of 30 acres (120,000 m^{2}), High Hill Lake of 29 acres (120,000 m^{2}), West Lake of 28 acres (110,000 m^{2}), Cassidy Lake and Grass Lake of 25 acres (100,000 m^{2}). In 2009 there were 75.06 miles (120.80 km) of county/state roads and 3.58 miles (5.76 km) of private roads.

== Demographics ==
As of the census of 2000, there were 1,912 people, 714 households, and 564 families residing in the township. The population density was 53.0 inhabitants per square mile (20.5/km^{2}). There were 744 housing units at an average density of 20.6 per square mile (8.0/km^{2}). The racial makeup of the township was 97.65% White, 0.63% African American, 0.63% Native American, 0.16% Asian, 0.26% from other races, and 0.68% from two or more races. Hispanic or Latino of any race were 1.10% of the population.

There were 714 households, out of which 31.2% had children under the age of 18 living with them, 69.9% were married couples living together, 4.5% had a female householder with no husband present, and 20.9% were non-families. 16.8% of all households were made up of individuals, and 5.5% had someone living alone who was 65 years of age or older. The average household size was 2.68 and the average family size was 3.02.

In the township the population was spread out, with 24.2% under the age of 18, 7.3% from 18 to 24, 27.6% from 25 to 44, 29.1% from 45 to 64, and 11.8% who were 65 years of age or older. The median age was 40 years. For every 100 females, there were 105.8 males. For every 100 females age 18 and over, there were 106.7 males.

The median income for a household in the township was $50,192, and the median income for a family was $53,188. Males had a median income of $39,375 versus $26,012 for females. The per capita income for the township was $20,908. About 1.4% of families and 2.8% of the population were below the poverty line, including 1.1% of those under age 18 and 6.5% of those age 65 or over.

In 2009 the number of addressed structures was 875. The 2008 parcel assessment shows 1069 real properties at a SEV of $77,567,100 and 28 personal properties at a SEV of $1,019,300 personal.

== Notable people ==
- Lyman James Briggs - engineer, physicist and administrator
