= Ross Township, Michigan =

- Civil township
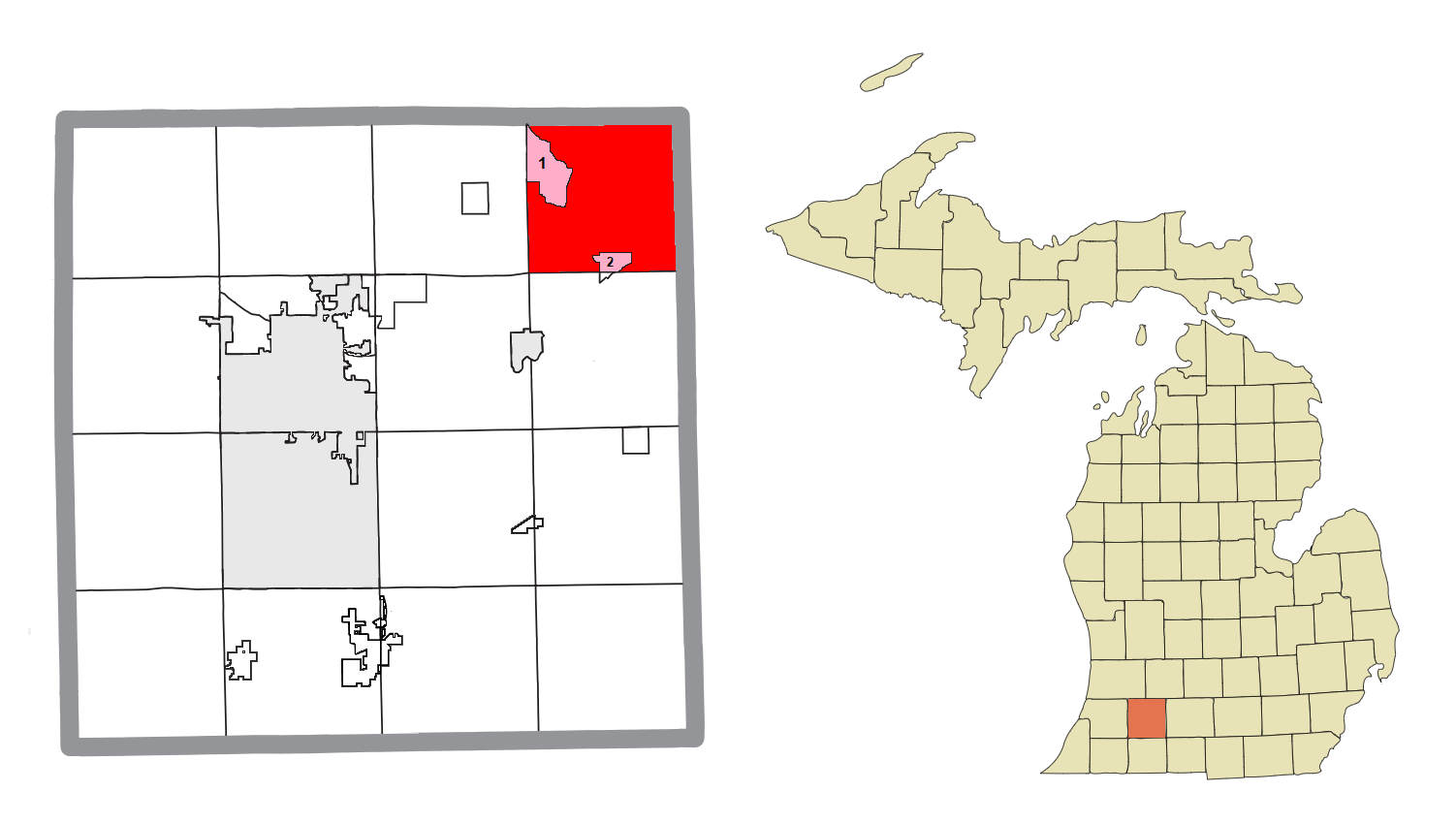
- Location within Kalamazoo County and the administered CDP or South Gull Lake (1) and portion of the village of Augusta (2)

- Location within the state of Michigan Location within the United States
- Coordinates: 42°21′58″N 85°21′48″W
- Country: United States
- State: Michigan
- County: Kalamazoo

Area
  - Total: 36.0 sq mi (93.3 km^{2})
  - Land: 33.3 sq mi (86.3 km^{2})
  - Water: 2.7 sq mi (7.0 km^{2})
- Elevation: 883 ft (269 m)

Population (2020)
  - Total: 4,851
  - Density: 146/sq mi (56.2/km^{2})
- Time zone: UTC-5 (Eastern (EST))
  - Summer (DST): UTC-4 (EDT)
- FIPS code: 26-077-69820
- GNIS feature ID: 1627009
- Website: rosstownshipmi.gov

Ross Township is a township in Kalamazoo County in the U.S. state of Michigan. The population was 4,851 at the 2020 census, up from 4,664 at the 2010 census.

== Communities ==
- The village of Augusta is mostly within the township on the southern boundary with Charleston Township.
- South Gull Lake is a census-designated place within the township defined for statistical purposes. It encompasses the unincorporated communities of Yorkville, Gull Lake, and Midland Park.
- The village of Richland is to the west, in the adjacent Richland Township.
- The city of Battle Creek is adjacent to the southeast and Bedford Charter Township to the east.
- The city of Kalamazoo is 14 miles (23 km) to the southwest.

== Geography ==
According to the United States Census Bureau, the township has a total area of 36.0 square miles (93.3 km^{2}), of which 33.3 square miles (86.3 km^{2}) are land and 2.7 square miles (7.0 km^{2}), or 7.46%, are water. Most of the water area in the township is within Gull Lake, the southeast half of which occupies the northwest part of the township. The township is within the Kalamazoo River watershed.

== Demographics ==
As of the census of 2000, there were 5,047 people, 2,031 households, and 1,476 families residing in the township. The population density was 151.5 inhabitants per square mile (58.5/km^{2}). There were 2,334 housing units at an average density of 70.1 per square mile (27.1/km^{2}). The racial makeup of the township was 97.36% White, 0.32% African American, 0.55% Native American, 0.38% Asian, 0.30% from other races, and 1.09% from two or more races. Hispanic or Latino of any race were 1.27% of the population.

There were 2,031 households, out of which 30.3% had children under the age of 18 living with them, 62.5% were married couples living together, 7.1% had a female householder with no husband present, and 27.3% were non-families. 22.1% of all households were made up of individuals, and 7.6% had someone living alone who was 65 years of age or older. The average household size was 2.47 and the average family size was 2.89.

In the township the population was spread out, with 24.6% under the age of 18, 5.1% from 18 to 24, 26.8% from 25 to 44, 30.4% from 45 to 64, and 13.0% who were 65 years of age or older. The median age was 42 years. For every 100 females, there were 97.5 males. For every 100 females age 18 and over, there were 93.6 males.

The median income for a household in the township was $58,446, and the median income for a family was $67,831. Males had a median income of $45,139 versus $31,020 for females. The per capita income for the township was $32,715. About 1.8% of families and 3.2% of the population were below the poverty line, including 2.2% of those under age 18 and 1.8% of those age 65 or over.
