= Maple Grove Township, Barry County, Michigan =

Maple Grove Township, Michigan
- Township
- Location within the state of Michigan
- Coordinates: 42°33′8″N 85°7′55″W
- Country: United States
- State: Michigan
- County: Barry

Area
  - Total: 36.0 sq mi (93.3 km^{2})
  - Land: 35.9 sq mi (93.0 km^{2})
  - Water: 0.12 sq mi (0.3 km^{2})
- Elevation: 958 ft (292 m)

Population (2020)
  - Total: 1,599
  - Density: 44.5/sq mi (17.2/km^{2})
- Time zone: UTC-5 (Eastern (EST))
  - Summer (DST): UTC-4 (EDT)
- FIPS code: 26-50960
- GNIS feature ID: 1626674

Maple Grove Township is a civil township of Barry County in the U.S. state of Michigan. The population was 1,599 at the 2020 census. The unincorporated community of Maple Grove is located within the township.

== Geography ==
According to the United States Census Bureau, the township has a total area of 36.0 square miles (93.3 km^{2}), of which 35.9 square miles (93.0 km^{2}) is land, and 0.12 square miles (0.3 km^{2}) (0.36%) is water.

== Demographics ==
As of the census of 2000, there were 1,471 people, 510 households, and 424 families residing in the township. The population density was 41.0 inhabitants per square mile (15.8/km^{2}). There were 540 housing units at an average density of 15.0 per square mile (5.8/km^{2}). The racial makeup of the township was 97.89% White, 0.61% African American, 0.07% Native American, 0.54% Asian, 0.14% from other races, and 0.75% from two or more races. Hispanic or Latino of any race were 0.34% of the population.

There were 510 households, out of which 38.6% had children under the age of 18 living with them, 75.5% were married couples living together, 3.9% had a female householder with no husband present, and 16.7% were non-families. 14.3% of all households were made up of individuals, and 5.3% had someone living alone who was 65 years of age or older. The average household size was 2.86 and the average family size was 3.15.

In the township the population was spread out, with 29.2% under the age of 18, 6.4% from 18 to 24, 27.7% from 25 to 44, 27.3% from 45 to 64, and 9.5% who were 65 years of age or older. The median age was 37 years. For every 100 females, there were 104.6 males. For every 100 females age 18 and over, there were 104.7 males.

The median income for a household in the township was $51,200, and the median income for a family was $54,432. Males had a median income of $40,625 versus $26,750 for females. The per capita income for the township was $18,512. About 3.4% of families and 5.8% of the population were below the poverty line, including 6.7% of those under age 18 and 2.9% of those age 65 or over.
