= Prairieville Township, Michigan =

- Township
- Location within the state of Michigan
- Coordinates: 42°28′27″N 85°29′0″W
- Country: United States
- State: Michigan
- County: Barry

Area
  - Total: 36.5 sq mi (94.5 km^{2})
  - Land: 32.8 sq mi (84.9 km^{2})
  - Water: 3.7 sq mi (9.5 km^{2})
- Elevation: 912 ft (278 m)

Population (2020)
  - Total: 3,334
  - Density: 102/sq mi (39.3/km^{2})
- Time zone: UTC-5 (Eastern (EST))
  - Summer (DST): UTC-4 (EDT)
- FIPS code: 26-66260
- GNIS feature ID: 1626942
- Website: prairievilletwp-mi.gov

Prairieville Township is a civil township of Barry County in the U.S. state of Michigan. The population was 3,334 at the 2020 census.

== Communities ==
- Cressey's Corners was established in 1854. It had a post office from 1873 until 1954.

== Geography ==
According to the United States Census Bureau, the township has a total area of 36.5 square miles (94.5 km^{2}), of which 32.8 square miles (84.9 km^{2}) is land and 3.7 square miles (9.5 km^{2}), or 10.11%, is water.

== Demographics ==
As of the census of 2000, there were 3,175 people, 1,223 households, and 922 families residing in the township. The population density was 95.3 inhabitants per square mile (36.8/km^{2}). There were 1,476 housing units at an average density of 44.3 per square mile (17.1/km^{2}). The racial makeup of the township was 97.23% White, 0.22% African American, 0.38% Native American, 0.35% Asian, 0.57% from other races, and 1.26% from two or more races. Hispanic or Latino of any race were 1.39% of the population.

There were 1,223 households, out of which 30.7% had children under the age of 18 living with them, 65.6% were married couples living together, 6.7% had a female householder with no husband present, and 24.6% were non-families. 18.7% of all households were made up of individuals, and 6.7% had someone living alone who was 65 years of age or older. The average household size was 2.59 and the average family size was 2.93.

In the township the population was spread out, with 24.7% under the age of 18, 5.9% from 18 to 24, 28.7% from 25 to 44, 29.7% from 45 to 64, and 11.0% who were 65 years of age or older. The median age was 40 years. For every 100 females, there were 100.2 males. For every 100 females age 18 and over, there were 102.1 males.

The median income for a household in the township was $51,071, and the median income for a family was $54,907. Males had a median income of $42,270 versus $25,270 for females. The per capita income for the township was $22,838. About 2.2% of families and 2.9% of the population were below the poverty line, including 3.3% of those under age 18 and none of those age 65 or over.
