= Hope Township, Barry County, Michigan =

Hope Township, Michigan
- Township
- Location within the state of Michigan
- Coordinates: 42°33′6″N 85°22′31″W
- Country: United States
- State: Michigan
- County: Barry

Area
  - Total: 36.1 sq mi (93.5 km^{2})
  - Land: 32.5 sq mi (84.1 km^{2})
  - Water: 3.6 sq mi (9.4 km^{2})
- Elevation: 974 ft (297 m)

Population (2020)
  - Total: 3,154
  - Density: 97.1/sq mi (37.5/km^{2})
- Time zone: UTC-5 (Eastern (EST))
  - Summer (DST): UTC-4 (EDT)
- ZIP code: 49035 (Cloverdale, PO Box only), 49046 (Delton), 49050 (Dowling), 49058 (Hastings)
- FIPS code: 26-39120
- GNIS feature ID: 1626488
- Website: www.hopetwp.com

Hope Township is a civil township of Barry County in the U.S. state of Michigan. As per the 2020 census, its population was 3,154.

== History ==
In the 1830s and 1840s, the area around Hope, especially along the Cedar Creek, was a center of Protestant missionary work among the Potomatami. Hope was organized as a township in 1850.

== Communities ==
- Cedar Creek is a locale in the southeast part of the township at 42°31′13″N 85°19′39″W In 1849, Isaac LaGrange built the first sawmill in the township on the Cedar Creek. A post office named Cedar Creek was established in 1850, with LaGrange as the first postmaster. The office was permanently closed in December 1904.
- Cloverdale is an unincorporated community within the township on Long Lake served by a U.S. post office with a ZIP code of 49035.
- Schultz (also spelled Shultz) is an unincorporated community in the township at 42°34′50″N 85°20′47″W. It was a station on the Chicago, Kalamazoo and Saginaw Railway. A post office operated from November 24, 1888, until July 31, 1933.

== Geography ==
According to the United States Census Bureau, the township has a total area of 36.1 square miles (93.5 km^{2}), of which 32.5 square miles (84.1 km^{2}) is land and 3.6 square miles (9.4 km^{2}), or 10.01%, is water.

== Demographics ==
As of the census of 2000, there were 3,283 people, 1,252 households, and 942 families residing in the township. The population density was 100.7 inhabitants per square mile (38.9/km^{2}). There were 1,659 housing units at an average density of 50.9 per square mile (19.7/km^{2}). The racial makeup of the township was 97.41% white, 0.24% African American, 0.76% Native American, 0.15% Asian, 0.27% from other races, and 1.16% from two or more races. Hispanic or Latino of any race were 1.16% of the population.

There were 1,252 households, out of which 32.6% had children under the age of 18 living with them, 62.4% were married couples living together, 7.5% had a female householder with no husband present, and 24.7% were non-families. 20.0% of all households were made up of individuals, and 7.2% had someone living alone who was 65 years of age or older. The average household size was 2.62 and the average family size was 2.98.

In the township the population was spread out, with 26.0% under the age of 18, 7.0% from 18 to 24, 28.9% from 25 to 44, 26.6% from 45 to 64, and 11.4% who were 65 years of age or older. The median age was 39 years. For every 100 females, there were 103.5 males. For every 100 females age 18 and over, there were 104.2 males.

The median income for a household in the township was $41,983, and the median income for a family was $51,337. Males had a median income of $35,160 versus $25,436 for females. The per capita income for the township was $19,399. About 6.8% of families and 6.8% of the population were below the poverty line, including 11.9% of those under age 18 and none of those age 65 or over.
