= Barry County, Michigan =

County in Michigan, United States

- County
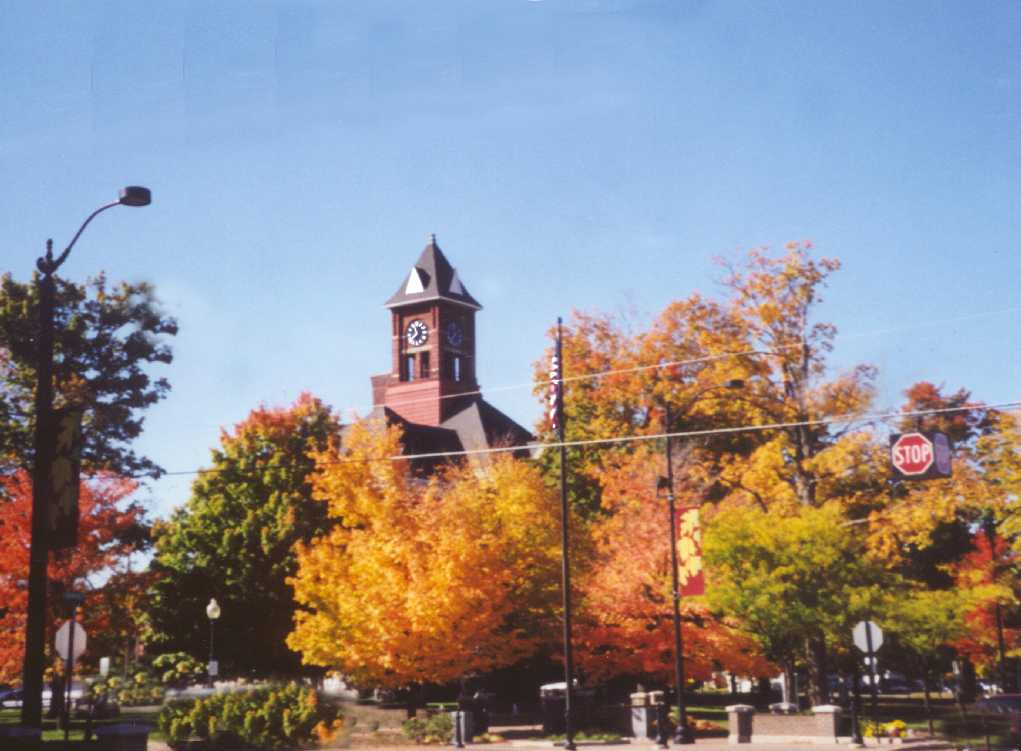
- Barry County Courthouse

- Location within the U.S. state of Michigan
- Coordinates: 42°36′N 85°19′W
- Country: United States
- State: Michigan
- Founded: April 29, 1829 (established); March 15, 1839 (organized)
- Named for: William Taylor Barry
- Seat: Hastings
- Largest city: Hastings

Area
  - Total: 577 sq mi (1,490 km^{2})
  - Land: 553 sq mi (1,430 km^{2})
  - Water: 24 sq mi (62 km^{2}) 4.2%

Population (2020)
  - Total: 62,423
  - Estimate (2025): 63,991 ▲
  - Density: 113/sq mi (43.6/km^{2})
- Time zone: UTC−5 (Eastern)
  - Summer (DST): UTC−4 (EDT)
- Congressional district: 2nd
- Website: https://www.barrycounty.org/

Barry County is a county in the U.S. state of Michigan. As of the 2020 United States census, the population was 62,423. The county seat is Hastings.

== History ==
Before the present era, the Michigan peninsula was long occupied by bands of the Potowatomi and Ojibwe of the Lake Superior Band of Chippewa Indians. The United States government forced the tribes to cede their extensive territories to the federal government, in exchange for annuities and small reservations. The federally recognized Match-E-Be-Nash-She-Wish Band of Pottowatomi has a reservation in Allegan County, just west of Barry County.

Barry County was described and delineated by act of the Territorial legislature on April 29, 1829, carved out of previously unorganized lands in the Territory. It was named to honor William Taylor Barry, who was serving as United States Postmaster General at the time of the county's proclamation. Barry was one of US President Andrew Jackson's cabinet members who were memorialized in names of ten Michigan counties, the "cabinet counties".

By 1839, the Territory had been admitted into the Union as Michigan State. In 1839, the Michigan State Legislature approved the organization of Barry County as an independent entity.

In the early years of the twentieth century, petroleum deposits of varying magnitudes were discovered and developed in Michigan's Lower Peninsula. This discovery was made in Barry County in 1939; similar discoveries in adjacent counties ranged from 1937 (Allegan County) to 1972 (Eaton County). Identifiable petroleum deposits had been identified in every county adjacent to Barry by 1972.

== Geography ==
According to the US Census Bureau, the county has a total area of 577 square miles (1,490 km^{2}), of which 553 square miles (1,430 km^{2}) is land and 24 square miles (62 km^{2}) (4.2%) is water.

=== Adjacent counties ===
- Ionia County – northeast
- Eaton County – east
- Calhoun County – southeast
- Kalamazoo County – southwest
- Allegan County – west
- Kent County – northwest

== Transportation ==
=== Major highways ===
- M-37 – enters NW part of county running south from Kent County. Runs S and SE to Hastings; runs south and SSE from Hastings to Calhoun County.
- M-43 – enters from Kalamazoo. Runs north and east through Delton, Hastings and Carlton to intersection with M43, east of Woodland in NE corner of Barry County.
- M-50 – enters NE tip of county at Woodbury. Runs west and north to Ionia County.
- M-66 – enters SE corner of county running N from Calhoun County. Runs north and NE through eastern portion of county. Passes Nashville to NE corner of county; exits to Eaton County at Woodbury running east.
- M-78 – runs SW across extreme southeastern tip of county, entering from Eaton County, exiting to Calhoun County.
- M-79 – runs west from its intersection with M66 at Nashville to its intersection with M37, SE of Hastings.
- M-89 – runs SE across the southwestern tip of county, from Allegan County to Kalamazoo County.
- M-179 – enters west portion of county from Allegan County. Runs east to Hastings.

=== Railroads ===
There were once several minor railroads through the county; at present, there are none. The only railroad left in the county is a two-mile section owned by CSX Transportation, running through the northeastern corner of Woodland Township.

== Demographics ==
Historical population
Census	Pop.	Note	%±
1840	1,078		—
1850	5,072		370.5%
1860	13,858		173.2%
1870	22,199		60.2%
1880	25,317		14.0%
1890	23,783		−6.1%
1900	22,514		−5.3%
1910	22,633		0.5%
1920	21,383		−5.5%
1930	20,928		−2.1%
1940	22,613		8.1%
1950	26,183		15.8%
1960	31,738		21.2%
1970	38,166		20.3%
1980	45,781		20.0%
1990	50,057		9.3%
2000	56,755		13.4%
2010	59,173		4.3%
2020	62,423		5.5%
2025 (est.)	63,991	▲	2.5%
US Decennial Census; 1790-1960 1900-1990; 1990-2000 2010-2018

=== Racial and ethnic composition ===
Barry County, Michigan – Racial and ethnic composition Note: the US Census treats Hispanic/Latino as an ethnic category. This table excludes Latinos from the racial categories and assigns them to a separate category. Hispanics/Latinos may be of any race.
Race / Ethnicity (NH = Non-Hispanic)	Pop 1980	Pop 1990	Pop 2000	Pop 2010	Pop 2020	% 1980	% 1990	% 2000	% 2010	% 2020
White alone (NH)	45,008	49,095	54,795	56,487	56,779	98.31%	98.08%	96.55%	95.46%	90.96%
Black or African American alone (NH)	66	103	137	205	295	0.14%	0.21%	0.24%	0.35%	0.47%
Native American or Alaska Native alone (NH)	174	183	241	251	221	0.38%	0.37%	0.42%	0.42%	0.35%
Asian alone (NH)	76	143	151	212	245	0.17%	0.29%	0.27%	0.36%	0.39%
Native Hawaiian or Pacific Islander alone (NH)	x	x	5	5	15	x	x	0.01%	0.01%	0.02%
Other race alone (NH)	37	12	46	25	198	0.08%	0.02%	0.08%	0.04%	0.32%
Mixed race or Multiracial (NH)	x	x	549	652	2,528	x	x	0.97%	1.10%	4.05%
Hispanic or Latino (any race)	420	521	831	1,336	2,142	0.92%	1.04%	1.46%	2.26%	3.43%
Total	45,781	50,057	56,755	59,173	62,423	100.00%	100.00%	100.00%	100.00%	100.00%

=== 2020 census ===
As of the 2020 census, the county had a population of 62,423. The median age was 42.5 years. 22.7% of residents were under the age of 18 and 19.0% of residents were 65 years of age or older. For every 100 females there were 99.8 males, and for every 100 females age 18 and over there were 98.9 males age 18 and over.

The racial makeup of the county was 92.1% White, 0.5% Black or African American, 0.4% American Indian and Alaska Native, 0.4% Asian, <0.1% Native Hawaiian and Pacific Islander, 1.2% from some other race, and 5.4% from two or more races. Hispanic or Latino residents of any race comprised 3.4% of the population.

12.9% of residents lived in urban areas, while 87.1% lived in rural areas.

There were 24,076 households in the county, of which 29.2% had children under the age of 18 living in them. Of all households, 57.0% were married-couple households, 16.3% were households with a male householder and no spouse or partner present, and 19.3% were households with a female householder and no spouse or partner present. About 22.9% of all households were made up of individuals and 11.0% had someone living alone who was 65 years of age or older.

There were 27,351 housing units, of which 12.0% were vacant. Among occupied housing units, 83.4% were owner-occupied and 16.6% were renter-occupied. The homeowner vacancy rate was 1.0% and the rental vacancy rate was 5.1%.

=== 2010 census ===
As of the 2010 United States census, there were 59,173 people living in the county. 96.9% were White, 0.5% Native American, 0.4% Black or African American, 0.4% Asian, 0.6% of some other race and 1.3% of two or more races. 2.3% were Hispanic or Latino (of any race). 19.8% were of German, 13.5% American, 12.1% English, 11.2% Dutch and 8.1% Irish ancestry.

=== 2000 census ===
As of the 2000 United States census, there were 56,755 people, 21,035 households, and 15,986 families living in the county. The population density was 102 inhabitants per square mile (39/km^{2}). There were 23,876 housing units at an average density of 43 per square mile (17/km^{2}). The racial makeup of the county was 97.39% White, 0.24% African American, 0.46% Native American, 0.27% Asian, 0.01% Pacific Islander, 0.50% from other races, and 1.12% from two or more races. 1.46% of the population were Hispanic or Latino of any race. 21.8% were of German, 13.6% English, 12.5% Dutch, 12.4% American and 9.6% Irish ancestry according to Census 2000. 98.2% spoke only English at home.

There were 21,035 households, out of which 35.20% had children under the age of 18 living with them, 64.10% were married couples living together, 7.70% had a female householder with no husband present, and 24.00% were non-families. 19.50% of all households were made up of individuals, and 7.70% had someone living alone who was 65 years of age or older. The average household size was 2.68 and the average family size was 3.06.

The county population contained 27.20% under the age of 18, 7.50% from 18 to 24, 29.00% from 25 to 44, 24.60% from 45 to 64, and 11.80% who were 65 years of age or older. The median age was 37 years. For every 100 females, there were 99.70 males. For every 100 females age 18 and over, there were 98.80 males.

The median income for a household in the county was $46,820, and the median income for a family was $51,794. Males had a median income of $38,991 versus $26,387 for females. The per capita income for the county was $20,636. About 3.90% of families and 5.50% of the population were below the poverty line, including 5.90% of those under age 18 and 5.90% of those age 65 or over.

== Government ==
=== Elections ===
Barry County has been strongly Republican from its start. Since 1884, the Republican Party nominee has carried the county vote in 92% of the elections (33 of 36 elections).

United States presidential election results for Barry County, Michigan
Year	Republican		Democratic		Third party(ies)	
Year	No.	%	No.	%	No.	%
1884	2,699	44.71%	2,937	48.65%	401	6.64%
1888	3,212	49.83%	2,676	41.51%	558	8.66%
1892	2,854	49.20%	1,800	31.03%	1,147	19.77%
1896	3,294	49.63%	3,157	47.57%	186	2.80%
1900	3,294	51.44%	2,895	45.21%	214	3.34%
1904	3,675	63.08%	1,817	31.19%	334	5.73%
1908	3,247	57.46%	2,126	37.62%	278	4.92%
1912	1,585	28.84%	1,800	32.75%	2,111	38.41%
1916	3,157	53.82%	2,491	42.47%	218	3.72%
1920	5,154	70.69%	1,874	25.70%	263	3.61%
1924	5,656	70.72%	2,046	25.58%	296	3.70%
1928	6,044	79.94%	1,459	19.30%	58	0.77%
1932	4,556	49.21%	4,416	47.70%	286	3.09%
1936	4,950	53.48%	3,880	41.92%	425	4.59%
1940	6,872	68.55%	3,091	30.83%	62	0.62%
1944	7,057	69.17%	3,010	29.50%	136	1.33%
1948	5,677	64.75%	2,726	31.09%	365	4.16%
1952	8,933	72.70%	3,230	26.29%	124	1.01%
1956	9,359	70.22%	3,907	29.31%	63	0.47%
1960	9,298	67.54%	4,406	32.00%	63	0.46%
1964	5,509	40.36%	8,102	59.36%	39	0.29%
1968	8,492	55.14%	5,206	33.81%	1,702	11.05%
1972	10,393	64.02%	5,484	33.78%	356	2.19%
1976	11,178	60.79%	6,967	37.89%	243	1.32%
1980	12,006	58.13%	6,857	33.20%	1,791	8.67%
1984	14,245	70.29%	5,898	29.10%	122	0.60%
1988	12,546	60.66%	7,983	38.60%	152	0.73%
1992	9,489	38.57%	8,652	35.17%	6,458	26.25%
1996	11,139	48.18%	9,467	40.95%	2,514	10.87%
2000	15,716	59.88%	9,769	37.22%	759	2.89%
2004	18,638	61.57%	11,312	37.37%	322	1.06%
2008	16,431	53.65%	13,449	43.91%	749	2.45%
2012	16,655	58.20%	11,491	40.15%	471	1.65%
2016	19,202	62.92%	9,114	29.87%	2,201	7.21%
2020	23,471	65.27%	11,797	32.80%	693	1.93%
2024	25,650	66.41%	12,391	32.08%	584	1.51%

United States Senate election results for Barry County, Michigan1
Year	Republican		Democratic		Third party(ies)	
Year	No.	%	No.	%	No.	%
2024	24,678	64.72%	12,311	32.29%	1,143	3.00%

Michigan Gubernatorial election results for Barry County
Year	Republican		Democratic		Third party(ies)	
Year	No.	%	No.	%	No.	%
2022	18,547	60.42%	11,552	37.63%	598	1.95%

The county government operates the jail, maintains rural roads, operates the major local courts, records deeds, mortgages, and vital records, administers public health regulations, and participates with the state in the provision of social services. The county board of commissioners controls the budget, and has limited authority to make laws or ordinances. In Michigan, most local government functions—police and fire, building and zoning, tax assessment, street maintenance, etc.—are the responsibility of individual cities and townships.

=== Elected officials ===
- Prosecuting Attorney: Julie Nakfoor-Pratt
- Sheriff: Dar Leaf
- County Clerk: Sarah M. VanDenburg
- County Treasurer: Kelli Shumway
- Register of Deeds: Emily Reed
- Drain Commissioner: James Dull
- County Board of Commissioners: 8 Members (8 Republicans, 0 Democrats)

(information as of January 2025)

In an October 2020 interview with Fox 17 News, Sheriff Dar Leaf stated that the individuals charged in a plot to kidnap Governor Gretchen Whitmer may have been attempting to effectuate a lawful arrest on Whitmer as opposed to a kidnapping. The Sheriff had shared a stage with one of those charged at a protest of the Governor's stay-at-home order in May.

== Education ==
Public schools in Barry County:

- Hastings – 7 public schools, 2 private schools, 1 community college (extension of Kellogg Community College) (see Hastings, Michigan)
- Delton – 3 public schools, 3 private schools (see Delton, Michigan)
- Middleville – 5 public schools (see Middleville, Michigan)

== Sports ==
Barry County is the host of the annual Barry-Roubaix cycling race.

== Arts and culture ==
The annual Barry County Artists Exhibition highlights local art each summer.

== Communities ==
=== City ===
- Hastings (county seat)

=== Villages ===
- Freeport
- Middleville
- Nashville
- Woodland

=== Census-designated places ===
- Delton
- Dowling
- Hickory Corners

=== Unincorporated communities ===
- Assyria
- Banfield
- Cedar Creek
- Cloverdale
- Coats Grove
- Irving
- Lacey
- Maple Grove
- Orangeville
- Prairieville
- Quimby
- Schultz

=== Townships ===
- Assyria Township
- Baltimore Township
- Barry Township
- Carlton Township
- Castleton Township
- Hastings Charter Township
- Hope Township
- Irving Township
- Johnstown Township
- Maple Grove Township
- Orangeville Township
- Prairieville Township
- Rutland Charter Township
- Thornapple Township
- Woodland Township
- Yankee Springs Township

== See also ==
- List of Michigan State Historic Sites in Barry County
- National Register of Historic Places listings in Barry County, Michigan
- List of counties in Michigan
