= Johnstown Township, Michigan =

- Township
- Location within the state of Michigan
- Coordinates: 42°27′37″N 85°15′18″W
- Country: United States
- State: Michigan
- County: Barry

Area
  - Total: 36.5 sq mi (94.5 km^{2})
  - Land: 34.9 sq mi (90.5 km^{2})
  - Water: 1.5 sq mi (4.0 km^{2})
- Elevation: 920 ft (280 m)

Population (2020)
  - Total: 2,841
  - Density: 81.3/sq mi (31.4/km^{2})
- Time zone: UTC-5 (Eastern (EST))
  - Summer (DST): UTC-4 (EDT)
- FIPS code: 26-41860
- GNIS feature ID: 1626542
- Website: https://johnstowntwpmi.gov/

Johnstown Township is a civil township of Barry County in the U.S. state of Michigan. The population was 2,841 at the 2020 census. Johnstown Township was originally established in 1838 but was much larger. It gained its current boundaries in 1849.

== Geography ==
According to the United States Census Bureau, the township has a total area of 36.5 square miles (94.5 km^{2}), of which 34.9 square miles (90.5 km^{2}) is land and 1.5 square miles (4.0 km^{2}), or 4.26%, is water. The unincorporated community of Banfield is in the township.

== Demographics ==
As of the census of 2000, there were 3,067 people, 1,206 households, and 915 families residing in the township. The population density was 87.0 inhabitants per square mile (33.6/km^{2}). There were 1,367 housing units at an average density of 38.8 per square mile (15.0/km^{2}). The racial makeup of the township was 98.08% White, 0.16% African American, 0.42% Native American, 0.03% Asian, 0.33% from other races, and 0.98% from two or more races. Hispanic or Latino of any race were 0.75% of the population.

There were 1,206 households, out of which 29.6% had children under the age of 18 living with them, 66.2% were married couples living together, 5.8% had a female householder with no husband present, and 24.1% were non-families. 19.7% of all households were made up of individuals, and 5.4% had someone living alone who was 65 years of age or older. The average household size was 2.54 and the average family size was 2.90.

In the township the population was spread out, with 23.5% under the age of 18, 6.9% from 18 to 24, 26.3% from 25 to 44, 31.2% from 45 to 64, and 12.0% who were 65 years of age or older. The median age was 41 years. For every 100 females, there were 103.0 males. For every 100 females age 18 and over, there were 102.3 males.

The median income for a household in the township was $50,216, and the median income for a family was $55,125. Males had a median income of $41,534 versus $35,369 for females. The per capita income for the township was $22,153. About 2.3% of families and 4.5% of the population were below the poverty line, including 3.7% of those under age 18 and 2.2% of those age 65 or over.
