= Grand Rapids metropolitan area =

Metropolitan area in Michigan, United States

Grand Rapids metropolitan area Grand Rapids–Wyoming--Kentwood MSA Grand Rapids–Wyoming CSA
- Metropolitan area
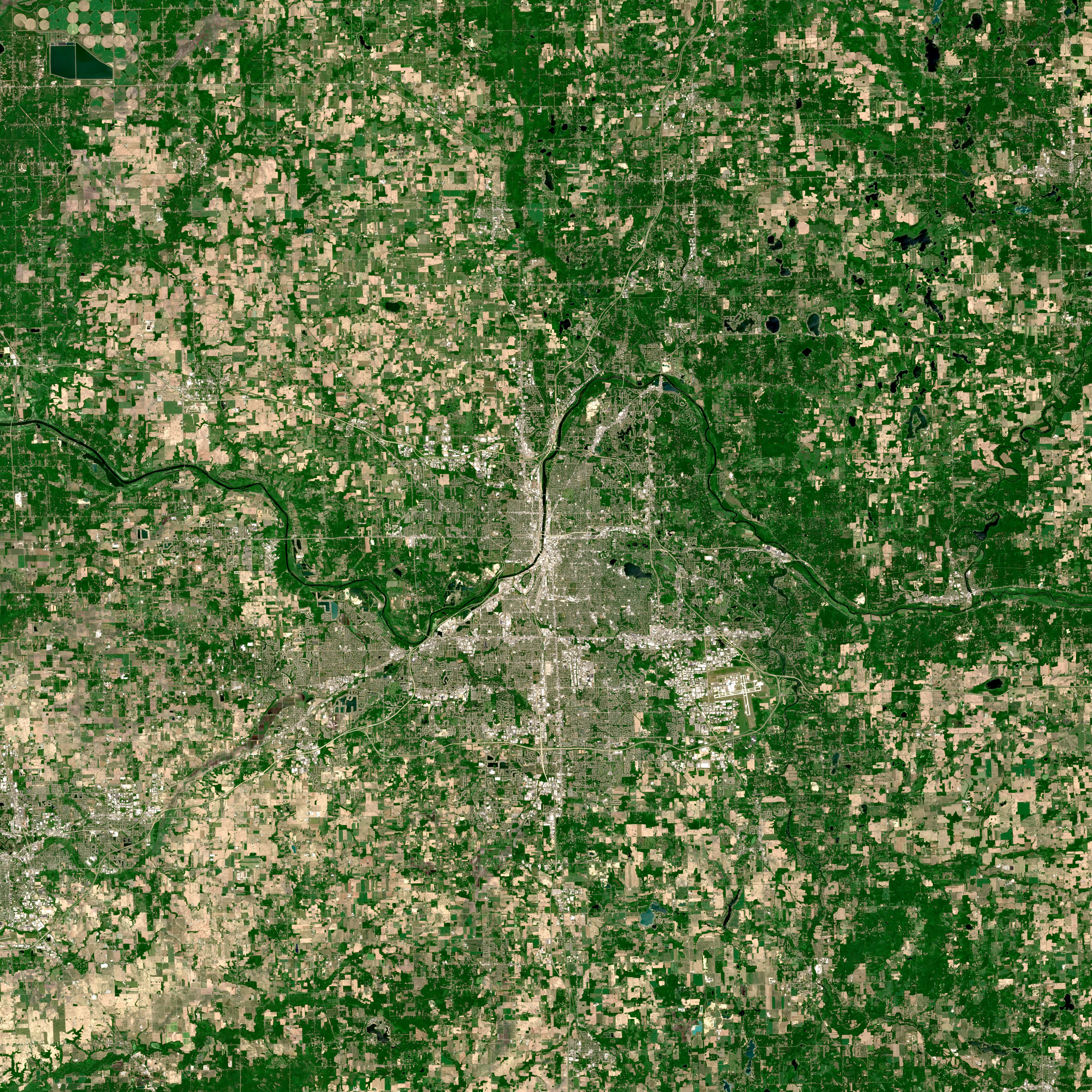
- Satellite image of the city of Grand Rapids and its surrounding area.

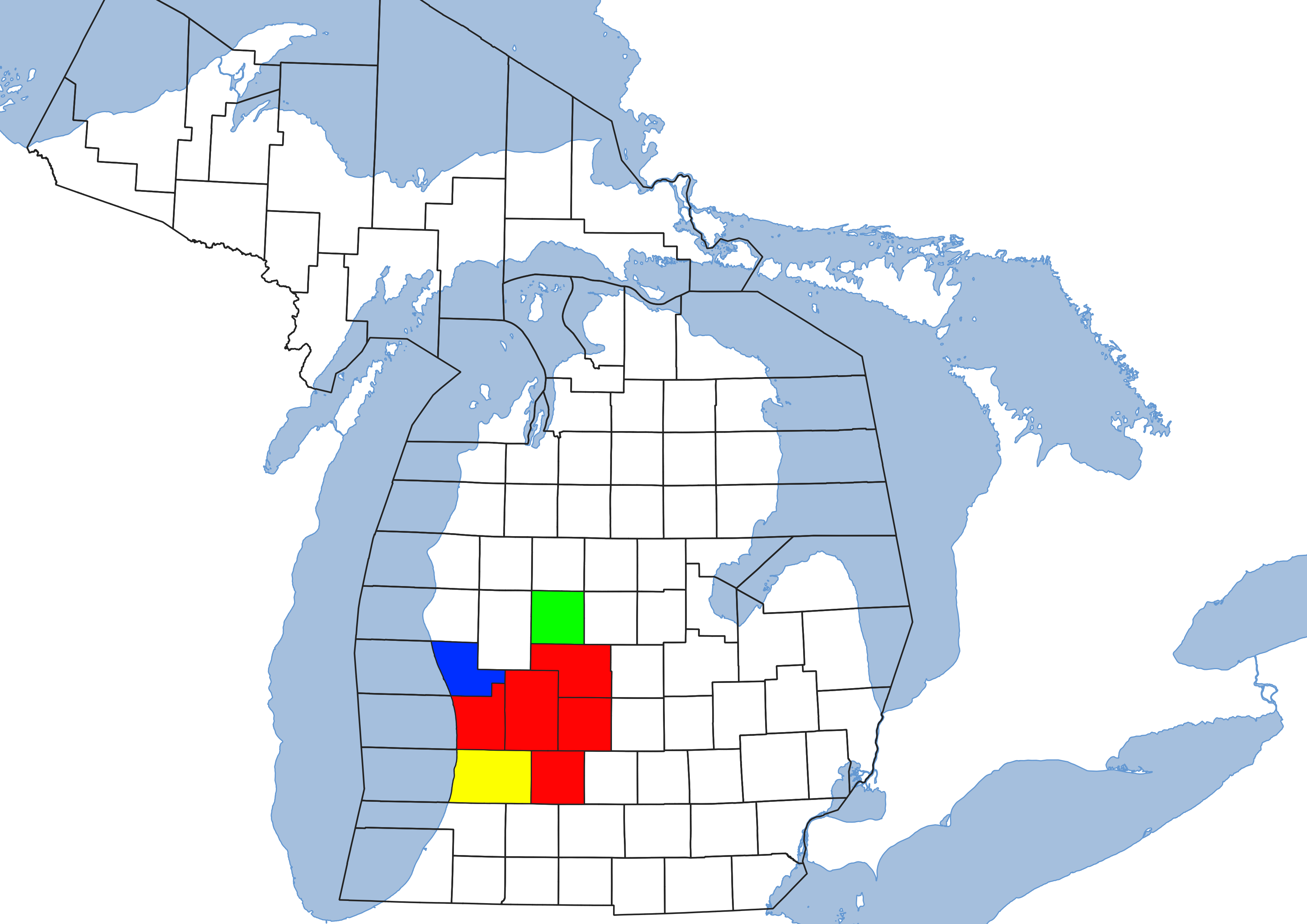
- Grand Rapids-Kentwood-Muskegon CSA and its components: Grand Rapids MSA Muskegon MSA Holland μSA Big Rapids μSA
- Coordinates: 42.9703°N 85.6691°W
- Country: United States
- State: Michigan
- Largest city: Grand Rapids
- Counties: List: In MSA: Ionia; Ottawa; Kent; Montcalm; Additional in CSA: Muskegon; Allegan; Mecosta

Area
  - Total: 4,381.2 sq mi (11,347 km^{2})
  - Land: 3,242.2 sq mi (8,397 km^{2})
  - Water: 1,139 sq mi (2,950 km^{2})
  - CSA: 8,245.8 sq mi (21,357 km^{2})

Population (2020)
  - Total: 1,150,015
  - Density: 354.70/sq mi (136.95/km^{2})
  - CSA: 1,486,055
  - CSA density: 180.22/sq mi (69.583/km^{2})

GDP
  - MSA: $77.296 billion (2022)
- Time zone: UTC-5 (EST)
  - Summer (DST): UTC-4 (EDT)

The Grand Rapids metropolitan area is a triangular shaped Metro Triplex, in West Michigan, which goes westward from the primary hub city of Grand Rapids, Michigan, to the other two metro hubs of Muskegon and Holland. The metropolitan area had an estimated population of 1,159,616 in 2017. The region, noted in particular for its western edge abutting the Lake Michigan shoreline and its beaches, is a popular tourist and vacation destination during the summer. Noted popular metro area beach towns include Grand Haven, Holland, Muskegon, and Saugatuck.

The metropolitan area is home to many attractions. Frederik Meijer Gardens & Sculpture Park is located in the outskirts of Grand Rapids. Michigan's Adventure theme park is just north of Muskegon, the Gun Lake Casino Resort is at the south gateway of the metro area in Wayland, and the Grand Rapids Art Museum and the DeVos Place Convention Center are both in downtown Grand Rapids. The Grand River flows through the metropolitan area and is noted for its fishing, kayaking, and canoeing.

== Definitions ==
The Grand Rapids–Wyoming–Kentwood Metropolitan Statistical Area, as defined by the United States Census Bureau, is an area consisting of five counties in western Michigan, anchored by the cities of Grand Rapids, Wyoming, and Kentwood. The MSA had a population of 1,150,015 at the 2020 census. It comprises five counties which include the central county of Kent, and the outlying counties of Barry, Ionia, Montcalm, and Ottawa.

County	Seat	2025 Estimate	2020 Census	Change	Area	Density
Kent	Grand Rapids	675,232	657,974	+2.62%	847 sq mi (2,190 km^{2})	797/sq mi (308/km^{2})
Ottawa	Grand Haven	308,459	296,200	+4.14%	563 sq mi (1,460 km^{2})	548/sq mi (212/km^{2})
Montcalm	Stanton	69,406	66,614	+4.19%	705 sq mi (1,830 km^{2})	98/sq mi (38/km^{2})
Ionia	Ionia	66,557	66,804	−0.37%	571 sq mi (1,480 km^{2})	117/sq mi (45/km^{2})
Barry	Hastings	63,991	62,423	+2.51%	553 sq mi (1,430 km^{2})	116/sq mi (45/km^{2})
Total		1,183,645	1,150,015	+2.92%	3,239 sq mi (8,390 km^{2})	365/sq mi (141/km^{2})

The Grand Rapids–Wyoming Combined Statistical Area is the 2nd largest CSA in the U.S. state of Michigan (behind Metro Detroit). The CSA had a population of 1,486,055 at the 2020 census. The primary cultural and financial centers of the region are Grand Rapids, Muskegon and Holland. It includes the five counties in the Grand Rapids–Wyoming–Kentwood MSA, the separate metropolitan area of Muskegon–Norton Shores (Muskegon County), and the two micropolitan areas of Holland (Allegan County) and Big Rapids (Mecosta County), for a total of eight counties.

Statistical Area	2025 estimate	2020 Census	Change	Area	Density
Grand Rapids–Wyoming–Kentwood, MI Metropolitan Statistical Area	1,183,645	1,150,015	+2.92%	3,239 sq mi (8,390 km^{2})	365/sq mi (141/km^{2})
Muskegon–Norton Shores, MI Metropolitan Statistical Area	177,901	175,824	+1.18%	499 sq mi (1,290 km^{2})	357/sq mi (138/km^{2})
Holland, MI Micropolitan Statistical Area	123,188	120,502	+2.23%	825 sq mi (2,140 km^{2})	149/sq mi (58/km^{2})
Big Rapids, MI Micropolitan Statistical Area	42,320	39,714	+6.56%	555 sq mi (1,440 km^{2})	76/sq mi (29/km^{2})
Total	1,527,054	1,486,055	+2.76%	5,118 sq mi (13,260 km^{2})	298/sq mi (115/km^{2})

The Grand Rapids metropolitan area is part of the Great Lakes megalopolis containing an estimated 54 million people.

== Communities ==
=== Places with more than 50,000 inhabitants ===
- Georgetown Charter Township
- Grand Rapids (Principal city of MSA and CSA)
- Kentwood (Principal city of MSA and CSA)
- Wyoming (Principal City of MSA and CSA)

=== Places with 20,000 to 50,000 inhabitants ===
- Allendale Charter Township
- Byron Township
- Forest Hills (CDP)
- Gaines Charter Township
- Holland
- Holland Charter Township
- Muskegon (Principal city of CSA)
- Norton Shores
- Plainfield Charter Township
- Walker

=== Places with 10,000 to 20,000 inhabitants ===
- Ada Township
- Algoma Township
- Allendale (CDP)
- Alpine Township
- Big Rapids
- Caledonia Township
- Cannon Township
- Cascade Charter Township
- Comstock Park (CDP)
- Cutlerville (CDP)
- East Grand Rapids
- Egelston Township
- Fruitport Charter Township
- Grand Haven
- Grand Haven Charter Township
- Grand Rapids Charter Township
- Grandville
- Ionia
- Jenison (CDP)
- Muskegon Charter Township
- Park Township
- Northview (CDP)
- Spring Lake Township
- Zeeland Charter Township

=== Places with 5,000 to 10,000 inhabitants ===
- Belding
- Blendon Township
- Boston Township
- Courtland Township
- Dalton Township
- Dorr Township
- Fruitland Township
- Greenville
- Gun Plain Township
- Hudsonville
- Jamestown Charter Township
- Laketon Township
- Laketown Township
- Leighton Township
- Lowell Charter Township
- Muskegon Heights
- Oakfield Township
- Olive Township
- Otsego Township
- Port Sheldon Township
- Robinson Township
- Rockford
- Salem Township
- Solon Township
- Sparta Township
- Tallmadge Charter Township
- Thornapple Township
- Tyrone Township
- Zeeland

=== Places with 2,500 to 5,000 inhabitants ===
- Allegan
- Allegan Township
- Ashland Township
- Beechwood (CDP)
- Berlin Township
- Big Prairie Township
- Bowne Township
- Brooks Township
- Byron Center (CDP)
- Casco Township
- Casnovia Township
- Cedar Creek Township
- Cedar Springs
- Coopersville
- Crockery Township
- Croton Township
- Danby Township
- Easton Township
- Ensley Township
- Ferrysburg
- Fillmore Township
- Fremont
- Ganges Township
- Garfield Township
- Grant Township
- Grattan Township
- Heath Township
- Holton Township
- Hopkins Township
- Ionia Township
- Lee Township
- Lowell
- Lyons Township
- Manlius Township
- Martin Township
- Middleville
- Nelson Township
- North Muskegon
- Odessa Township
- Orleans Township
- Otsego
- Overisel Township
- Plainwell
- Polkton Charter Township
- Portland
- Portland Township
- Ravenna Township
- Roosevelt Park
- Saugatuck Township
- Sheridan Charter Township
- Sparta
- Spencer Township
- Sullivan Township
- Trowbridge Township
- Vergennes Township
- Wayland
- Wayland Township
- Whitehall
- Wolf Lake (CDP)
- Wright Township

=== Places with fewer than 2,500 inhabitants ===
- Barton Township
- Beaver Township
- Berlin Township
- Blue Lake Township
- Bridgeton Township
- Caledonia
- Campbell Township
- Casnovia
- Cheshire Township
- Chester Township
- Chippewa Lake
- Clarksville
- Clyde Township
- Colfax Township
- Dayton Township
- Denver Township
- Douglass
- Everett Township
- Fennville
- Fruitport
- Goodwell Township
- Grant
- Hesperia
- Home Township
- Hopkins
- Howard City
- Hubbardston (partial)
- Keene Township
- Kent City
- Lakewood Club
- Lakeview
- Lake Odessa
- Lilley Township
- Lincoln Township
- Lyons
- Martin
- Merrill Township
- Mecosta
- Moline
- Monroe Township
- Montague Township
- Monterey Township
- Moorland Township
- Morley
- Muir
- Newaygo
- North Plains Township
- Norwich Township
- Orange Township
- Otisco Township
- Pewamo
- Pierson
- Ravenna
- Ronald Township
- Sand Lake
- Spring Lake
- Saranac
- Saugatuck
- Sebewa Township
- Sherman Township
- Stanwood
- Troy Township
- Twin Lake (CDP)
- Valley Township
- Watson Township
- Whitehall Township
- White Cloud
- White River Township
- Wilcox Township

=== Unincorporated places ===
- Ada
- Alaska
- Alto
- Belmont
- Bitely
- Brunswick
- Campau Corner
- Canadian Lakes
- Cannonsburg
- Cascade
- Comstock Park
- Cooks Corners
- Dutton
- Eastmanville
- Marne
- Orleans
- Palo
- Pullman
- Riverview
- Smyrna
- Wabaningo
- Woodland Park

== Demographics ==
Historical population
Census	Pop.	Note	%±
1900	236,464		—
1910	270,065		14.2%
1920	294,229		8.9%
1930	357,933		21.7%
1940	370,289		3.5%
1950	431,214		16.5%
1960	540,833		25.4%
1970	624,733		15.5%
1980	701,050		12.2%
1990	798,482		13.9%
2000	935,393		17.1%
2010	993,670		6.2%
2020	1,087,592		9.5%
U.S. Decennial Census

=== 2010 Census ===
As of the census of 2010, there were 774,160 people, 290,340 households, and 197,867 families residing within the MSA. The racial makeup of the MSA was 83.1% White, 8.1% African American, 0.5% Native American, 1.9% Asian, 0.03% Pacific Islander, 3.8% from other races, and 2.7% from two or more races. Hispanic or Latino of any race were 8.4% of the population.

=== 2000 Census ===
As of the census of 2000, there were 740,482 people, 272,130 households, and 188,192 families residing within the MSA. The racial makeup of the MSA was 85.71% White, 7.40% African American, 0.53% Native American, 1.51% Asian, 0.05% Pacific Islander, 2.82% from other races, and 1.99% from two or more races. Hispanic or Latino of any race were 6.02% of the population.

The median income for a household in the MSA was $43,251, and the median income for a family was $49,715. Males had a median income of $37,853 versus $25,483 for females. The per capita income for the MSA was $19,173.

== Education ==
- Aquinas College
- Calvin College
- Cornerstone University
- Davenport University
- Grace Christian University
- Grand Rapids Community College
- Grand Valley State University
- Hope College
- Kuyper College
- Kendall College of Art and Design
- Muskegon Community College
- Thomas M. Cooley Law School
- Western Theological Seminary

The area also has campuses for Baker College, Ferris State University, Western Michigan University, and University of Phoenix, and the Michigan State University College of Human Medicine.

== Economy ==
=== Companies in the Grand Rapids metropolitan area ===
- Alticor (formerly Amway), Ada
- American Seating, Grand Rapids
- Baker Books, Grand Rapids
- Bissell, Grand Rapids
- Eerdmans, Grand Rapids
- Family Christian Stores, Grand Rapids
- Farmers Insurance Group, Grand Rapids
- GE Aviation, Cascade
- Gentex, Zeeland
- Gerber Products Company, Fremont
- Goodrich Quality Theaters, Grand Rapids
- Gordon Food Service, Wyoming
- Haworth, Holland
- Herman Miller, Zeeland
- Howard Miller, Zeeland
- Loeks Theatres, Wyoming
- Meijer, Walker
- Mercantile Bank of Michigan, Grand Rapids
- Old Orchard Brands, Sparta
- Perrigo, Allegan
- Plascore Incorporated, Zeeland
- SpartanNash, Byron Township
- Steelcase, Grand Rapids
- Sun Chemical, Muskegon
- Universal Forest Products, Grand Rapids
- Wolverine World Wide, Rockford
- X-Rite, Kentwood
- Zondervan Publishing, Cascade

== Culture and tourism ==
- Centerpointe Mall
- The Lakes Mall
- Rivertown Crossings Mall
- Tanger Outlet Mall
- Woodland Mall
- Frederik Meijer Gardens & Sculpture Park
- Grand Rapids Public Museum
- Grand Haven Musical Fountain

== See also ==
- Michigan census statistical areas
