= Michigan's 80th House of Representatives district =

American legislative district

Michigan's 80th State House of Representatives district
Representative
Phil Skaggs; D–East Grand Rapids
- Demographics: 67.1% White; 13.3% Black; 7% Hispanic; 7.3% Asian; 0.1% Native American; 0.4% Other; 4.8% Multiracial
- Population (2024): 92,346

Michigan's 80th House of Representatives district (also referred to as Michigan's 80th House district) is a legislative district within the Michigan House of Representatives located in part of Kent County. The district was created in 1965, when the Michigan House of Representatives district naming scheme changed from a county-based system to a numerical one.

== List of representatives ==
Representative	Party	Dates	Residence	Notes
Edward Suski	Democratic	1965–1972	Flint	
Harold Joseph Scott	Democratic	1973–1977	Flint	Resigned when elected to Michigan Senate.
Thomas E. Scott	Democratic	1977–1982	Flint	
Floyd Clack	Democratic	1983–1992	Flint	
James Mick Middaugh	Republican	1993–1998	Paw Paw	
Mary Ann Middaugh	Republican	1999–2004	Paw Paw	
Tonya Schuitmaker	Republican	2005–2010	Lawton	
Aric Nesbitt	Republican	2011–2012	Porter Township	
Bob Genetski	Republican	2013–2014	Saugatuck	
Cindy Gamrat	Republican	2015	Plainwell	Expelled amid scandal.
Mary Whiteford	Republican	2016–2022	South Haven	Lived in Allegan in 2016. Lived in Casco Township from around 2017 to 2019.
Phil Skaggs	Democratic	2023–present	East Grand Rapids	
Lily Cheng-Schulting	Democratic	(Note: Member-elect.)	Grand Rapids	

== Recent elections ==
=== 2020s ===
2026 Michigan House of Representatives election
Party	Candidate	Votes	%
Democratic	Lily Cheng-Schulting	28,829	63.13
Republican	Doug Lee	16,838	36.87
Total votes		45,667	100
Democratic hold			

2018 Michigan House of Representatives election
Party	Candidate	Votes	%
Republican	Mary Whiteford	25,000	63.65
Democratic	Mark Ludwig	14,275	36.35
Total votes		39,275	100
Republican hold			

2016 Michigan House of Representatives election
Party	Candidate	Votes	%
Republican	Mary Whiteford	29,721	67.41%
Democratic	John Andrysiak	12,376	28.07%
Constitution	Arnie Davidsons	1,990	4.51%
Total votes		44,087	100.00%
Republican hold			

2016 Michigan House of Representatives special election
Party	Candidate	Votes	%
Republican	Mary Whiteford	14,860	64.0
Democratic	David Gernant	6,945	29.9
Libertarian	Arnie Davidsons	1,424	6.1
Total votes		23,229	
Republican hold			

2014 Michigan House of Representatives election
Party	Candidate	Votes	%
Republican	Cindy Gamrat	17,630	62.78
Democratic	Geoff Parker	9,451	33.65
Libertarian	Arnis Davidsons	1,003	3.57
Total votes		28,084	100.0
Republican hold			

2012 Michigan House of Representatives election
Party	Candidate	Votes	%
Republican	Bob Genetski	25,440	62.22
Democratic	Stuart Peet	15,444	37.78
Total votes		40,884	100.0
Republican hold			

2010 Michigan House of Representatives election
Party	Candidate	Votes	%
Republican	Aric Nesbitt	15,492	64.23
Democratic	Thomas Erdmann	7,850	32.55
Independent	Cheryl Evick	778	3.23
Total votes		24,120	100.0
Republican hold			

2008 Michigan House of Representatives election
Party	Candidate	Votes	%
Republican	Tonya Schuitmaker	23,428	61.07
Democratic	Jessie Olson	14,935	38.93
Total votes		38,363	100.0
Republican hold			

== Historical district boundaries ==
Map	Description	Apportionment Plan	Notes
	Genesee County (part): Flint (part); Genesee Township	1964 Apportionment Plan	
	Genesee County (part): Flint (part); Genesee Township (part)	1972 Apportionment Plan	
	Genesee County (part): Flint (part); Genesee Township (part)	1982 Apportionment Plan	
	Cass County (part): Dowagiac; LaGrange Township; Pokagon Township; Silver Creek Township; Volinia Township; Wayne Township; Van Buren County	1992 Apportionment Plan	
	Allegan County (part): Otsego; Otsego Township; Watson Township; Van Buren County	2001 Apportionment Plan	
	Allegan County (part): Allegan; Allegan Township; Casco Township; Cheshire Township; Clyde Township; Village of Douglas; Fennville; Fillmore Township; Ganges Township; Gun Plain Township; Heath Township; Holland (part); Hopkins Township; Laketown Township; Lee Township; Manlius Township; Martin Township; Monterey Township; Otsego; Otsego Township; Overisel Township; Plainwell; Salem Township; Saugatuck; Saugatuck Township; South Haven (part); Trowbridge Township; Valley Township; Watson Township	2011 Apportionment Plan	
