= Michigan's 88th House of Representatives district =

American legislative district

Michigan's 88th State House of Representatives district
Representative
Greg VanWoerkom; R–Norton Shores
- Demographics: 88.1% White; 1.8% Black; 4% Hispanic; 1.8% Asian; 0.2% Native American; 0.3% Other; 3.9% Multiracial
- Population (2024): 92,847

Michigan's 88th House of Representatives district (also referred to as Michigan's 88th House district) is a legislative district within the Michigan House of Representatives located in parts of Muskegon and Ottawa counties. The district was created in 1965, when the Michigan House of Representatives district naming scheme changed from a county-based system to a numerical one.

== List of representatives ==
Representative	Party	Dates	Residence	Notes
Lester J. Allen	Republican	1965–1968	Ithaca	
Richard J. Allen	Republican	1969–1972	Ithaca	
Stanley M. Powell	Republican	1973–1978	Ionia	
Alan Cropsey	Republican	1979–1982	DeWitt	
Robert G. Bender	Republican	1983–1992	Middleville	
Paul Hillegonds	Republican	1993–1996	Holland	
Patricia L. Birkholz	Republican	1997–2002	Saugatuck	
Fulton Sheen	Republican	2003–2008	Plainwell	
Robert Genetski	Republican	2009–2012	Saugatuck	
Roger Victory	Republican	2013–2018	Hudsonville	
Luke Meerman	Republican	2019–2022	Coopersville	
Greg VanWoerkom	Republican	2023–present	Norton Shores	

== Recent elections ==
=== 2020s ===
2026 Michigan House of Representatives election
Party	Candidate	Votes	%
Republican	Greg VanWoerkom (incumbent)	27,672	53.94
Democratic	Kiel Reid	23,626	46.06
Total votes		51,298	100
Republican hold			

2024 Michigan House of Representatives election
Party	Candidate	Votes	%
Republican	Greg VanWoerkom	33,591	57.0
Democratic	Tim Meyer	25,367	43.0
Total votes		58,958	100
Republican hold			

2022 Michigan House of Representatives election
Party	Candidate	Votes	%
Republican	Greg VanWoerkom	27,448	56.3
Democratic	Christine Baker	20,416	41.9
Libertarian	Marv Bolthouse	886	1.8
Total votes		48,750	100
Republican hold			

2020 Michigan House of Representatives election
Party	Candidate	Votes	%
Republican	Luke Meerman	38,841	72.2
Democratic	Franklin Cornielle	14,946	27.8
Total votes		53,787	100
Republican hold			

2018 Michigan House of Representatives election
Party	Candidate	Votes	%
Republican	Luke Meerman	28,593	71.0
Democratic	Heidi A. Zuniga	11,667	29.0
Total votes		40,260	100
Republican hold			

2016 Michigan House of Representatives election
Party	Candidate	Votes	%
Republican	Roger Victory	34,356	75.1
Democratic	Kim Nagy	11,410	24.9
Total votes		45,766	100
Republican hold			

2014 Michigan House of Representatives election
Party	Candidate	Votes	%
Republican	Roger Victory	22,788	79.8
Democratic	Janice Gwasdacus	5,761	20.2
Total votes		28,549	100
Republican hold			

2012 Michigan House of Representatives election
Party	Candidate	Votes	%
Republican	Roger Victory	32,053	86.9
Libertarian	Michael Perry	4,843	13.1
Total votes		36,896	100
Republican hold			

2010 Michigan House of Representatives election
Party	Candidate	Votes	%
Republican	Bob Genetski	23,518	73.7
Democratic	Randy Thompson	8,389	26.3
Total votes		31,907	100
Republican hold			

2008 Michigan House of Representatives election
Party	Candidate	Votes	%
Republican	Bob Genetski	29,064	61.6
Democratic	Tom Clark	18,119	38.4
Total votes		47,183	100
Republican hold			

== Historical district boundaries ==
Map	Description	Apportionment Plan	Notes
	Clinton County (part): Bengal Township; Dallas Township; Duplain Township; Eagle Township; Essex Township; Greenbush Township; Lebanon Township; Riley Township; Watertown Township; Westphalia Township; Eaton County (part): Grand Ledge; Oneida Township; Gratiot County Midland County (part): Coleman; Edenville Township; Geneva Township; Greendale Township; Jasper Township; Lee Township; Porter Township; Warren Township	1964 Apportionment Plan	
	Clinton County (part): Excluding; Bath Township (part); Eagle Township; Victor Township; Watertown Township; Gratiot County (part): Fulton Township; New Haven Township; Newark Township; North Shade Township; Ionia County (part): Excluding; Campbell Township (part); Danby Township; Odessa Township; Orange Township; Portland Township; Sebewa Township; Montcalm County (part): Fairplain Township; Carson City; Shiawassee County (part): Fairfield Township	1972 Apportionment Plan	
	Barry County (part): Assyria Township; Baltimore Township; Barry Township; Carlton Township; Castleton Township; Hastings; Hastings Township; Hope Township; Irving Township; Johnstown Township; Maple Grove Township; Orangeville Township; Prairieville Township; Rutland Township; Woodland Township	1982 Apportionment Plan	
	Allegan County	1992 Apportionment Plan	
	Allegan County (part): Allegan; Allegan Township; Casco Township; Cheshire Township; Clyde Township; Dorr Township; Fennville; Fillmore Township; Ganges Township; Gunplain Township; Heath Township; Holland (part); Hopkins Township; Laketown Township; Lee Township; Leighton Township; Manlius Township; Martin Township; Monterey Township; Overisel Township; Plainwell; Salem Township; Saugatuck; Saugatuck Township; South Haven (part); Trowbridge Township; Valley Township; Wayland; Wayland Township	2001 Apportionment Plan	
	Ottawa County (part): Allendale Township; Chester Township; Coopersville; Georgetown Township; Polkton Township; Tallmadge Township; Wright Township	2011 Apportionment Plan	
