= Allegan Public Schools =

School district in Michigan

Address
- 550 Fifth Street Allegan, Allegan County, Michigan, 49010; United States

District information
- Grades: PreK-12
- Superintendent: James Antoine
- Schools: 8
- Budget: US$46,431,000 (2022–2023 expenditures)
- NCES District ID: 2602220

Students and staff
- Students: 2,046 (2024–2025)
- Teachers: 119.32 FTE (2024–25)
- Staff: 272.44 FTE (2024–2025)
- Student–teacher ratio: 17.15 (2024–25)

Other information
- Website: alleganps.org

Allegan Public Schools is a public school district in Allegan County, Michigan. It serves the city of Allegan and portions of the following townships: Allegan, Cheshire, Lee, Heath, Monterey, Otsego, Valley, and Watson.

== History ==
Allegan High School opened in fall 1957.

== Schools ==
Schools in Allegan Public Schools district
School	Address	Notes
Allegan High School	1560 M-40, Allegan	Grades 9–12
Dawson Elementary	125 Elm St, Allegan	Grades K-5
L.E. White Middle School	3300 W 115th Ave, Allegan	Grades 6–8
North Ward Early Childhood Center	440 River St, Allegan	Grades K-5
Pine Trails Elementary	2950 Center St, Allegan	Grades K-5
West Ward Elementary	630 Vernon St, Allegan	Grades K-5
