= Martin Public Schools =

School district in Michigan

Address
- 1556 Chalmers Martin, Allegan County, Michigan, 49070; United States

District information
- Grades: PreKindergarten–12
- Superintendent: Samantha Ball
- Schools: 2
- Budget: $9,060,000 2022–2023 expenditures
- NCES District ID: 2622980

Students and staff
- Students: 630 (2024–2025)
- Teachers: 35.4 (on an FTE basis) (2024–2025)
- Staff: 73.95 FTE (2024–2025)
- Student–teacher ratio: 17.8 (2024–2025)
- District mascot: Clippers

Other information
- Website: www.martinpublicschools.org

Martin Public Schools is a public school district in West Michigan. In Allegan County, it serves Martin and parts of the townships of Gun Plain, Hopkins, Martin, Otsego, and Watson. In Barry County, it serves parts of Orangeville Township.

== History ==
The current site of Martin’s school building has been in continuous use since 1908. However, the school building constructed that year was destroyed by fire in 1909 after only a brief period of use. The rebuilt school underwent several expansions and demolitions, and currently the oldest section dates to 1965.

The school building underwent a remodeling in 2010, when one of the older wings was torn down. Additions such as a performance gymnasium and a 400-seat auditorium were built in 2017, along with other facility improvements. In January 2026, a ribbon-cutting ceremony was held for the renovated elementary library and middle/high school cafeteria.

=== Solar energy project ===
On August 15, 2018, 622 solar panels on the roof of the school were turned on. Their installation was designed to generate 40 percent of the district's energy needs, or 198,222 kWh per year.

== Schools ==
Schools in the district share sections of an interconnected building in Martin.

Schools in Martin Public Schools district
School	Address	Notes
Martin Middle/High School	1556 Chalmers, Martin	Grades 6–12
Brandon Elementary	1583 University, Martin	Grades PreK-5
