= Zeeland Public Schools =

School district in Michigan

Address
- 183 West Roosevelt Ave. Zeeland, Ottawa, Michigan, 49464; United States

District information
- Grades: Pre-Kindergarten-12
- Superintendent: Scott Korpak (interim)
- Schools: 12
- Budget: $113,955,000 2022-2023 expenditures
- NCES District ID: 2636660

Students and staff
- Students: 5,788 (2024-2025)
- Teachers: 373.63 (on an FTE basis) (2024-2025)
- Staff: 841.53 FTE (2024-2025)
- Student–teacher ratio: 15.49 (2024-2025)

Other information
- Website: www.zps.org

Zeeland Public Schools is a public school district headquartered in Zeeland, Michigan. It serves parts of surrounding townships in Ottawa and Allegan counties. In Ottawa County, it serves the city of Zeeland and parts of Blendon, Holland, Olive, Robinson, and Zeeland townships. It also serves small parts of Fillmore, Overisel, and Salem townships in Allegan County.

== History ==
Zeeland Public Schools was organized in 1850 and instruction was conducted in the Dutch language. A dedicated brick school building was built in 1879. In 1894, when the first class graduated from Zeeland High School, students graduated after completing eleven grades. A dedicated high school building opened in 1909. A new high school opened in February 1925. Another building was added to the high school campus in 1957. It was located at 320 East Main Avenue, and currently houses Cityside Middle School. The 1925 section has since been torn down. Creekside Middle School opened in 1966.

The current Zeeland High School (which became Zeeland East High when West High opened) opened in fall 1996. On the same campus, West High School opened in fall 2002. The designer of both buildings was GMB Architects. The high school mascots were chosen in 2001: the Chix for East High and the Dux for West High. A pool was built at West High School in 2005.

== Schools ==
Schools in the Zeeland Public Schools District
School	Address	Notes
Early Childhood Center	140 W. McKinley, Zeeland	Preschool
Adams Elementary	7447 Adams, Zeeland	Grades K-5
Lincoln Elementary	60. E. Lincoln, Zeeland	Grades K-5
New Groningen Elementary	10542 Chicago Drive, Zeeland	Grades K-5
Quincy Elementary	10155 Quincy, Zeeland	Grades K-5
Roosevelt Elementary	175 W. Roosevelt, Zeeland	Grades K-5
Woodbridge Elementary	9110 Woodbridge St., Zeeland	Grades K-5
ZQuest K-8	175 W. Roosevelt, Zeeland	Project-based curriculum school for grades K-8 housed at Roosevelt Elementary.
Cityside Middle School	320 E Main St., Zeeland	Grades 6-8
Creekside Middle School	179 W. Roosevelt Ave., Zeeland	Grades 6-8
Zeeland East High School	3333 96th Ave., Zeeland	Grades 9-12; opened 1996
Zeeland West High School	3390 100th Ave., Zeeland	Grades 9-12; opened 2002
Venture Academy	183 W. Roosevelt Ave., Zeeland	Alternative high school
