= Lake Allegan =

Lake in Allegan County, Michigan, United States

- Location within the state of Michigan
- Location: Allegan County, Michigan
- Coordinates: 42°33′N 85°56′W
- Primary inflows: Kalamazoo River
- Primary outflows: Lake Michigan
- Basin countries: United States
- Max. length: 6 mi (9.7 km)
- Max. width: 1.5 mi (2.4 km)
- Surface area: 2.5 sq mi (6.5 km^{2})
- Average depth: 15 ft (4.6 m)
- Surface elevation: 600 ft (180 m)
- Islands: Eagle Island
- Settlements: Allegan, MI

Lake Allegan is a man-made lake located in Valley Township just outside the city of Allegan in the U.S. state of Michigan (Allegan County). The water is safe for swimming and boating. The lake has a large surface area of almost 1,600 acres (2.5 mi^{2}, 6.475 km^{2}). Salmon runs occur on the western side of Lake Allegan's Calkins Bridge dam which leads to Lake Michigan via the Kalamazoo River.

Lake Allegan is adjacent to the 50,000-acre Allegan Forest. Geese, ducks, kingfishers, eagles and great blue herons frequent the lake. The Allegan Lake Overlook is one of the best places to view the lake located on Monroe Road, two and one half miles from M-89. There is a DNR access point and a boat launch located at Echo Point on Monroe Road near 42nd Street.

On the west shoreline of Lake Allegan, there still exists the building foundations of a POW camp that housed German POWs during World War II. This camp, which is now part of the Allegan State Game Area, was in use until the end of the war. The prisoners at the camp thought Lake Allegan was Lake Michigan and that they could escape by swimming to Chicago.

Lake Allegan's water levels are constant and predictable due to Calkins Bridge Dam. The Kalamazoo River flows into Lake Allegan to Calkins and then out to Lake Michigan near Saugatuck. Calkins Bridge Dam provides electricity for the area and recreational opportunities. In the spring and fall, when the fish are spawning, the Calkins Bridge Dam is a favorite spot for fishermen. The Calkins Bridge Dam is owned and operated by Consumers Energy Company and is also referred to as Allegan Hydroelectric Plant.

Lake Allegan
