= Cheshire Township =

Cheshire Township may refer to the following places in the United States:

- Cheshire Township, Michigan
- Cheshire Township, Ohio
