= Robert Genetski =

American politician

Member of the Michigan House of Representatives from the 80th district 88th District (2009–2012)
- In office January 1, 2009 – December 31, 2014
- Preceded by: Fulton Sheen
- Succeeded by: Cindy Gamrat

Personal details
- Party: Republican
- Profession: Politician

Robert Genetski is a Republican politician from the U.S. state of Michigan. He is currently the Allegan County Clerk and Register of Deeds. In his capacity has Clerk, Genetski has focused on increasing support services to veterans. He is a former member of the Michigan House of Representatives, representing the 88th District which covers Allegan County, including the cities of Holland, Allegan, Douglas, Fennville, Plainwell, Saugatuck, South Haven, and Wayland. Prior to his first term as a State Representative, Genetski was a school teacher for a decade. He spent time teaching at Orion Alternative School, which caters to at-risk students.

Genetski was stopped and arrested Jan. 20th 2012, for driving under the influence leaving the governor's State of State gala. Genetski refused to take a preliminary breath test and was subsequently arrested. Genetski fought the charges in court, but was found guilty and sentenced.

== Education ==
Genetski earned his B.A. in education from Auburn University in 1991 and his master's degree in education from Grand Valley State University in 2004.

== Views ==
=== Second Amendment ===
Bob Genetski
(@vote4bobg)
tweeted:

Replying to @CNN

That kid @davidhogg111 is just an actor and @CNN needs some new ones.

26 Feb 2018

Following the Stoneman Douglas High School shooting, Genetski tweeted that David Hogg was a paid crisis actor. In a follow-up statement Genetski said he didn't believe Hogg was a trained actor or was paid money by CNN. Genetski wrote in depth to many media outlets, to further explain, sharing his viewpoint that CNN found an individual that met their anti-2nd Amendment narrative.
