= List of jurisdictions subject to the special provisions of the Voting Rights Act of 1965 =

Jurisdictions under Section 5 oversight at the time of the Shelby County v. Holder decision. State or county covered under Section 5 Jurisdiction bailed out under Section 4 within a state covered under Section 5 County with township covered under Section 5

The following jurisdictions in the United States are or have been subject to the special provisions of the Voting Rights Act of 1965. Jurisdictions encompassed by the coverage formula contained in Section 4(b) are called "covered jurisdictions"; covered jurisdictions are subject to preclearance under Section 5. Covered jurisdictions may "bail out" of coverage, while non-covered jurisdictions may be "bailed in" to coverage. The Act's bilingual assistance provision is independent of the other special provisions, and jurisdictions encompassed by this provision are listed separately.

== Coverage formula ==
The coverage formula, contained in Section 4(b) of the Act, determines which states are subject to preclearance. As enacted in 1965, the first element in the formula was whether, on November 1, 1964, the state or a political subdivision of the state maintained a "test or device" restricting the opportunity to register and vote. The Act's definition of a "test or device" included such requirements as the applicant being able to pass a literacy test, establish that he or she had good moral character, or have another registered voter vouch for his or her qualifications. The second element of the formula would be satisfied if the Director of the Census determined that less than 50 percent of persons of voting age were registered to vote on November 1, 1964, or that less than 50 percent of persons of voting age voted in the presidential election of November 1964. In 1970, Congress recognized the continuing need for the special provisions of the Act, which were due to expire that year, and renewed them for another five years. It added a second prong to the coverage formula, identical to the original formula except that it referenced November 1968 as the relevant date for the maintenance of a test or device and the levels of voter registration and electoral participation. In 1975, the Act's special provisions were extended for another seven years, and were broadened to address voting discrimination against members of "language minority groups," which were defined as persons who are American Indian, Asian American, Alaskan Natives or of Spanish heritage." As before, Congress expanded the coverage formula, based on the presence of tests or devices and levels of voter registration and participation as of November 1972. In addition, the 1965 definition of "test or device" was expanded to include the practice of providing any election information, including ballots, only in English in states or political subdivisions where members of a single language minority constituted more than five percent of the citizens of voting age. In 1982, the coverage formula was extended again, this time for 25 years, but no changes were made to it. In 2006, the coverage formula was again extended for 25 years. In Shelby County v. Holder (2013), the Supreme Court of the United States struck down the coverage formula as unconstitutional, meaning that no jurisdiction is currently subject to preclearance under the coverage formula.

== Jurisdictions encompassed by coverage formula ==
All counties and municipalities within a covered state are covered unless they have bailed out; counties and municipalities covered by virtue of being within a covered state are not included in this list. The following jurisdictions were encompassed by the coverage formula before the Supreme Court announced its decision.

=== 1965 ===
The following jurisdictions were brought into coverage under the original coverage formula contained within the unrevised Voting Rights Act of 1965:

- States:
  - Alabama
  - Georgia
  - Louisiana
  - Mississippi
  - South Carolina
  - Virginia
- Counties:
  - North Carolina:
    - Anson County, North Carolina
    - Beaufort County, North Carolina
    - Bertie County, North Carolina
    - Bladen County, North Carolina
    - Camden County, North Carolina
    - Caswell County, North Carolina
    - Chowan County, North Carolina
    - Cleveland County, North Carolina
    - Craven County, North Carolina
    - Cumberland County, North Carolina
    - Edgecombe County, North Carolina
    - Franklin County, North Carolina
    - Gaston County, North Carolina
    - Gates County, North Carolina
    - Granville County, North Carolina
    - Greene County, North Carolina
    - Guilford County, North Carolina
    - Halifax County, North Carolina
    - Harnett County, North Carolina
    - Hertford County, North Carolina
    - Hoke County, North Carolina
    - Lee County, North Carolina
    - Lenoir County, North Carolina
    - Martin County, North Carolina
    - Nash County, North Carolina
    - Northampton County, North Carolina
    - Onslow County, North Carolina
    - Pasquotank County, North Carolina
    - Perquimans County, North Carolina
    - Person County, North Carolina
    - Pitt County, North Carolina
    - Robeson County, North Carolina
    - Rockingham County, North Carolina
    - Scotland County, North Carolina
    - Union County, North Carolina
    - Vance County, North Carolina
    - Wake County, North Carolina
    - Washington County, North Carolina
    - Wayne County, North Carolina
    - Wilson County, North Carolina

=== 1970 ===
The following additional jurisdictions became subject to preclearance after the coverage formula was amended in 1970:

- Counties:
  - California:
    - Monterey County, California
    - Yuba County, California
  - New York:
    - Bronx County, New York
    - Kings County, New York
    - New York County
- Municipalities:
  - New Hampshire:
    - Rindge, New Hampshire
    - Millsfield Township, New Hampshire
    - Pinkhams Grant, New Hampshire
    - Stewartstown, New Hampshire
    - Stratford, New Hampshire
    - Benton, New Hampshire
    - Antrim, New Hampshire
    - Boscawen, New Hampshire
    - Newington, New Hampshire
    - Unity, New Hampshire

=== 1975 ===
The following additional jurisdictions became subject to preclearance after the coverage formula was amended in 1975:

- States:
  - Alaska
  - Arizona
  - Texas
- Counties:
  - California:
    - Kings County, California
    - Merced County, California
    - Yuba County, California
  - Florida:
    - Collier County, Florida
    - Hardee County, Florida
    - Hendry County, Florida
    - Hillsborough County, Florida
    - Monroe County, Florida
  - New York:
    - Bronx County, New York
    - Kings County, New York
  - North Carolina:
    - Jackson County, North Carolina
  - South Dakota:
    - Shannon County, South Dakota
    - Todd County, South Dakota
- Municipalities:
  - Michigan:
    - Clyde Township, Michigan
    - Buena Vista Township, Michigan

== Jurisdictions bailed out of coverage ==
Covered jurisdictions may have their coverage terminated by succeeding in a "bail out" action in court. Effective August 5, 1984, the bail out provision was liberalized, allowing more jurisdictions to bail out of coverage. The following jurisdictions have bailed out of coverage:

=== Before August 1984 ===
- Wake County, North Carolina
- Curry, McKinley, and Otero Counties, New Mexico
- Towns of Cadwell, Limestone, Ludlow, Nashville, Reed, Woodland, Connor, New Gloucester, Sullivan, Winter Harbor, Chelsea, Sommerville, Carroll, Charleston, Webster, Waldo, Beddington, and Cutler, Maine
- Choctaw and McCurtain Counties, Oklahoma
- Campbell County, Wyoming
- Towns of Amherst, Ayer, Belchertown, Bourne, Harvard, Sandwich, Shirley, Sunderland, and Wrentham, Massachusetts
- Towns of Groton, Mansfield, and Southbury, Connecticut
- El Paso County, Colorado
- Honolulu County, Hawaii
- Elmore County, Idaho

=== After August 1984 ===
- City of Fairfax, Virginia (including City of Fairfax School Board)
- Frederick County, Virginia (including Frederick County School Board; Towns of Middletown and Stephens City; and Frederick County Shawneeland Sanitary District)
- Shenandoah County, Virginia (including Shenandoah County School Board; Towns of Edinburg, Mount Jackson, New Market, Strasburg, Toms Brook, and Woodstock; Stoney Creek Sanitary District; and Toms Brook-Maurertown Sanitary District)
- Roanoke County, Virginia (including Roanoke County School Board and Town of Vinton)
- City of Winchester, Virginia
- City of Harrisonburg, Virginia (including Harrisonburg City School Board)
- Rockingham County, Virginia (including Rockingham County School Board and Towns of Bridgewater, Broadway, Dayton, Elkton, Grottoes, Mt. Crawford, and Timberville)
- Warren County, Virginia (including Warren County School Board and Town of Front Royal)
- Greene County, Virginia (including Greene County School Board and Town of Standardsville)
- Pulaski County, Virginia (including Pulaski County School Board and Towns of Pulaski and Dublin)
- Augusta County, Virginia (including Augusta County School Board and Town of Craigsville)
- City of Salem, Virginia
- Botetourt County, Virginia (including Botetourt County School Board and Towns of Buchanan, Fincastle, and Troutville)
- Essex County, Virginia (including Essex County School Board and Town of Tappahannock)
- Middlesex County, Virginia (including Middlesex County School Board and Town of Urbanna)
- Amherst County, Virginia (including Town of Amherst)
- Page County, Virginia (including Page County School Board and Towns of Luray, Stanley, and Shenandoah)
- Washington County, Virginia (including Washington County School Board and Towns of Abington, Damascus, and Glade Spring)
- Northwest Austin Municipal Utility District Number One, Texas
- City of Kings Mountain, North Carolina
- City of Sandy Springs, Georgia
- Jefferson County Drainage District Number Seven, Texas
- Alta Irrigation District, California
- City of Manassas Park, Virginia
- Rappahannock County, Virginia (including Rappahannock County School Board and Town of Washington)
- Bedford County, Virginia (including Bedford County School Board)
- City of Bedford, Virginia
- Culpeper County, Virginia (including Culpeper County School Board and Town of Culpeper)
- James City County, Virginia (including Williamsburg-James City County School Board)
- City of Williamsburg, Virginia
- King George County, Virginia (including King George County School District)
- Prince William County, Virginia (including Prince William County School District and Towns of Dumfries, Haymarket, Occoquan, and Quantico)
- City of Pinson, Alabama
- Wythe County, Virginia (including Wythe County School Board and Towns of Rural Retreat and Wytheville)
- Grayson County, Virginia (including Grayson County School Board and Towns of Fries, Independence, and Troutdale)
- Merced County, California (including approximately 84 subjurisdictions)
- Craig County, Virginia (including Craig County School District and Town of New Castle)
- Carroll County, Virginia (including Carroll County School District and Town of Hillsville)

== Jurisdictions bailed into coverage ==
Courts may "bail in" non-covered jurisdictions and require them to submit some or all of their voting changes for preclearance. The preclearance requirements for these "bailed in" jurisdictions were unaffected by the Supreme Court's ruling in Shelby County v. Holder. The following jurisdictions have been bailed into coverage under Section 3(c) of the Voting Rights Act:

- Thurston County, Nebraska
- Escambia County, Florida
- Alexander County, Illinois
- Gadsden County School District, Florida
- State of New Mexico
- McKinley County, New Mexico
- Sandoval County, New Mexico
- City of Chattanooga, Tennessee
- Montezuma-Cortez School District RE-1, Colorado
- State of Arkansas
- Los Angeles County, California
- Cibola County, New Mexico
- Socorro County, New Mexico
- Alameda County, California
- Bernalillo County, New Mexico
- Buffalo County, South Dakota
- Charles Mix County, South Dakota
- Village of Port Chester, New York

== Jurisdictions encompassed by the Section 203 bilingual elections requirement ==
The following jurisdictions are subject to the Section 203 bilingual elections requirement:

=== Alaska ===
- Aleutians East Borough (Yup'ik)
- Aleutians West Census Area (Filipino)
- Bethel Census Area (Yup'ik)
- Bristol Bay Borough (Yup'ik)
- Dillingham Census Area (Yup'ik)
- Kenai Peninsula Borough (Yup'ik)
- Kodiak Island Borough (Yup'ik, Filipino)
- Kusilvak Census Area (Yup'ik)
- Lake and Peninsula Borough (Aleut, Yup'ik)
- Nome Census Area (Yup'ik)
- North Slope Borough (Inupiat)
- Northwest Arctic Borough (Inupiat)
- Yukon-Koyukuk Census Area (Inupiat)

=== Arizona ===
- Apache County, Arizona (American Indian (Navajo, Pueblo))
- Coconino County, Arizona (American Indian (Hopi, Navajo, Paiute))
- Gila County, Arizona (American Indian (Apache))
- Graham County, Arizona (American Indian (Apache))
- Maricopa County, Arizona (Hispanic)
- Mohave County, Arizona (American Indian (Paiute))
- Navajo County, Arizona (American Indian (Hopi, Navajo))
- Pima County, Arizona (Hispanic)
- Pinal County, Arizona (American Indian (Apache))
- Santa Cruz County, Arizona (Hispanic)
- Yuma County, Arizona (Hispanic)

=== California ===
In addition to the jurisdictions enumerated below, California has state coverage for the Hispanic Language Minority Group.

- Alameda County, California (Chinese (including Taiwanese), Filipino, Hispanic, Vietnamese)
- Colusa County, California (Hispanic)
- Contra Costa County, California (Chinese (including Taiwanese), Hispanic))
- Del Norte County, California (American Indian (All other American Indian Tribes))
- Fresno County, California (Hispanic)
- Glenn County, California (Hispanic)
- Imperial County, California (Hispanic)
- Kern County, California (Hispanic)
- Kings County, California (Hispanic)
- Los Angeles County, California (Cambodian, Chinese (including Taiwanese), Filipino, Hispanic, Korean, Vietnamese))
- Madera County, California (Hispanic)
- Merced County, California (Hispanic)
- Monterey County, California (Hispanic)
- Orange County, California (Chinese (including Taiwanese), Hispanic, Korean, Vietnamese))
- Riverside County, California (Hispanic)
- Sacramento County, California (Chinese (including Taiwanese), Hispanic))
- San Benito County, California (Hispanic)
- San Bernardino County, California (Hispanic)
- San Diego County, California (American Indian (All other American Indian Tribes), Chinese (including Taiwanese), Filipino, Hispanic, Vietnamese))
- San Francisco County, California (Chinese (including Taiwanese), Hispanic))
- San Joaquin County, California (Hispanic)
- San Mateo County, California (Chinese (including Taiwanese), Hispanic))
- Santa Barbara County, California (Hispanic)
- Santa Clara County, California (Chinese (including Taiwanese), Filipino, Hispanic, Vietnamese))
- Stanislaus County, California (Hispanic)
- Tulare County, California (Hispanic)
- Ventura County, California (Hispanic)

=== Colorado ===
- Conejos County, Colorado (Hispanic)
- Costilla County, Colorado (Hispanic)
- Denver County, Colorado (Hispanic)
- La Plata County, Colorado (American Indian (Ute))
- Montezuma County, Colorado (American Indian (Ute))
- Saguache County, Colorado (Hispanic)

=== Connecticut ===
- Bridgeport, Connecticut (Hispanic)
- East Hartford, Connecticut (Hispanic)
- Hartford, Connecticut (Hispanic)
- Kent, Connecticut (American Indian (All other American Indian Tribes))
- Meriden, Connecticut (Hispanic)
- New Britain, Connecticut (Hispanic)
- New Haven, Connecticut (Hispanic)
- New London, Connecticut (Hispanic)
- Waterbury, Connecticut (Hispanic)
- Windham, Connecticut (Hispanic)

=== Florida ===
In addition to the jurisdictions enumerated below, Florida has state coverage for the Hispanic Language Minority Group.

- Broward County, Florida (Hispanic)
- DeSoto County, Florida (Hispanic)
- Hardee County, Florida (Hispanic)
- Hendry County, Florida (Hispanic)
- Hillsborough County, Florida (Hispanic)
- Lee County, Florida (Hispanic)
- Miami-Dade County, Florida (Hispanic)
- Orange County, Florida (Hispanic)
- Osceola County, Florida (Hispanic)
- Palm Beach County, Florida (Hispanic)
- Pinellas County, Florida (Hispanic)
- Polk County, Florida (Hispanic)
- Seminole County, Florida (Hispanic)

=== Georgia ===
- Gwinnett County, Georgia (Hispanic)

=== Hawaii ===
- Honolulu County (Chinese (including Taiwanese), Filipino))

=== Idaho ===
- Lincoln County, Idaho (Hispanic)

=== Illinois ===
- Cook County, Illinois (Asian Indian, Chinese (including Taiwanese), Hispanic))
- Kane County, Illinois (Hispanic)
- Lake County, Illinois (Hispanic)

=== Iowa ===
- Buena Vista County, Iowa (Hispanic)
- Tama County, Iowa (American Indian (All other American Indian Tribes))

=== Kansas ===
- Finney County, Kansas (Hispanic)
- Ford County, Kansas (Hispanic)
- Grant County, Kansas (Hispanic)
- Haskell County, Kansas (Hispanic)
- Seward County, Kansas (Hispanic)

=== Maryland ===
- Montgomery County, Maryland (Hispanic)

=== Massachusetts ===
- Boston, Massachusetts (Hispanic)
- Chelsea, Massachusetts (Hispanic)
- Holyoke, Massachusetts (Hispanic)
- Lawrence, Massachusetts (Hispanic)
- Lowell, Massachusetts (Cambodian, Hispanic)
- Lynn, Massachusetts (Hispanic)
- Malden, Massachusetts (Chinese (including Taiwanese))
- Quincy, Massachusetts (Chinese (including Taiwanese))
- Revere, Massachusetts (Hispanic)
- Southbridge, Massachusetts (Hispanic)
- Springfield, Massachusetts (Hispanic)
- Worcester, Massachusetts (Hispanic)

=== Michigan ===
- Clyde Township (Hispanic)
- Covert Township (Hispanic)
- Fennville (Hispanic)
- Hamtramck (Bangladeshi)

=== Minnesota ===
- Houston County (American Indian (All other American Indian Tribes))
- Ramsey County (Hmong)

=== Mississippi ===
- Attala County, Mississippi (American Indian (Choctaw))
- Jackson County, Mississippi (American Indian (Choctaw))
- Jones County, Mississippi (American Indian (Choctaw))
- Kemper County, Mississippi (American Indian (Choctaw))
- Leake County, Mississippi (American Indian (Choctaw))
- Neshoba County, Mississippi (American Indian (Choctaw))
- Newton County, Mississippi (American Indian (Choctaw))
- Noxubee County, Mississippi (American Indian (Choctaw))
- Scott County, Mississippi (American Indian (Choctaw))
- Winston County, Mississippi (American Indian (Choctaw))

=== Nebraska ===
- Colfax County, Nebraska (Hispanic)
- Dakota County, Nebraska (Hispanic)
- Dawson County, Nebraska (Hispanic)

=== Nevada ===
- Clark County, Nevada (Filipino, Hispanic)

=== New Jersey ===
- Bergen County, New Jersey (Hispanic, Korean)
- Camden County, New Jersey (Hispanic)
- Cumberland County, New Jersey (Hispanic)
- Essex County, New Jersey (Hispanic)
- Hudson County, New Jersey (Hispanic)
- Middlesex County, New Jersey (Asian Indian, Hispanic)
- Passaic County, New Jersey (Hispanic)
- Union County, New Jersey (Hispanic)

=== New Mexico ===
- Bernalillo County, New Mexico (American Indian (Navajo), Hispanic))
- Chaves County, New Mexico (Hispanic)
- Cibola County, New Mexico (American Indian (Navajo))
- Doña Ana County, New Mexico (Hispanic)
- Guadalupe County, New Mexico (Hispanic)
- Hidalgo County, New Mexico (Hispanic)
- Lea County, New Mexico (Hispanic)
- Lincoln County, New Mexico (American Indian (Apache))
- Luna County, New Mexico (Hispanic)
- McKinley County, New Mexico (American Indian (Navajo))
- Mora County, New Mexico (Hispanic)
- Otero County, New Mexico (American Indian (Apache))
- Rio Arriba County, New Mexico (American Indian (Navajo))
- San Juan County, New Mexico (American Indian (Navajo), American Indian (Ute))
- San Miguel County, New Mexico (Hispanic)
- Sandoval County, New Mexico (American Indian (Navajo), American Indian (Pueblo))
- Santa Fe County, New Mexico (American Indian (Pueblo))
- Socorro County, New Mexico (American Indian (Navajo), Hispanic))
- Union County, New Mexico (Hispanic)
- Valencia County, New Mexico (Hispanic)

=== New York ===
- Bronx County, New York (Hispanic)
- Kings County, New York (Chinese (including Taiwanese), Hispanic))
- Nassau County, New York (Hispanic)
- New York County, New York (Chinese (including Taiwanese), Hispanic))
- Queens County, New York (Asian Indian, Chinese (including Taiwanese), Hispanic, Korean))
- Suffolk County, New York (Hispanic)
- Westchester County, New York (Hispanic)

=== Oklahoma ===
- Texas County, Oklahoma (Hispanic)

=== Pennsylvania ===
- Berks County, Pennsylvania (Hispanic)
- Lehigh County, Pennsylvania (Hispanic)
- Philadelphia County, Pennsylvania (Hispanic)

=== Rhode Island ===
- Central Falls, Rhode Island (Hispanic)
- Pawtucket, Rhode Island (Hispanic)
- Providence, Rhode Island (Hispanic)

=== Texas ===
In addition to the jurisdictions enumerated below, Texas has state coverage for the Hispanic Language Minority Group.

- Andrews County, Texas (Hispanic)
- Atascosa County, Texas (Hispanic)
- Bailey County, Texas (Hispanic)
- Bee County, Texas (Hispanic)
- Bexar County, Texas (Hispanic)
- Brooks County, Texas (Hispanic)
- Caldwell County, Texas (Hispanic)
- Calhoun County, Texas (Hispanic)
- Cameron County, Texas (Hispanic)
- Castro County, Texas (Hispanic)
- Cochran County, Texas (Hispanic)
- Crane County, Texas (Hispanic)
- Crockett County, Texas (Hispanic)
- Crosby County, Texas (Hispanic)
- Culberson County, Texas (Hispanic)
- Dallam County, Texas (Hispanic)
- Dallas County, Texas (Hispanic)
- Dawson County, Texas (Hispanic)
- Deaf Smith County, Texas (Hispanic)
- Dimmit County, Texas (Hispanic)
- Duval County, Texas (Hispanic)
- Ector County, Texas (Hispanic)
- Edwards County, Texas (Hispanic)
- El Paso County, Texas (American Indian (Pueblo), Hispanic))
- Floyd County, Texas (Hispanic)
- Fort Bend County, Texas (Hispanic)
- Frio County, Texas (Hispanic)
- Gaines County, Texas (Hispanic)
- Garza County, Texas (Hispanic)
- Glasscock County, Texas (Hispanic)
- Hale County, Texas (Hispanic)
- Hansford County, Texas (Hispanic)
- Harris County, Texas (Chinese (including Taiwanese), Hispanic, Vietnamese))
- Hidalgo County, Texas (Hispanic)
- Hockley County, Texas (Hispanic)
- Hudspeth County, Texas (Hispanic)
- Jeff Davis County, Texas (Hispanic)
- Jim Hogg County, Texas (Hispanic)
- Jim Wells County, Texas (Hispanic)
- Jones County, Texas (Hispanic)
- Karnes County, Texas (Hispanic)
- Kenedy County, Texas (Hispanic)
- Kinney County, Texas (Hispanic)
- Kleberg County, Texas (Hispanic)
- Knox County, Texas (Hispanic)
- La Salle County, Texas (Hispanic)
- Lamb County, Texas (Hispanic)
- Live Oak County, Texas (Hispanic)
- Lynn County, Texas (Hispanic)
- Martin County, Texas (Hispanic)
- Matagorda County, Texas (Hispanic)
- Maverick County, Texas (American Indian (All other American Indian Tribes), Hispanic))
- McMullen County, Texas (Hispanic)
- Medina County, Texas (Hispanic)
- Menard County, Texas (Hispanic)
- Midland County, Texas (Hispanic)
- Moore County, Texas (Hispanic)
- Nolan County, Texas (Hispanic)
- Nueces County, Texas (Hispanic)
- Ochiltree County, Texas (Hispanic)
- Parmer County, Texas (Hispanic)
- Pecos County, Texas (Hispanic)
- Presidio County, Texas (Hispanic)
- Reagan County, Texas (Hispanic)
- Reeves County, Texas (Hispanic)
- Refugio County, Texas (Hispanic)
- San Patricio County, Texas (Hispanic)
- Schleicher County, Texas (Hispanic)
- Scurry County, Texas (Hispanic)
- Sherman County, Texas (Hispanic)
- Starr County, Texas (Hispanic)
- Sterling County, Texas (Hispanic)
- Sutton County, Texas (Hispanic)
- Swisher County, Texas (Hispanic)
- Tarrant County, Texas (Hispanic, Vietnamese)
- Terry County, Texas (Hispanic)
- Titus County, Texas (Hispanic)
- Travis County, Texas (Hispanic)
- Upton County, Texas (Hispanic)
- Uvalde County, Texas (Hispanic)
- Val Verde County, Texas (Hispanic)
- Ward County, Texas (Hispanic)
- Webb County, Texas (Hispanic)
- Willacy County, Texas (Hispanic)
- Winkler County, Texas (Hispanic)
- Yoakum County, Texas (Hispanic)
- Zapata County, Texas (Hispanic)
- Zavala County, Texas (Hispanic)

=== Utah ===
- San Juan County, Utah (American Indian (Navajo), American Indian (Ute))

=== Virginia ===
- Fairfax County, Virginia (Hispanic, Vietnamese)

=== Washington ===
- Adams County, Washington (Hispanic)
- Franklin County, Washington (Hispanic)
- King County, Washington (Chinese (including Taiwanese), Vietnamese))
- Yakima County, Washington (Hispanic)

=== Wisconsin ===
- Arcadia, Wisconsin (Hispanic)
- Madison, Wisconsin (Hispanic)
- Milwaukee, Wisconsin (Hispanic)
