= Monterey Center, Michigan =

- Unincorporated community
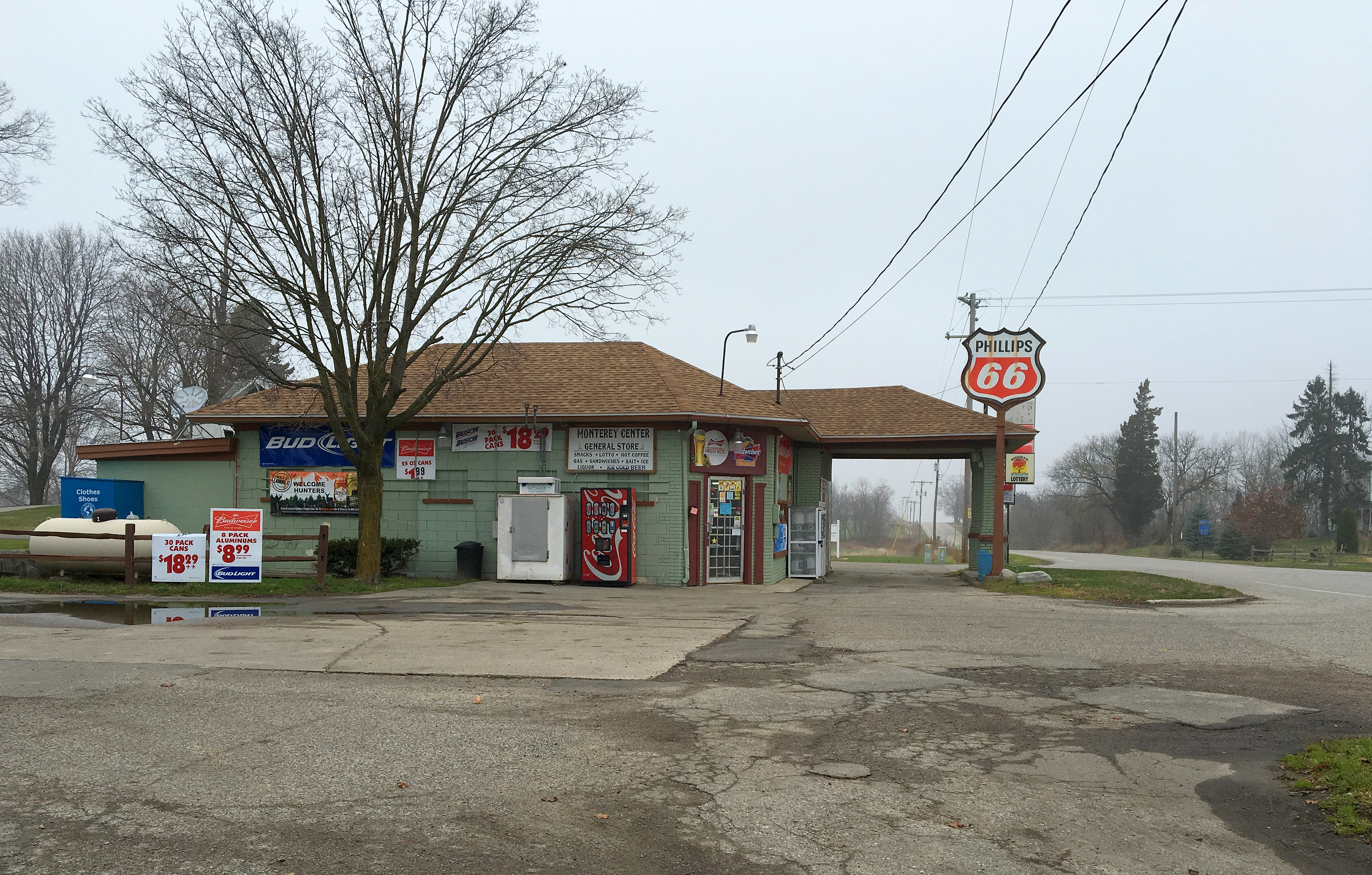
- Monterey Center General Store

- Location in Michigan Monterey Center, Michigan (the United States)
- Coordinates: 42°38′18″N 85°50′23″W
- Country: United States
- State: Michigan
- County: Allegan
- Elevation: 899 ft (274 m)
- Time zone: UTC-5 (Eastern (EST))
  - Summer (DST): UTC-4 (EDT)
- GNIS feature ID: 632602

Monterey Center is an unincorporated community in Allegan County, Michigan, United States.

== History ==
Monterey Center was settled in 1833. By 1873, the population was 175, and the settlement had a general store, hotel, and wagon maker. Produce and lumber were the chief industries.
