= Mary Whiteford =

American politician (born 1964)

Member of the Michigan House of Representatives from the 80th district
- In office March 15, 2016 – 2022
- Preceded by: Cindy Gamrat
- Succeeded by: Phil Skaggs

Personal details
- Born: November 10, 1964 (age 61)
- Party: Republican

Mary Whiteford (born November 10, 1964) is an American politician from Michigan. Whiteford was a Republican member of Michigan House of Representatives from District 80.

== Education ==
In 1986, Whiteford earned a BS degree in Registered Nursing from Northern Illinois University.

== Career ==
In 1986, Whiteford started her career as a staff nurse at Children's Memorial Medical Center. Whiteford left the medical center in 1999.

In 1997, Whiteford became a co-owner of Whiteford Wealth Management.

After the removal of Cindy Gamrat, the seat for District 80 was vacated. On November 3, 2015, Whiteford won the special primary election. On March 8, 2016, Whiteford won the special general election and became a Republican member of Michigan House of Representatives for District 80. Whiteford defeated David Gernant and Arnie Davidsons with 64.0% of the votes. On November 6, 2018, Whiteford won the election and continued serving District 80. Whiteford defeated Mark Ludwig with 63.65% of the votes.

== Personal life ==
Whiteford's husband is Kevin. They have 3 children. Whiteford and her family live in Casco Township, Michigan.

== See also ==
- 2014 Michigan House of Representatives election
- 2016 Michigan House of Representatives election
- 2018 Michigan House of Representatives election
