= Hopkins, Michigan =

- Village
- Location of Hopkins, Michigan
- Coordinates: 42°37′28″N 85°45′44″W
- Country: United States
- State: Michigan
- County: Allegan
- Established: 1854

Area
  - Total: 0.48 sq mi (1.24 km^{2})
  - Land: 0.48 sq mi (1.24 km^{2})
  - Water: 0 sq mi (0.00 km^{2})
- Elevation: 709 ft (216 m)

Population (2020)
  - Total: 615
  - Density: 1,285.3/sq mi (496.24/km^{2})
- Time zone: UTC-5 (Eastern (EST))
  - Summer (DST): UTC-4 (EDT)
- ZIP code: 49328
- Area code: 269
- FIPS code: 26-39180
- GNIS feature ID: 0628573
- Website: website

Hopkins, formerly Hopkins Station, is a village within Hopkins Township in Allegan County in the U.S. state of Michigan. The population was 615 at the 2020 census.

== History ==
John Hoffmaster settled here in 1854. On May 20, 1854, the Hopkins post office was opened with Erastus Congdon as its first postmaster. The Hopkins Station post office opened on March 28, 1870, with postmaster Henry F. Guyot. Hopkins Station was the name of the railroad depot opened in 1874. Hoffmaster became the first depot master and platted the village. On May 31, 1904, the Hopkins post office was closed. On June 6, 1906, the Hopkins Station post office was shortened to just Hopkins.

Hopkins was incorporated as a village in 1920. On January 31, 1929, Claude B. Hoffmaster became postmaster.

== Geography ==
According to the United States Census Bureau, the village has a total area of 0.48 square miles (1.24 km^{2}), all land.

=== Climate ===
This climatic region is typified by large seasonal temperature differences, with warm to hot (and often humid) summers and cold (sometimes severely cold) winters. According to the Köppen Climate Classification system, Hopkins has a humid continental climate, abbreviated "Dfb" on climate maps.

== Demographics ==
Historical population
Census	Pop.	Note	%±
1930	384		—
1940	455		18.5%
1950	531		16.7%
1960	556		4.7%
1970	566		1.8%
1980	536		−5.3%
1990	546		1.9%
2000	592		8.4%
2010	610		3.0%
2020	615		0.8%
U.S. Decennial Census

=== 2010 census ===
As of the census of 2010, there were 610 people, 227 households, and 166 families living in the village. The population density was 1,270.8 inhabitants per square mile (490.7/km^{2}). There were 247 housing units at an average density of 514.6 per square mile (198.7/km^{2}). The racial makeup of the village was 93.8% White, 1.3% Native American, 0.2% Asian, 1.6% from other races, and 3.1% from two or more races. Hispanic or Latino of any race were 3.9% of the population.

There were 227 households, of which 42.3% had children under the age of 18 living with them, 52.4% were married couples living together, 16.7% had a female householder with no husband present, 4.0% had a male householder with no wife present, and 26.9% were non-families. 23.8% of all households were made up of individuals, and 8.4% had someone living alone who was 65 years of age or older. The average household size was 2.69 and the average family size was 3.11.

The median age in the village was 32.7 years. 30.2% of residents were under the age of 18; 8.7% were between the ages of 18 and 24; 28.5% were from 25 to 44; 23.4% were from 45 to 64; and 9.2% were 65 years of age or older. The gender makeup of the village was 50.5% male and 49.5% female.

=== 2000 census ===
As of the census of 2000, there were 592 people, 219 households, and 162 families living in the village. The population density was 1,137.1 inhabitants per square mile (439.0/km^{2}). There were 229 housing units at an average density of 439.9 per square mile (169.8/km^{2}). The racial makeup of the village was 94.09% White, 0.51% African American, 1.86% Native American, 1.18% Asian, 0.17% from other races, and 2.20% from two or more races. Hispanic or Latino of any race were 1.01% of the population.

There were 219 households, out of which 39.3% had children under the age of 18 living with them, 56.2% were married couples living together, 14.2% had a female householder with no husband present, and 26.0% were non-families. 23.3% of all households were made up of individuals, and 9.1% had someone living alone who was 65 years of age or older. The average household size was 2.70 and the average family size was 3.19.

In the village, the population was spread out, with 29.9% under the age of 18, 10.1% from 18 to 24, 28.5% from 25 to 44, 19.4% from 45 to 64, and 12.0% who were 65 years of age or older. The median age was 34 years. For every 100 females, there were 100.7 males. For every 100 females age 18 and over, there were 100.5 males.

The median income for a household in the village was $38,462, and the median income for a family was $39,583. Males had a median income of $31,500 versus $22,500 for females. The per capita income for the village was $16,667. About 8.5% of families and 8.9% of the population were below the poverty line, including 5.4% of those under age 18 and 8.5% of those age 65 or over.

== Government ==
As a village, Hopkins is provided assessing, counties and school districts tax collecting and elections administration for county, state and national by Hopkins Township. The village is responsible for local regulatory ordinances, public safety, public works, and other local services, however, the village dissolved it's police department prior to the COVID-19 pandemic.

Hopkins is a home rule village. Per its charter the village charter provides for a board of trustees of six. Trustees serve two year elected terms. One year term elected official are the president, clerk, treasurer and assessor.
