= Pullman, Michigan =

- Unincorporated community
- Location within the state of Michigan
- Coordinates: 42°29′01″N 86°05′29″W
- Country: United States
- State: Michigan
- County: Allegan
- Township: Lee
- Elevation: 650 ft (200 m)
- Time zone: UTC-5 (Eastern (EST))
  - Summer (DST): UTC-4 (EDT)
- Area code: 269
- GNIS feature ID: 635511

Pullman is an unincorporated community in Lee Township, Allegan County, in the U.S. state of Michigan. It is in a predominantly rural area of Western Michigan, about 150 miles (240 km) east of Chicago. It is centered on the junction of 109th Avenue and 56th Street between sections eight and nine of Lee Township at 42°29′01″N 86°05′29″W. It is approximately 10 miles (16 km) northeast of South Haven, about 13 miles (21 km) southeast of Saugatuck–Douglas, and six miles (9.7 km) west-southwest of Allegan. The Upper, Lower, and Western Scott Lakes are nearby, which empty into the Scott Creek Drain, a tributary of the Middle Branch of the Black River.

Two brothers named Clement built a sawmill in 1870. A station on the Chicago and West Michigan Railway (later part of the Pere Marquette Railway) was established in 1871 and the area became known as "Hoppertown", after an area landowner. A post office with that name operated from 1875 to 1880 and began again in 1891. The post office was renamed Pullman in 1901, apparently after George Pullman. The ZIP code for Pullman is 49450.
