= Allegan State Game Area =

Forest in Michigan, United States

- Location within Michigan Location within the United States
- Location: Allegan County, Michigan
- Nearest city: Allegan, Michigan
- Coordinates: 42°33′51″N 85°59′46″W
- Area: 50,000 acres (200 km^{2})
- Governing body: Michigan Department of Natural Resources

Allegan State Game Area is a 50,000-acre (200 km^{2}) forest attracting campers, hikers, bikers snowmobilers, cross-country skiers, horse trail riders and hunters. It is located in west-central Allegan County, Michigan, with one gateway just west of the city of Allegan. It is more commonly referred to as Allegan Forest.

== Camping ==
It has two primitive campgrounds, one owned by the state of Michigan but operated by Allegan County. Ely Lake Campground is on Ely Lake, a small inland lake while the Silver Creek Campground is owned and operated by Allegan County. They both have picnic tables and fire pits at each campsite and vault toilets and water pump stations. Ely Lake, a non-motorized boat lake has a swimming beach and Silver Creek has a shallow spring-fed creek. They both welcome tent and hammock camping, as they are located in a heavily forested area. There are camping fees and reservations can be made. Silver Creek Campground also has a pavilion for day use with picnic tables and fire pits. Silver Creek Campground is in a good location for road biking as all the roads leading to Silver Creek are paved country roads, even though within the campground the roads are dirt.

The forest is a mixture, but largely hardwood. The Kalamazoo River flows through the northern portion. It is popular with canoeists and fisherman. Behind the Calkins Bridge Dam the Kalamazoo becomes the large, but shallow, Lake Allegan.

== Geography ==
During hunting season, many come to hunt whitetail deer, Canada geese and wild turkeys.

Trails are laid out for hikers and horse riders in the summer and snowmobilers and cross-country skiers in the winter.

The forest is broken up by private ownership with sections of woods and sections of homes. The state occasionally buys private land to add to the forest and fill in the gaps.
