= Allegan County, Michigan =

County in Michigan, United States

- County
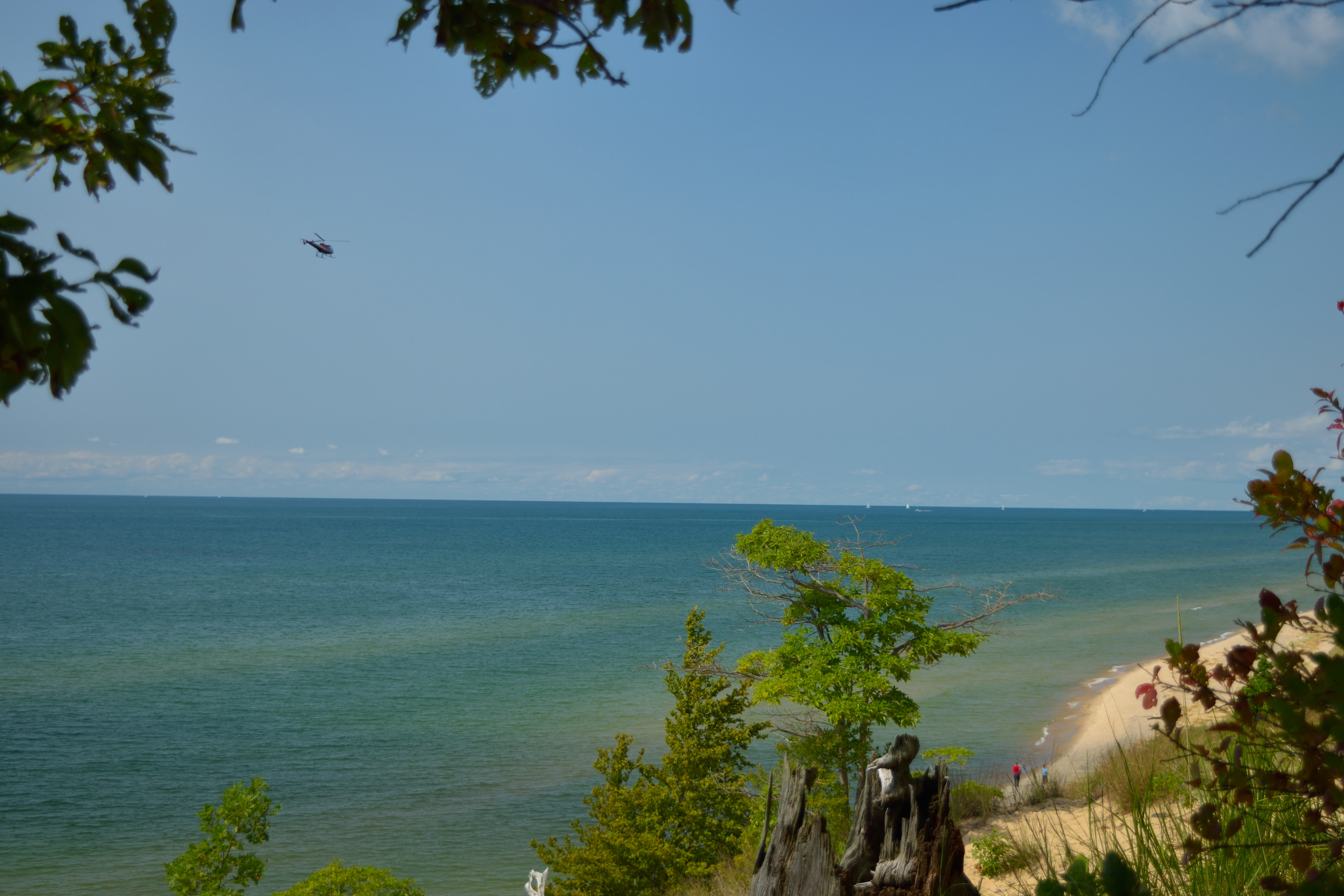
- Saugatuck Dunes State Park

- Location within the U.S. state of Michigan
- Coordinates: 42°35′N 85°54′W
- Country: United States
- State: Michigan
- Established: 1831
- Organized: 1835
- Seat: Allegan
- Largest city: Holland

Area
  - Total: 1,833 sq mi (4,750 km^{2})
  - Land: 825 sq mi (2,140 km^{2})
  - Water: 1,008 sq mi (2,610 km^{2}) 55%

Population (2020)
  - Total: 120,502
  - Estimate (2025): 123,188 ▲
  - Density: 146/sq mi (56.4/km^{2})
- Time zone: UTC−5 (Eastern)
  - Summer (DST): UTC−4 (EDT)
- Congressional district: 4th
- Website: http://www.allegancounty.org

Allegan County (/ˈæləɡən/ AL-ə-gən) is a county in the U.S. state of Michigan. As of the 2020 United States census, the population was 120,502. The county seat is Allegan. The name was coined by Henry Rowe Schoolcraft to sound like a Native American word. Allegan County comprises the Holland, Michigan Micropolitan Statistical Area, which is included in the Grand Rapids–Kentwood–Muskegon Combined Statistical Area. It is primarily an agricultural area that is rapidly becoming urbanized as the population centers of Grand Rapids on the northeast and Kalamazoo to the southeast expand into Allegan County.

The county has long been a regional tourist draw, particularly the Tulip Time Festival in Holland and the area along Lake Michigan. The Lake Michigan shoreline has long been a popular place for vacation homes, and that development continues, especially around Saugatuck and Douglas. Another draw is Allegan State Game Area, a 45,000 acres (180 km^{2}) forest attracting campers, snowmobilers, cross-country skiers and hunters. Allegan County contains Saugatuck Dunes State Park with trails through scenic dunes and a swimming beach on Lake Michigan. The county also contains Pier Cove Park, a public beach with Lake Michigan access. Lake Allegan is a popular destination.

== History ==
The Michigan peninsula was long occupied by bands of the Pottawatomi and Ojibwe of the Lake Superior Band of Chippewa Indians. The United States government forced the tribes to cede their extensive territories to the federal government, in exchange for annuities and small reservations. The federally recognized Match-e-be-nash-she-wish Band of Pottawatomi has a reservation here.

The boundaries of Allegan County were laid out by the Territorial legislature in 1831. The county was organized in 1835. At that time there were only about four European-American families in the area. Among the first settlers of Allegan County were Giles Scott and Turner Aldrich.

== Geography ==
According to the US Census Bureau, the county has a total area of 1,833 sq mi (4,750 km^{2}), of which 825 sq mi (2,140 km^{2}) is land and 1,008 sq mi (2,610 km^{2}) (55%) is water.

=== Adjacent counties ===
By land

- Ottawa County – north
- Kent County – northeast
- Barry County – east
- Kalamazoo County – southeast
- Van Buren County – south

By water

- Lake County, Illinois – southwest
- Kenosha County, Wisconsin – west
- Racine County, Wisconsin – northwest

== Transportation ==
=== Major highways ===
- I-196
- BL I-196
- US 31
- Bus. US 31
- US 131
- M-40
- M-89
- M-179
- M-222
- A-2
- A-37
- A-42
- A-45

== Demographics ==
Historical population
Census	Pop.	Note	%±
1840	1,783		—
1850	5,125		187.4%
1860	16,087		213.9%
1870	32,105		99.6%
1880	37,815		17.8%
1890	38,961		3.0%
1900	38,812		−0.4%
1910	39,819		2.6%
1920	37,540		−5.7%
1930	38,974		3.8%
1940	41,839		7.4%
1950	47,493		13.5%
1960	57,729		21.6%
1970	66,575		15.3%
1980	81,555		22.5%
1990	90,509		11.0%
2000	105,665		16.7%
2010	111,408		5.4%
2020	120,502		8.2%
2025 (est.)	123,188	▲	2.2%
US Decennial Census; 1790–1960 1900–1990; 1990–2000 2010–2019

=== Racial and ethnic composition ===
Allegan County, Michigan – Racial and ethnic composition Note: the US Census treats Hispanic/Latino as an ethnic category. This table excludes Latinos from the racial categories and assigns them to a separate category. Hispanics/Latinos may be of any race.
Race / Ethnicity (NH = Non-Hispanic)	Pop 1980	Pop 1990	Pop 2000	Pop 2010	Pop 2020	% 1980	% 1990	% 2000	% 2010	% 2020
White alone (NH)	77,440	85,241	96,167	99,945	103,088	94.95%	94.18%	91.01%	89.71%	85.55%
Black or African American alone (NH)	1,450	1,419	1,315	1,264	1,446	1.78%	1.57%	1.24%	1.13%	1.20%
Native American or Alaska Native alone (NH)	408	514	520	543	561	0.50%	0.57%	0.49%	0.49%	0.47%
Asian alone (NH)	190	396	562	620	839	0.23%	0.44%	0.53%	0.56%	0.70%
Native Hawaiian or Pacific Islander alone (NH)	x	x	17	21	20	x	x	0.02%	0.02%	0.02%
Other race alone (NH)	56	44	65	68	433	0.07%	0.05%	0.06%	0.06%	0.36%
Mixed race or Multiracial (NH)	x	x	979	1,493	4,726	x	x	0.93%	1.34%	3.92%
Hispanic or Latino (any race)	2,011	2,895	6,040	7,454	9,389	2.47%	3.20%	5.72%	6.69%	7.79%
Total	81,555	90,509	105,665	111,408	120,502	100.00%	100.00%	100.00%	100.00%	100.00%

=== 2020 census ===
As of the 2020 census, the county had a population of 120,502. The median age was 40.3 years. 24.2% of residents were under the age of 18 and 17.3% of residents were 65 years of age or older. For every 100 females there were 100.8 males, and for every 100 females age 18 and over there were 99.8 males age 18 and over.

The racial makeup of the county was 87.6% White, 1.3% Black or African American, 0.7% American Indian and Alaska Native, 0.7% Asian, <0.1% Native Hawaiian and Pacific Islander, 3.4% from some other race, and 6.3% from two or more races. Hispanic or Latino residents of any race comprised 7.8% of the population.

32.4% of residents lived in urban areas, while 67.6% lived in rural areas.

There were 45,545 households in the county, of which 31.3% had children under the age of 18 living in them. Of all households, 56.9% were married-couple households, 16.2% were households with a male householder and no spouse or partner present, and 20.1% were households with a female householder and no spouse or partner present. About 23.0% of all households were made up of individuals and 10.1% had someone living alone who was 65 years of age or older.

There were 51,789 housing units, of which 12.1% were vacant. Among occupied housing units, 82.5% were owner-occupied and 17.5% were renter-occupied. The homeowner vacancy rate was 1.1% and the rental vacancy rate was 6.1%.

=== 2010 census ===
As of the 2010 United States census, there were 111,408 people living in the county. 92.9% were White, 1.2% Black or African American, 0.6% Asian, 0.6% Native American, 2.8% of some other race and 1.9% of two or more races. 6.7% were Hispanic or Latino (of any race). 23.0% were of Dutch, 17.5% German, 8.3% English, 7.1% Irish and 7.1% American ancestry.

=== 2000 census ===
As of the 2000 United States census, there were 105,665 people, 38,165 households, and 28,394 families living in the county. The population density was 128 inhabitants per square mile (49/km^{2}). There were 43,292 housing units at an average density of 52 per square mile (20/km^{2}). The racial makeup of the county was 93.47% White, 1.31% Black or African American, 0.55% Native American, 0.55% Asian, 0.03% Pacific Islander, 2.77% from other races, and 1.32% from two or more races. 5.72% of the population were Hispanic or Latino of any race. 25.6% were of Dutch, 17.8% German, 9.6% American, 8.4% English and 7.2% Irish ancestry, 93.6% spoke only English; 5.2% spoke Spanish at home.

There were 38,165 households, out of which 37.40% had children under the age of 18 living with them, 61.40% were married couples living together, 9.10% had a female householder with no husband present, and 25.60% were non-families. 20.70% of all households were made up of individuals, and 7.80% had someone living alone who was 65 years of age or older. The average household size was 2.72 and the average family size was 3.15.

The county population contained 28.90% under the age of 18, 8.00% from 18 to 24, 30.00% from 25 to 44, 22.00% from 45 to 64, and 11.10% who were 65 years of age or older. The median age was 35 years. For every 100 females, there were 99.60 males. For every 100 females age 18 and over, there were 97.60 males.

The median income for a household in the county was $45,813, and the median income for a family was $51,908. Males had a median income of $38,681 versus $26,887 for females. The per capita income for the county was $19,918. About 5.00% of families and 7.30% of the population were below the poverty line, including 7.50% of those under age 18 and 7.90% of those age 65 or over.

=== Religion ===
- The Reformed Church in America was the largest Protestant denomination with 4,500 members in 11 churches.
- The United Methodist Church was second, with 3,600 congregants in 20 churches.
- The Christian Reformed Church was third, with 10 churches and 2,600 members.
- The Catholic Church has 10,000 members as of 2010.
- The Church of Jesus Christ of Latter-day Saints has one meetinghouse.

== Government ==
The county government operates the jail, maintains rural roads, operates the major local courts, records deeds, mortgages, and vital records, administers public health regulations, and participates with the state in the provision of social services. The county board of commissioners controls the budget and has limited authority to make laws or ordinances. In Michigan, most local government functions—police and fire, building and zoning, tax assessment, street maintenance, etc.—are the responsibility of individual cities and townships.

=== Elected officials ===
- Prosecuting Attorney: Michael Villar
- Sheriff: Frank L. Baker
- Chief 48th Circuit Court Judge: Hon. Michael Antkoviak
- 48th Circuit Court Judge: Hon. Margaret Bakker
- 57th District Court Judge: Hon. Joseph Skocelas
- 57th District Court Judge: Hon. William Baillargeon
- Family Court Judge: Hon. Jolene Clearwater
- County Clerk/Register of Deeds: Bob Genetski
- County Treasurer: Sally L. Brooks
- Drain Commissioner: Chris Machiela
- County Surveyor: Kevin D. Miedema

(Information as of January 2025)

== Politics ==
Allegan County has been strongly Republican from its start. Since 1884, the Republican nominee has carried the county in all but one presidential election. It is very Republican even by the standards of West Michigan, rejecting Democrats even in national landslides. Underlining this, it was one of the few counties in the nation where Franklin D. Roosevelt was completely shut out in all four of his successful runs for president. FDR actually garnered fewer votes in the county in his 46-state landslide of 1936 than he did in 1932. In 1964, Lyndon Johnson became the only Democrat to carry the county since 1884, and even then only by 701 votes; it was the last time a Democrat managed even 40 percent of the county's vote until Barack Obama received 43.63 percent of its vote in 2008. The only other time that the Republicans lost the county in the 20th century was in 1912, when the GOP was mortally divided and Theodore Roosevelt carried it on the Bull Moose ticket.

United States presidential election results for Allegan County, Michigan
Year	Republican		Democratic		Third party(ies)	
Year	No.	%	No.	%	No.	%
1884	4,080	48.27%	3,445	40.75%	928	10.98%
1888	5,078	52.01%	3,829	39.22%	856	8.77%
1892	4,283	50.96%	3,207	38.16%	915	10.89%
1896	5,810	57.85%	3,937	39.20%	296	2.95%
1900	5,590	61.13%	3,275	35.82%	279	3.05%
1904	5,589	73.98%	1,576	20.86%	390	5.16%
1908	5,422	67.32%	2,186	27.14%	446	5.54%
1912	2,121	27.92%	1,925	25.34%	3,550	46.74%
1916	4,803	54.81%	3,591	40.98%	369	4.21%
1920	7,825	75.89%	2,154	20.89%	332	3.22%
1924	9,417	79.32%	1,562	13.16%	893	7.52%
1928	10,792	81.65%	2,358	17.84%	67	0.51%
1932	8,705	54.13%	7,030	43.71%	347	2.16%
1936	9,247	57.41%	5,922	36.77%	937	5.82%
1940	12,347	69.40%	5,385	30.27%	60	0.34%
1944	12,327	73.04%	4,480	26.54%	71	0.42%
1948	10,439	67.68%	4,594	29.78%	391	2.54%
1952	15,663	73.40%	5,437	25.48%	238	1.12%
1956	16,509	74.44%	5,617	25.33%	51	0.23%
1960	16,660	70.98%	6,752	28.77%	60	0.26%
1964	11,223	48.39%	11,934	51.45%	37	0.16%
1968	14,769	60.32%	7,276	29.72%	2,438	9.96%
1972	18,407	68.47%	7,883	29.32%	594	2.21%
1976	19,330	65.59%	9,794	33.23%	347	1.18%
1980	20,560	62.24%	9,877	29.90%	2,594	7.85%
1984	23,762	73.48%	8,389	25.94%	187	0.58%
1988	22,163	66.78%	10,785	32.50%	240	0.72%
1992	19,077	46.72%	12,823	31.40%	8,935	21.88%
1996	20,859	53.77%	14,361	37.02%	3,570	9.20%
2000	28,197	62.81%	15,495	34.52%	1,199	2.67%
2004	34,022	63.11%	19,355	35.90%	530	0.98%
2008	30,061	54.28%	24,165	43.63%	1,154	2.08%
2012	31,123	58.97%	20,806	39.42%	846	1.60%
2016	34,183	60.91%	18,050	32.16%	3,887	6.93%
2020	41,392	61.60%	24,449	36.39%	1,354	2.02%
2024	45,206	62.86%	25,637	35.65%	1,070	1.49%

United States Senate election results for Allegan County, Michigan1
Year	Republican		Democratic		Third party(ies)	
Year	No.	%	No.	%	No.	%
2024	44,205	61.94%	25,193	35.30%	1,972	2.76%

Michigan Gubernatorial election results for Allegan County
Year	Republican		Democratic		Third party(ies)	
Year	No.	%	No.	%	No.	%
2022	33,590	58.58%	22,802	39.76%	950	1.66%

== Arts and Culture ==
Allegan County is part of the annual Arts and Eats tour, which highlights local art, food, and farms.

== Communities ==
=== Cities ===
- Allegan (county seat)
- Douglas
- Fennville
- Holland (partial)
- Otsego
- Plainwell
- Saugatuck
- South Haven (partial)
- Wayland

=== Villages ===
- Hopkins
- Martin

=== Census-designated place ===
- Dorr

=== Unincorporated communities ===
- Argenta
- Bakersville
- Beachmont
- Bentheim
- Belknap
- Bradley
- Bravo
- Boyd
- Burnips
- Castle Park
- Cedar Bluff
- Cheshire
- Chicora
- Corning
- Diamond Springs
- Dunningville
- East Saugatuck
- East Martin
- Fillmore
- Ganges
- Glenn
- Glenn Haven Shores
- Glenn Shores
- Graafschap
- Grange Corners
- Green Lake
- Hamilton
- Hawkhead
- Hilliards
- Hooper
- Hopkinsburg
- Kibbie
- Lacota
- Lee
- Leisure
- Macatawa
- Macks Landing
- Merson
- Miami Park
- Millgrove
- Moline
- Monteith Station
- Monterey
- Monterey Center
- Mount Pleasant
- Neeley
- New Salem
- New Richmond
- Old Saugatuck
- Old Squaw Skin Landing
- Overisel
- Oxbow
- Pearl
- Pier Cove
- Plummerville
- Pullman
- Sandy Pines
- Shelbyville
- Sherman Park
- Shorecrest
- Shorewood
- South Haven Highlands
- South Monterey
- Spring Grove
- Sulphur Springs
- Watson

=== Townships ===
- Allegan Township
- Casco Township
- Cheshire Township
- Clyde Township
- Dorr Township
- Fillmore Township
- Ganges Township
- Gun Plain Charter Township
- Heath Township
- Hopkins Township
- Laketown Township
- Lee Township
- Leighton Township
- Manlius Township
- Martin Township
- Monterey Township
- Otsego Township
- Overisel Township
- Salem Township
- Saugatuck Township
- Trowbridge Township
- Valley Township
- Watson Township
- Wayland Township

== Education ==
K-12 school districts include:

- Allegan Public Schools
- Bloomingdale Public School District
- Caledonia Community Schools
- Delton-Kellogg School District
- Fennville Public Schools
- Gobles Public School District
- Hamilton Community Schools
- Holland City School District
- Hopkins Public Schools
- Hudsonville Public School District;
- Martin Public Schools
- Otsego Public Schools
- Plainwell Community Schools
- Saugatuck Public Schools
- South Haven Public Schools
- Thornapple Kellogg School District
- Wayland Union Schools
- Zeeland Public Schools

There is one elementary-only school district: Ganges School District 4.

== See also ==
- List of Michigan State Historic Sites in Allegan County
- National Register of Historic Places listings in Allegan County, Michigan
