= Casco Township, Allegan County, Michigan =

Casco Township, Michigan
- Township
- Location within the state of Michigan
- Coordinates: 42°28′16″N 86°12′33″W
- Country: United States
- State: Michigan
- County: Allegan

Area
  - Total: 39.0 sq mi (100.9 km^{2})
  - Land: 38.9 sq mi (100.7 km^{2})
  - Water: 0.077 sq mi (0.2 km^{2})
- Elevation: 630 ft (192 m)

Population (2020)
  - Total: 2,796
  - Density: 71.91/sq mi (27.77/km^{2})
- Time zone: UTC-5 (Eastern (EST))
  - Summer (DST): UTC-4 (EDT)
- FIPS code: 26-13700
- GNIS feature ID: 1626038
- Website: www.cascotownship.info

Casco Township is a civil township of Allegan County in the U.S. state of Michigan. The population was 2,796 at the 2020 census.

== Communities ==
There no villages within the township but there are several unincorporated communities:

- Cedar Bluff is located along the Lake Michigan shore and north of 109th Avenue off Blue Star Highway (42°29′08″N 86°14′46″W Elevation: 689 ft/210 m).
- Glenn Haven Shores, also known as Hollywood, is located east of the Lake Michigan shore and north of Cedar Bluff off Blue Star Memorial Highway (42°29′33″N 86°14′15″W Elevation: 679 ft/207 m).
- Glenn Shores, or Glenn Stores, is located north of Glenn Haven Shores, east of Lake Michigan and west of Blue Star Memorial Highway (42°30′07″N 86°14′34″W Elevation: 659 ft/201 m).
- Hawkhead, also known as Hawk Head and Hawks Head, is located at the junction of 107th Avenue and 68th Street (42°28′10″N 86°12′26″W Elevation: 623 ft/190 m). A post office operated here from March 23, 1882, to January 31, 1902.
- Kibbie is on the boundary with Geneva Township, Van Buren County at 66th Street and Baseline Road.
- Lacota is a shared community at the southeast corner boundary with Geneva Township, Van Buren County and Lee Township.
- Leisure, also known as East Casco, is located at the junction of 107th Avenue and 64th Street (42°28′10″N 86°10′06″W Elevation: 686 ft/209 m). A post office operated here from April 29, 1892, to March 31, 1903.
- Miami Park, also known as Miami Park Beach or Miomi Park Beach, is located along the Lake Michigan shore north of Mount Pleasant and south of 107th Avenue (42°27′55″N 086°15′00″W Elevation: 676 ft/206 m).
- Mount Pleasant is located between the Lake Michigan shore and Blue Star Highway from Beethoven Street to A Street (42°27′28″N 86°15′06″W Elevation: 650 ft/198 m).
- South Haven Highlands is located between the Lake Michigan shore and Blue Star Highway from Elm to 4th Avenue (42°27′06″N 86°15′23″W Elevation: 663 ft/202 m).
- Spring Grove is located north of Leisure on 64th Street near the Ganges Township line (42°30′20″N 86°10′06″W Elevation: 682 ft/208 m).

== History ==
Casco Township was established in 1854 by the division of Ganges Township. New Casco was the name of a post office here starting on December 8, 1856. In 1876, the New Casco post office was renamed Glenn on May 15, 1876. A post office operated at Hawkhead from March 23, 1882, to January 31, 1902.

== Geography ==
According to the United States Census Bureau, the township has a total area of 39.0 square miles (100.9 km^{2}), of which 38.9 square miles (100.7 km^{2}) is land and 0.077 square miles (0.2 km^{2}), or 0.17%, is water.

== Demographics ==
Historical population
Census	Pop.	Note	%±
1960	2,009		—
1970	2,304		14.7%
1980	2,839		23.2%
1990	2,856		0.6%
2000	3,019		5.7%
2010	2,823		−6.5%
2020	2,796		−1.0%
Source: Census Bureau. Census 1960- 2000, 2010.

As of the census of 2000, there were 3,019 people, 1,083 households, and 794 families residing in the township. The population density was 77.7 inhabitants per square mile (30.0/km^{2}). There were 1,827 housing units at an average density of 47.0 per square mile (18.1/km^{2}). The racial makeup of the township was 88.14% White, 3.41% African American, 0.70% Native American, 0.40% Asian, 5.47% from other races, and 1.89% from two or more races. Hispanic or Latino of any race were 11.39% of the population.

There were 1,083 households, out of which 30.3% had children under the age of 18 living with them, 61.8% were married couples living together, 6.9% had a female householder with no husband present, and 26.6% were non-families. 22.4% of all households were made up of individuals, and 8.7% had someone living alone who was 65 years of age or older. The average household size was 2.63 and the average family size was 3.05.

In the township the population was spread out, with 25.8% under the age of 18, 8.3% from 18 to 24, 26.8% from 25 to 44, 26.9% from 45 to 64, and 12.2% who were 65 years of age or older. The median age was 38 years. For every 100 females, there were 107.1 males. For every 100 females age 18 and over, there were 106.7 males.

The median income for a household in the township was $45,043, and the median income for a family was $49,821. Males had a median income of $36,935 versus $27,412 for females. The per capita income for the township was $22,356. About 4.3% of families and 8.5% of the population were below the poverty line, including 9.0% of those under age 18 and 2.3% of those age 65 or over.
