= Lee Township, Allegan County, Michigan =

Lee Township, Michigan
- Township
- Location within the state of Michigan
- Coordinates: 42°27′44″N 86°4′33″W
- Country: United States
- State: Michigan
- County: Allegan

Area
  - Total: 36.1 sq mi (93.5 km^{2})
  - Land: 35.2 sq mi (91.1 km^{2})
  - Water: 0.93 sq mi (2.4 km^{2})
- Elevation: 659 ft (201 m)

Population (2020)
  - Total: 3,805
  - Density: 108/sq mi (41.8/km^{2})
- Time zone: UTC-5 (Eastern (EST))
  - Summer (DST): UTC-4 (EDT)
- FIPS code: 26-46600
- GNIS feature ID: 1626598
- Website: www.leetwp.org

Lee Township is a civil township of Allegan County in the U.S. state of Michigan. The population was 3,805 at the 2020 census.

The township is rural with the population living mostly around the lakes. A small portion of the Allegan State Game Area is in the township.

CSX Transportation has a rail line that goes through the township in a north–south direction. The line also carries Amtrak traffic, but does not stop within the township. No major highways go through Lee Township.

== Communities ==
There no villages within the township, but there are several unincorporated communities:

- Bakersville is located on the northeast side of Lower Scott Lake (42°29′24″N 86°04′11″W Elevation: 659 ft/201 m).
- Lacota is a shared community at the southwest corner boundary with Geneva Township, Van Buren County and Casco Township.
- Lee is located on 56th Street between 105 Avenue and 104 Avenue (42°27′03″N 86°05′27″W Elevation: 650 ft./198 m.).
- Pullman
- Sherman Park is located on the northwest side of Lower Scott Lake (42°29′31″N 86°04′55″W Elevation: 666 ft./203 m.).

== Geography ==
According to the United States Census Bureau, the township has a total area of 36.1 square miles (93.5 km^{2}), of which 35.2 square miles (91.1 km^{2}) is land and 0.93 square miles (2.4 km^{2}), or 2.56%, is water.

== Demographics ==
Historical population
Census	Pop.	Note	%±
1960	1,327		—
1970	1,934		45.7%
1980	2,249		16.3%
1990	2,672		18.8%
2000	4,114		54.0%
2010	4,015		−2.4%
2020	3,805		−5.2%
Source: Census Bureau. Census 1960- 2000, 2010.

As of the census of 2000, there were 4,114 people, 1,313 households, and 983 families residing in the township. The population density was 116.4 inhabitants per square mile (44.9/km^{2}). There were 1,807 housing units at an average density of 51.1 per square mile (19.7/km^{2}). The racial makeup of the township was 74.53% White, 7.73% African American, 0.95% Native American, 0.29% Asian, 12.86% from other races, and 3.65% from two or more races. Hispanic or Latino of any race were 21.10% of the population.

There were 1,313 households, out of which 43.0% had children under the age of 18 living with them, 53.3% were married couples living together, 14.8% had a female householder with no husband present, and 25.1% were non-families. 18.1% of all households were made up of individuals, and 5.6% had someone living alone who was 65 years of age or older. The average household size was 3.09 and the average family size was 3.48.

In the township the population was spread out, with 34.7% under the age of 18, 11.0% from 18 to 24, 29.7% from 25 to 44, 17.1% from 45 to 64, and 7.5% who were 65 years of age or older. The median age was 28 years. For every 100 females, there were 104.7 males. For every 100 females age 18 and over, there were 105.4 males.

The median income for a household in the township was $30,875, and the median income for a family was $32,688. Males had a median income of $28,789 versus $23,563 for females. The per capita income for the township was $11,836. About 16.6% of families and 21.1% of the population were below the poverty line, including 23.7% of those under age 18 and 17.7% of those age 65 or over.
