= Overisel Township, Michigan =

- Township
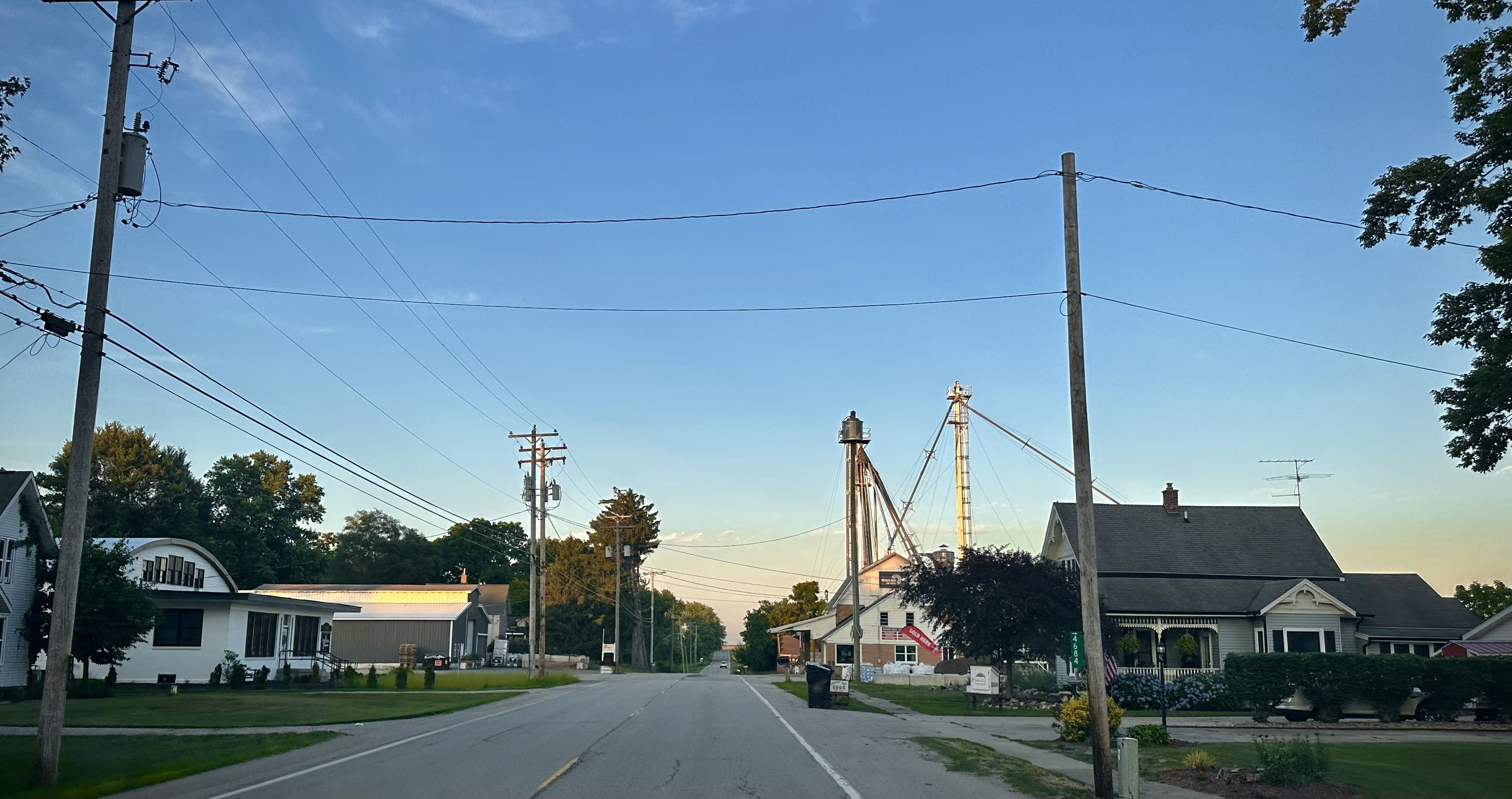
- Overisel Township in 2023

- Location within the state of Michigan
- Coordinates: 42°43′6″N 85°57′47″W
- Country: United States
- State: Michigan
- County: Allegan

Area
  - Total: 35.7 sq mi (92.5 km^{2})
  - Land: 35.6 sq mi (92.3 km^{2})
  - Water: 0.077 sq mi (0.2 km^{2})
- Elevation: 659 ft (201 m)

Population (2020)
  - Total: 3,113
  - Density: 87.9/sq mi (33.94/km^{2})
- Time zone: UTC-5 (Eastern (EST))
  - Summer (DST): UTC-4 (EDT)
- FIPS code: 26-61820
- GNIS feature ID: 1626872
- Website: www.overiseltownship.org

Overisel Township is a civil township of Allegan County in the U.S. state of Michigan. The population was 3,113 at the 2020 census.

Overisel was named after the Dutch province of Overijssel. Overisel is the birthplace of mathematician George David Birkhoff, best known for what is now called the ergodic theorem.

== Communities ==
- Bentheim is a Dutch and German community that was also settled in the mid-1800s. Bentheim is found near the Rabbit River on the far Eastern edge of the Township.
- Drenthe is a Dutch community that was first settled by Jan Hulst in 1847. His family's journey from Baltimore took six weeks when made by ox-cart in June 1847.
- Overisel is a tightly knit community found in the far western part of Overisel Township and was settled in 1848 by Dutch immigrants consisting of only 12 families at the time. The village consists of two Churches, (Reformed and Christian Reformed) as well as a feed mill and dozens of family-owned farms.

== Geography ==
According to the United States Census Bureau, the township has a total area of 35.7 square miles (92.5 km^{2}), of which 35.6 square miles (92.3 km^{2}) is land and 0.077 square miles (0.2 km^{2}), or 0.22%, is water.

== Demographics ==
Historical population
Census	Pop.	Note	%±
1960	1,688		—
1970	1,881		11.4%
1980	2,248		19.5%
1990	2,324		3.4%
2000	2,613		12.4%
2010	2,911		11.4%
2020	3,113		6.9%
Source: Census Bureau. Census 1960- 2000, 2010.

As of the census of 2000, there were 2,594 people, 869 households, and 730 families residing in the township. The population density was 72.4 inhabitants per square mile (28.0/km^{2}). There were 897 housing units at an average density of 25.0 per square mile (9.7/km^{2}). The racial makeup of the township was 96.92% White, 0.04% African American, 0.04% Native American, 0.50% Asian, 2.20% from other races, and 0.31% from two or more races. Hispanic or Latino of any race were 3.39% of the population.

There were 869 households, out of which 42.7% had children under the age of 18 living with them, 77.7% were married couples living together, 3.5% had a female householder with no husband present, and 15.9% were non-families. 13.8% of all households were made up of individuals, and 6.3% had someone living alone who was 65 years of age or older. The average household size was 2.98 and the average family size was 3.30.

In the township the population was spread out, with 30.9% under the age of 18, 7.5% from 18 to 24, 30.8% from 25 to 44, 20.1% from 45 to 64, and 10.8% who were 65 years of age or older. The median age was 34 years. For every 100 females, there were 103.3 males. For every 100 females age 18 and over, there were 104.0 males.

The median income for a household in the township was $52,857, and the median income for a family was $56,964. Males had a median income of $39,594 versus $26,982 for females. The per capita income for the township was $18,831. About 1.5% of families and 2.3% of the population were below the poverty line, including none of those under age 18 and 15.4% of those age 65 or over.
