= Hopkins Township, Michigan =

- Township
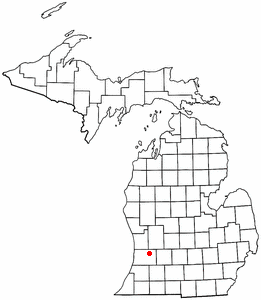
- Location of Hopkins Township
- Coordinates: 42°38′21″N 85°43′28″W
- Country: United States
- State: Michigan
- County: Allegan

Area
  - Total: 36.0 sq mi (93.3 km^{2})
  - Land: 35.7 sq mi (92.5 km^{2})
  - Water: 0.31 sq mi (0.8 km^{2})
- Elevation: 702 ft (214 m)

Population (2020)
  - Total: 2,760
  - Density: 77.3/sq mi (29.8/km^{2})
- Time zone: UTC-5 (Eastern (EST))
  - Summer (DST): UTC-4 (EDT)
- ZIP code: 49328
- Area code: 269
- FIPS code: 26-39200
- GNIS feature ID: 1626490
- Website: hopkinstownship.org

Hopkins Township is a civil township of Allegan County in the U.S. state of Michigan. The population was 2,760 at the 2020 census. The township is named after Stephen Hopkins, a signer of the Declaration of Independence.

== Communities ==
- The village of Hopkins is in the southwest of the township on Bear Creek.
- Hopkinsburg is a small unincorporated community within the township at 42°37′08″N 85°42′10″W, a few miles east of Hopkins on Miller Creek. Was first settled in 1837 by R.C. Round, whose great grandmother, Martha Hopkins Round, was the brother of Stephen Hopkins. Stephen was the namesake of the community. Was followed up by his brother-in-law, Erastus Congdon, in 1838.
- Hilliards is a small unincorporated community in the north of the township, a few miles west of Wayland at 42°40′29″N 85°43′42″W.

The city of Wayland is not within the township, but is adjacent to it in the northeast corner. Some development associated with the city extends into the township near the exit from U.S. Highway 131.

== Geography ==
According to the United States Census Bureau, the township has a total area of 36.0 square miles (93.3 km^{2}), of which 35.7 square miles (92.5 km^{2}) is land and 0.31 square miles (0.8 km^{2}), or 0.86%, is water. The Rabbit River loops through the township, flowing from the northeast corner through the center then out the northwest corner. The main tributaries in the township are Bear Creek, flowing from the southwest and Miller Creek, flowing from the southeast, both merging into the Rabbit River about one mile northeast of Hopkins. Buskirk Creek flows from the east into the Rabbit in the central part of the township. There are several small lakes in the northwest and southwest sections.

== Demographics ==
Historical population
Census	Pop.	Note	%±
1960	1,766		—
1970	2,084		18.0%
1980	2,109		1.2%
1990	2,350		11.4%
2000	2,671		13.7%
2010	2,601		−2.6%
2020	2,760		6.1%
Source: Census Bureau. Census 1960- 2000, 2010.

As of the census of 2000, there were 2,671 people, 876 households, and 692 families residing in the township. The population density was 74.5 inhabitants per square mile (28.8/km^{2}). There were 917 housing units at an average density of 25.6 per square mile (9.9/km^{2}). The racial makeup of the township was 93.00% White, 0.41% African American, 1.39% Native American, 0.52% Asian, 3.67% from other races, and 1.01% from two or more races. Hispanic or Latino of any race were 5.28% of the population.

There were 876 households, out of which 40.9% had children under the age of 18 living with them, 67.8% were married couples living together, 7.9% had a female householder with no husband present, and 21.0% were non-families. 16.8% of all households were made up of individuals, and 7.1% had someone living alone who was 65 years of age or older. The average household size was 3.00 and the average family size was 3.40.

In the township the population was spread out, with 31.7% under the age of 18, 8.2% from 18 to 24, 29.3% from 25 to 44, 21.0% from 45 to 64, and 9.8% who were 65 years of age or older. The median age was 34 years. For every 100 females, there were 104.7 males. For every 100 females age 18 and over, there were 104.6 males.

The median income for a household in the township was $46,296, and the median income for a family was $50,500. Males had a median income of $36,705 versus $23,914 for females. The per capita income for the township was $17,220. About 3.6% of families and 4.7% of the population were below the poverty line, including 1.1% of those under age 18 and 7.2% of those age 65 or over.
