= Fillmore Township, Michigan =

- Township
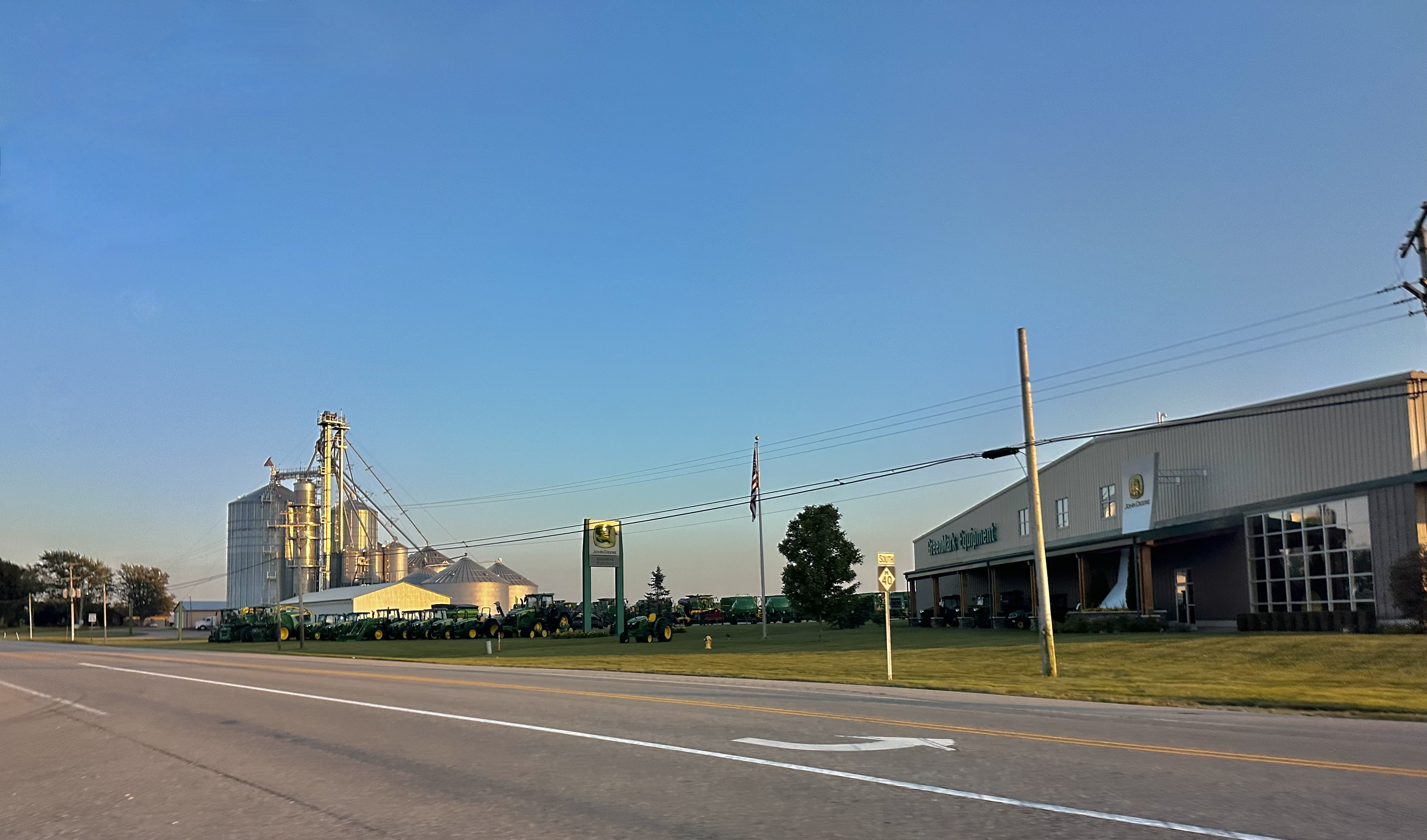
- Fillmore Township in 2023

- Location within the state of Michigan
- Coordinates: 42°43′39″N 86°4′4″W
- Country: United States
- State: Michigan
- County: Allegan

Area
  - Total: 28.4 sq mi (73.5 km^{2})
  - Land: 28.3 sq mi (73.4 km^{2})
  - Water: 0.039 sq mi (0.1 km^{2})
- Elevation: 679 ft (207 m)

Population (2020)
  - Total: 2,778
  - Density: 98/sq mi (37.9/km^{2})
- Time zone: UTC-5 (Eastern (EST))
  - Summer (DST): UTC-4 (EDT)
- FIPS code: 26-28120
- GNIS feature ID: 1626283
- Website: fillmoretownship.org

Fillmore Township is a civil township of Allegan County in the U.S. state of Michigan. The population was 2,778 at the 2020 census. It was established in 1849 by a division of Manlius Township.

The city of Holland is at the northwest corner of the township.

== Communities ==
Graafschap is a small unincorporated community, with areas in both Fillmore Township and Laketown Township. The early settlers of Graafschap, who hailed from the Netherlands, named their new community after the Dutch word for county, graafschap. Notable points of interest in the community include Graafschap Christian Reformed Church, which was erected in 1862, and the Graafschap Fire Department, which hosts an annual pancake breakfast on the Fourth of July.

East Saugatuck, an unincorporated community located in the township, is home to East Saugatuck Christian Reformed Church and East Saugatuck Community Park.

== Geography ==
According to the United States Census Bureau, the township has a total area of 28.4 square miles (73.5 km^{2}), of which 28.3 square miles (73.4 km^{2}) is land and 0.039 square miles (0.1 km^{2}), or 0.08%, is water.

== Demographics ==
Historical population
Census	Pop.	Note	%±
1960	1,877		—
1970	2,126		13.3%
1980	2,307		8.5%
1990	2,710		17.5%
2000	2,756		1.7%
2010	2,681		−2.7%
2020	2,778		3.6%
Source: Census Bureau. Census 1960- 2000, 2010.

As of the census of 2000, there were 2,756 people, 937 households, and 725 families residing in the township. The population density was 96.5 inhabitants per square mile (37.3/km^{2}). There were 977 housing units at an average density of 34.2 per square mile (13.2/km^{2}). The racial makeup of the township was 95.10% White, 0.62% African American, 0.22% Native American, 1.23% Asian, 1.78% from other races, and 1.05% from two or more races. Hispanic or Latino of any race were 4.54% of the population.

There were 937 households, out of which 40.7% had children under the age of 18 living with them, 69.7% were married couples living together, 5.1% had a female householder with no husband present, and 22.6% were non-families. 18.6% of all households were made up of individuals, and 6.2% had someone living alone who was 65 years of age or older. The average household size was 2.91 and the average family size was 3.36.

In the township the population was spread out, with 30.9% under the age of 18, 8.9% from 18 to 24, 31.2% from 25 to 44, 20.9% from 45 to 64, and 8.1% who were 65 years of age or older. The median age was 34 years. For every 100 females, there were 106.0 males. For every 100 females age 18 and over, there were 105.8 males.

The median income for a household in the township was $52,969, and the median income for a family was $61,333. Males had a median income of $40,268 versus $26,538 for females. The per capita income for the township was $20,166. About 2.9% of families and 5.4% of the population were below the poverty line, including 4.1% of those under age 18 and none of those age 65 or over.
