= Gun Plain Township, Michigan =

Charter Township of Gun Plain
- Charter township
- Location within the state of Michigan
- Coordinates: 42°28′N 85°37′W
- Country: United States
- State: Michigan
- County: Allegan

Area
  - Total: 34.4 sq mi (89.0 km^{2})
  - Land: 34.1 sq mi (88.2 km^{2})
  - Water: 0.31 sq mi (0.8 km^{2})
- Elevation: 725 ft (221 m)

Population (2020)
  - Total: 6,148
  - Density: 181/sq mi (69.7/km^{2})
- Time zone: UTC-5 (Eastern (EST))
  - Summer (DST): UTC-4 (EDT)
- FIPS code: 26-35720
- GNIS feature ID: 1626415
- Website: www.gunplain.org

Gun Plain Charter Township (T1N R11W) is a charter township of Allegan County in the U.S. state of Michigan. As of the 2020 census, the township population was 6,148.

The city of Plainwell lies within the township's survey area, but is administratively autonomous. Kalamazoo is about 12 miles (19 km) south, and Grand Rapids is about 35 miles (56 km) north.

== Communities ==
There are no villages within the township, but there are a few unincorporated communities:

- Argenta is located at Riverview Drive and 4th Street.
- Neeley is located in the northeastern corner at Marsh and Pine roads (42°30′00″N 85°33′16″W Elevation: 794 ft/242 m).

== History ==
The first Euro-American settler here was Cyrenius Thompson, who settled here in 1832. On the boundary with Barry County at 106th Avenue, Brouard Post Office opened on March 7, 1884. The Brouard Post Office was renamed Doster on March 3, 1900. The Doster Post Office was downgraded to a branch of the Plainwell Post Office on July 21, 1961. On October 28, 1978, the Doster postal branch was closed.

== Geography ==
According to the United States Census Bureau, the township has a total area of 34.4 square miles (89.0 km^{2}), of which 34.1 square miles (88.2 km^{2}) is land and 0.31 square miles (0.8 km^{2}), or 0.92%, is water.

== Demographics ==
Historical population
| Census | Pop. | Note | %± |
|---|---|---|---|
| 1960 | 2,796 | | — |
| 1970 | 3,231 | | 15.6% |
| 1980 | 4,298 | | 33.0% |
| 1990 | 4,754 | | 10.6% |
| 2000 | 5,637 | | 18.6% |
| 2010 | 5,895 | | 4.6% |
| 2020 | 6,148 | | 4.3% |
Source: Census Bureau. Census 1960- 2000, 2010.

As of the census of 2000, there were 5,637 people, 2,038 households, and 1,620 families residing in the township. The population density was 165.1 inhabitants per square mile (63.7/km^{2}). There were 2,112 housing units at an average density of 61.8 per square mile (23.9/km^{2}). The racial makeup of the township was 97.25% White, 0.35% African American, 0.34% Native American, 0.35% Asian, 0.05% Pacific Islander, 0.39% from other races, and 1.26% from two or more races. Hispanic or Latino of any race were 1.08% of the population.

There were 2,038 households, out of which 38.4% had children under the age of 18 living with them, 67.7% were married couples living together, 8.1% had a female householder with no husband present, and 20.5% were non-families. 15.4% of all households were made up of individuals, and 5.4% had someone living alone who was 65 years of age or older. The average household size was 2.76 and the average family size was 3.06.

In the township the population was spread out, with 28.0% under the age of 18, 6.4% from 18 to 24, 29.9% from 25 to 44, 26.2% from 45 to 64, and 9.4% who were 65 years of age or older. The median age was 37 years. For every 100 females, there were 100.2 males. For every 100 females age 18 and over, there were 98.3 males.

The median income for a household in the township was $53,495, and the median income for a family was $58,921. Males had a median income of $45,176 versus $28,969 for females. The per capita income for the township was $22,941. About 5.4% of families and 7.8% of the population were below the poverty line, including 7.5% of those under age 18 and 6.7% of those age 65 or over.
