= Otsego Township, Michigan =

- Township
- Location within the state of Michigan
- Coordinates: 42°27′45″N 85°43′05″W
- Country: United States
- State: Michigan
- County: Allegan

Area
  - Total: 33.9 sq mi (87.7 km^{2})
  - Land: 33.2 sq mi (86.1 km^{2})
  - Water: 0.62 sq mi (1.6 km^{2})
- Elevation: 682 ft (208 m)

Population (2020)
  - Total: 5,903
  - Density: 178/sq mi (68.6/km^{2})
- Time zone: UTC-5 (Eastern (EST))
  - Summer (DST): UTC-4 (EDT)
- FIPS code: 26-61640
- GNIS feature ID: 1626869
- Website: www.otsegotownship.org

Otsego Township is a civil township of Allegan County in the U.S. state of Michigan. The population was 5,903 at the 2020 census. The city of Otsego is located within the township, but is administratively autonomous.

== Geography ==
According to the United States Census Bureau, the township has a total area of 33.9 square miles (87.7 km^{2}), of which 33.2 square miles (86.1 km^{2}) is land and 0.62 square miles (1.6 km^{2}), or 1.86%, is water.

== Demographics ==
As of the census of 2000, there were 4,854 people, 1,771 households, and 1,390 families residing in the township. The population density was 145.8 inhabitants per square mile (56.3/km^{2}). There were 1,859 housing units at an average density of 55.8 per square mile (21.5/km^{2}). The racial makeup of the township was 97.20% White, 0.35% African American, 0.31% Native American, 0.54% Asian, 0.04% Pacific Islander, 0.29% from other races, and 1.28% from two or more races. Hispanic or Latino of any race were 1.48% of the population.

There were 1,771 households, out of which 38.0% had children under the age of 18 living with them, 64.9% were married couples living together, 9.1% had a female householder with no husband present, and 21.5% were non-families. 17.3% of all households were made up of individuals, and 7.3% had someone living alone who was 65 years of age or older. The average household size was 2.73 and the average family size was 3.06.

In the township the population was spread out, with 27.6% under the age of 18, 7.3% from 18 to 24, 28.8% from 25 to 44, 26.1% from 45 to 64, and 10.2% who were 65 years of age or older. The median age was 38 years. For every 100 females, there were 101.7 males. For every 100 females age 18 and over, there were 98.0 males.

The median income for a household in the township was $48,654, and the median income for a family was $54,917. Males had a median income of $39,619 versus $29,750 for females. The per capita income for the township was $20,546. About 3.6% of families and 4.6% of the population were below the poverty line, including 3.4% of those under age 18 and 3.4% of those age 65 or over.

== History ==
The Pine Creek settlement known also as New Rochester was a community located at 42° 27' 24.30" N, 85° 43' 59.64" W near the junction of Pine Creek and the Kalamazoo river in Otsego Township, Allegan County, Michigan. It was approximately two miles west of the present day city of Otsego. The site was first explored in 1829 by Giles Scott and the Sherwoods of Rochester, New York, Samuel Foster from Vermont, and Turner Aldrich Jr. of Cattaraugus County, New York, while searching for pine tracts and a location to construct a mill site. Giles Scott, the son-in-law of Hull Sherwood returned to the mouth of the Pine Creek with his wife and small children in 1830 and constructed a small log cabin in 1831. Shortly following Scott, Turner Aldrich Jr., arrived in Pine Creek. Aldrich built a water powered saw mill located on Pine Creek, one mile from its mouth in 1831. The mill constructed by Aldrich is believed to have cut the first lumber in Western Michigan. The mill burned down shortly after construction but was rebuilt by Aldrich in 1832. Hull Sherwood settled in Pine Creek in 1831. With the aid of Scott a dam and saw-mill were constructed at the mouth of the creek. The saw mill was completed in the winter of 1831–32. Soon followed by the construction of a grist mill in 1834. Lands were held by settlers through pre-emption until they were placed on the market by the government, at which time settlers were required to report to the nearest land office to pay for their land.

Hull Sherwood platted the village named New Rochester at Pine Creek, which remained a prominent settlement through the 1830s. In 1833 the first school was taught by Dr. Lintsford B. Coates just to the east of Pine Creek. A bridge crossing the Kalamazoo River was constructed at Pine Creek in 1835. In the same year the Higgins saw mill began operation at Pine Creek. In 1836, Giles Scott, who was known as an excellent fiddler constructed the tavern known as Pine Creek House over which he presided until his death in 1840. The decline of New Rochester began following severe economic conditions resulting from the panic of 1837, but some economic activity continued in the Pine Creek area. In 1850 another saw mill was constructed two miles south of the Pine Creek settlement, known as Leighton's Saw Mill. A cider mill opened at Pine Creek in 1869. In 1880, an iron bridge with two spans and one pier was built over the Pine Creek. The following year the Pine Creek Grange Hall was completed. The building is still in use, after being moved to its present location east of the Pine River in 1903. Herman Jungnitsch open a blacksmith shop at Pine Creek in 1885. Wash Morter also operated a blacksmith shop at Pine Creek, the original building was relocated to its present location east of the Pine Creek on top of a hill. A post office was established in 1899 under the name Dent because a Pine Creek office already existed and was operated by Miss Mae Carroll. In 1903, the construction of the Pine Creek Dam of the Commonwealth, later known as Consumers Power Company, was completed and after the buildings of the small settlement near the Pine Creek known as New Rochester were either moved or torn down, the area was flooded.
