= Clyde Township, Allegan County, Michigan =

Clyde Township, Michigan
- Township
- Location within the state of Michigan
- Coordinates: 42°33′26″N 86°4′44″W
- Country: United States
- State: Michigan
- County: Allegan

Area
  - Total: 35.5 sq mi (91.9 km^{2})
  - Land: 34.8 sq mi (90.1 km^{2})
  - Water: 0.69 sq mi (1.8 km^{2})
- Elevation: 646 ft (197 m)

Population (2020)
  - Total: 2,060
  - Density: 59.2/sq mi (22.9/km^{2})
- Time zone: UTC-5 (Eastern (EST))
  - Summer (DST): UTC-4 (EDT)
- FIPS code: 26-16720
- GNIS feature ID: 1626103
- Website: https://www.clydetwp.com/

Clyde Township is a civil township of Allegan County in the U.S. state of Michigan. The population was 2,060 at the 2020 census.

== History ==
Clyde Township was established in 1859.

== Communities ==
Bravo began around a sawmill started by Ezra L. Davis and Alonzo Sherman in 1867.

Clyde Centre began around a sawmill in 1872. It had a post office from 1873 to 1877. After that the sawmill closed and the area was used for farming and lost its identity as a place.

Pearl is an unincorporated community at 42°32′31″N 86°05′34″W. The community began with a sawmill built by Eggleston & Hazleton in 1875, and was first known as Clyde Center from its location near the center of Clyde Township. It was renamed for Simeon O. Pearl in 1881, and a post office was established named Pearl on April 15, 1881, with George H. Smith as the first postmaster. It was also a station on the Chicago and West Michigan Railway.

== Geography ==
According to the United States Census Bureau, the township has a total area of 35.5 square miles (91.9 km^{2}), of which 34.8 square miles (90.1 km^{2}) is land and 0.69 square miles (1.8 km^{2}), or 1.92%, is water.

== Demographics ==
Historical population
Census	Pop.	Note	%±
1960	1,575		—
1970	1,575		0.0%
1980	2,099		33.3%
1990	2,001		−4.7%
2000	2,104		5.1%
2010	2,084		−1.0%
2020	2,060		−1.2%
Source: Census Bureau. Census 1960- 2000, 2010.

As of the census of 2000, there were 2,104 people, 708 households, and 550 families residing in the township. The population density was 60.2 inhabitants per square mile (23.2/km^{2}). There were 840 housing units at an average density of 24.0 per square mile (9.3/km^{2}). The racial makeup of the township was 78.61% White, 1.66% African American, 0.38% Native American, 0.57% Asian, 16.35% from other races, and 2.42% from two or more races. Hispanic or Latino of any race were 29.66% of the population.

There were 708 households, out of which 37.1% had children under the age of 18 living with them, 63.1% were married couples living together, 9.2% had a female householder with no husband present, and 22.3% were non-families. 17.7% of all households were made up of individuals, and 6.4% had someone living alone who was 65 years of age or older. The average household size was 2.97 and the average family size was 3.33.

In the township the population was spread out, with 30.2% under the age of 18, 8.7% from 18 to 24, 30.7% from 25 to 44, 22.0% from 45 to 64, and 8.4% who were 65 years of age or older. The median age was 34 years. For every 100 females, there were 101.5 males. For every 100 females age 18 and over, there were 100.1 males.

The median income for a household in the township was $42,717, and the median income for a family was $46,806. Males had a median income of $31,549 versus $26,188 for females. The per capita income for the township was $15,986. About 7.4% of families and 9.5% of the population were below the poverty line, including 13.8% of those under age 18 and 7.1% of those age 65 or over.
