= Allegan Township, Michigan =

- Township
- Location within the state of Michigan
- Coordinates: 42°32′48″N 85°50′38″W
- Country: United States
- State: Michigan
- County: Allegan

Area
  - Total: 31.9 sq mi (82.6 km^{2})
  - Land: 30.4 sq mi (78.7 km^{2})
  - Water: 1.5 sq mi (3.8 km^{2})
- Elevation: 748 ft (228 m)

Population (2020)
  - Total: 4,689
  - Density: 154/sq mi (59.6/km^{2})
- Time zone: UTC-5 (Eastern (EST))
  - Summer (DST): UTC-4 (EDT)
- ZIP code: 49010
- Area code: 269
- FIPS code: 26-01280
- GNIS feature ID: 1625820
- Website: www.allegantownship.org

Allegan Township is a civil township of Allegan County in the U.S. state of Michigan. As of the 2020 census, the population was 4,689.

The city of Allegan is within the township, but is administratively autonomous.

== Geography ==
According to the United States Census Bureau, the township has a total area of 31.9 square miles (82.6 km^{2}), of which 30.4 square miles (78.7 km^{2}) is land and 1.5 square miles (3.8 km^{2}), or 4.63%, is water.

== Demographics ==
Historical population
Census	Pop.	Note	%±
1960	2,404		—
1970	2,970		23.5%
1980	3,464		16.6%
1990	3,976		14.8%
2000	4,050		1.9%
2010	4,406		8.8%
2020	4,689		6.4%
Source: Census Bureau. Census 1960- 2000, 2010.

As of the census of 2000, there were 4,050 people, 1,574 households, and 1,156 families residing in the township. The population density was 133.1 inhabitants per square mile (51.4/km^{2}). There were 1,780 housing units at an average density of 58.5 per square mile (22.6/km^{2}). The racial makeup of the township was 97.04% White, 0.52% African American, 0.30% Native American, 0.27% Asian, 0.62% from other races, and 1.26% from two or more races. Hispanic or Latino of any race were 1.65% of the population.

There were 1,574 households, out of which 32.5% had children under the age of 18 living with them, 60.5% were married couples living together, 9.1% had a female householder with no husband present, and 26.5% were non-families. 22.1% of all households were made up of individuals, and 9.7% had someone living alone who was 65 years of age or older. The average household size was 2.55 and the average family size was 2.96.

In the township the population was spread out, with 25.9% under the age of 18, 7.1% from 18 to 24, 26.9% from 25 to 44, 26.0% from 45 to 64, and 14.1% who were 65 years of age or older. The median age was 39 years. For every 100 females, there were 94.0 males. For every 100 females age 18 and over, there were 93.2 males.

The median income for a household in the township was $40,760, and the median income for a family was $48,125. Males had a median income of $37,383 versus $29,716 for females. The per capita income for the township was $18,545. About 4.8% of families and 8.1% of the population were below the poverty line, including 8.2% of those under age 18 and 10.6% of those age 65 or over.
