= Cheshire Township, Michigan =

- Township
- Location within the state of Michigan
- Coordinates: 42°27′28″N 85°57′18″W
- Country: United States
- State: Michigan
- County: Allegan

Area
  - Total: 35.9 sq mi (93.0 km^{2})
  - Land: 34.8 sq mi (90.2 km^{2})
  - Water: 1.1 sq mi (2.8 km^{2})
- Elevation: 690 ft (210 m)

Population (2020)
  - Total: 2,211
  - Density: 63.5/sq mi (24.5/km^{2})
- Time zone: UTC-5 (Eastern (EST))
  - Summer (DST): UTC-4 (EDT)
- FIPS code: 26-15200
- GNIS feature ID: 1626070
- Website: cheshiretownshipmi.gov

Cheshire Township is a civil township of Allegan County in the U.S. state of Michigan. The population was 2,211 at the 2020 census.

== Communities ==
Cheshire Center or Cheshire is an unincorporated community at 42°27′06″N 85°56′04″W. The first permanent white settler was Simeon Pike from Monroe County, New York, who arrived in 1839. Cheshire Township was organized in 1851, and the sawmill village was named for the township. A post office named Cheshire was established on March 8, 1856, with Jonathon Howard as the first postmaster. The name of the office was "Lake" from April 10, 1858, until February 18, 1863, when it reverted to Cheshire. The office closed on March 6, 1879, and reopened from June 20, 1879, until July 30, 1905.

Chicora is an unincorporated community at 42°28′36″N 85°58′25″W. A post office was opened on January 10, 1896, with Herman D. Clark as the first postmaster, and operated until May 31, 1904. It is named after the S.S. Chicora, a steamship that sank in Lake Michigan on January 21, 1895.

== Geography ==
According to the United States Census Bureau, the township has a total area of 35.9 square miles (93.0 km^{2}), of which 34.8 square miles (90.2 km^{2}) is land and 1.1 square miles (2.8 km^{2}), or 3.05%, is water.

== Demographics ==
Historical population
Census	Pop.	Note	%±
1960	1,034		—
1970	1,322		27.9%
1980	1,797		35.9%
1990	1,967		9.5%
2000	2,335		18.7%
2010	2,199		−5.8%
2020	2,211		0.5%
Source: Census Bureau. Census 1960- 2000, 2010.

As of the census of 2000, there were 2,335 people, 857 households, and 646 families residing in the township. The population density was 66.8 inhabitants per square mile (25.8/km^{2}). here were 1,137 housing units at an average density of 32.5 per square mile (12.5/km^{2}). The racial makeup of the township was 92.25% White, 3.38% African American, 0.60% Native American, 0.13% Asian, 0.26% Pacific Islander, 0.99% from other races, and 2.40% from two or more races. Hispanic or Latino of any race were 2.61% of the population.

There were 857 households, out of which 37.0% had children under the age of 18 living with them, 59.5% were married couples living together, 10.2% had a female householder with no husband present, and 24.6% were non-families. 18.6% of all households were made up of individuals, and 7.1% had someone living alone who was 65 years of age or older. The average household size was 2.72 and the average family size was 3.09.

In the township the population was spread out, with 28.9% under the age of 18, 6.9% from 18 to 24, 31.0% from 25 to 44, 23.2% from 45 to 64, and 10.1% who were 65 years of age or older. The median age was 36 years. For every 100 females, there were 99.7 males. For every 100 females age 18 and over, there were 99.4 males.

The median income for a household in the township was $40,405, and the median income for a family was $46,250. Males had a median income of $38,750 versus $25,993 for females. The per capita income for the township was $16,350. About 4.7% of families and 9.4% of the population were below the poverty line, including 6.3% of those under age 18 and 16.9% of those age 65 or over.
