= Padgham Field =

Padgham Field Allegan City Airport
- IATA: none; ICAO: K35D; FAA LID: 35D

Summary
- Airport type: Public
- Operator: City of Allegan
- Location: Allegan, Michigan
- Elevation AMSL: 891 ft / 272 m
- Coordinates: 42°31′51.5″N 85°49′30.5″W

Map
- Location of airport in Michigan 35D (the United States)

Runways
Direction	Length		Surface
Direction	ft	m	Surface
11/29	4,300'x75'	1,311x23	Asphalt
15/33	1,598'x150'	487x46	Turf

Statistics (2020)
- Aircraft Movements: 10,220
- Based Aircraft: 28

Allegan City Airport (Padgham Field) (ICAO: K35D, FAA LID: 35D) is a general aviation airport located 1 mile (2 km) east of Allegan in Allegan County, Michigan, United States.

It is included in the Federal Aviation Administration (FAA) National Plan of Integrated Airport Systems for 2017–2021, in which it is categorized as a local general aviation facility.

The airport offers skydiving, public telephone, weather briefings, and 100LL fuel servicing. It hosts significant flight training operations.

== Facilities and aircraft ==
The airport is staffed daily from 8am until dusk. The airport is accessible by road from M-222 (exit 55 off US 131), and is located near M-40 and M-89.

The airport has two runways. Runway 11/29 is 4300 x 75 ft (1311 x 23 m) and is made of asphalt. Runway 15/33 9s 1830 x 150 ft (558 x 46 m) and is made of turf.

For the 12-month period ending December 31, 2020, the airport has 10,220 aircraft operations, an average of 28 per day. This includes 100% general aviation and 1% air taxi. For the same time period, there are 28 aircraft based on the field: 27 single-engine airplanes and 1 multi-engine airplane.

The airport has a fixed-base operator offering fuel, general maintenance, courtesy transportation, conference rooms, a crew lounge, snooze rooms, and more.

In 2013, the airport approved an investment to add 12 new hangars at the airport and upgrade its apron, bringing the total number of hangars to 34. The project was largely funded by the Michigan Department of Transportation.

=== Airport communications ===
- CTAF/UNICOM: 122.8
- GREAT LAKES APPROACH: 128.4
- GREAT LAKES DEPARTURE: 128.4
- WX ASOS at BIV (18 nm NW): 119.025 (616-394-0190)

== Skydiving ==
Padgham Field has active skydiving operations at the field. There is a small skydiving club operating on Saturdays and a commercial operation, Skydive Inc., that operates as Skydive Allegan and jumps on Saturdays, Sundays, Wednesday evenings, and throughout the week on occasion. These operations typically put skydivers over the north center of the field and land in the field area between the T-hangars.

Experienced skydivers normally exit the aircraft from an altitude of 10,000' AGL and freefall to approximately 2,500' AGL before deploying their canopies. Skydive Inc.'s Skydive Allegan Tandem Skydivers normally exit the aircraft from an altitude of 10,000' AGL and freefall to approximately 4,500' AGL before deploying their canopies. During skydiving operations, Padgham Field potentially has skydiving canopy traffic in a small pattern from 4,500' AGL to the ground.

Skydive aircraft are in constant communication with Grand Rapids Approach and give notices via local frequencies as to skydiver jump status.

== See also ==
- List of airports in Michigan
