= M-222 (Michigan highway) =

State highway in Allegan County, Michigan, United States

M-222
- M-222 highlighted in red

Route information
- Maintained by MDOT
- Length: 10.247 mi (16.491 km)
- Existed: 1988–present

Major junctions
- West end: M-40 / M-89 in Allegan
- East end: US 131 near Martin

Location
- Country: United States
- State: Michigan
- Counties: Allegan

Highway system
- Michigan State Trunkline Highway System; Interstate; US; State; Byways
← M-221	→ US 223
← M-117	M-118	→ M-119

M-222 is the current designation of a state trunkline highway in Allegan County of the US state of Michigan. It runs between the city of Allegan, where it connects with M-40/M-89, and the US Highway 131 (US 131) freeway near Martin. The highway runs along a series of streets in Allegan and through rural farm fields and woods between the two communities along 116th Avenue. The roadway was a state highway back in 1919 when the system was initially signed. It was assigned as part of M-89 and M-40 before being given its own number, M-118. That designation was applied to the highway until 1988 when that was retired in favor of the current M-222.

== Route description ==
M-222 begins at an intersection with M-40/M-89 in the town of Allegan at the corner of Cutler and Cedar streets. From there, the trunkline runs northward on Cedar Street for a block before turning eastward on Monroe Street. Then the highway proceeds through residential areas along Monroe and turns onto Grand Street to cross over the Kalamazoo River. M-222 intersects A-37 (Main Street) and runs next to Padgham Field before exiting town. From there, the highway continues on due eastward as 116th Avenue through rural areas and agricultural fields. Further east, the fields are taken over by forested area and residential subdivisions in places near Watson. The trunkline jogs to the south to bisect Wetheral Lake. M-222 ends north of US 131 Motorsports Park near exit 55 on US 131 east of Martin.

Like other state highways in Michigan, M-222 is maintained by the Michigan Department of Transportation (MDOT). In 2011, the department's traffic surveys showed that on average, 9,147 vehicles used the highway daily in Allegan between M-40/M-89 and A-37 and 5,470 vehicles did so each day between near the eastern terminus, the highest and lowest counts along the highway, respectively. No section of M-222 is listed on the National Highway System, a network of roads important to the country's economy, defense, and mobility.

== History ==
When the state highway system was initially signposted in 1919, the highway between Allegan and Martin was part of M-89. In 1926, when M-40 was extended from Allegan to Martin, M-89 was rerouted out of Allegan to the southeast along its present-day alignment to terminate at US 131 in Plainwell.

M-118
- Location: Allegan–Martin
- Length: 10.247 mi (16.491 km)
- Existed: 1929–1988

In 1929, the routing from Allegan to Martin was removed and renumbered M-118, and M-40 was extended to the north out of Allegan along M-89 and its modern routing to a new terminus in Holland ending at US 31. By the middle of 1960, the US 131 was opened as far south as Martin; the section of M-118 between the new freeway and the old routing was used as a connector until the next section south to Plainwell opened the next year. After this next freeway segment was opened, M-118 was truncated to end at the freeway.

In 1988, the M-118 designation was decommissioned and the highway was renumbered M-222 to prevent confusion with 118th Avenue which runs parallel to the route about one mile (1.6 km) to the north for most of the length.

== Major intersections ==
The entire highway is in Allegan County.

Location	mi	km	Destinations	Notes
Allegan	0.000	0.000	M-40 / M-89 – Holland, Paw Paw	
Allegan	0.662	1.065	A-37 north – Hudsonville	Southern terminus of A-37
Martin Township	10.247	16.491	US 131 – Grand Rapids, Kalamazoo	Exit 55 on US 131
1.000 mi = 1.609 km; 1.000 km = 0.621 mi
