= U.S. Route 131 =

US Highway in Indiana and Michigan

U.S. Route 131
- US 131 highlighted in red

Route information
- Auxiliary route of US 31
- Maintained by INDOT and MDOT
- Length: 269.956 mi (Note: Total mileage is a summation of the state mileages.) (434.452 km)
- Existed: November 11, 1926–present

Major junctions
- South end: I-80 / I-90 / Indiana Toll Road / SR 13 near Middlebury, Indiana
- US 12 near White Pigeon, Michigan; I-94 in Portage, Michigan; M-6 in Wyoming, Michigan; I-196 in Grand Rapids, Michigan; I-96 / M-37 in Walker, Michigan; US 10 near Reed City, Michigan; M-55 / M-115 in Cadillac, Michigan; M-66 / M-72 in Kalkaska, Michigan
- North end: US 31 in Petoskey, Michigan

Location
- Country: United States
- States: Indiana, Michigan
- Counties: Indiana Elkhart; Michigan St. Joseph, Kalamazoo, Allegan, Kent, Montcalm, Mecosta, Osceola, Wexford, Grand Traverse, Kalkaska, Antrim, Charlevoix, Emmet

Highway system
- United States Numbered Highway System; List; Special; Divided
- Indiana State Highway System; Interstate; US; State; Scenic
- Michigan State Trunkline Highway System; Interstate; US; State; Byways
← SR 130	Indiana	→ SR 134
← M-130	Michigan	→ Bus. US 131

US Highway 131 (US 131) is a north–south United States Numbered Highway, of which all but 0.64 of its 269.96 miles (1.03 of 434.46 km) are within the state of Michigan. The highway starts in rural Indiana south of the state line as a state road connection to the Indiana Toll Road. As the road crosses into Michigan it becomes a state trunkline highway that connects to the metropolitan areas of Kalamazoo and Grand Rapids before continuing north to its terminus at Petoskey. US 131 runs as a freeway from south of Portage through to Manton in the north. Part of this freeway runs concurrently with Interstate 296 (I-296) as an unsigned designation through Grand Rapids. US 131 forms an important corridor along the western side of the Lower Peninsula of Michigan, running through rural farm and forest lands as well as urban cityscapes. Various names have been applied to the roadway over the years. The oldest, the Mackinaw Trail, originated from an Indian trail in the area while other names honored politicians. An attempt to dedicate the highway to poet James Whitcomb Riley failed to gain official support in Michigan.

The first state highways along the US 131 corridor were designated as early as 1919. When the US Highway System was formed on November 11, 1926, US 131 was created along the route of M-13 in Michigan. Originally ending at Fife Lake on the north end, the highway was extended to Petoskey in the late 1930s. Further changes were made, starting in the 1950s, to convert segments of the road to a full freeway. The state started this conversion simultaneously at two locations: heading north from Three Rivers, and heading both north and south from a point in southern Kent County. A third segment was built south of Cadillac and over subsequent years Michigan filled the gaps in the freeway. Cadillac and Manton were bypassed in the early part of the 21st century, resulting in the current freeway configuration. Another large-scale construction project in 2000 rebuilt an unusual section of the freeway through Grand Rapids known as the S-Curve. Two bridges formerly used by US 131 have been labeled by the Michigan Department of Transportation (MDOT) as historic structures; one of them has been listed on the National Register of Historic Places (NRHP).

Plans to further extend the freeway have either been canceled or placed back under study. Upgrades on the north end through Kalkaska ceased to be considered in 2000. South of Three Rivers, MDOT is studying possible upgrades to US 131. One option for these upgrades is a full freeway, an option that was initially rejected. The preferred alternative in 2008 was a two-lane bypass of Constantine that opened in October 2013.

== Route description ==
Running 269.96 miles (434.46 km) in Indiana and Michigan, US 131 in its entirety is listed as a part of the National Highway System. As a state highway in both states, the roadway is maintained by the Indiana Department of Transportation (INDOT) and MDOT. The Michigan section includes approximately 172 miles (277 km) of freeway between Kalamazoo and Wexford counties.

=== Indiana ===
US 131 extends 0.643 miles (1.035 km) through Elkhart County, Indiana, between the entrance to the Indiana Toll Road, a few hundred feet north of the Toll Road overpass, and the state line to the north. State Road 13 (SR 13) runs concurrently with US 131 in this section but is not signposted. INDOT surveys the roads under its control on a regular basis to measure the amount of traffic using the state's highways. These traffic counts are expressed in terms of annual average daily traffic (AADT), a calculation of the average daily number of vehicles on a segment of roadway. The 2007 survey reported average daily traffic of 7,949 cars and 2,068 trucks.

=== Southwest Michigan ===
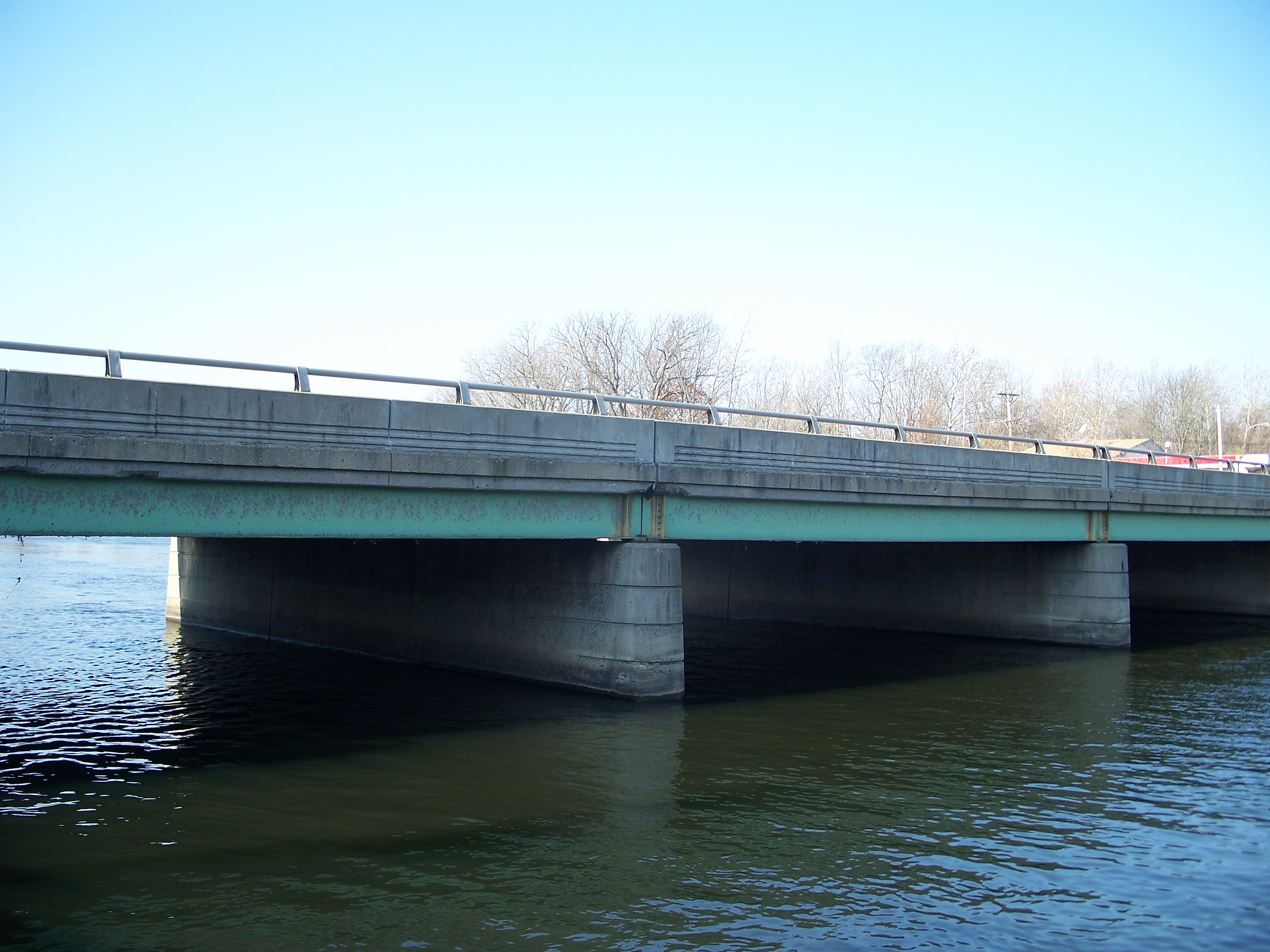
Bridge on the former route over the St. Joseph River in Constantine

As a state trunkline highway, US 131 runs approximately 266 miles (428 km) in Michigan, from the Indiana state line north to Petoskey. The highway is an important link between Grand Rapids and the tourist areas of Northern Michigan. The trunkline enters Michigan about three miles (4.8 km) south of White Pigeon, crossing a branch of the Michigan Southern Railroad before meeting US 12 on the west side of the village. The highway passes through rural farmland north to just south of Constantine, where US 131 turns northwestward to bypass the downtown business district, crosses the St. Joseph River and continues north to Three Rivers. The stretch of highway between Constantine and the start of the divided highway south of Three Rivers averaged 7,579 cars and 1,045 trucks daily in 2009 according to MDOT, one of the lowest AADT counts for the highway in Michigan.

US 131 runs through a business corridor along the west side of Three Rivers. M-60 runs concurrently along this part of US 131 until the two highways meet the south end of the business loop through town. The main road curves to the northeast as it leaves town, and M-60 turns east to follow Business US 131 (Bus. US 131) into downtown. The trunkline runs parallel to a branch of the Grand Elk Railroad. North of the other end of the business loop, US 131 follows a four-lane surface highway through rural farmland in northern St. Joseph County. The highway has at-grade junctions with cross roads, but otherwise has limited access from adjoining property. This arrangement ends on the south side of Schoolcraft, where the highway transitions to follow Grand Street through town. North of town US 131 returns to an expressway as the highway continues through southern Kalamazoo County farmland.

After an intersection with Shaver Road, US 131 widens into a full freeway which passes the Gourdneck State Game Area as it enters the Kalamazoo metropolitan area. US 131 meets I-94 southwest of Kalamazoo. Further north, the freeway crosses the Stadium Drive interchange, which connects downtown Kalamazoo near the main campuses of Western Michigan University and Kalamazoo College. At the next exit, US 131 picks up M-43 as the latter highway runs concurrently northward. As the freeway passes the west side of Kalamazoo the environs change to a more forested and semi-residential area. US 131 passes the northern end of Bus. US 131. North of this interchange the freeway crosses into eastern Allegan County.

=== West Michigan ===
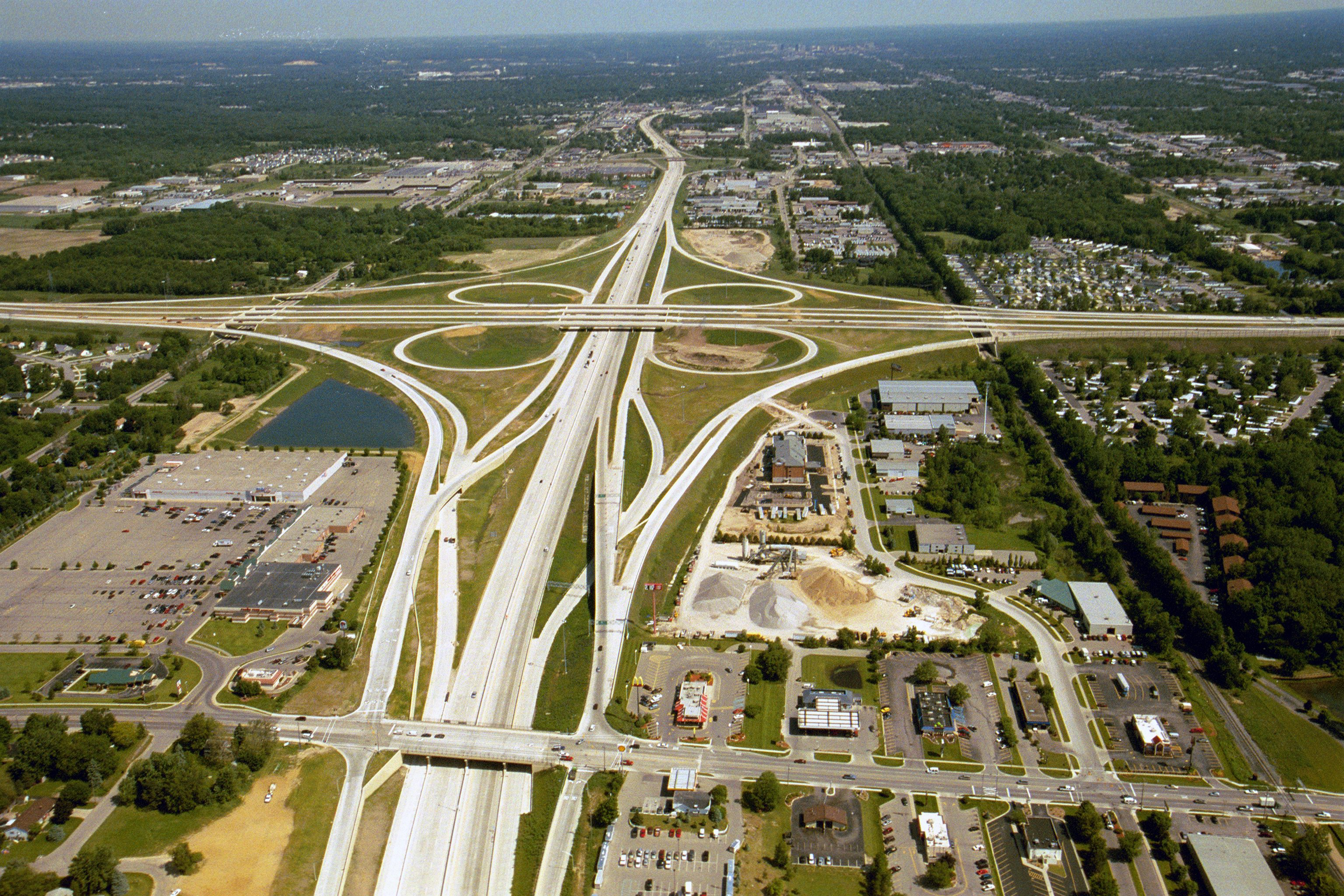
Cloverleaf interchange for US 131/M-6/68th Street in Wyoming

As US 131 passes through the outskirts of Plainwell, it curves to the northeast through a commercial area centered around the interchange with M-89; M-43 departs the freeway at this exit. North of this area US 131 crosses the Kalamazoo River and runs past the US 131 Raceway Park, a dragstrip close to the M-222 interchange near Martin. The freeway continues north through mixed farm and forest land to the residential areas that abut it in Wayland. Farther north the highway crosses into Kent County and the southern end of the Grand Rapids metropolitan area.

As the freeway continues, and closer to Grand Rapids, it is lined with more commercial and light industrial properties. The unincorporated suburb of Cutlerville lies to the east as US 131 approaches M-6, the South Beltline Freeway, and meets in the largest freeway interchange in West Michigan. Gaining a third lane in each direction, the interchange stretches over a half mile (0.8 km) in width and over a mile (1.6 km) in length (Note: As measured by mainline freeway lane lengths.) and encompasses 27 bridges and 18 retaining walls. US 131 continues north through the city of Wyoming to the more suburban residential areas near the southern city limits of Grand Rapids north of M-11 (28th Street).

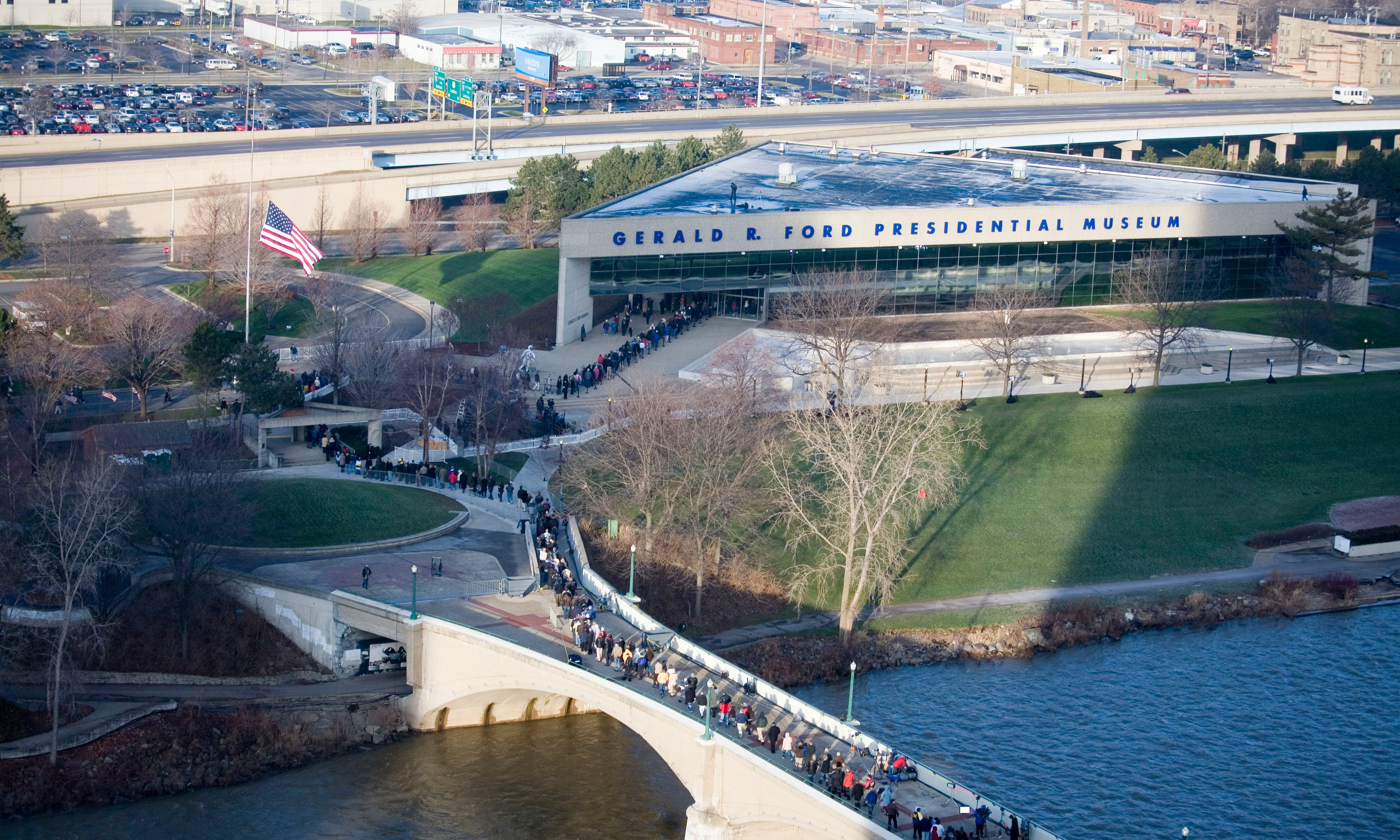
The Gerald R. Ford Museum, next to US 131, on the day of the former president's interment

The freeway continues through the southern end of Grand Rapids, alongside residential areas until Burton Street. A large rail yard abuts the trunkline on the east, and the freeway turns northeasterly on its approach to downtown. At Wealthy Street, the freeway takes a sharp turn to the west to cross the Grand River and immediately turns back north on a bridge structure known as the S-Curve. The highest traffic volumes along US 131 are located north of this river crossing. In 2009, MDOT measured an AADT of 107,200 cars and 5,992 trucks through the stretch between Market Avenue and Pearl Street. The trunkline continues past the Gerald R. Ford Museum and the Public Museum of Grand Rapids before the northbound carriageway crosses over, then back under, the southbound lanes, forcing traffic through this stretch to briefly drive on the left. North of I-196, US 131 picks up a second, hidden designation on highway inventory logs called I-296, although the number is not signposted along the road. I-296/US 131 continues along the banks of the Grand River into Walker where the hidden I-296 designation turns to the northwest along a series of ramps to I-96 while US 131 curves to the northeast along a bend in the river. As it continues along the river the freeway passes through the unincorporated community of Comstock Park and near to LMCU Ballpark, home of the West Michigan Whitecaps local minor league baseball team.

The trunkline turns north, away from the river, as it nears the stadium and passes through the remainder of the northern suburbs, changing to a more rural character as the freeway passes through the northern end of Kent County. M-46 joins US 131 from the west at Cedar Springs, and the two highways pass into northwestern Montcalm County near Sand Lake. North of Pierson the landscape is dominated by forests. M-46 turns east and leaves the freeway near Howard City while US 131 continues into Mecosta County near the Little Muskegon River. The freeway forms the eastern boundary of the Manistee National Forest near the river and north to Big Rapids. Further north M-20 joins the US 131 freeway near Stanwood, and the two highways cross the Muskegon River on the way to Big Rapids. The city is served by its own business loop, and M-20 turns east off the freeway along Bus. US 131 toward the main campus of Ferris State University. North of Big Rapids US 131 runs through rural Osceola County to a junction with US 10 at Reed City.

=== Northern Michigan ===
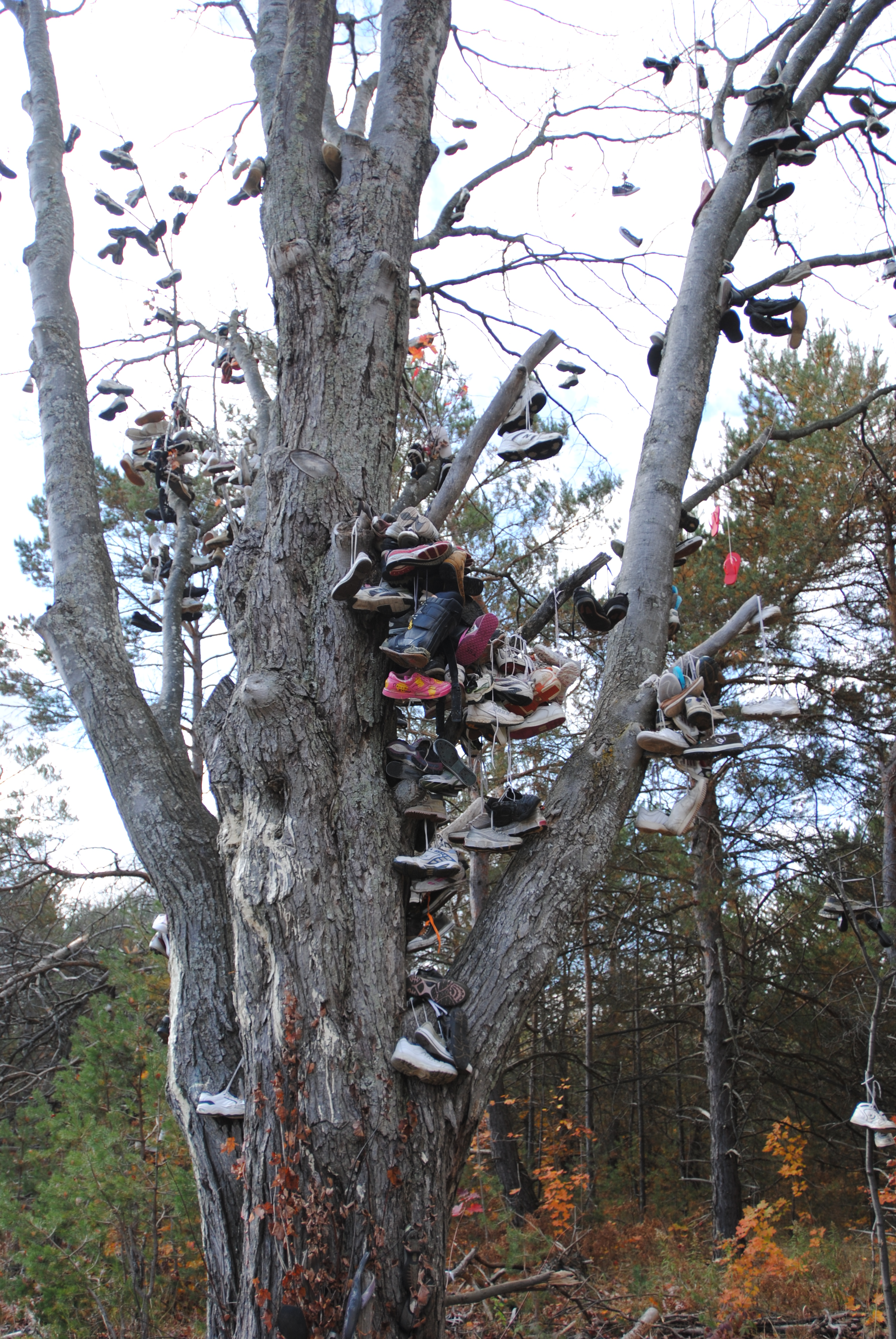
The Shoe Tree north of Kalkaska on the west side of the highway

Passing through rural Osceola County and providing access to rural communities such as Le Roy and Tustin, US 131 approaches the south side of Cadillac in Wexford County. At exit 176, M-55 leaves a concurrency with M-115 and joins the US 131 freeway around the east side of Cadillac. This bypass was built in the early 21st century and the old routing is now a business loop through downtown. M-55 follows the freeway to exit 180 while US 131 continues around the east side of Cadillac and north around the east side of Manton. The lowest freeway traffic counts along US 131, 7,455 cars and 709 trucks in 2009, are on the northeast side of Manton, as the trunkline transitions back to a two-lane undivided highway before meeting the north end of Manton's business loop.

The two-lane highway runs through the Pere Marquette State Forest and over the Manistee River, crossing the southeast corner of Grand Traverse County. It meets the southern end of M-113 in Walton, where it runs parallel to the Great Lakes Central Railroad. Passing through Fife Lake, US 131 crosses into Kalkaska County and to South Boardman. The area around South Boardman is marked by farmland as the trunkline crosses the Boardman River in the small unincorporated community. The road once again runs parallel to the railroad as it meets M-66/M-72 south of Kalkaska. The three highways join and run concurrently through downtown. North of town M-72 turns west toward Traverse City and US 131/M-66 continues north through farmland into Antrim County. About 3–3.5 miles (4.8–5.6 km) north of town, standing on the west side of the road, was the Shoe Tree. A local icon since shortly after the turn of the 21st century, the origins of the landmark are unknown. MDOT crews trimmed the tree and removed the shoes in 2024 calling the landmark a safety hazard.

The trunkline follows the railroad into Antrim and Mancelona. North of downtown Mancelona, M-66 turns north toward Charlevoix and US 131 continues along the Mackinaw Trail through Alba. M-32 follows US 131 for a half mile (0.8 km) near the community of Elmira. As it continues farther north, US 131 enters the Mackinaw State Forest. Here, MDOT has calculated the lowest average daily traffic counts of all on US 131: 5,114 cars and 448 trucks in 2009. The highway passes through rural Charlevoix County where the terrain has many rolling hills and begins to descend to Lake Michigan. As the highway enters the southern section of the city of Petoskey it runs along Spring Street passing retail establishments and the Odawa Casino Resort, owned by the Little Traverse Bay Bands of Odawa Indians. At the northern terminus of US 131, US 31 turns off Charlevoix Avenue and follows Spring Street to the north.

=== Services ===
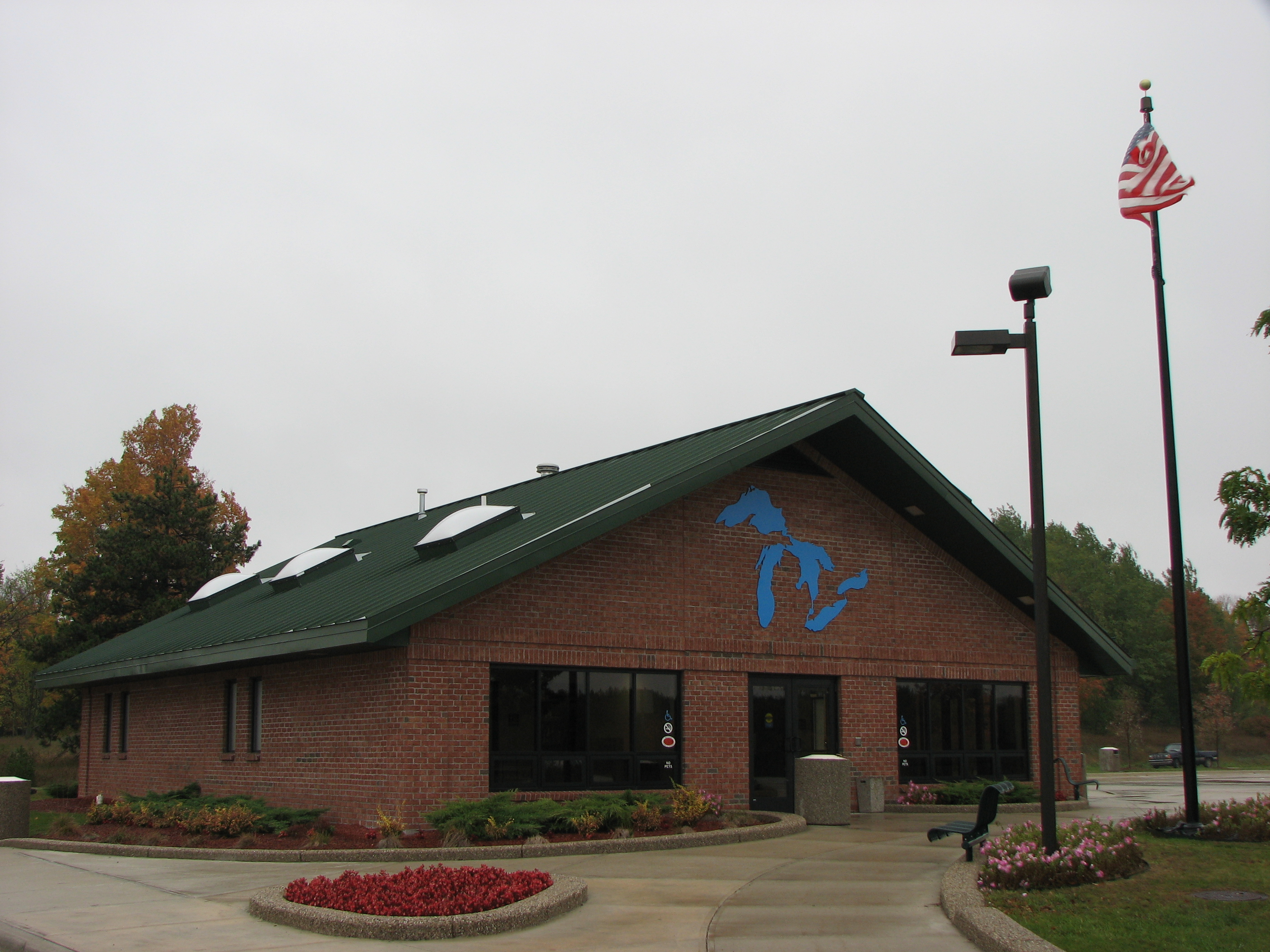
Cadillac rest area off northbound US 131

MDOT operates 67 rest areas and 14 welcome centers in the state, all named in honor of retired department employees, although in some cases an honoree's name may be dropped from the rest area. Eight of these are along US 131, providing bathroom facilities, dog runs, picnic areas and usually vending machines. The rest areas near Kalamazoo, Rockford, Big Rapids and Tustin serve southbound traffic while those near Morley and Cadillac serve the northbound side of the freeway. The two near Manton and Fife Lake are accessible from both directions. A ninth rest area used to exist near Cutlerville on the northbound side of US 131, but this location was demolished on January 22, 2001, to make way for the interchange with M-6. The department wanted to build a replacement near Dorr, in northern Allegan County, but the plans were canceled in late 2001.

MDOT has also built carpool lots for motorists along the freeway. There are 21 lots, all but one adjacent to a freeway interchange. The department touts these lots as a way to save money and benefit the environment, and has partnered with a network of local agencies offering Local Rideshare Offices.

== History ==
=== Early history ===
Before Michigan became a state, the first land transportation corridors were the Indian trails. The original Mackinaw Trail ran roughly parallel to the route of the modern US 131 from east of Kalkaska to Petoskey. In the 19th century, the Michigan Legislature chartered private companies to build and operate plank roads or turnpikes in the state. These roads were originally made of oak planks, but later legislation permitted gravel as well. Two thoroughfares in the Grand Rapids area, Division and Plainfield avenues, were originally plank roads. The companies were funded through the collection of tolls. The infrastructure was expensive to maintain, and often the turnpikes fell into disrepair as the wood warped and rotted away. Mark Twain once commented that "the road could not have been bad if some unconscionable scoundrel had not now and then dropped a plank across it," after a trip on the Kalamazoo and Grand Rapids Plank Road. By the first decade of the 20th century, only 23 of the 202 chartered turnpikes were still in operation; many companies that received a charter never built their specified roadways. The remaining plank roads were turned over to the state or purchased by railway companies in the early part of the century.

The first state-maintained highway along the path of US 131 was M-13, a designation applied to the road by July 1, 1919. (Note: The first state highways in Michigan were signposted in 1919.) US 131 debuted along with the rest of the initial US Highway System on November 11, 1926, although at the time it was shown on maps from the Michigan–Indiana state line north to the small Northern Michigan community of Acme in Grand Traverse County. The northernmost section of the highway between Fife Lake and Acme was not signposted in the field and the designation ended instead at Fife Lake, about 213 miles (343 km) north of the state line. At the same time, the Michigan State Highway Department (MSHD) (Note: The Michigan State Highway Department was reorganized into the Michigan Department of State Highways and Transportation on August 23, 1973, and the name was later shortened to its current form in 1978.) redesignated the remainder of M-13, between Fife Lake and Petoskey, as M-131. Public Act 131 of 1931 allowed the MSHD to take control over the city streets that carried state highways through cities in the state. Until this point, the City of Grand Rapids arbitrarily moved the route of state highways through the city on a regular basis. The department took control of a series of streets and fixed the routing of US 131 through the city after the passage of the act. The highway was shifted between Three Rivers and Constantine to the west side of the St. Joseph River in 1936. In late 1938 or early 1939, the MSHD extended US 131 northward over the southern section of M-131. After the changes US 131 turned eastward into Fife Lake and north to Kalkaska and Mancelona before ending in Petoskey. This extension connected US 131 directly to its parent highway, US 31, for the first time. By the end of the 1930s, the MSHD under the leadership of future governor Murray Van Wagoner had shifted emphasis to a program of road improvements designed to make the state's roads "safer and smoother for burgeoning traffic volumes."

In 1940, a new roadway was opened, completing the third side of a triangle between the junction with M-113, Walton Corners and Fife Lake. US 131 was shifted to the new highway and the former routing along the other two sides of the triangle became part of M-113 and M-186. A second realignment opened the following year between Fife Lake and Kalkaska. US 131 no longer turned east along Boardman Road between South Boardman and Lodi. Instead the MSHD rerouted the highway directly to the northeast, from the end of the previous new routing north of Fife Lake to Kalaska. By 1945, a Bypass US 131 (Byp. US 131) was created around the south and east sides of Grand Rapids, following 28th Street and East Beltline Avenue, while the main highway continued to run through downtown unchanged. A decade later, mainline US 131 was rerouted around Grand Rapids over the former bypass route, and Business US 131 (Bus. US 131) was created for the former route through downtown. A second business loop was created in Three Rivers, Michigan, after an expressway bypass of the city's downtown was opened in early 1954. Another expressway section was opened between Mancelona and the M-32 junction west of Elmira in late 1956.

=== Freeway conversion ===
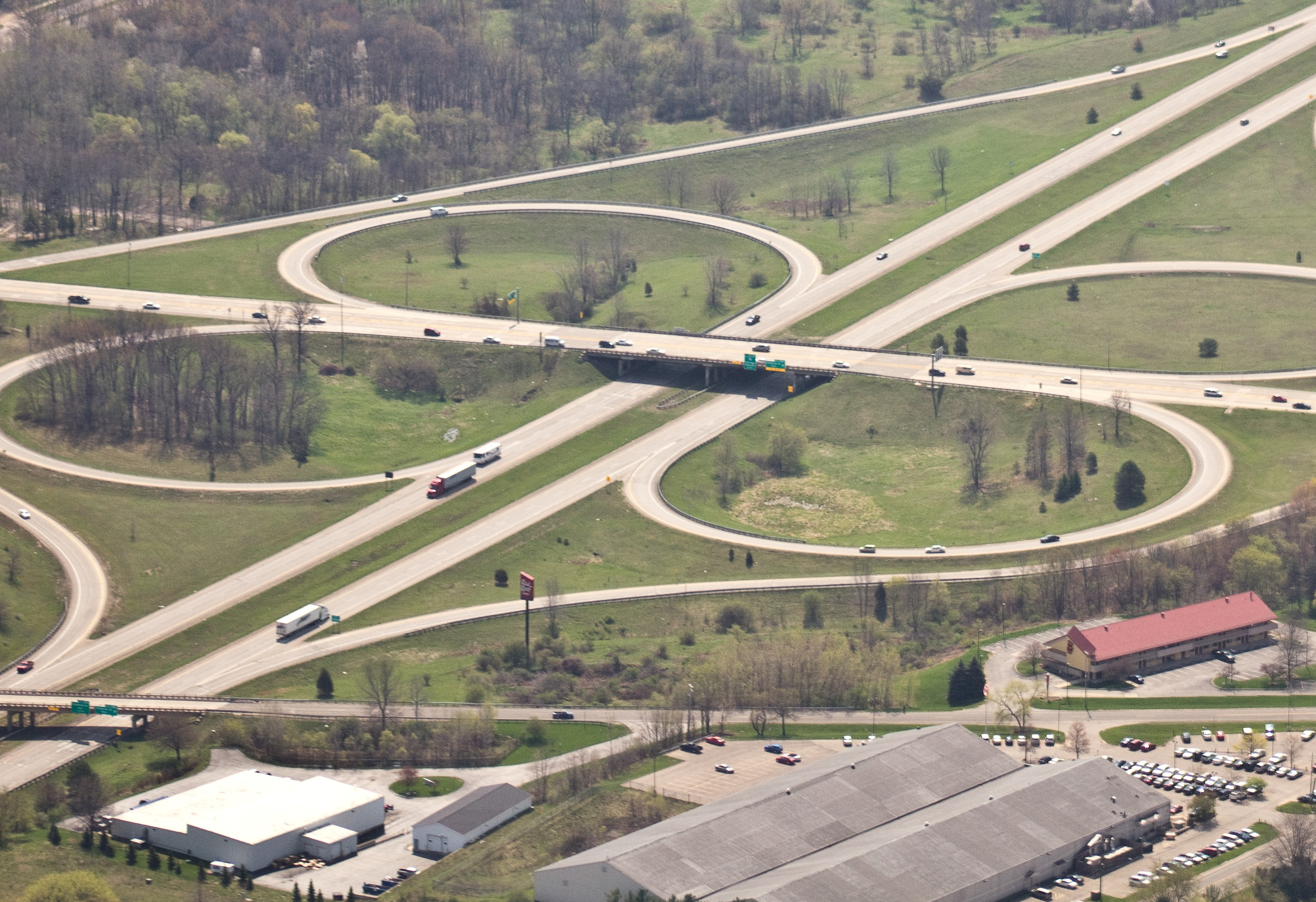
The former cloverleaf interchange between US 131 and Stadium Drive west of Kalamazoo in 2010 before conversion to a single-point urban interchange in 2015

By the end of 1957, US 131 had been realigned as an expressway from the Three Rivers bypass to Moorepark. The section of freeway in the Grand Rapids area opened near the southern county line north to 28th Street. This latter freeway segment was extended farther south to Wayland by the middle of 1958. By the middle of 1960, the freeway was extended to M-118 in Martin, where traffic used M-118 to connect back to the old routing. The southern end of US 131 was moved to another location on the state line. Instead of running concurrently with US 112 between White Pigeon and Mottville, US 131 ran directly south of White Pigeon to the state line. In the process, the M-103 designation was swapped with US 131.

The MSHD had proposed that the section of US 131 south of Kalamazoo be built as an electronic highway under a bid through General Motors the same year; the testing for such a roadway was ultimately done at Ohio State University instead. Another project, through the end of 1961, extended the freeway south to Plainwell and north into downtown Grand Rapids. This extension was designated as part of Bus. US 131 and opened in December 1961. The opening ceremony for the bridge across the Grand River included the state highway commission and the then-Miss Michigan, pulled by a team of sled dogs, to lead the first traffic over the river.

Until the early 1960s, US 131 never left the state of Michigan; the southernmost point was always at the Indiana state line. In 1961, the highway designation was extended to its current southern terminus in rural Elkhart County, Indiana at a connection with the Indiana Toll Road at the request of the state of Michigan. The MSHD asked the Indiana State Highway Department (ISHD) (Note: The Indiana State Highway Department, later the Indiana Department of Highways, was merged into the Indiana Department of Transportation in 1989.) to extend US 131 farther to reconnect with US 31 in Indiana near Indianapolis. Michigan State Highway Commissioner John C. Mackie said that officials with the IHSD were "receptive to the idea" of a further addition to Indianapolis which would provide a "great benefit to Michigan's tourist industry".

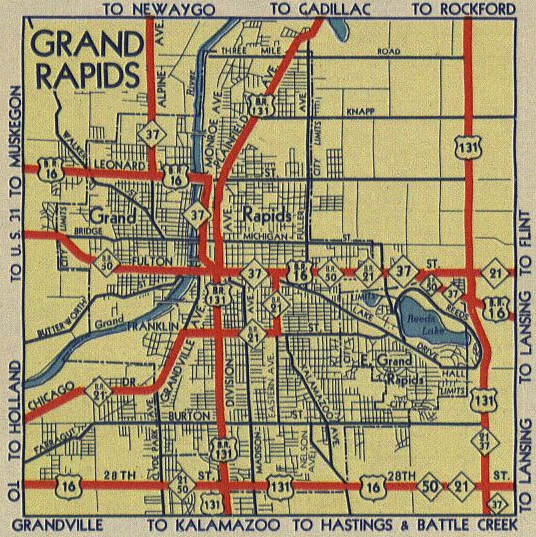
Inset map from the October 1, 1957, Official Highway Map showing the highway configuration of Grand Rapids at that time

On December 17, 1962, the freeway through downtown Grand Rapids was completed, including the section marked as I-296. (Note: Unlike the rest of US 131, the section that is officially I-296 was funded by the federal government as a part of the Interstate Highway System because it was constructed and included in the system before 1978. The Surface Transportation Assistance Act of 1978 provided that all Interstate construction authorized under previous amendments to the system would be funded by the federal government but additional highway mileage added under 23 U.S.C. § 103(c)(4)(A) would not be funded from the same highway fund.) The business loop was removed from the freeway when US 131 took its place. East Beltline Avenue was renumbered as an extension of M-44, while 28th Street retained the M-11/M-21 designations it had in addition to US 131. I-296/US 131 ran alongside the Grand River between I-96 downtown and I-196 north of town. (Note: At the time, I-96 was the designation for the Benton Harbor–Grand Rapids–Detroit freeway and I-196 was in use on the Muskegon–Grand Rapids freeway. The two Interstate designations were later flipped from the split near Grand Rapids in 1963.) At the end of I-296, US 131 followed I-196 east to the northern portion of the business loop at Plainfield Avenue and followed Plainfield Avenue back to the remainder of its routing north of Grand Rapids. The other end of the freeway was extended south to M-43 on the west side of Kalamazoo. Traffic there was directed along M-43 into downtown to connect with the remainder of the highway.

Freeway construction continued through the 1960s. By the end of 1963, the southern section of freeway was extended to Schoolcraft. The following year, a business loop in Kalamazoo was created. The new loop used a freeway stub on the north and M-43 on the south to connect the main highway to the former routing of US 131 along Westnedge and Park avenues downtown. A discontinuous segment of freeway, south of Cadillac into Osceola County, opened in September 1966. The freeway was extended north from the Grand Rapids area through the Comstock Park area in 1966. That year, the former Grand Rapids Speedrome, a local race car track was closed. Located on North Park Street between the North Park Bridge and West River Drive, the track was in operation from 1950 until it was closed for the freeway construction in 1966. The freeway was extended further to M-57 (14 Mile Road) near Cedar Springs in 1969.

In 1968, the section of expressway near Mancelona was downgraded to a two-lane highway. The original roadway had been left in place when a new parallel carriageway was built in 1956. During the winter months, the original lanes built in the 1920s were closed because the grade of the roadway accumulated additional snow and made it difficult to plow. The MSHD had considered reconstructing the older road to retain the expressway setup, but that would have cost $1.5 million while removing it and permanently reconfiguring the 1956 roadway cost only $170,000 (equivalent to $10.6 million and $1,200,000 in 2025).

The 1970s saw the US 131 freeway expand to north of Grand Rapids. The section between the two M-57 junctions near Rockford and in Cedar Springs opened on September 21, 1973, at a dedication ceremony featuring then-Congressman Gerald R. Ford. By the end of the year, the freeway would be open as far north as Howard City. At the same time, M-46 was realigned to extend south down the freeway to Cedar Springs and west to replace M-57 west of Rockford.

Construction to complete these sections north of Grand Rapids had been delayed in 1967. Before the delays, the MSHD planned to have the gap in the freeway between Grand Rapids and Cadillac completed by 1974. The state even proposed adding the freeway north of Grand Rapids to Petoskey, with a further continuation to Mackinaw City as part of the Interstate Highway System in an effort to receive additional funding in 1968. In September 1972, the US 131 Area Development Association lobbied Congress to "expedite funding and priority for the reconstruction of US 131 in Michigan."

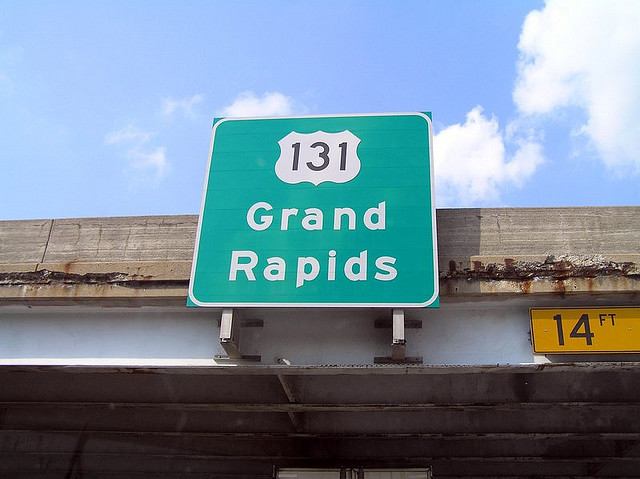
Guide sign mounted to a freeway overpass

The 12.2-mile (19.6 km) section of US 131 freeway south of the Wexford–Osceola county line was opened on November 9, 1976, at a cost of $7.4 million (equivalent to $32.5 million in 2025). By 1977, the state postponed any plans to complete the freeway north of Cadillac. The department cited rising construction material costs and opposition to the freeway in Petoskey. (Note: Resort patrons in the Petoskey area had opposed a freeway in the area since 1957 based on concerns over an increase in traffic such a road could bring to the area, diminishing the area's "exclusivity" from a "deluge of tourists".) By the end of the decade, I-296 signs were removed from the section of freeway in Grand Rapids. However, the freeway remains listed as a part of the Interstate Highway System.

The next section of freeway opened between Howard City and Stanwood in 1980. Another segment was opened farther north, bypassing Big Rapids by 1984. The former route through town and a section of M-20 were designated as a business loop simultaneously. US 131 followed 19 Mile Road between the end of the freeway and the former routing north of town. The gap was filled in when the freeway segment between Big Rapids and Osceola County was opened in 1986. The section of highway along 19 Mile Road was transferred to the Big Rapids business loop to connect it back to the new freeway. When the expansions ended, in the mid-1980s, it was expected that the US 131 freeway would end at the south side of Cadillac, "perhaps forever". MDOT had ended all consideration of additional freeway mileage in 1981, citing decreased gas tax revenues, decreased traffic and higher construction costs. A 1979 report said that while traffic forecasts showed continued growth, upgrades to existing roads would be sufficient to handle traffic needs.

=== S-Curve replacement ===
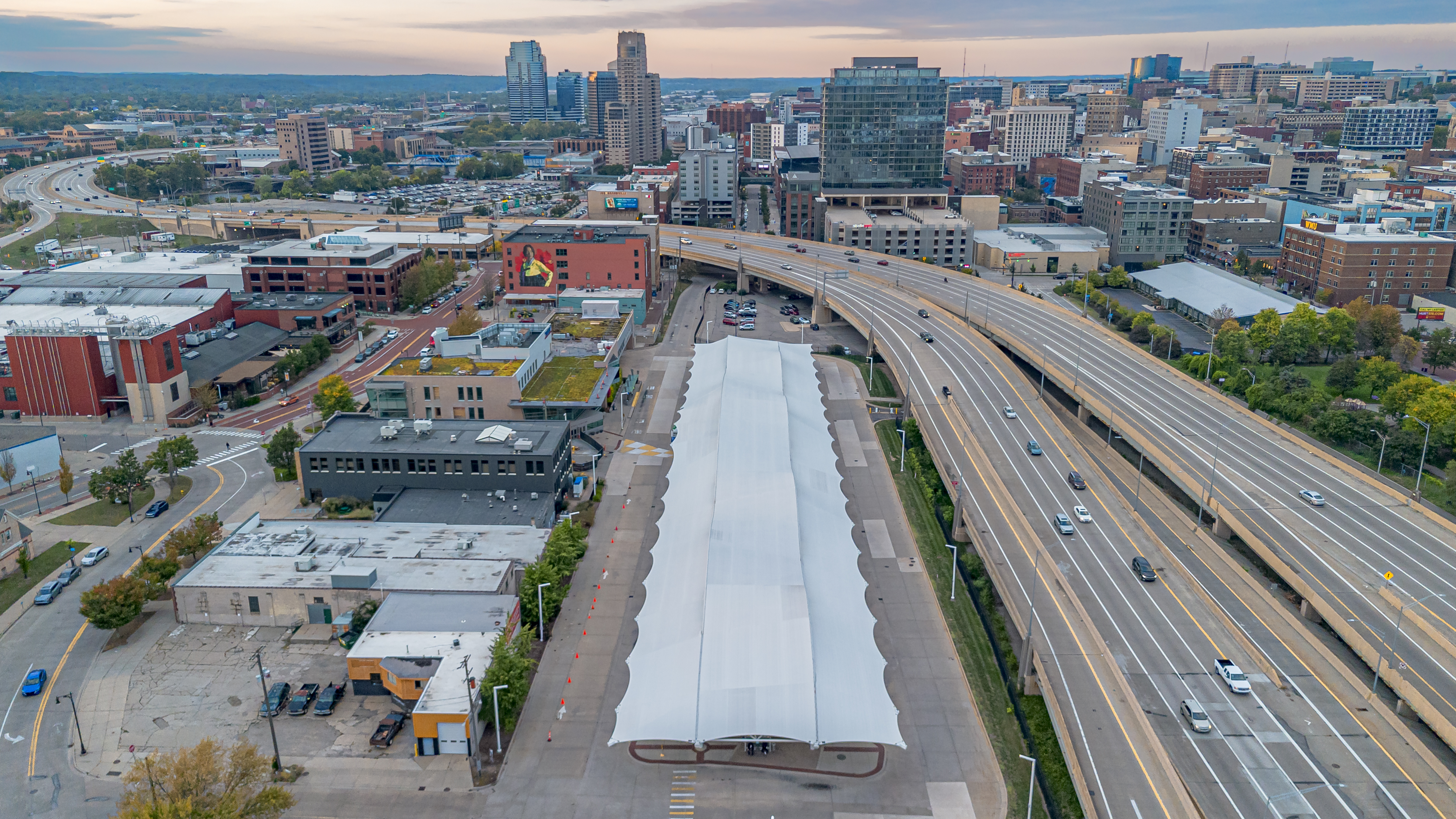
S-Curve downtown Grand Rapids in 2025

One of the more unusual sections of the US 131 freeway in the Grand Rapids area is the S-Curve. This section of freeway carries US 131 over the Grand River with two sharp turns in the road, resembling the letter S. The design for this structure was completed in 1952 and placed the freeway on the least expensive land in the area, despite the knowledge that it would someday create issues. As noted by The Grand Rapids Press in 1981, "the speed limit on the S-Curve must be reduced as low as 25 miles per hour [40 km/h] on some bad-weather days because of the sharpness of the turns and [the] numerous accidents [that] have occurred there."

On December 27, 1999, the state awarded an $85.7 million contract (equivalent to $156 million in 2025) for the replacement of the S-Curve on US 131. Deposits of gypsum under the roadway were dissolving and causing it to settle. A deteriorating bridge also forced the reconstruction of the freeway through the area. Construction began on January 15, 2000, diverting the roughly 115,000 vehicles per day that used the stretch of road to detours through the downtown area. As part of the project, a $1.2 million (equivalent to $2.13 million in 2025) de-icing system was installed. The system is designed to spray a de-icing fluid on the roadway that would be carried by car tires up to a mile (1.6 km) along the road surface. This fluid is expected to melt ice at temperatures below the −20 °F (−29 °C) at which salt stops working. Unlike salt, the non-corrosive de-icer does not harm the bridge, but it is more costly. The system is designed to be activated manually, or automatically via sensors along the road. However, plowing would still be required on the roadway. The idea behind the de-icing system is to keep the pavement wet and prevent the formation of ice.

Construction delays were caused by river flooding during spring rains. A design mistake meant that one of the bridges in the structure was built a foot (30 cm) too low, and Grandville Avenue was lowered to compensate for the error. Before the opening, MDOT held a ribbon-cutting ceremony on the freeway to allow local residents to walk along the structure on August 12. The first northbound lanes were opened to traffic in mid-August, three weeks ahead of schedule. Lead contractor Kiewit Western, a company whose "employees have been known to work 13-hour days and 100-hour weeks", accelerated their work schedule over the course of the project to compensate for the delays and still finish the venture early. The remaining lanes opened to traffic on October 26, also ahead of schedule. Additional work started after the main roadway opened by closing various ramps for reconstruction. This work also focused on restoring parking lots located under or adjacent to the freeway and testing the de-icing system; the final ramps were opened in early December 2000 and early January 2001. The end result of the construction produced a freeway design that increased the rated traffic speed from 45 to 50 mph (72 to 80 km/h).

=== 21st century changes ===
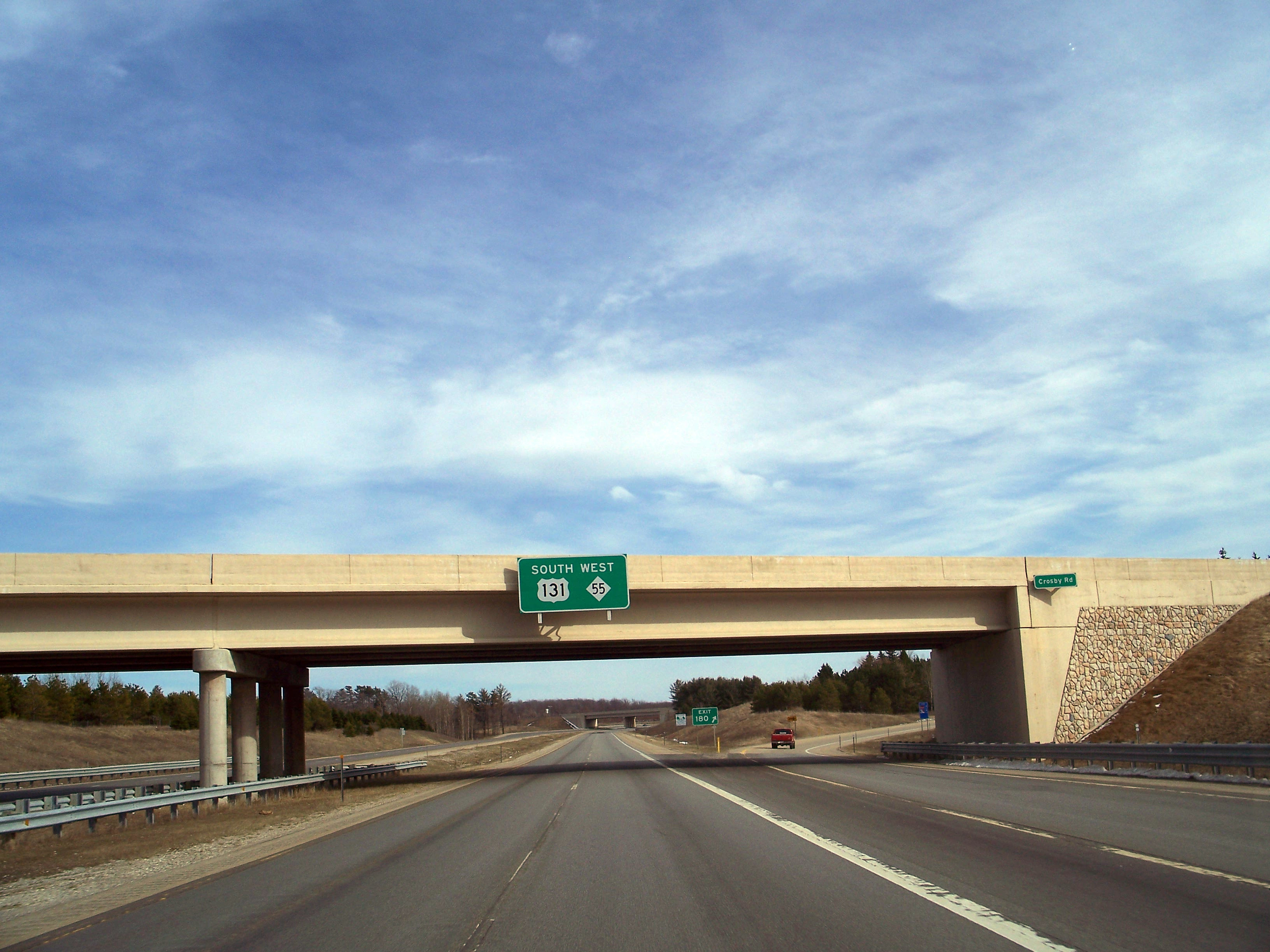
M-55 merging onto US 131 on the Cadillac bypass

MDOT approved a $3.5 billion 10-year transportation plan (equivalent to $8.7 billion in 2025) in 1986 that included an extension of the US 131 freeway north to Manton. Construction started on the Cadillac bypass in 1999, and the first section was opened to traffic in November 2000. This 3.5-mile (5.6 km) southern segment ran from US 131 south of town to M-55 east of downtown. US 131 remained routed through downtown, but M-55 was rerouted to the bypass. Local residents were allowed to use the northern section of the bypass for recreational activities until it was opened to traffic. The full 9.2-mile (14.8 km) bypass around Cadillac was dedicated to Sidney Ouwinga in a ceremony on October 27, 2001, and the road was opened to traffic on October 30, 2001. The former routing through town was redesignated Bus. US 131 at the same time. Ouwinga was a state lawmaker who died in 1991 while serving in the Michigan House of Representatives. He was also a member of the US 131 Area Development Association which promoted further northern extensions of the freeway. The 10.5-mile (16.9 km) freeway expansion north around the city of Manton was opened in 2003. The former routing was redesignated as a business loop at the time. The two bypasses cost $146 million (equivalent to $253 million in 2025) to complete.

Constantine bypass maps
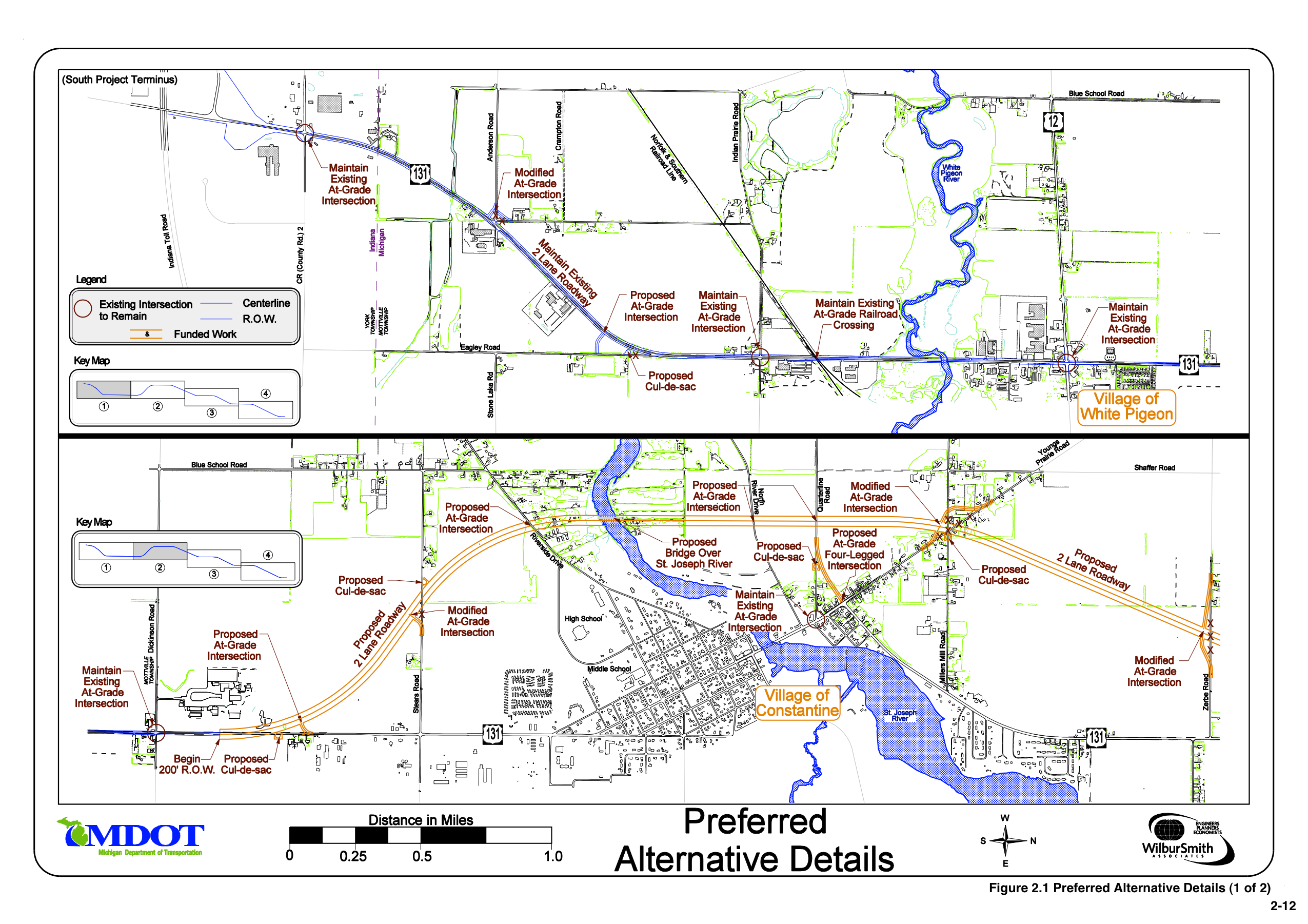

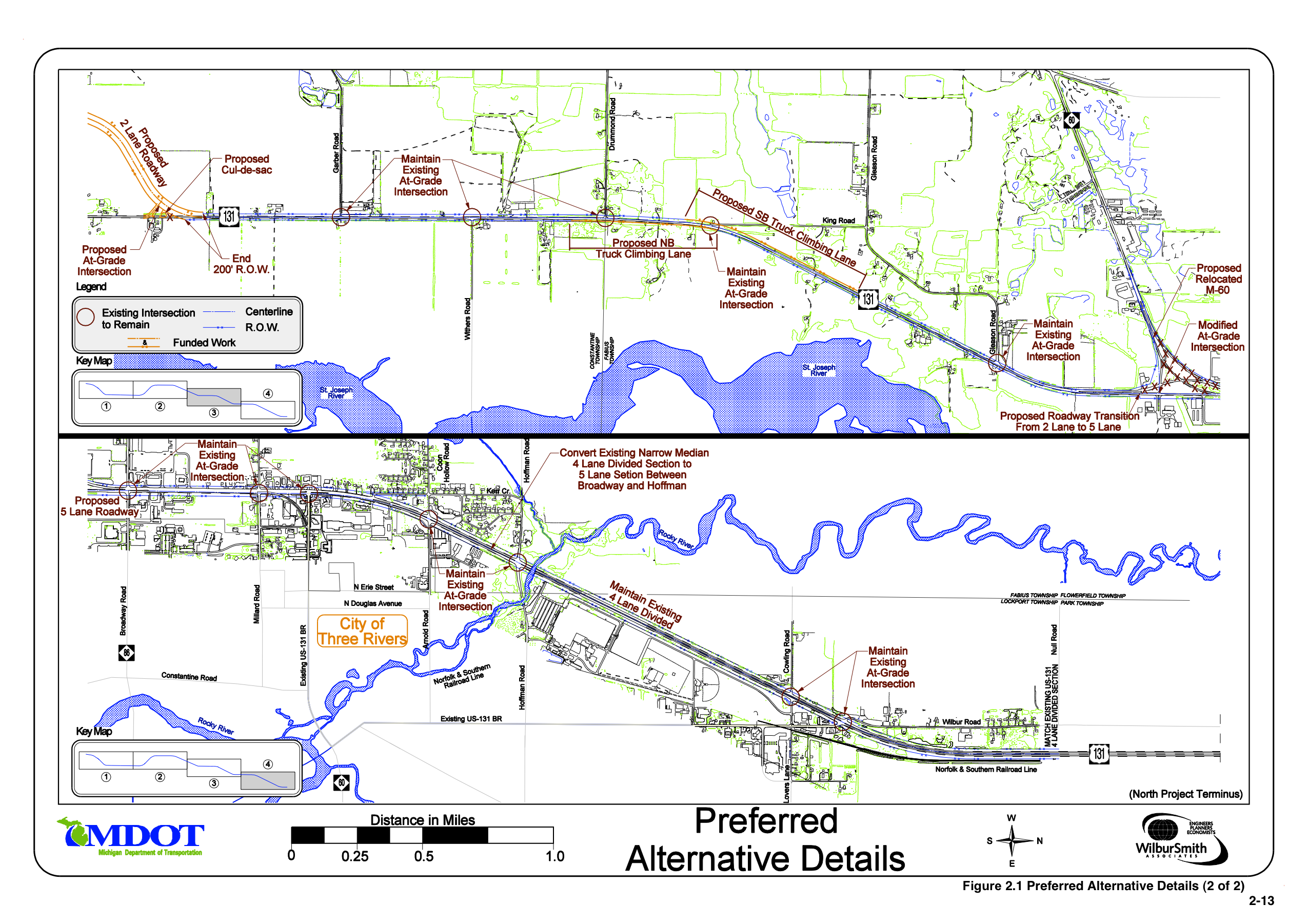
MDOT's planning maps for the bypass
(north is to the right)

Design plans for the new bridge over the St. Joseph River were announced in January 2011. The expected groundbreaking on the venture was scheduled for February 4, 2013, with planned completion in 2014. Residents in the community were divided over the proposed five-mile (8.0 km) highway. Business owners look to the 3,000 cars and trucks that pass through downtown Constantine each day for customers, traffic that would be diverted around the village by the new roadway. On the other hand, residents that work outside of the small community were looking forward to decreased commute times to their workplaces. The bypass opened on October 30, 2013.

The City of Kalamazoo accepted jurisdiction of the trunklines within the city's downtown from MDOT in January 2019; M-43 was rerouted out of the city as a result. After the change, M-43 ran concurrently along US 131 from Oshtemo Township on the west side of Kalamazoo to Plainwell. Bus. US 131 in Kalamazoo was also truncated, and the BL I-94 overlap removed.

== Future ==
Originally, MDOT and its predecessor agencies had planned to convert US 131 into a freeway all the way to Petoskey. They suggested adding the highway to the Interstate Highway System in the late 1960s, when the federal government took proposals for additions to the network of highways. While further northward extension of the freeway from Manton to Kalkaska and beyond was postponed by the department in the 1970s, and canceled "perhaps forever" in the early 1980s, MDOT made an attempt to revive the extension to Kalkaska in 2000. The proposal was ultimately abandoned when the year's transportation plan was finalized. A bridge replacement project over the Manistee River in 2009–10 ensured the end of further consideration by MDOT of the proposal. According to the local project director, "currently, the department has no plans [to expand the freeway]. Someday it may happen, but not in the foreseeable future."

A southerly extension of the freeway to or near the Indiana state line is still under study. Improvements to the US 131 corridor from Portage to the Indiana Toll Road have been underway for several years and although a late-2005 decision by MDOT to not pursue a new controlled-access route through St. Joseph County seemed to terminate the discussion, public outcry and backlash from local legislators forced the department to re-evaluate its decision. State House Speaker Craig DeRoche was critical of the original decision, citing the economic development benefit such a road would bring to the area in defense of the proposed freeway. The previous "no-build decision" was rescinded in April 2006.

MDOT has begun a project to upgrade a 16.4-mile (26.4 km) segment of US 131 in St. Joseph County, home of one of the most dangerous roadway sections in Southwest Michigan for auto crashes. The final environmental impact statement for the project was published in mid-2008 and the preferred alternative consists of a two-lane road bypassing the village of Constantine. The new highway would maintain access to local roads via at-grade intersections, and the department would maintain jurisdiction of the old route through town. (Note: The American Association of State Highway and Transportation Officials, which is in charge of US Highway numbering assignments and routings, approved the relocation of the US 131 designation out of Constantine on November 16, 2012. The group's Special Committee on U.S. Route Numbering also approved the creation of a business route for the old highway through town.) MDOT has stated that present traffic demands do not warrant the cost of a full freeway facility on a new alignment from the Indiana Toll Road to north of Three Rivers, stating that such a project would cost over $300 million (equivalent to $460 million in 2025) to build. Construction plans were placed on hold after an announcement in June 2009 as various proposals around the state, including the Constantine bypass, were shelved until funding issues could be resolved. In total, 137 road and bridge projects totaling $740 million were delayed to 2012 because the state could not match available federal funding to pay for the work.

== Memorial designations ==
US 131 and its predecessors bears several memorial designations in addition to the Sidney Ouwinga Memorial Bypass near Cadillac. One of the oldest is the Mackinaw Trail, named after a former Indian trail that ran from Saginaw to Mackinaw City and Sault Ste. Marie. By 1915, the name was transferred to the roadway that was later numbered US 131. The Mackinaw Trail Association was formed that year to promote an all-weather highway between Grand Rapids and Mackinaw City, using a logo incorporating a trout for the road. The name was to be officially applied to the highway in 1929, but the State Senate did not agree to the proposal. The official endorsement of the name came in 1959, after the opening of the Mackinac Bridge revitalized the idea.

During World War I, households would display a service flag if a family member was serving in the war. A blue star denoted a service member in action, and a gold star symbolized someone who died in the military. In St. Joseph County, the chapters of the Daughters of the American Revolution and the American Legion wanted to honor the local fallen soldiers. Using the flags as inspiration, they planted 100 black walnut and four Norway spruce trees along the road south of Three Rivers. Dedicated on May 4, 1924, this tribute was named the Gold Star Memorial Highway and ran for 1.5 miles (2.4 km) along what is now US 131 south of Three Rivers.

In 1921, the section of highway south of Kalamazoo was named part of the Colgrove Highway. This designation included several other roads in the Lower Peninsula, all named in honor of Philip Colgrove, the first president of the Michigan Good Roads Association. Colgrove was also the Barry County prosecutor and a state senator in the late 19th century. No maps document the name, although the original law remains in records. The Michigan Legislature proposed a bill in 2000 that would have repealed the 1921 statute naming the Colgrove Highway, but the bill ultimately faded, sparing the name.

In the age of the auto trails, it was common for highways to be named rather than numbered. An attempt to create a trail such as the Lincoln Highway failed in Michigan. School children in 1926 from Anderson, Indiana, wanted to honor James Whitcomb Riley, the poet from the Hoosier State, with a highway that connected the country's summer and winter resort areas. The Michigan segment of the road running through the state was to follow what would later be US 131. The James Whitcomb Riley Association promoted the highway by painting white bands on telephone poles with the name of the road in orange letters during that August and September. However, the road in question was already named the Mackinaw Trail, and the association did not secure permission of the state highway commissioner, as was required by a 1919 Michigan law. The law made it illegal for any "association to delineate or mark any other routes or trails through the State of Michigan... unless the same shall be approved in writing by the State Highway Commissioner." As a result, government officials refused to endorse the association's proposal, and Michigan was excluded from the highway. The efforts of the national association were stunted by the halted progress, and the highway was disbanded by December 1926.

The Michigan Trail, another auto trail from the 1920s, "followed just about every major trunk line at that time in the Lower Peninsula and covered over a thousand miles [1,600 km] of state highways." The Michigan Trail started in Toledo, Ohio, and ran to Detroit; its branches extended to New Buffalo, Grand Rapids, and Port Huron. Other segments included US 131 between Kalamazoo and Petoskey, US 31 between New Buffalo and the Straits of Mackinac and a route between Port Huron and Big Rapids. The highway failed as a concept because it lacked focus, and many of the segments of roadway had already assigned names.

The most recent name applied to US 131 is related to the first. Enacted in 2004, Public Act 138 added an additional name to the Mackinaw Trail from the M-66 junction near Kalkaska to Petoskey, the "Green Arrow Route-Mackinaw Trail". Residents of the state have questioned the wisdom of having a "compound road name whose signboards [would] be nearly as long as the highway itself."

== Historic bridges ==
MDOT maintains a listing of historic bridges that includes two which formerly carried US 131. In 1913, the State Trunk Line Act required the highway department to build and maintain bridges at the state's expense if they were included in the nascent highway system. Among the first of these state-built structures is the Division Avenue–Plaster Creek Bridge in Grand Rapids. The crossing is listed on the NRHP for its architectural and engineering significance. Built as Trunk Line Bridge No. 3 over Plaster Creek in 1914 by the MSHD, the span cost just over $6,000 (equivalent to $140,000 in 2025). Division Avenue carried US 131 until the construction of the freeway through Grand Rapids in the 1960s. The bridge, a filled spandrel arch design, is 50-foot-long (15 m), and was modified in 1935 to widen its deck from 28 feet (8.5 m) to the current 43 feet (13 m). The structure was added to the NRHP on December 17, 1999.

The second bridge listed by MDOT is the crossing of the Little Muskegon River for 190th Avenue in southern Mecosta County. Like the Plaster Creek bridge, this structure was also built by the MSHD under the Trunk Line Act of 1913. Built in 1916–17 the 45-foot-long (14 m), 18-foot-wide (5.5 m), concrete through-girder bridge cost around $10,000 (equivalent to $170,000 in 2025) to build. It was initially named Trunk Line Bridge No. 61. The span is the oldest concrete girder bridge designed by the MSHD. US 131 followed 190th Avenue over the river until a realignment shifted the highway to another route in 1927.

== Exit list ==
County	Location	mi (Note: Milepost numbers reset at the Indiana–Michigan state line crossing.)	km	Exit	Destinations	Notes
Elkhart	York Township	0.000	0.000		I-80 / I-90 / Indiana Toll Road – Chicago, Ohio SR 13 south – Middlebury	Southern end of hidden SR 13 concurrency to state line; roadway continues southward as SR 13; I-80/I-90/ITR exit 107
Indiana–Michigan state line		0.643 0.000	1.035 0.000	Northern end of SR 13 at state line		
St. Joseph	White Pigeon	2.881	4.637		US 12 – Niles, Sturgis	
St. Joseph	Constantine Township	4.352	7.004		Bus. US 131 north – Constantine	Southern terminus of Bus. US 131
St. Joseph	Constantine Township	8.540	13.744		Bus. US 131 south – Constantine	Northern terminus of Bus. US 131
St. Joseph	Fabius Township	12.156	19.563		Southern end of divided highway	
St. Joseph	Fabius Township	12.419– 12.718	19.986– 20.468		M-60 west – Niles	Southern end of M-60 concurrency
St. Joseph	Three Rivers	13.596	21.881		Bus. US 131 north / M-60 east to M-86 east – Three Rivers, Jackson	Northern end of M-60 concurrency; southern terminus of Bus. US 131
St. Joseph	Three Rivers	15.815	25.452		Bus. US 131 south (Wilbur Road) – Three Rivers	Northern terminus of Bus. US 131
St. Joseph	Park Township	22.479	36.176		M-216 west – Marcellus	Eastern terminus of M-216
Kalamazoo	Portage	27.837	44.799	Northern end of divided highway Southern end of freeway		
Kalamazoo	Portage	31.606	50.865	31	Centre Avenue – Portage	
Kalamazoo	Portage	34.292– 34.310	55.188– 55.217	34	I-94 – Detroit, Chicago	Signed as exits 34A (east) and 34B (west) northbound; I-94 exits 74A-B; former western terminus of BL I-94
Kalamazoo	Oshtemo Township	36.601	58.904	36	Stadium Drive – Kalamazoo, Oshtemo	Former southern end of Bus. US 131; former BL I-94 east
Kalamazoo	Oshtemo Township	38.580	62.088	38	M-43 west – South Haven, Kalamazoo	Southern end of M-43 concurrency; signed as exits 38A (Kalamazoo) and 38B (M-43) northbound; access to Kalamazoo via Main Street east
Kalamazoo	Oshtemo Township	40.894	65.813	41	Bus. US 131 south – Downtown Kalamazoo	Left exit and entrance southbound; northern terminus of Bus. US 131
Kalamazoo	Alamo Township	44.194	71.123	44	D Avenue	
Allegan	Plainwell	49.278	79.305	49	M-43 east / M-89 – Plainwell, Otsego, Allegan	Northern end of M-43 concurrency; signed as exits 49A (east) and 49B (west); Allegan signed northbound only, Otsego signed southbound only
Allegan	Gun Plain Township	50.353	81.035	50	106th Avenue	Southbound exit and northbound entrance
Allegan	Martin Township	55.397	89.153	55	M-222 west – Martin, Allegan	Eastern terminus of M-222; Allegan signed southbound only
Allegan	Hopkins–Watson– Martin–Wayland township quadri-point	59.357	95.526	59	Shelbyville	Connects to 124th Avenue
Allegan	Wayland Township	61.867	99.565	61	M-179 east – Bradley A-42 west – Hopkins	Western terminus of M-179; eastern terminus of A-42
Allegan	Wayland	64.885	104.422	64	135th Avenue – Wayland	
Allegan	Dorr Township	68.544	110.311	68	142nd Avenue – Dorr, Moline	
Kent	Byron Township	72.564	116.780	72	100th Street	
Kent	Byron Township	74.573	120.014	74	84th Street – Byron Center	
Kent	Byron Township	75.601	121.668	75	76th Street	
Kent	Byron Township	76.259	122.727	76	68th Street – Cutlerville	Exits 76 and 77 are connected northbound through collector–distributor roads
Kent	Byron Township	77.198– 77.218	124.238– 124.270	77	M-6 – Holland, Lansing	M-6 exit 8
Kent	Wyoming	78.400	126.173	78	54th Street	
Kent	Wyoming	79.670	128.216	79	44th Street – Kentwood, Grandville	
Kent	Wyoming	80.685	129.850	80	36th Street	
Kent	Wyoming	81.693	131.472	81	M-11 (28th Street) – Wyoming	
Kent	Grand Rapids	82.733	133.146	82	Burton Street	Signed as exits 82A (east) and 82B (west) southbound and exit 82A northbound
Kent	Grand Rapids	83.151	133.819	82B	Hynes Avenue	Northbound exit only
Kent	Grand Rapids	83.711	134.720	83A	Hall Street	
Kent	Grand Rapids	84.231	135.557	83B	Martin Luther King Jr. Street	Formerly known as Franklin Street; former BS I-196
Kent	Grand Rapids	84.769	136.422	84A	Wealthy Street	Left exit northbound
Kent	Grand Rapids	84.962	136.733	84B	Cherry Street – Downtown Grand Rapids	Northbound exit and southbound entrance; former Bus. US 131 north
Kent	Grand Rapids	85.195	137.108	85A	Market Avenue	Southbound exit and northbound entrance
Kent	Grand Rapids	85.681	137.890	85B	Pearl Street	
Kent	Grand Rapids	86.119– 86.129	138.595– 138.611	86	I-196 (G.R. Ford Freeway) – Lansing, Holland; I-296 north	Southern end of unsigned I-296 concurrency; signed as exits 86A (east) and 86B (west)
Kent	Grand Rapids	86.944	139.923	87	Leonard Street	Former Bus. US 131 south
Kent	Grand Rapids	87.695	141.131	88	Ann Street	
Kent	Walker	88.777– 89.570	142.873– 144.149	89	I-96 / M-37 – Lansing, Muskegon; I-296 south	Northern end of unsigned I-296 concurrency; signed as exits 89A (east) and 89B (west) southbound; left exit northbound
Kent	Plainfield Township	90.982	146.421	91	West River Drive – Comstock Park	
Kent	Plainfield Township	94.946	152.801	95	Post Drive – Belmont	
Kent	Plainfield–Algoma township line	97.286	156.567	97	10 Mile Road – Rockford	
Kent	Algoma Township	101.743	163.739	101	M-57 east – Greenville B-72 west – Sparta	Western terminus of M-57; eastern terminus of B-72
Kent	Solon Township	104.799	168.658	104	M-46 west – Muskegon, Cedar Springs	Southern end of M-46 concurrency
Kent–Montcalm county line	Nelson–Pierson township line	110.414	177.694	110	Sand Lake	Connects to 22 Mile Road
Montcalm	Pierson Township	114.006	183.475	114	Pierson	Connects to Cannonsville Road
Montcalm	Reynolds Township	118.099	190.062	118	M-82 west – Howard City, Newaygo	Eastern terminus of M-82
Montcalm	Reynolds Township	120.311	193.622	120	M-46 east – Saginaw	Northern end of M-46 concurrency
Mecosta	Aetna Township	125.054	201.255	125	Jefferson Road – Morley	
Mecosta	Mecosta Township	131.569	211.740	131	M-20 west – White Cloud	Southern end of M-20 concurrency
Mecosta	Big Rapids Township	139.019	223.729	139	Bus. US 131 north / M-20 east – Big Rapids	Northern end of M-20 concurrency; signposted as M-20 only southbound; southern terminus of Bus. US 131
Mecosta	Green Charter Township	142.968	230.085	142	Bus. US 131 south – Big Rapids B-96 west (19 Mile Road)	Signed as B-96 only northbound; northern terminus of Bus. US 131; eastern terminus of B-96
Osceola	Richmond Township	153.126	246.432	153	US 10 – Ludington, Clare	
Osceola	Lincoln Township	159.226	256.249	159	11 Mile Road – Ashton	
Osceola	Le Roy Township	162.326	261.238	162	14 Mile Road	
Osceola	Burdell Township	168.423	271.051	168	20 Mile Road	
Wexford	Clam Lake Township	176.467	283.996	176	M-115 / M-55 west – Manistee, Frankfort, Clare	Southern end of M-55 concurrency
Wexford	Clam Lake Township	177.733	286.034	177	Bus. US 131 north (Mitchell Street)	Signed as Mitchell Street only southbound; southern terminus of Bus. US 131
Wexford	Cadillac–Haring Township line	180.970	291.243	180	M-55 east – Lake City	Northern end of M-55 concurrency
Wexford	Haring Township	182.940	294.413	183	Bus. US 131 south (Boon Road) – Cadillac	Signed as Boon Road only northbound; northern terminus of Bus. US 131
Wexford	Cedar Creek Township	191.870	308.785	191	Bus. US 131 north / M-42 – Lake City, Manton	Signed as M-42 only southbound; southern terminus of Bus. US 131
Wexford	Liberty Township	196.370	316.027	Northern end of freeway		
Wexford	Liberty Township	196.564	316.339		Bus. US 131 south – Manton	Northern terminus of Bus. US 131
Grand Traverse	Fife Lake Township	200.719	323.026		M-113 west – Kingsley	Eastern terminus of M-113
Grand Traverse	Fife Lake	204.703	329.438		M-186 west	Eastern terminus of M-186
Kalkaska	Kalkaska Township	217.863	350.617		M-66 south / M-72 east – Lake City, Grayling	Southern end of M-66/M-72 concurrency
Kalkaska	Kalkaska	219.867	353.842		M-72 west – Traverse City	Northern end of M-72 concurrency
Antrim	Mancelona	232.463	374.113		M-88 west – Bellaire C-38 east (Mancelona Road) – Gaylord	Eastern terminus of M-88; western terminus of C-38
Antrim	Mancelona Township	233.267	375.407		M-66 north – East Jordan, Charlevoix	Northern end of M-66 concurrency
Antrim	Alba	239.168	384.904		C-42 east (Alba Road) – Gaylord	Eastern terminus of C-42
Antrim	Warner Township	246.684– 247.244	396.999– 397.901		M-32 – East Jordan, Gaylord	Short concurrency with M-32
Charlevoix	Boyne Falls	254.759	409.995		M-75 north / C-48 west – Boyne City	Southern end of C-48 concurrency; southern terminus of M-75
Charlevoix	Boyne Valley Township	254.974	410.341		C-48 east	Northern end of C-48 concurrency
Charlevoix	Walloon Lake	261.489	420.826		M-75 south – Walloon Lake, Boyne City C-81 north	Northern terminus of M-75; southern terminus of C-81
Emmet	Petoskey	269.313	433.417		US 31 / LMCT – Charlevoix, Mackinaw City	Northern terminus; highway continues as US 31/LMCT
1.000 mi = 1.609 km; 1.000 km = 0.621 mi: Concurrency terminus; Incomplete access

== See also ==
- Business routes of U.S. Route 131
