= M-216 (Michigan highway) =

State highway in Cass and St. Joseph counties in Michigan, United States

M-216
- M-216 highlighted in red

Route information
- Maintained by MDOT
- Length: 9.379 mi (15.094 km)
- Existed: 1935–present

Major junctions
- West end: M-40 in Marcellus
- East end: US 131 near Moorepark

Location
- Country: United States
- State: Michigan
- Counties: Cass, St. Joseph

Highway system
- Michigan State Trunkline Highway System; Interstate; US; State; Byways
| ← M-214 | → M-217 |

M-216 is a state trunkline highway in the US state of Michigan that serves as a connector route between M-40 at Marcellus and US Highway 131 (US 131). The highway runs through a rural area of the southwestern part of the state. It has been a part of the highway system since 1935; the current form of the roadway was finalized in 1939. Between 2,400 and 3,900 vehicles use the highway each day on average.

== Route description ==
M-216 begins at a junction with M-40 in the village of Marcellus to the southwest of Kalamazoo. The highway follows Main Street eastward in the village, crossing a branch line of the Canadian National Railway. East of town, M-216 passes through farm fields and jogs to the south around Lewis Lake. The highway runs along Marcellus Road through the rural landscape that is a mix of farm fields and woods. The trunkline crosses the Cass – St. Joseph county line before running through the unincorporated community of Howardsville in Flowerfield Township. After passing by the Pine View Golf Club, the road comes to its end at US 131.

The Michigan Department of Transportation (MDOT) maintains M-216 like other state highways in Michigan. As a part of these maintenance responsibilities, the department tracks the volume of traffic that uses the roadways under its jurisdiction. These volumes are expressed using a metric called annual average daily traffic, which is a statistical calculation of the average daily number of vehicles on a segment of roadway. MDOT's surveys in 2009 showed that the highest traffic levels along M-216 were the 3,853 vehicles daily in the village of Marcellus; the lowest counts were the 2,421 vehicles immediately east of town.

== History ==
M-216 has existed in its current location since its creation in 1935. Two sets of changes to the roadway were made in the late 1930s. The first came in late 1938 when a new 0.7-mile (1.1 km) long segment was newly built to replace an 0.9-mile (1.4 km) segment which contained sharp turns. In 1939, the road paving was completed. Since then, the road has existed on its current alignment.

== Major intersections ==
| County | Location | mi | km | Destinations | Notes |
|---|---|---|---|---|---|
| Cass | Marcellus | 0.000 | 0.000 | M-40 – Paw Paw | |
| St. Joseph | Park Township | 9.379 | 15.094 | US 131 – Three Rivers, Kalamazoo | |
1.000 mi = 1.609 km; 1.000 km = 0.621 mi
