= Wayland Township, Michigan =

- Township
- Location within the state of Michigan
- Coordinates: 42°38′13″N 85°36′20″W
- Country: United States
- State: Michigan
- County: Allegan

Area
  - Total: 33.4 sq mi (86.6 km^{2})
  - Land: 32.6 sq mi (84.5 km^{2})
  - Water: 0.81 sq mi (2.1 km^{2})
- Elevation: 764 ft (233 m)

Population (2020)
  - Total: 3,573
  - Density: 110/sq mi (42.3/km^{2})
- Time zone: UTC-5 (Eastern (EST))
  - Summer (DST): UTC-4 (EDT)
- ZIP code: 49311 (Bradley P.O. Box), 49344 (Shelbyville), 49348 (Wayland)
- Area code: 269
- FIPS code: 26-84900
- GNIS feature ID: 1627232
- Website: www.waytwp.org

Wayland Township is a civil township of Allegan County in the U.S. state of Michigan. The population was 3,573 at the 2020 census.

== Communities ==
Bradley is an unincorporated community situated just east of exit 61 off U.S. Highway 131 at 42°37′49″N 85°38′5″W. The Bradley ZIP code 49311 provides P.O. only service. It was founded in 1854 due to the building of a plank road in the area.

Coyville was a rural post office in the township from 1857 until 1859.

Shelbyville is a small unincorporated community in the south of the township on the boundary with Martin Township at 42°35′39″N 85°38′14″W. The Shelbyville ZIP code 49344 serves the southern portion of Wayland Township as well as parts of northern Martin Township, a small area of eastern Hopkins Township and part of northeast Orangeville Township in Barry County.

The city of Wayland is at the northwest corner of the township, and is administratively autonomous. The Wayland ZIP code 49348 also serves the northern portion of Wayland Township.

== Geography ==
According to the United States Census Bureau, the township has a total area of 33.4 square miles (86.6 km^{2}), of which 32.6 square miles (84.5 km^{2}) is land and 0.81 square miles (2.1 km^{2}), or 2.43%, is water. The Rabbit River loops through the north of the township from the northeast to northwest corners. The southern portion is dotted with numerous small lakes. The extreme southeast corner touches on Gun Lake.

== Demographics ==
As of the census of 2000, there were 3,013 people, 1,053 households, and 824 families residing in the township. The population density was 92.0 inhabitants per square mile (35.5/km^{2}). There were 1,169 housing units at an average density of 35.7 per square mile (13.8/km^{2}). The racial makeup of the township was 96.45% White, 0.40% African American, 1.46% Native American, 0.30% Asian, 0.80% from other races, and 0.60% from two or more races. Hispanic or Latino of any race were 2.19% of the population.

There were 1,053 households, out of which 41.6% had children under the age of 18 living with them, 66.3% were married couples living together, 6.8% had a female householder with no husband present, and 21.7% were non-families. 16.5% of all households were made up of individuals, and 5.5% had someone living alone who was 65 years of age or older. The average household size was 2.83 and the average family size was 3.15.

In the township the population was spread out, with 29.8% under the age of 18, 7.2% from 18 to 24, 32.3% from 25 to 44, 22.1% from 45 to 64, and 8.6% who were 65 years of age or older. The median age was 35 years. For every 100 females, there were 109.7 males. For every 100 females age 18 and over, there were 104.8 males.

The median income for a household in the township was $46,853, and the median income for a family was $49,675. Males had a median income of $38,381 versus $26,400 for females. The per capita income for the township was $18,870. About 0.5% of families and 2.8% of the population were below the poverty line, including 0.5% of those under age 18 and 3.0% of those age 65 or over.
