= M-89 (Michigan highway) =

State highway in Michigan, United States

M-89
- M-89 highlighted in red

Route information
- Maintained by MDOT
- Length: 61.153 mi (98.416 km)
- Existed: c. July 1, 1919–present

Major junctions
- West end: I-196 / US 31 near Ganges
- M-40 in Allegan; US 131 in Plainwell; M-43 in Richland; M-37 in Battle Creek
- East end: BL I-94 in Battle Creek

Location
- Country: United States
- State: Michigan
- Counties: Allegan, Barry, Kalamazoo, Calhoun

Highway system
- Michigan State Trunkline Highway System; Interstate; US; State; Byways
← M-88	→ M-90

M-89 is an east–west state trunkline highway in the US state of Michigan that runs from near Ganges to Battle Creek. M-89 starts at an interchange with Interstate 196/US Highway 31 (I-196/US 31) and passes through Allegan, Kalamazoo County, Michigan, and Calhoun counties. The highway also briefly crosses the southwest corner of Barry County before it terminates an at intersection with Business Loop I-94 (BL I-94) on the northwestern side of downtown Battle Creek. In between the trunkline runs parallel to the Kalamazoo River through rural southwestern Michigan farmlands while also running through the middle of several smaller towns in the area.

Dating back to 1919, M-89 was originally just a segment of the current highway between the Ganges area and Martin. Changes through the 1920s and 1930s moved the eastern end to Calhoun County. The last section was paved in the 1950s before the highway was rerouted in the Allegan, Michigan area. The last extensions into Battle Creek came in the 1960s and 1998.

== Route description ==
M-89 begins at an interchange with I-196/US 31 near Ganges, just a half mile (0.8 km) from Lake Michigan. The highway travels east on 124th Street from there through farmlands and small communities like Fennville. The trunkline passes wetlands just north of Swan Creek Marsh and crosses the Kalamazoo River about two miles (3.2 km) west of an intersection with M-40. M-89 and M-40 run concurrently to the southeast for 6.5 miles (10.5 km) through more farms and across Lake Allegan on the Kalamazoo River on the way into Allegan. Just two blocks before M-89 splits from M-40, the concurrent highways have a junction with M-222. After M-89 splits from M-40, it continues out of Allegan to the southeast, again crossing over the Kalamazoo River.

After leaving Allegan, M-89 runs roughly parallel with the Kalamazoo River for approximately 12 miles (19 km), passing through mostly rural areas with residences and agricultural fields. The highway curves to the east and crosses the Kalamazoo River again just west of the city of Otsego. The trunkline curves to the south in the city then again runs east to junction with US 131/M-43 at exit 49 on the west side of Plainwell. At this interchange, the M-43 designation transfers from the freeway to run concurrently with M-89 eastward. After the freeway, M-43/M-89 passes through the city of Plainwell and crosses the Kalamazoo River again before continuing into rural areas again. The trunkline continues to the southeast on towards the village of Richland.

Just north of Richland, M-89 parts ways with M-43. M-89 heads south through town and intersects M-343, before turning eastward and passing to the south of Gull Lake. After passing the lake, the highway turns southeast towards Battle Creek. As M-89 begins to enter the outskirts of Battle Creek it follows Michigan Avenue. It passes through the neighborhoods of Level Park-Oak Park and Urbandale, the first residential areas of the city. As the highway continues towards Battle Creek it has a junction with M-37. M-89 continues on Michigan Avenue until an intersection with Washington Avenue where the route turns to the southwest where it crosses the Kalamazoo River one last time. The trunkline terminates a few blocks later at Dickman Road, otherwise known as the Business Loop I-94 (BL I-94).

M-89 is maintained by the Michigan Department of Transportation (MDOT) like other state highways in Michigan. As a part of these maintenance responsibilities, the department tracks the volume of traffic that uses the roadways under its jurisdiction. These volumes are expressed using a metric called annual average daily traffic, which is a statistical calculation of the average daily number of vehicles on a segment of roadway. MDOT's surveys in 2010 showed that the highest traffic levels along M-89 were the 26,470 vehicles daily between Otsego and Plainwell; the lowest counts were the 2,879 vehicles per day between Fennville and the I-196/US 31 interchange. No section of M-89 has been listed on the National Highway System, a network of roads important to the country's economy, defense, and mobility.

== History ==
The July 1, 1919, incarnation of M-89 was much shorter relative to today's road. Its western terminus was at a junction with M-11 (later US 31, now A-2) near Ganges. It traveled east to Fennville then turned south to Pearl before turning back to the east towards Allegan on an alignment that is a few miles south of the present day configuration. The highway then left Allegan on present day M-222 and terminated at M-13, which is now A-45 east of the US 131 freeway.

In 1926, when M-40 was extended, M-89 was rerouted out of Allegan to the southeast along its present-day alignment to terminate at US 131 in Plainwell. Just a few years later, the road was extended further to the southeast to Richland then east along its present-day routing to end at M-96 in Augusta. In 1931, the route was realigned to run east, rather than south into Augusta, where it then met up with M-96 just inside the Calhoun County line. The road remained in this fashion for the next 20 years.

In late 1951 or early 1952, the last section of M-89 was paved, a segment south and east of Fennville in Allegan County. Just months later, the highways was realigned to run east from Fennville, rather than south to Pearl, to intersect M-40. From there it was rerouted to run concurrently into Allegan.

In 1963, when the I-196/US 31 freeway opened, the western terminus of M-89 was extended to meet the new freeway. A few years later, when M-96 was realigned onto a route that took it into Battle Creek, M-89 was extended southeasterly along Michigan Avenue (the old M-96) and terminated at M-37. The highway was extended further southeasterly into Battle Creek to replace the old routing of M-37 along Michigan Avenue; it then turned south on Washington to the BL I-94 where it terminated, thus bringing the route to its current alignment.

The City of Kalamazoo accepted jurisdiction of the trunklines within the city's downtown from MDOT in January 2019; M-43 was rerouted out of the city as a result. After the change, M-43 ran concurrently along M-89 between Plainwell and Richland instead of overlapping M-89 within Richland.

== Major intersections ==
County	Location	mi	km	Destinations	Notes
Allegan	Saugatuck–Ganges township line	0.000– 0.262	0.000– 0.422	I-196 / US 31 / LMCT – Benton Harbor, Holland, Grand Rapids	Exit 34 on I-196/US 31
Allegan	Saugatuck–Ganges township line	0.592	0.953	A-2 (Blue Star Highway/68th Street) – Saugatuck, Ganges	
Allegan	Heath–Valley township line	14.398	23.171	M-40 north – Holland	Western end of M-40 concurrency
Allegan	Allegan	20.843	33.544	M-222 east – Martin	Western terminus of M-222
Allegan	Allegan	21.011	33.814	M-40 south – Paw Paw	Eastern end of M-40 concurrency
Allegan	Plainwell	33.169– 33.184	53.380– 53.404	US 131 / M-43 west – Kalamazoo, Grand Rapids	Western end of M-43 concurrency; exit 49 on US 131
Allegan	Plainwell	34.037	54.777	A-45 – Kalamazoo, Grand Rapids	Former routing of US 131
Barry	No major junctions				
Kalamazoo	Richland Township	44.884	72.234	M-43 north – Lansing	Eastern end of M-43 concurrency
Kalamazoo	Richland	45.885	73.845	M-343 west – Kalamazoo	Eastern terminus of M-343
Calhoun	Battle Creek	58.191	93.649	M-37 – Springfield, Hastings	
Calhoun	Battle Creek	61.153	98.416	BL I-94 – Marshall, Kalamazoo	
1.000 mi = 1.609 km; 1.000 km = 0.621 mi: Concurrency terminus
