= Blood Brothers Machine Company =

Blood Brothers Machine Company was a universal joint manufacturing firm with factories in Allegan and Kalamazoo, Michigan.

Maurice, Clarence and Charles Blood and their nephew Howard Blood started a bicycle factory in Kalamazoo in the early 1900s. In 1914, the Blood Brothers purchased the Allegan Mirror Company and ventured into the racing car industry with the production of the unique chain drive Cornelian, one of which was driven by Louis Chevrolet in the 1915 Indy 500 race. Fewer than 100 of these vehicles were produced.

The company turned its Allegan operation into Blood Brothers Machine Company. In 1936 the company became a wholly owned subsidiary of the Standard Steel Spring Company of Coraopolis, Pennsylvania.

In 1975, it in turn became part of the Rockwell International operation. Rockwell was in the business of building aircraft for the US Air Force.

In 1945, Blood Brothers started up what is now Allegan Federal Community Credit Union, originally monikered Blood Brothers Federal Credit Union. Rockwell closed down the Allegan plant in 1991.

== Other Resources ==
James J. Green, From Blood Brothers Machine Company to Rockwell International (Allegan: Allegan Historical County Society, 1978).
