= M-40 (Michigan highway) =

State highway in Cass, Van Buren, and Allegan counties in Michigan, United States

M-40
- M-40 highlighted in red

Route information
- Maintained by MDOT
- Length: 74.266 mi (119.520 km)
- Existed: c. July 1, 1919–present

Major junctions
- South end: US 12 in Porter Township
- M-60 in Newberg Township; M-216 in Marcellus; I-94 near Paw Paw; M-43 near Gobles; M-89 in Allegan; I-196 in Holland
- North end: BL I-196 / US 31 in Holland

Location
- Country: United States
- State: Michigan
- Counties: Cass, Van Buren, Allegan

Highway system
- Michigan State Trunkline Highway System; Interstate; US; State; Byways
← M-39	→ US 41

M-40 is a north–south state trunkline highway in the Lower Peninsula of the US state of Michigan. The highway runs from US Highway 12 (US 12) near the Indiana state line in Porter Township north through Paw Paw and Allegan to end in the outskirts of Holland. The current northern end is near Interstate 196 (I-196) at an intersection with US 31/Business Loop I-196 (BL 196). In between, M-40 runs through mixed agricultural and forest lands and along lakes and rivers through Southwest Michigan.

The trunkline was designated by July 1, 1919, along with the rest of the original state highway system along a route that is different to that of the 21st century. South of Paw Paw, the original M-40 reached Niles and even the Indiana state line for a time. The northern end was extended in stages to Holland. The southern end was shifted in the 1970s, resulting in the modern routing.

== Route description ==
M-40 starts at an intersection with US 12 in rural Cass County. Running north through farm fields, the highway rounds Bar Lake and into the community of Jones. The area around Jones has a few more lakes in a wooded setting. As the trunkline continues north, it passes back into farm lands. The road curves around to the northwest as it passes between Bogart Lake and Streeters Mill Pond near Dutch Settlement Road. M-40 follows Centre Street into Marcellus. When the highway meets the western end of M-216 in town, M-40 turns west along Main Street and runs out of town. The roadway returns to a northerly course, and later it curves northwesterly again near Cedar Lake near the Van Buren County line.

Continuing north, the trunkline passes through mixed agricultural and wood lands into the community of Lawton. M-40 follows Main Street through town and exits on a northwestern track towards the village of Paw Paw. M-40 crosses over I-94 and turns north into town running along Maple Lake. The highway crosses the narrow isthmus between the larger Maple Lake and the smaller Ackley Lake, passing through some small residential subdivisions as it leaves Paw Paw. Small farms dot the landscape as M-40 crosses M-43 in a rural area of the county on the way to Gobles. It is in this small city that the road crosses the Kal-Haven Trail State Park, a linear park that follows the former Kalamazoo and South Haven Railroad line. The rail line was converted into a rail trail and allows users to bike, hike or snowmobile between Kalamazoo and South Haven.

M-40 crosses into Allegan County near Base Line Lake. The highway follows Jenner Street along some curves near the banks of the Kalamazoo River as the trunkline enters the south side of Allegan. M-40 meets M-89, and the two highways run concurrently into downtown together on Cedar Street. At the intersection with Cutler Street, M-40/M-89 meets the western end of M-222 and M-40/M-89 turns west onto Cutler Street. The street name changes to Western Avenue as M-40/M-89 curves north and northwest, crossing the Kalamazoo River and leaving town. North of Lake Allegan, M-89 separates and runs west toward Fennville, and M-40 extends to Hamilton, crossing the Rabbit River. The highway runs through more farms and approaches the outskirts of Holland. The trunkline crosses over I-196 and follows Lincoln Road through an industrial area on the southeast side of town. At 48th Street, the highway turns west until meeting Lincoln Avenue. There, M-40 turns north for several blocks before ending at the intersection with BL I-196/US 31.

== History ==
When M-40 was created around by July 1, 1919, it originally ran from Niles to Dowagiac and Decatur roughly along the current path of M-51. Then it traveled to the northeast where it entered Paw Paw and continued north to Allegan. M-40 is shown on a commercial 1921 map extending south of Niles to the Indiana state line, the segment used for the routing of US 31 starting in 1926, but not shown extending to Allegan. A section of the highway was realigned in the same time period near Paw Paw; after the change, M-40 followed the contemporary US 12 instead of Paw Paw Road. A rerouting of M-89 in 1927 shifted it to run from Allegan southeast to Plainwell instead of east to Martin; M-40 replaced M-89 on the Allegan–Martin roadway. In 1929, the routing from Allegan to Martin was removed and renumbered M-118, and M-40 was extended to the north out of Allegan along M-89 and its modern routing to a new terminus in Holland ending at US 31. The last segment of unpaved highway was paved in late 1945 or early 1946. This segment was near Dunningville in central Allegan County.

In late 1960 or early 1961, when the I-94 freeway was completed in Van Buren County, M-40 moved to the new freeway for four miles (6.4 km), between present day exits 56 and 60, and the former route along old US 12 was returned to local control. In late 1971, all of M-40 south of I-94 was reassigned the designation M-51 while M-40 was shifted to the east to take over the routing of the contemporary M-119 between Paw Paw and its intersection with US 12 in Porter Township near Mottville; the change was made in order to give M-40 "north-south continuity" and to remove M-40 markers from I-94. In 1994, the northern terminus was scaled back from the US 31 business loop to its present terminus at US 31 on the southeast side of Holland.

Local officials in Allegan have proposed creation of a truck route around the town. Concerned about the traffic and noise, residents have formed the Citizens for a Safer Community. They cite reports that show that the accident rates in town are higher than the statewide average. The group and local officials are proposing using 24th Street, 118th Avenue and Babylon Road for truck traffic. MDOT would require permits to erect the signs needed for the truck route. The department has indicated that the bypass would not be a state highway. MDOT will not take ownership of the roads needed for the truck route, but overall the department is supportive of the city's efforts to make the downtown area more pedestrian friendly.

== Major intersections ==
County	Location	mi	km	Destinations	Notes
Cass	Porter Township	0.000	0.000	US 12 – Niles, Sturgis	
Cass	Newberg Township	6.813	10.964	M-60 – Cassopolis, Three Rivers	
Cass	Marcellus	15.578	25.070	M-216 east	
Van Buren	Paw Paw	30.036	48.338	I-94 – Chicago, Detroit	Exit 60 on I-94
Van Buren	Waverly–Almena township line	36.880	59.353	M-43 – South Haven, Kalamazoo	
Allegan	Allegan	53.001	85.297	M-89 east – Plainwell	Eastern end of M-89 concurrency
Allegan	Allegan	53.169	85.567	M-222 east – Martin	
Allegan	Valley Township	59.614	95.939	M-89 west – Fennville	Western end of M-89 concurrency
Allegan	Heath Township	62.228	100.146	A-42 east – Hopkins	
Allegan	Holland	72.193	116.183	I-196 (G.R. Ford Freeway) – Benton Harbor, Grand Rapids	Exit 49 on I-196
Allegan	Holland	74.266	119.520	BL I-196 / US 31 / LMCT – Niles, Grand Haven	
1.000 mi = 1.609 km; 1.000 km = 0.621 mi: Concurrency terminus
