= Cornelian automobile =

The Cornelian was a 1914 American automobile built expressly for racing. It had chain drive and was the smallest such configuration to be raced at the Indianapolis Speedway.

== Manufacture ==
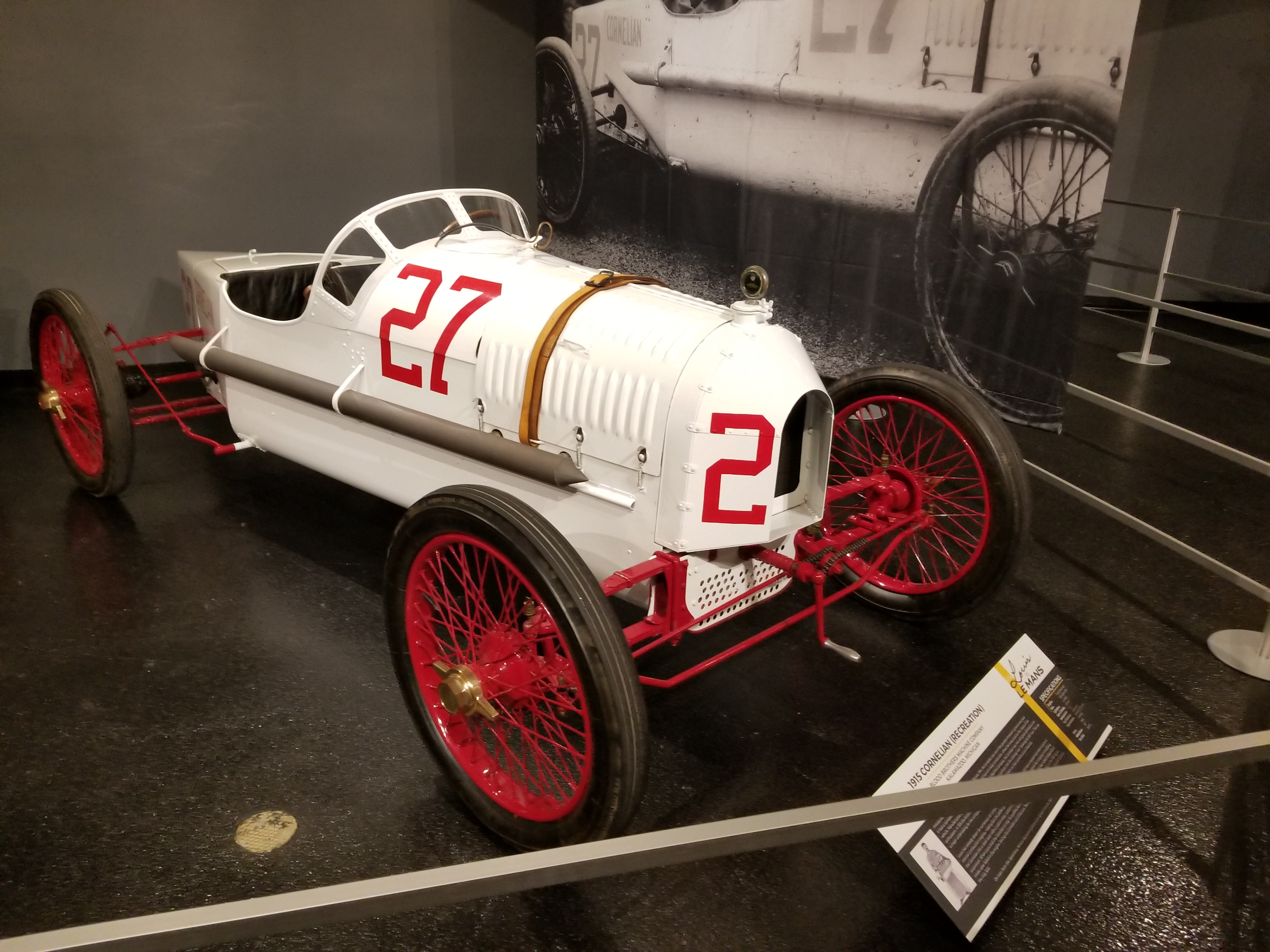
1915 Cornelian replica

The 1914 Cornelian was manufactured by Howard E. Blood (of the Allegan, Michigan-based Blood Brothers Machine Company), who had partnered with Swiss racecar driver Louis Chevrolet. Chevrolet used a Cornelian to qualify for the 1915 Indy 500 race, with a qualifying speed of 81.01 mph (130.373 km/h). Chevrolet did not finish the race, having to drop out on the 77th lap when an engine valve failed (he placed 20th in the results). The appearance was still good for business, and orders came into Blood's office. However, only a few units had been produced when Blood halted production.

The car was powered by a four-cylinder Sterling engine displacing 103 cubic inches (1.7 L). The automobile body was monocoque; the rear wheels had independent suspension, and the front wheels were mounted on a Transverse leaf spring front suspension with a solid axle.

The Museum of American Speed has one of these vehicles on display.
