= Martin Township, Michigan =

- Township
- Location within the state of Michigan
- Coordinates: 42°33′10″N 85°36′26″W
- Country: United States
- State: Michigan
- County: Allegan

Area
  - Total: 36.0 sq mi (93.2 km^{2})
  - Land: 35.5 sq mi (92.0 km^{2})
  - Water: 0.42 sq mi (1.1 km^{2})
- Elevation: 774 ft (236 m)

Population (2020)
  - Total: 2,723
  - Density: 76.7/sq mi (29.6/km^{2})
- Time zone: UTC-5 (Eastern (EST))
  - Summer (DST): UTC-4 (EDT)
- ZIP code: 49070 (Martin), 49080 (Plainwell), 49344 (Shelbyville)
- Area code: 269
- FIPS code: 26-52000
- GNIS feature ID: 1626701
- Website: www.martintownship.org

Martin Township is a civil township of Allegan County in the U.S. state of Michigan. The population was 2,723 at the 2020 census.

== Communities ==
The village of Martin is within the township. The Martin ZIP code 49070 serves a large portion of Martin Township.

The city of Plainwell is to the south, and the Plainwell ZIP code 49080 also serves the southeast corner of Martin Township.

Shelbyville is a small unincorporated community in the north of the township on the boundary with Wayland Township. The Shelbyville ZIP code 49344 also serves parts of northern Martin Township.

== Geography ==
According to the United States Census Bureau, the township has a total area of 36.0 square miles (93.2 km^{2}), of which 35.5 square miles (92.0 km^{2}) is land and 0.42 square miles (1.1 km^{2}), or 1.22%, is water.

== Demographics ==
Historical population
Census	Pop.	Note	%±
1960	1,963		—
1970	2,125		8.3%
1980	2,331		9.7%
1990	2,487		6.7%
2000	2,514		1.1%
2010	2,629		4.6%
2020	2,723		3.6%
Source: Census Bureau. Census 1960- 2000, 2010.

As of the census of 2000, there were 2,514 people, 891 households, and 686 families residing in the township. The population density was 70.5 inhabitants per square mile (27.2/km^{2}). There were 935 housing units at an average density of 26.2 per square mile (10.1/km^{2}). The racial makeup of the township was 96.78% White, 0.16% African American, 0.32% Native American, 0.64% Asian, 1.11% from other races, and 0.99% from two or more races. Hispanic or Latino of any race were 2.11% of the population.

There were 891 households, out of which 36.8% had children under the age of 18 living with them, 65.9% were married couples living together, 7.0% had a female householder with no husband present, and 22.9% were non-families. 19.0% of all households were made up of individuals, and 7.6% had someone living alone who was 65 years of age or older. The average household size was 2.79 and the average family size was 3.18.

In the township the population was spread out, with 29.0% under the age of 18, 8.2% from 18 to 24, 28.4% from 25 to 44, 22.6% from 45 to 64, and 11.8% who were 65 years of age or older. The median age was 35 years. For every 100 females, there were 100.3 males. For every 100 females age 18 and over, there were 100.6 males.

The median income for a household in the township was $40,565, and the median income for a family was $45,595. Males had a median income of $37,279 versus $26,471 for females. The per capita income for the township was $17,233. About 5.5% of families and 8.4% of the population were below the poverty line, including 12.1% of those under age 18 and 3.0% of those age 65 or over.
