= Park Township, St. Joseph County, Michigan =

Civil township in the state of Michigan, United States

Park Township, Michigan
- Township
- Location within the state of Michigan Park Township, Michigan (the United States)
- Coordinates: 42°1′22″N 85°34′49″W
- Country: United States
- State: Michigan
- County: St. Joseph
- Organized: 1838

Area
  - Total: 35.8 sq mi (92.7 km^{2})
  - Land: 35.1 sq mi (90.9 km^{2})
  - Water: 0.66 sq mi (1.7 km^{2})
- Elevation: 837 ft (255 m)

Population (2020)
  - Total: 2,397
  - Density: 68.3/sq mi (26.4/km^{2})
- Time zone: UTC-5 (Eastern (EST))
  - Summer (DST): UTC-4 (EDT)
- FIPS code: 26-62480
- GNIS feature ID: 1626883
- Website: Township website

Park Township is a civil township of St. Joseph County in the U.S. state of Michigan. The population was 2,397 at the 2020 census.

The township was originally part of Flowerfield Township and was set off as a separate township in 1838.

== Communities ==
- Fishers Lake was a settlement established in 1834.

== Geography ==
According to the United States Census Bureau, the township has a total area of 35.8 square miles (92.7 km^{2}), of which 35.1 square miles (90.9 km^{2}) is land and 0.7 square mile (1.7 km^{2}) (1.87%) is water.

== Demographics ==
As of the census of 2000, there were 2,699 people, 996 households, and 769 families residing in the township. The population density was 76.9 inhabitants per square mile (29.7/km^{2}). There were 1,131 housing units at an average density of 32.2 per square mile (12.4/km^{2}). The racial makeup of the township was 94.00% White, 2.37% African American, 0.48% Native American, 0.52% Asian, 0.67% from other races, and 1.96% from two or more races. Hispanic or Latino of any race were 2.19% of the population.

There were 996 households, out of which 31.0% had children under the age of 18 living with them, 65.9% were married couples living together, 7.4% had a female householder with no husband present, and 22.7% were non-families. 18.2% of all households were made up of individuals, and 7.3% had someone living alone who was 65 years of age or older. The average household size was 2.63 and the average family size was 2.95.

In the township the population was spread out, with 24.5% under the age of 18, 6.3% from 18 to 24, 27.1% from 25 to 44, 25.9% from 45 to 64, and 16.2% who were 65 years of age or older. The median age was 40 years. For every 100 females, there were 98.5 males. For every 100 females age 18 and over, there were 96.6 males.

The median income for a household in the township was $48,173, and the median income for a family was $51,425. Males had a median income of $39,632 versus $26,806 for females. The per capita income for the township was $21,045. About 5.0% of families and 7.4% of the population were below the poverty line, including 12.1% of those under age 18 and 2.1% of those age 65 or over.
