= Martin, Michigan =

- Village
- Location of Martin, Michigan
- Coordinates: 42°32′14″N 85°38′15″W
- Country: United States
- State: Michigan
- County: Allegan
- Township: Martin

Area
  - Total: 0.76 sq mi (1.98 km^{2})
  - Land: 0.76 sq mi (1.98 km^{2})
  - Water: 0 sq mi (0.00 km^{2})
- Elevation: 830 ft (253 m)

Population (2020)
  - Total: 377
  - Density: 492.0/sq mi (189.96/km^{2})
- Time zone: UTC-5 (Eastern (EST))
  - Summer (DST): UTC-4 (EDT)
- ZIP code: 49070
- Area code: 269
- FIPS code: 26-51980
- GNIS feature ID: 0631648
- Website: villageofmartinmi.org

Martin is a village in southeastern Allegan County in the U.S. state of Michigan. The population was 377 at the 2020 census.

== Geography ==
According to the United States Census Bureau, the village has a total area of 0.78 square miles (2.02 km^{2}), all land.

== Demographics ==
Historical population
Census	Pop.	Note	%±
1950	407		—
1960	483		18.7%
1970	502		3.9%
1980	447		−11.0%
1990	462		3.4%
2000	435		−5.8%
2010	410		−5.7%
2020	377		−8.0%
U.S. Decennial Census

=== 2010 census ===
As of the census of 2010, there were 410 people, 162 households, and 109 families living in the village. The population density was 525.6 inhabitants per square mile (202.9/km^{2}). There were 176 housing units at an average density of 225.6 per square mile (87.1/km^{2}). The racial makeup of the village was 92.9% White, 1.0% African American, 2.9% from other races, and 3.2% from two or more races. Hispanic or Latino of any race were 5.9% of the population.

There were 162 households, of which 31.5% had children under the age of 18 living with them, 52.5% were married couples living together, 10.5% had a female householder with no husband present, 4.3% had a male householder with no wife present, and 32.7% were non-families. 27.8% of all households were made up of individuals, and 10.5% had someone living alone who was 65 years of age or older. The average household size was 2.53 and the average family size was 3.06.

The median age in the village was 37.8 years. 24.9% of residents were under the age of 18; 11% were between the ages of 18 and 24; 23.8% were from 25 to 44; 26.9% were from 45 to 64; and 13.4% were 65 years of age or older. The gender makeup of the village was 50.7% male and 49.3% female.

=== 2000 census ===
As of the census of 2000, there were 435 people, 172 households, and 126 families living in the village. The population density was 497.3 inhabitants per square mile (192.0/km^{2}). There were 181 housing units at an average density of 206.9 per square mile (79.9/km^{2}). The racial makeup of the village was 95.86% White, 0.46% African American, 0.92% Native American, 0.46% Asian, 2.30% from other races. Hispanic or Latino of any race were 2.76% of the population.

There were 172 households, out of which 33.1% had children under the age of 18 living with them, 57.6% were married couples living together, 11.0% had a female householder with no husband present, and 26.2% were non-families. 21.5% of all households were made up of individuals, and 9.3% had someone living alone who was 65 years of age or older. The average household size was 2.53 and the average family size was 2.92.

In the village, the population was spread out, with 28.0% under the age of 18, 10.1% from 18 to 24, 26.2% from 25 to 44, 20.0% from 45 to 64, and 15.6% who were 65 years of age or older. The median age was 36 years. For every 100 females, there were 103.3 males. For every 100 females age 18 and over, there were 95.6 males.

The median income for a household in the village was $41,389, and the median income for a family was $48,958. Males had a median income of $40,000 versus $28,929 for females. The per capita income for the village was $16,238. About 6.4% of families and 9.6% of the population were below the poverty line, including 14.1% of those under age 18 and none of those age 65 or over.

== Points of interest ==
US-131 Motorsports Park, the site of the NHRA Mission Foods Drag Racing Series Great Lakes Nationals.
