= Plaster Creek =

River in Michigan, United States

Coordinates: 42°56′56″N 85°41′55″W

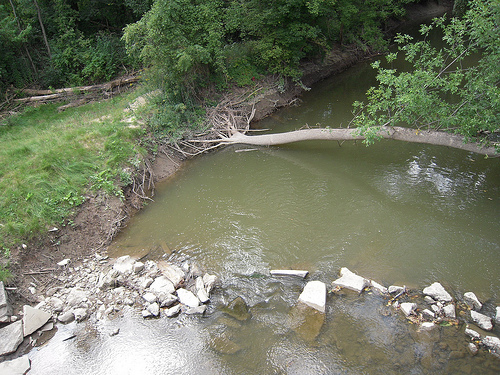
- Plaster Creek west of Kalamazoo Avenue

- Location of the mouth within Michigan

Location
- Country: United States
- State: Michigan
- County: Kent

Physical characteristics
- Source
  - location: Gaines Township, Kent County, Michigan
- Mouth
  - location: Grand River at Grand Rapids, Michigan
  - elevation: 581 ft (177 m)
- Length: 26 mi (42 km)
- Basin size: 57 sq mi (150 km^{2})
- Discharge
  - location: mouth
  - average: 66.42 cu ft/s (1.881 m^{3}/s) (estimate)

Plaster Creek is a 25.9-mile-long (41.7 km) urban stream in Kent County, Michigan in the United States. It is a tributary of the Grand River. The stream is named for the large deposit of gypsum found at its mouth. Its mean monthly flow averages 22 million gallons per day.

Two bridges listed on the National Register of Historic Places cross the creek.

== Watershed ==
The headwaters are located in Dutton Shadyside Park, at Hanna Lake Avenue and 76th Street, just south of the unincorporated town of Dutton in Gaines Township. The creek flows into the Grand River just south of Wealthy Street in downtown Grand Rapids. The main stream is approximately 26 miles (42 km) long and drains a 57-square-mile (150 km^{2}) basin.

The Plaster Creek Watershed is considered to contain one of the most polluted creeks in West Michigan. Priority pollutants of the creek can be linked to stormwater runoff but include issues such as sedimentation, E.coli contamination, nutrient pollution, thermal pollution and toxic substances. However, local groups such as The Lower Grand River Organization of Watersheds and Plaster Creek Stewards have worked to address these issues. "Plaster Creek Stewards is a collaboration of Calvin University faculty, staff, and students working with local schools, churches, and community partners to restore the health and beauty of the watershed".

== Flora and fauna ==
Plaster Creek is a salmon spawning stream, and salmon have been seen as far upstream as the headwaters at Dutton Shadyside Park. The stream is not considered to be a trout stream, but has been designated as a warm water fishery. One endangered species Epioblasma triquetra (the snuffbox mussel) lives in the Plaster Creek watershed. The threatened Beak Grass (Diarrhena americana) as well as Endangered Virginia Bluebells (Mertensia virginica) grows along the banks in some areas.

== Tributaries ==
Streams flowing into the creek include Little Plaster Creek, the small Maple Creek, Whiskey Creek, and the former Silver Creek, now culverted as the Silver Creek Drain.

== Trails ==
A series of trails along Plaster Creek is being planned in Grand Rapids:

Plaster Creek Trail - Phase I

Beginning at Ken-O-Sha Park School (1353 VanAuken SE) and following Plaster Creek, this pathway offers interpretive signs and a stunning display of spring-blooming wild flowers along the creek's bank and wetland areas. This portion of the Plaster Creek Trail is 1.2 miles (1.9 km).

Plaster Creek Trail - Phase II

The Plaster Creek extension is approximately 1.5 miles (2.4 km) in length. It starts at Plaster Creek and Eastern Avenue, travels north on the east side of Eastern Avenue, crosses 28th Street, then proceeds westerly to Division Avenue. The trail serves two purposes, as a non-motorized trail and as a flood protection and mitigation facility.

Plaster Creek Trail - Phase III

Division Avenue to Oxford Street.

Eventually, this trail will connect with Kent Trails and the Paul Henry-Thornapple Rail Trail.
