= Rabbit River (Michigan) =

Tributary of the Kalamazoo River

Coordinates: 42°38′58″N 86°05′16″W

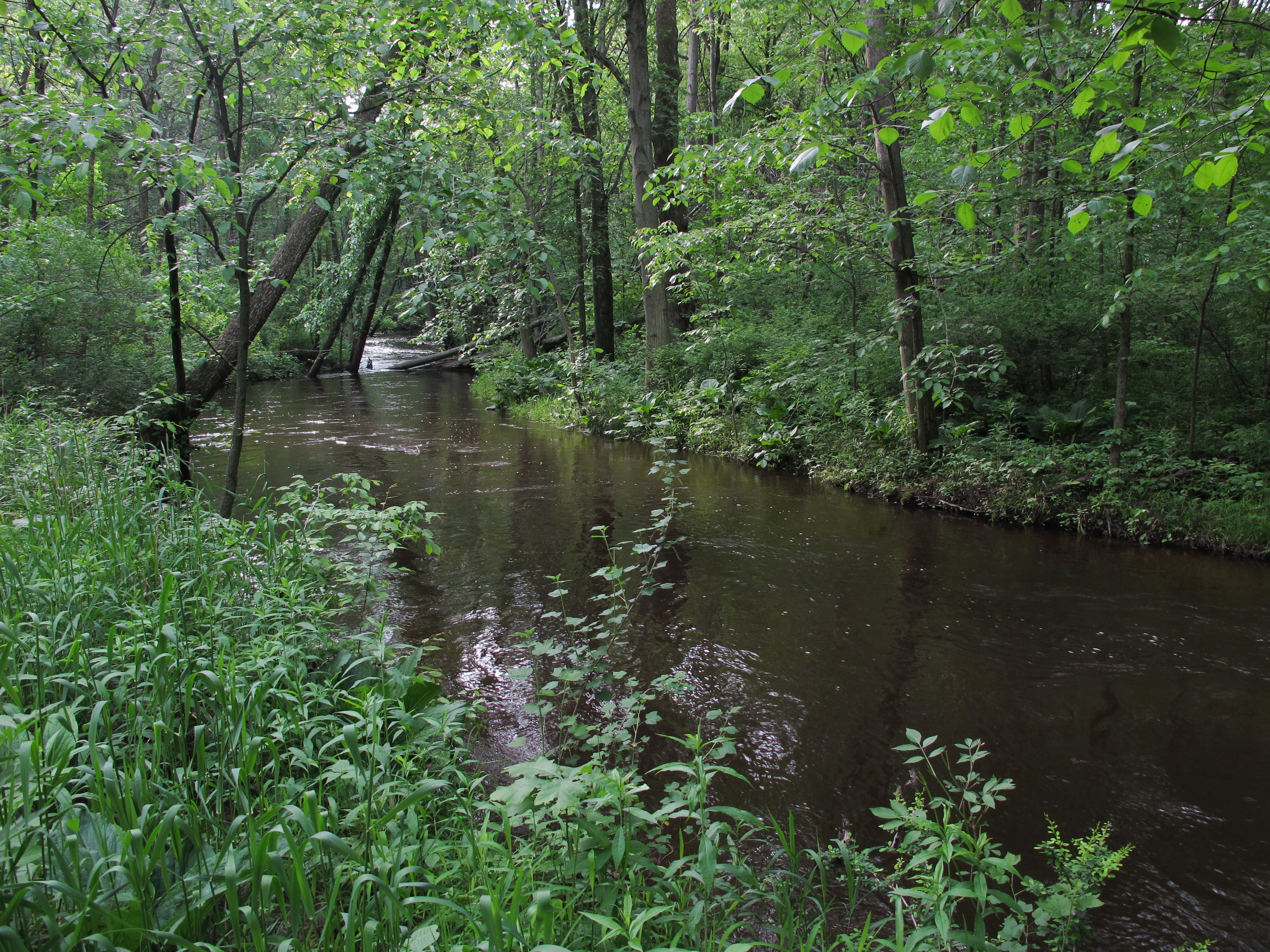
The Rabbit River in Wayland

The Rabbit River is a 62.1-mile-long (99.9 km) tributary of the Kalamazoo River within Allegan County in the U.S. state of Michigan. The river's watershed covers 187,200 acres (758 km^{2}) of land and drains most of north-central and northeast Allegan County as well as small portions of Barry, Kent and Ottawa counties.

The river rises in farmland in the southeast portion of Leighton Township and flows generally westward, traversing the northern portion of Wayland Township, the city of Wayland, the northern portion of Hopkins Township, the extreme southwest corner of Dorr Township, Salem Township, Overisel Township, Heath Township, Hamilton, and Manlius Township, where it merges with the Kalamazoo near New Richmond.

== Tributaries ==
Main tributaries are (from east to west):

- Green Lake Creek
- Buskirk Creek
- Miller Creek (Hopkins Township)
- Bear Creek
- Little Rabbit River
- Black Creek
- Miller Creek (Monterey Township)
- Silver Creek

The Little Rabbit River is an 11.0-mile-long (17.7 km) tributary of the Rabbit River, with a 30,850-acre (124.8 km^{2}) watershed that drains sections of four townships in Allegan and Kent counties: Byron Township in Kent County, and Leighton, Dorr and Salem townships in Allegan County. The upper reaches consist of two small branches: the Red Run Drain, which rises in the extreme western edge of Leighton Township just north of Moline and the Dorr & Byron Drain, which rises in the southern portion of Byron Township. The branches converge west of Dorr and then empty into the Rabbit River in southwest Salem Township.
