= Byron Center Public Schools =

School district in Michigan

Address
- 8542 Byron Center Ave SW Byron Center, Kent, Michigan, 49315; United States

District information
- Grades: PreK-12
- Superintendent: Kevin Macina
- Schools: 8
- Budget: US$95,316,000 (2022–2023 expenditures)
- NCES District ID: 2607560

Students and staff
- Students: 4,572 (2024–2025)
- Teachers: 227.8 FTE (2024–2025)
- Staff: 504.29 FTE (2024–2025)
- Student–teacher ratio: 20.07 (2024–2025)

Other information
- Website: www.bcpsk12.net

Byron Center Public Schools is a public school district in Kent County, Michigan in the Grand Rapids area. It serves Byron Center and part of Cutlerville and portions of Byron Township and Gaines Township.

== History ==
Byron Center High School was built in 1998 and expanded in 2020. The previous high school was located at 8638 Byron Center Ave SW and became Nickels Middle School and only a few years later Nickels Intermediate School and ultimately Heritage Elementary School. It replaced a building built in 1952.

== Schools ==
Schools in Byron Center Public Schools district
School	Address	Notes
Byron Center High School	8500 Burlingame SW, Byron Center	Grades 9–12. Opened fall 1998.
West Middle School	8654 Homerich Ave SW, Byron Center	Grades 7–8. Opened fall 2004
Nickels Intermediate School	3100 84th St SW, Byron Center	Grades 5–6. Opened fall 2023.
Brown Elementary	8064 Byron Center Ave, Byron Center	Grades K–4 Opened in 1962
Countryside Elementary	8200 Eastern Ave SE, Byron Center	Grades K–4
Marshall Elementary	1756 64th St SW, Byron Center	Grades K–4
Heritage Elementary	8638 Byron Center Ave SW, Byron Center	Grades K-4. Formerly Nickels Intermediate School, Nickels Middle School and Byron Center High School prior to that. Opened fall 2024.
Early Childhood Center	2300 84th St SW Byron Center	Preschool
