= Frederik Meijer Trail =

Rail trail in Michigan, United States

Coordinates: 42.85348°N 85.71743°W

Frederik Meijer M-6 Trail
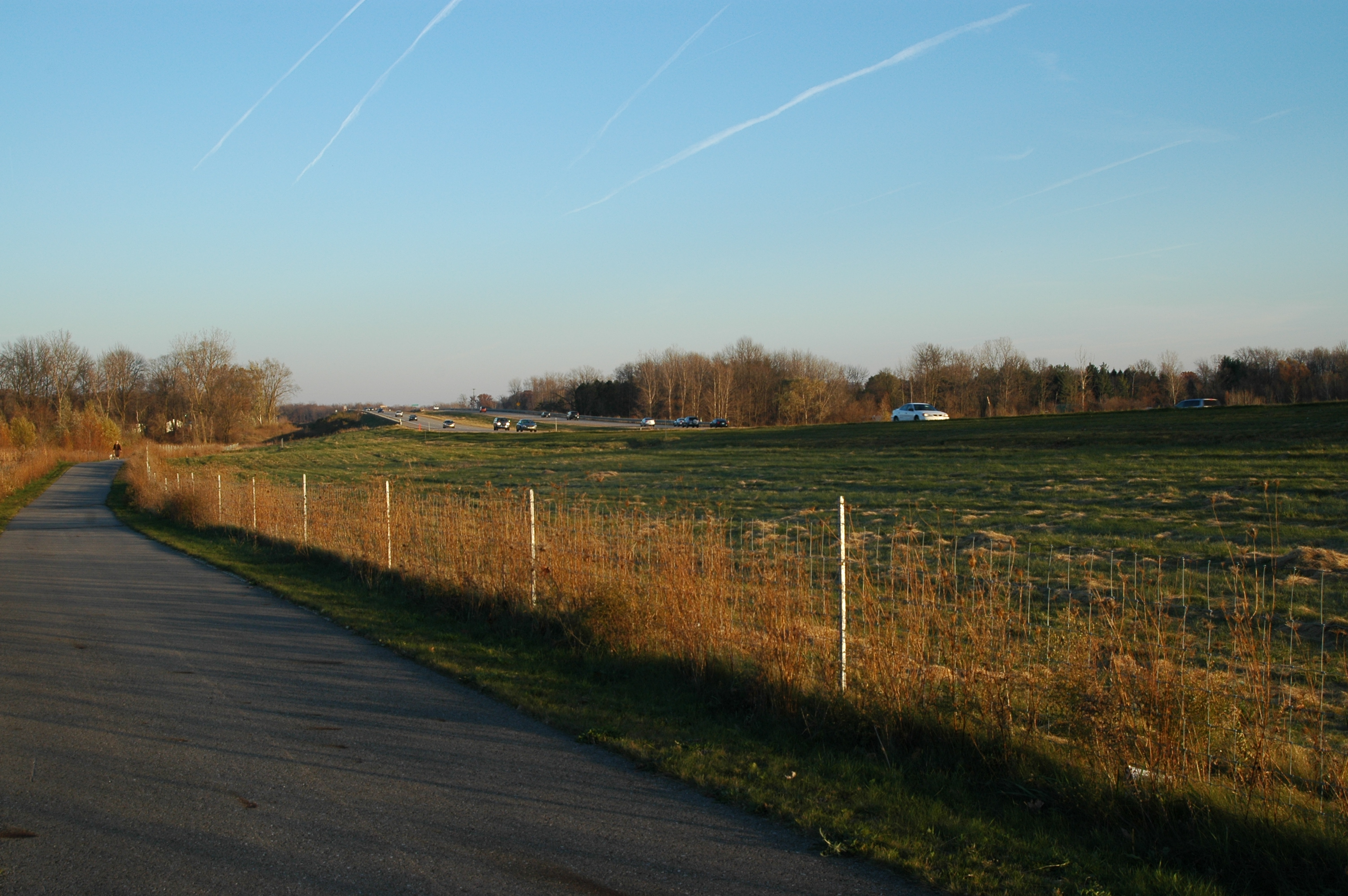
- Looking east at the trail and freeway near Kentwood
- Length: 9 mi (14 km)
- Location: Kent County, Michigan
- Trailheads: Wyoming, Michigan; Kentwood, Michigan
- Use: Hiking, biking

The Frederik Meijer M-6 Trail, formerly called the M-6 Trail, is a rail trail in Kent County, Michigan. It connects the Paul Henry–Thornapple Rail Trail with the Kent Trails in Byron Township, Michigan.

== Description ==
The trail starts at a junction with the Kent Trails west of Byron Center Avenue in Wyoming. The trail runs along the north side of the M-6 freeway to Clyde Park Avenue. The trail follows Clyde Park south to 68th Street where it terminates. Cyclists can continue along 68th Street over the US Highway 131 (US 131) freeway to Clay Avenue and north along Clay to the trail on the south side of M-6. The trail continues east over Division Avenue to Eastern Avenue where it crosses back over to the north side of the freeway. The eastern end is at Wing Avenue and 60th Street in Kentwood, at the Paul Henry–Thornapple Rail Trail.

== History ==
The M-6 Trail was constructed in a $3.5 million project that started in 2008. The goal was to create a 10-foot-wide (3.0 m) path linking the Kent Trails with the Paul Henry–Thornapple Rail Trail. The M-6 Trail was the brainchild of Gaines Township Supervisor Don Hilton, Sr. He had pushed to have the path included in the original freeway construction and opened with the rest of the South Beltline. The trail project was funded by $2.9 million in federal grants and $300,000 from the Frederik and Lena Meijer Foundation. The balance came from Kent County and the townships.

Work on the first phase was completed in June 2008. This segment connected the Kent Trails with 68th Street in Byron Township. Work on the second phase of the trail between Division Avenue and 60th Street was completed in November 2008. The remaining segment of the trail is a third phase for a dedicated trail along 68th Street and Clay Avenue to bridge the gap between Clyde Park and Division avenues remains incomplete. This 1.5-mile-long (2.4 km) segment was projected to cost between $750,000 and $1.5 million in 2008. One challenge to the segment is crossing an active Norfolk Southern rail line near US 131 and M-6.

== Safety ==
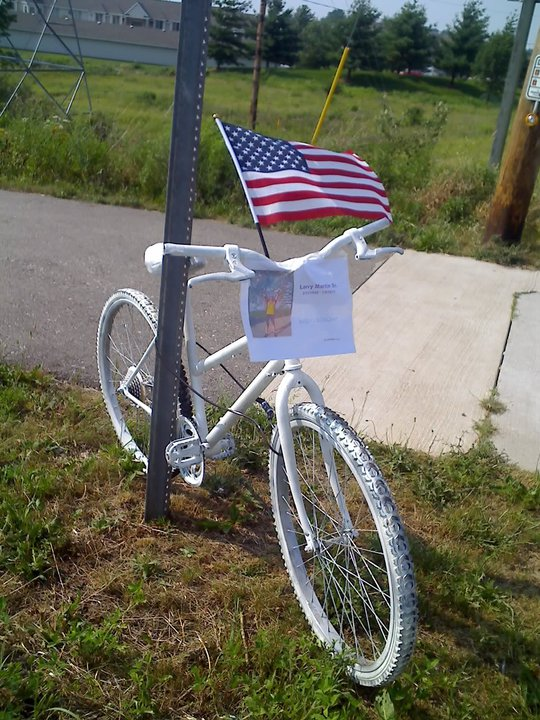
Ghostbike for Larry Martin Sr.

On July 9, 2011, cyclist Larry Martin Sr. was struck and killed at the Byron Center crossing. This prompted the installation of West Michigan's first ghostbike.

A coalition of agencies (the Kent County Road Commission, Kent County Parks, the City of Wyoming, and the Michigan Department of Transportation) met to discuss what could be done to enhance the safety of this trail crossing. The first improvement was the installation of a "countdown" signal, which relays to trail users the amount of time remaining to get across the seven traffic lanes before the signal turns green for Bryon Center Road. Since the two westbound freeway exit lanes are allowed an uncontrolled right turn on red, the next step was to reposition the trail crossing, moving it several hundred yards further north to connect with an existing city sidewalk and traffic signal. This work was slated to occur in June 2012.
