= Kent Trails =

Rail trail in Michigan, United States

Coordinates: 42.89408°N 85.73192°W

Kent Trails is a fifteen-mile rail trail in Kent County, Michigan that runs through the cities of Grand Rapids, Grandville, Walker, Wyoming and Byron Township and is part of a network of trails in and around Grand Rapids. It runs north and south from John Ball Park in Grand Rapids to 84th Street in Byron Township, with an extension that runs east/west along 76th Street and north/south from 76th Street to Douglas Walker Park on 84th Street.

== History ==
In June 2008, the Frederick Meijer Trail (Then called The M-6 Trail) was built along the M-6 freeway that connects the Paul Henry-Thornapple Rail Trail with Kent Trails.

In 2009, a six-mile stretch of the trail from Grand Rapids to Byron Township was repaved and widened from 8 feet to 10 feet. Three bridges along the trail were also replaced with new, wider bridges.
