= Dorr Township, Michigan =

Township in Michigan, United States

- Township
- Location within the state of Michigan
- Coordinates: 42°44′10″N 85°43′1″W
- Country: United States
- State: Michigan
- County: Allegan
- Established: Tom Ryskamp

Area
  - Total: 36.2 sq mi (93.7 km^{2})
  - Land: 36.1 sq mi (93.6 km^{2})
  - Water: 0.039 sq mi (0.1 km^{2})
- Elevation: 699 ft (213 m)

Population (2020)
  - Total: 7,922
  - Density: 219.2/sq mi (84.62/km^{2})
- Time zone: UTC-5 (Eastern (EST))
  - Summer (DST): UTC-4 (EDT)
- ZIP code: 49323
- Area codes: 616,269
- FIPS code: 26-22680
- GNIS feature ID: 1626186
- Website: dorrtownshipmi.gov

Dorr Township is a civil township of Allegan County in the southwest of the U.S. state of Michigan. The population was 7,922 at the 2020 census.

== History ==
This area was long the territory of Algonquian-language tribes, specifically the Ojibwe, Odawa and Potawatomi.

The first permanent European-American settlers in the township arrived in 1845. The first settler in the community of Dorr came in 1856, and arranged for the town to be platted in 1869. It received a United States post office in 1870.

== Communities ==
Dorr is an unincorporated community and census-designated place at 42°43′31″N 85°43′21″W, near the center of the township, west of U.S. Highway 131 exit 68. The ZIP code is 49323. It is in the northeast part of Allegan County, 7 miles (11 km) northwest of Wayland and 19 miles (31 km) south-southwest of Grand Rapids.

First known as "Dorr Centre", the community is believed to have been named for Thomas Wilson Dorr, a state legislator and leader of the Dorr Rebellion in Rhode Island that sought a broader franchise of universal male suffrage in the 1840s.

It has four elementary schools, including two public: Sycamore Elementary, which is part of the Hopkins school district, and Dorr Elementary, which is part of Wayland Union Schools. The two private schools are Saint Stanislaus Catholic School near Hilliards, and Moline Christian School.

Moline is an unincorporated community at 42°44′21″N 85°39′50″W just east of U.S. Highway 131. The ZIP code is 49335. The community lies mostly within Dorr Township but is on the eastern boundary. Some development extends into neighboring Leighton Township. Moline was first settled by European Americans in 1840. Development was stimulated when the Grand Rapids and Indiana Railway came through in 1870 and established a station here. It was platted in 1872 by Alfred Chapple.

North Dorr is a tiny hamlet at 42°46′06″N 85°45′42″W straddling the boundary between Dorr Township in Allegan County and Byron Township in Kent County. It began about 1865 and had its own post office from 1874 to 1905.

The city of Wayland is at the southeast corner of the township in Wayland Township.

== Geography ==
According to the United States Census Bureau, the township has a total area of 36.2 square miles (93.7 km^{2}), of which 36.1 square miles (93.6 km^{2}) is land and 0.039 square miles (0.1 km^{2}), or 0.07%, is water.

== Demographics ==
Historical population
| Census | Pop. | Note | %± |
|---|---|---|---|
| 1960 | 2,313 | | — |
| 1970 | 3,055 | | 32.1% |
| 1980 | 5,014 | | 64.1% |
| 1990 | 5,453 | | 8.8% |
| 2000 | 6,579 | | 20.6% |
| 2010 | 7,439 | | 13.1% |
| 2020 | 7,922 | | 6.5% |
Source: Census Bureau. Census 1960- 2000, 2010.

As of the census of 2000, there were 6,579 people, 2,100 households, and 1,768 families residing in the township. The population density was 182.0 inhabitants per square mile (70.3/km^{2}). There were 2,135 housing units at an average density of 59.1 per square mile (22.8/km^{2}). The racial makeup of the township was 96.93% White, 0.52% African American, 0.46% Native American, 0.26% Asian, 0.90% from other races, and 0.94% from two or more races. Hispanic or Latino of any race were 2.08% of the population.

There were 2,100 households, out of which 47.8% had children under the age of 18 living with them, 73.5% were married couples living together, 7.4% had a female householder with no husband present, and 15.8% were non-families. 12.9% of all households were made up of individuals, and 3.6% had someone living alone who was 65 years of age or older. The average household size was 3.13 and the average family size was 3.43.

In the township the population was spread out, with 33.7% under the age of 18, 7.5% from 18 to 24, 33.9% from 25 to 44, 19.4% from 45 to 64, and 5.5% who were 65 years of age or older. The median age was 32 years. For every 100 females, there were 101.8 males. For every 100 females age 18 and over, there were 103.0 males.

The median income for a household in the township was $60,446, and the median income for a family was $62,313. Males had a median income of $43,150 versus $26,510 for females. The per capita income for the township was $18,756. About 3.5% of families and 5.1% of the population were below the poverty line, including 4.8% of those under age 18 and 12.0% of those age 65 or over.

== Notable people ==
- Owen Bieber — former president of the United Auto Workers, was born in North Dorr
- Stubby Overmire — former professional baseball player, was born in Moline
- Bob Senneker — former professional stock car racer, was born in Dorr
