= M-6 (Michigan highway) =

State highway in Michigan, United States

M-6
- Paul B. Henry Freeway; South Beltline Freeway
- Grand Rapids metro area with M-6 highlighted in red

Route information
- Maintained by MDOT
- Length: 19.696 mi (31.698 km)
- Existed: November 20, 2001–present

Major junctions
- West end: I-196 near Hudsonville
- US 131 in Cutlerville; M-37 near Alaska
- East end: I-96 near Cascade

Location
- Country: United States
- State: Michigan
- Counties: Ottawa, Kent

Highway system
- Michigan State Trunkline Highway System; Interstate; US; State; Byways
← M-5	→ M-7

M-6, or the Paul B. Henry Freeway, is a 19.7-mile-long (31.7 km) east–west freeway and state trunkline highway in the United States that serves portions of southern Kent and eastern Ottawa counties south of Grand Rapids, Michigan. Although the freeway is named for Paul B. Henry, local residents and the press continue to use the original name, South Beltline as well on occasion. The freeway connects Interstate 196 (I-196) on the west with I-96 on the east. M-6 also provides a connection to U.S. Highway 131 (US 131) in the middle of its corridor while running through several townships on the south side of the Grand Rapids metropolitan area in Western Michigan. Each end is in a rural area while the central section has suburban development along the trunkline.

The freeway was originally conceived in the 1960s. It took 32 years to approve, plan, finance, and build the freeway from the time that the state first authorized funding in 1972 to the time of the ribbon-cutting ceremony in 2004 that opened the South Beltline to traffic. The project cost around $700 million or around $35 million per mile (approximately $22 million per kilometer). Initial construction started in November 1997, with the first phase opened in November 2001. The full freeway was opened in November 2004. The first phase of construction was completed in asphalt, while the second and third phases were built in concrete. The project was built with two firsts: the first single-point urban interchange (SPUI; /ˈspuːiː/) in Michigan, and a new technique to apply the pavement markings, embedding them into the concrete to reduce the chance of a snowplow scraping them off. In advance of the opening of the freeway to traffic, the Michigan Department of Transportation (MDOT) allowed the public to walk or bike the South Beltline in an open-house event called the "Southbelt Shuffle".

== Route description ==
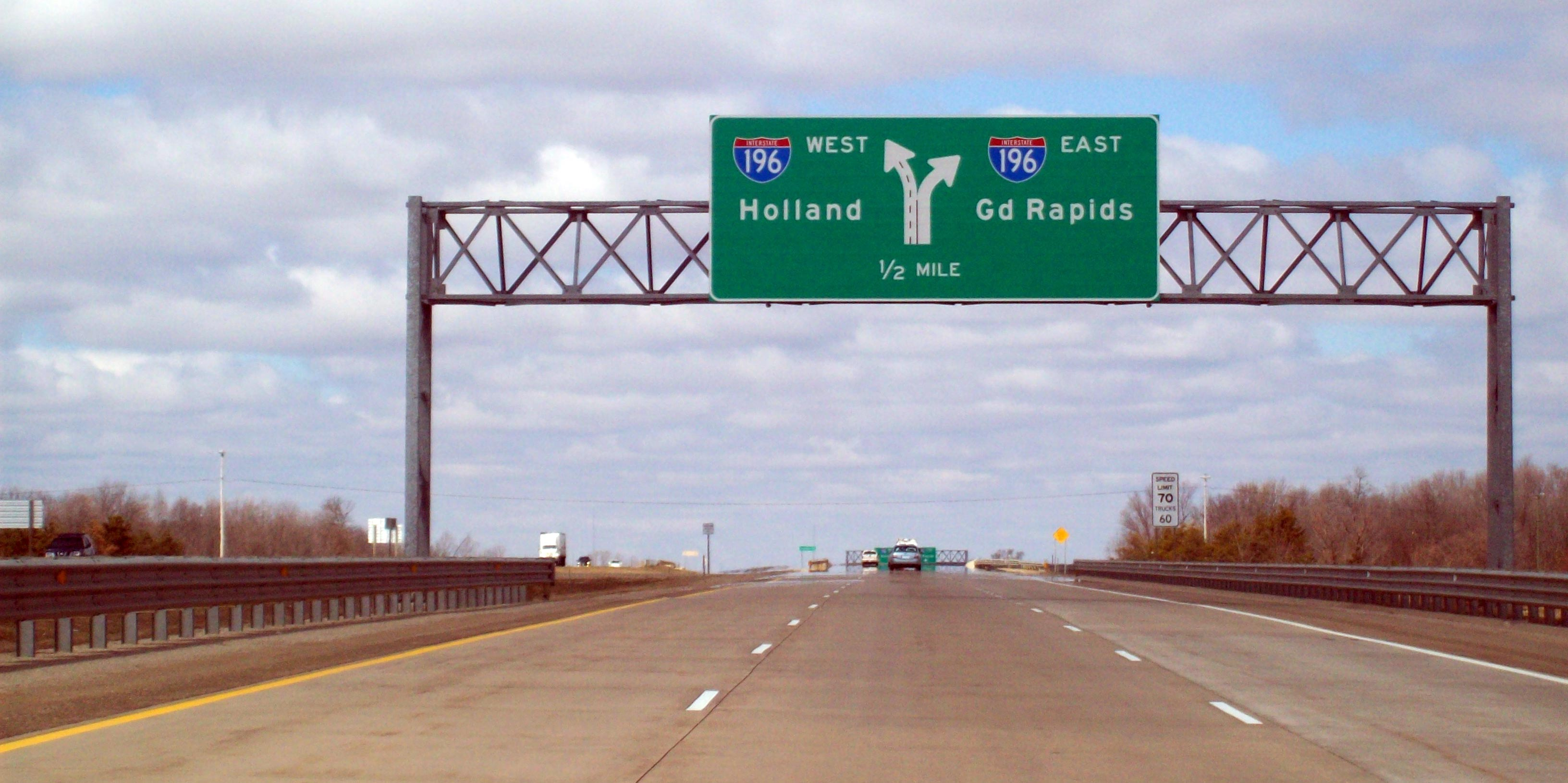
M-6 westbound near junction with I-196

M-6 starts at exit 64 on I-196 in Ottawa County near Hudsonville. The freeway runs southeast from the interchange through the rural Georgetown and Jamestown townships toward the county line. Through this area, MDOT traffic surveys measured a traffic count of 27,117 vehicles on average per day, the lowest along the freeway, in 2010. At Kenowa Avenue, the South Beltline crosses into Byron Township in Kent County. The freeway corridor is bounded on each side by farmland, scattered subdivisions, and small pockets of woodland. Near the Wilson Avenue interchange, M-6 curves to the northeast around the edge of the Ironwood Golf Course and heads for the interchange with Byron Center Avenue. On either side of the freeway at Byron Center Avenue, there are two hospitals, Metro Health and St. Mary's Southwest, the former located on the very southern edge of the city of Wyoming. Continuing east, the beltline curves to the southeast and into the cloverleaf interchange complex at US 131. This "mammoth" interchange stretches over a half mile (0.8 km) in one direction and over a mile (1.6 km) in the other, (Note: As measured by mainline freeway lane lengths.) encompassing 27 bridges and 18 retaining walls. This makes it the largest freeway interchange in Western Michigan. There are four overpasses which carry M-6 over the US 131 freeway: two for the main carriageways in each direction and two for the collector-distributor lanes on each side. The auxiliary lanes funnel the traffic using the interchange off the main carriageways to eliminate conflicts between merging streams of traffic. In the eastbound direction, the collector-distributor lane also has access to a ramp for traffic bound for 68th Street, which runs parallel to, and south of, the M-6 freeway. No such access to 68th Street is provided for westbound M-6 traffic, although 68th Street traffic can access each direction of M-6 or US 131.

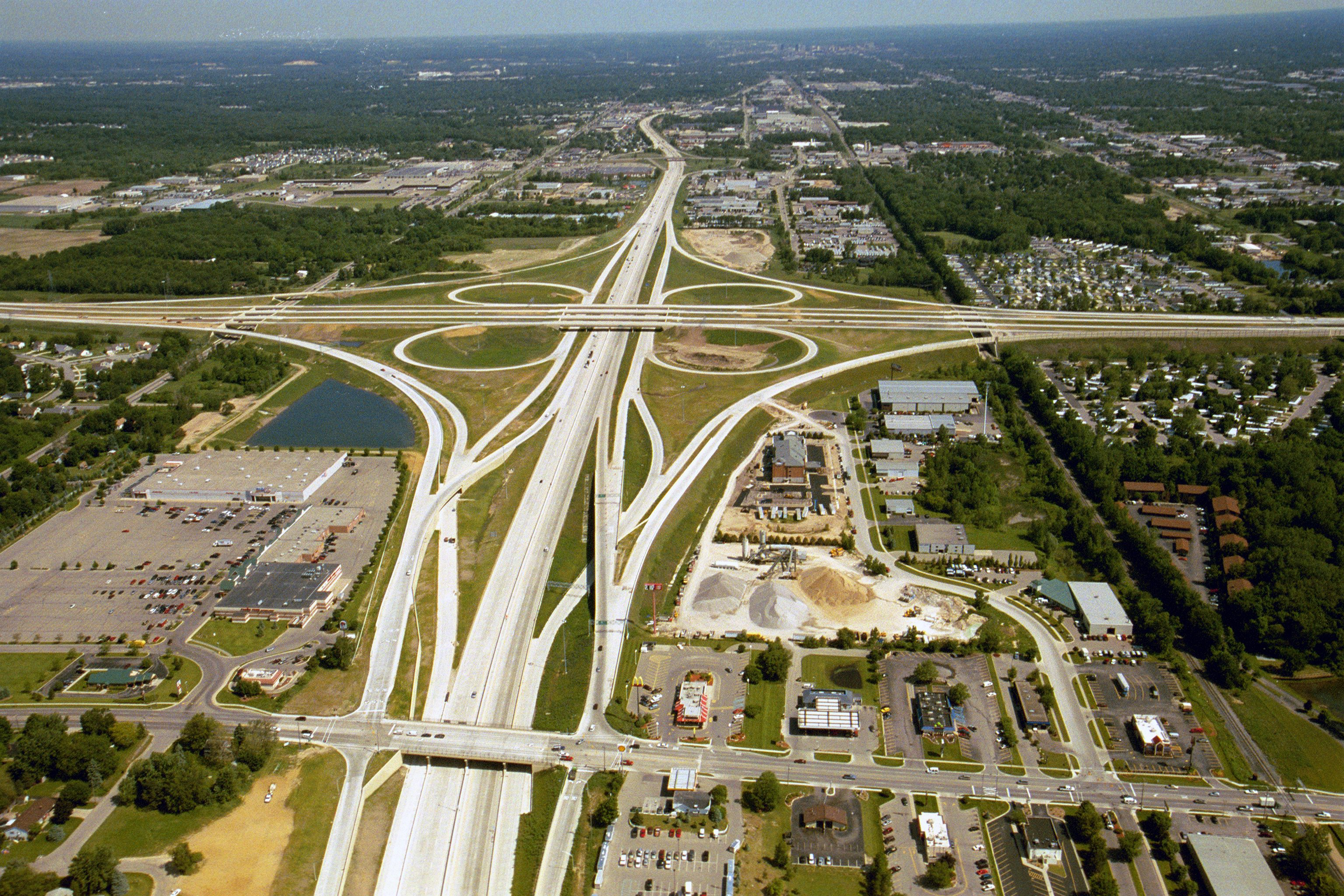
Cloverleaf interchange for US 131/M-6/68th Street in Wyoming

East of US 131, M-6 crosses over Division Avenue and enters Gaines Township through a series of sound barrier walls as the freeway ramps merge back into the main lanes. This area had the highest traffic counts in 2011 at 55,236 vehicles per day. Near Kalamazoo Avenue, the freeway passes through an area with retail businesses and movie theaters on each side of the interchange; to the northeast is East Kentwood High School. On the approach to the East Paris Avenue underpass, M-6 curves first to the northeast and then back to the southeast, passing near one of Steelcase's office buildings, the pyramid-shaped Corporate Development Center. The freeway begins to curve to the northeast as it crosses into Caledonia Township, with an interchange for M-37 (Broadmoor Avenue) and an overpass for 60th Street. M-6 curves around the southeast side of the Gerald R. Ford International Airport in Cascade Township. As the South Beltline nears I-96, it crosses 48th Street next to the Thornapple Pointe Golf Course. The carriageway splits into ramps for each direction of I-96, the ramps to eastbound I-96 crossing over the Thornapple River in the process. This interchange marks the eastern terminus of the Paul B. Henry South Beltline Freeway. The entire length of the freeway is listed on the National Highway System, a system of roads important to the nation's economy, defense and mobility.

The right-of-way along M-6 includes a 9-mile (14 km) pedestrian path known as the Frederik Meijer Trail. Previously called the M-6 Trail, it links the Kent Trails west of Byron Center Avenue in Wyoming with the Paul Henry Rail Trail at 60th Street and Wing Avenue by Paris Park in Kentwood.

== History ==
=== Earlier designations ===
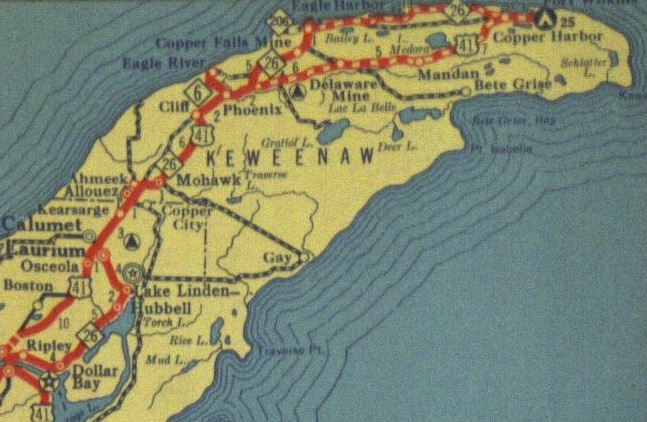
Section of the 1936/7 Official Michigan Highway Map showing M-6 in the Keweenaw Peninsula

The first appearance of M-6 was in 1926 as a two-mile (3.2 km) road in Keweenaw County in the Upper Peninsula. The highway ran from US 41 at Phoenix to north of Eagle River. The Michigan State Highway Department (Note: The Michigan State Highway Department was reorganized into the Michigan Department of State Highways and Transportation on August 23, 1973, and the name was later shortened to its current form in 1978.) redesignated the highway as M-111 in 1938, and it was redesignated two years later to become a part of the route of M-26.

In the late 1970s, during the second phase of construction of I-696 (Walter P. Reuther Freeway) in Metro Detroit, lobbying efforts and lawsuits attempted to block construction of the central section. If successful, the efforts would have left the freeway with a gap in the middle between the first (western) and second (eastern) phases of construction. During this time, MDOT assigned M-6 to the eastern section of the freeway under construction. Signs were erected along the service roads that followed 11 Mile Road to connect the already built stack interchange at I-75 east to I-94. By the time the eastern freeway segment was completed in 1979, the signage for M-6 was removed and replaced with I-696 signage, leaving an eight-mile (13 km) gap in the I-696 freeway until completion of the central section in 1989.

=== Current freeway ===
==== Planning ====
The South Beltline Freeway near Grand Rapids was a project that took about 32 years to complete. The idea dates back to the 1940s, but serious proposals were not made until the 1960s. The 1955 planning map for the Grand Rapids area Interstate Highways included a freeway roughly along the M-6 corridor before I-96 and I-196 were shifted north and east to their current locations. An increase in the state gas tax was approved in 1972 with the goal to finance local road projects in the state, including the South Beltline. The project was anticipated to cost $30–100 million (equivalent to $135 million–451 million in 2024) in June 1975 with an expected groundbreaking in 1982–85. The highway was studied in January 1981 for $144,000 (equivalent to $419,000 in 2024). The choice of consultants on the project was controversial; local planners felt that MDOT picked BKI Inc. only because they used a minority-owned subcontractor and not because they would be qualified for the assignment.

As this study was initiated, the route for the proposed freeway was located between 60th and 68th streets with a western end in Hudsonville and an eastern end in Lowell Township. The consultants were asked to study a full freeway and a limited access boulevard design. One final option was a "no-build" alternative; under this option, existing roads would be upgraded but no new roads would be built. The City of Grand Rapids opposed the freeway while the suburbs and townships south and west of the city supported it. City officials were concerned about the impact to commercial and industrial business in Grand Rapids. Hudsonville's city manager favored the proposal as a benefit to local vegetable producers who shipped produce to Detroit or Cleveland. Other supporters, such as the Georgetown Township supervisor, were concerned that delays in starting the project could increase costs. State and local officials expected the freeway in January 1981 to cost between $40–100 million (equivalent to $116 million–291 million in 2024). The road was to be started no sooner than 1990.

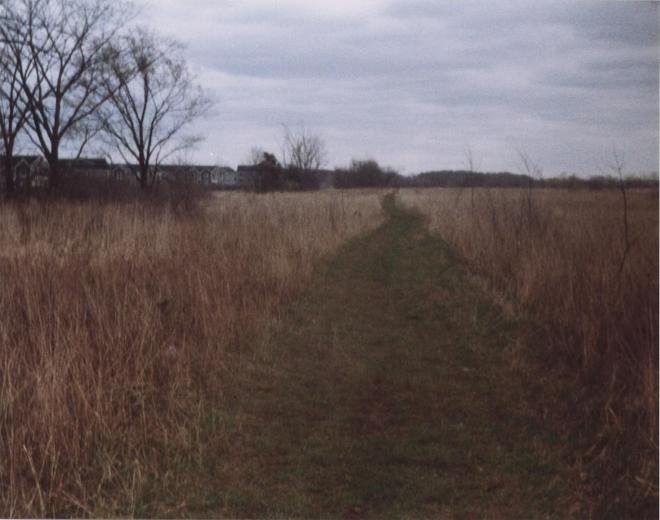
The site of M-6 in 1999 looking eastbound near Kalamazoo Avenue, Gaines Township

The boundaries for the highway corridor were determined by the consultants in April 1982, running between 60th and 84th streets, "dipping like a hammock beneath the cities of Kentwood and Wyoming". The results of the study by BKI were criticized by local planners in May 1982, who called the study "shabby and unprofessional work", and asked the state to fire the consulting firm. Local residents distributed 2,000 fliers to their neighbors in opposition to the freeway. The South Belt Local Advisory Board criticized BKI's 110-page study report as "filled with errors"; the consultants' earlier 26-page paper had been rejected by the board and MDOT as "unusable". An editorial in The Grand Rapids Press stated that the study did not help advance the project in the area, instead opening the proposed freeway up to new controversies. Doubts about the state's budget in 1982 to build the roadway combined with issues over the consultants and their study results.

A second citizens group, the South Belt Citizens Committee, was formed in July 1982 to gain additional public information on the project and supplement the work of the other groups, including the South Belt Local Advisory Board. BKI was fired as consultant on the project by MDOT on September 9, 1982. The switch to a new consultant delayed further study because of the timetable to take bids and interview the candidates. In the interim, work was shifted to local and state planners until a new consultant could be retained in an effort to minimize the delays involved. These local projects were focused on updating the information and maps from BKI's study and refining the scope of the highway's corridor.

Gaines, Cascade, and Caledonia townships and the city of Kentwood circulated a survey amongst their communities' planning commissions and elected boards in 1982. The survey showed an inconclusive preference for a limited-access highway in what was termed a "gut level reaction" to the proposed roadway. The South Belt Citizens Committee actively started to oppose the roadway during the fall of 1982, pressing local candidates for political office to take positions on the project. The group called the roadway a "holocaust" in its mailings to the candidates. Future Lieutenant Governor Dick Posthumus, then a member of the Michigan State Senate, called for an end to the studies in 1983; he would later reverse and become one of the project's biggest supporters.

MDOT hired a new consultant, Schimpeler/Coradino Associates, in 1984 to study the proposed freeway. The consultant recommended the freeway in March 1985. The South Beltline was included in the ten-year highway plan in 1986. By 1989, the state wanted to set the route in 1991 with construction starting in 1993. The freeway was studied as a possible toll road in June 1991 after three alternative routes were proposed the previous year. That September, the final route was set with a projected start date in 1997. The toll road concept was revived in September 1995 to offset the failure of a proposed gas tax increase. As a cost-saving measure, the number of interchanges was reduced to four from eight in June 1996. When a gas tax increase was passed in 1997, Governor John Engler promised at least seven access points for the freeway. The South Beltline was touted as "[cutting] travel time around Grand Rapids virtually in half".

==== Phase I ====
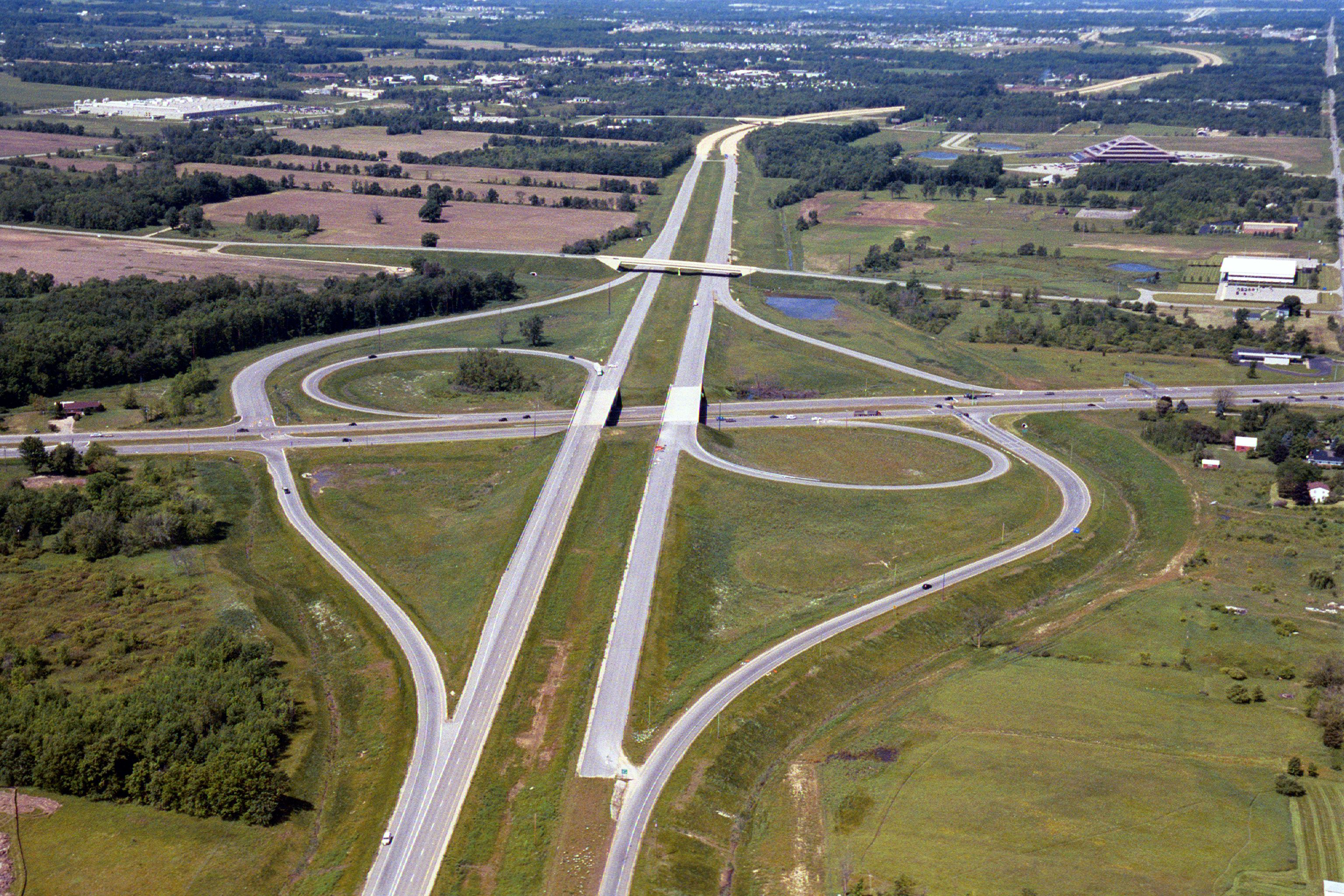
M-37 interchange incomplete while the remainder of the freeway was under construction

Proposals for the South Beltline Freeway were nearly 25 years old by the time initial construction was started in 1997. The Michigan State Legislature named the South Beltline around the same time for the Congressman Paul B. Henry, who died in office in 1993, serving in Gerald Ford's old US House seat. The cost of the construction of new roads like the South Beltline was a campaign issue when Engler ran for re-election against Geoffrey Fieger in 1998. The entire freeway was projected to open by 2008, with the first phase opening in 2002. MDOT gave the South Beltline its numerical designation on the July 1999 edition of the state map, marking M-6 for the first time as a dotted line, to denote it was "under construction". The legislature approved Engler's "Build Michigan III" program in 2000; the plan accelerated road projects in the state. The capital outlay for the year was $82 million (equivalent to $145 million in 2024). Condemnation proceedings were initiated in the Kent County Circuit Court in 1999 to clear the way for the acquisitions. Land that contained homes, farms, trailer parks, and businesses was purchased by MDOT to acquire the right-of-way needed for the freeway. The land needed measured 360 feet (110 m) wide and 20 miles (32 km) long. Land acquisitions for the South Beltline Freeway were completed in July 2001. Construction started later in the fall of 2001 on the second and third phases of the project.

The first leg of the South Beltline Freeway, located between M-37 (Broadmoor Avenue) and I-96, was finished six months early. Dry summer weather allowed the roadbed contractors to finish their portion of the five-mile (8.0 km) section of the freeway early, earning them a $300,000 bonus (equivalent to $506,000 in 2024). The overpasses for the remaining sections of the freeway were completed while the first phase was under construction, leaving the interchanges at US 131 and I-196 and the connecting roadbed to be completed at that time. The first section was paved in asphalt after MDOT reversed the decision to pave the whole freeway in concrete. That stretch of freeway opened to traffic on November 20, 2001. The state kept the overall project in an accelerated status headed into the next phases in 2002.

==== Phases II and III ====
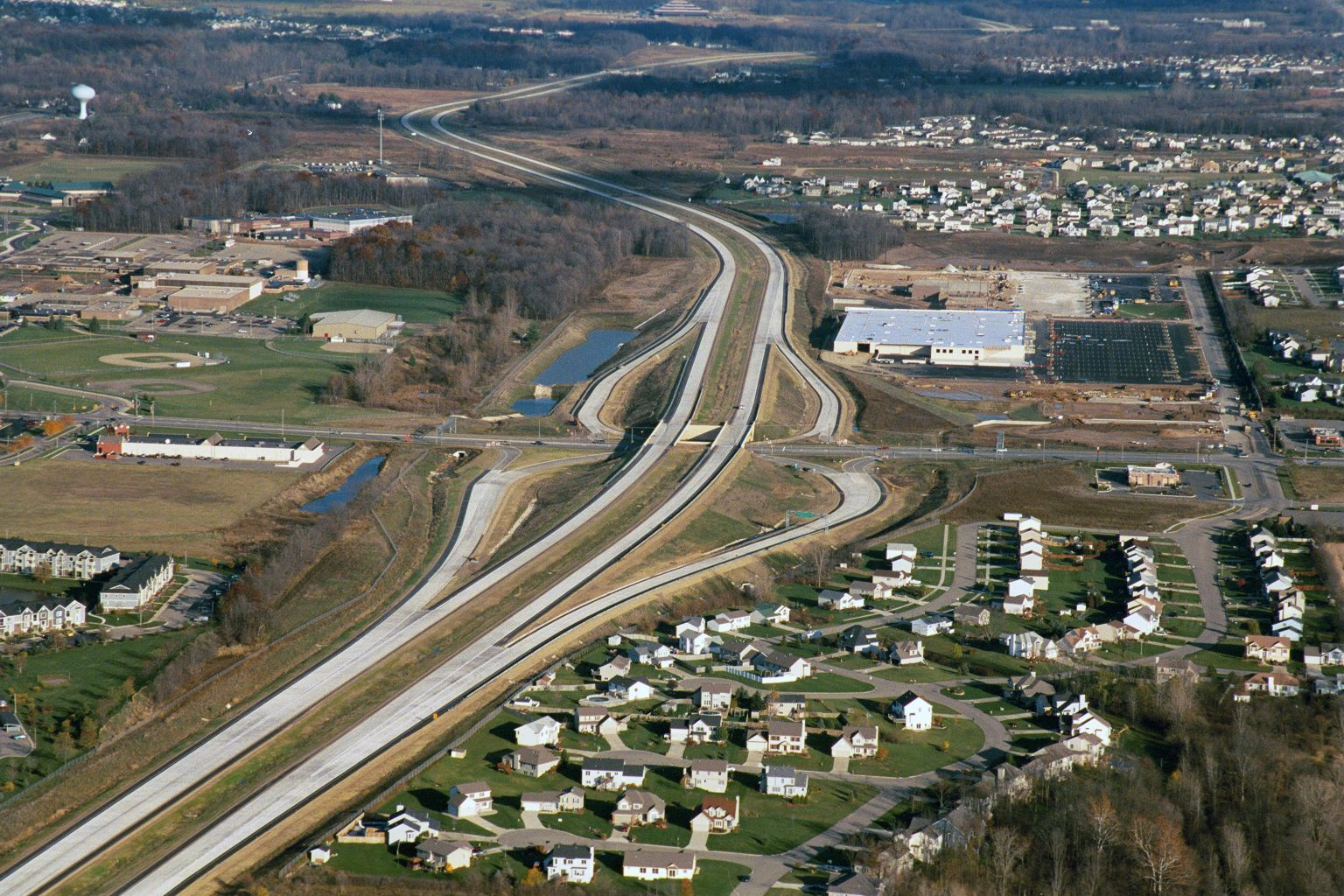
Kalamazoo Avenue SPUI under final construction

Construction of the remaining phases between US 131 and M-37 and between I-196 and US 131 was started on April 1, 2002. Area roads that crossed the path of the new freeway were closed to traffic with posted detours so that work could begin on the roadbed for the freeway. The last major project for the freeway was to replace bridge beams in the overpasses from westbound I-196 to eastbound M-6. Design flaws were found in 2002 in the size of the beams in the bridges over eastbound I-196 and the ramp from westbound M-6 to westbound I-196. The replacement was originally supposed to close traffic along I-196 over a weekend in 2004, but kept a lane closed for a full week, backing up traffic on the Interstate for two miles (3.2 km); completion of the work was delayed when human error caused a shortage of nuts and bolts.

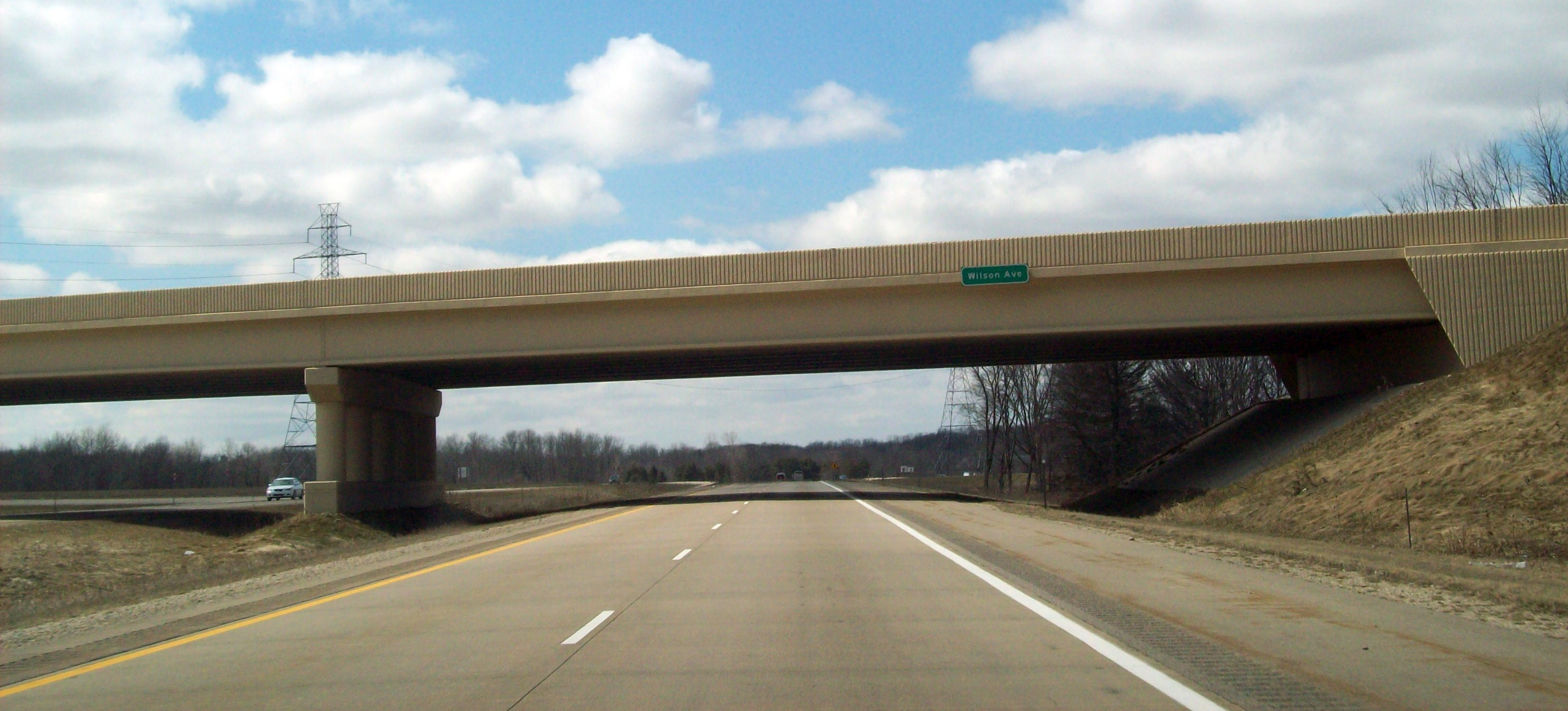
Wilson Avenue overpass

MDOT hosted an open house along the unopened section of M-6 between Kalamazoo and Byron Center avenues. This event took place on October 2, 2004, and was billed as the "Southbelt Shuffle", allowing the public to walk or bike along the freeway. The event was planned to draw attention to the M-6 Trail that runs parallel to the freeway. Some event participants brought their horses for the chance to ride on the freeway. The whole freeway was opened to traffic on November 17, 2004, after a ribbon cutting ceremony. When opened, reconstruction work was still being completed on overpass bridges at the I-196 interchange on the west end. The entire project cost $700 million (equivalent to $1.11 billion in 2024) to complete over the five-year construction period, about $35 million/mi (approximately $22 million/km, equivalent to $56 million/mi or $35 million/km in 2024). When the freeway was opened, it was the first in the state of Michigan to use a SPUI located at the Kalamazoo Avenue exit. All of the bridges and sound barrier walls were painted sienna beige as part of a "color theme" to the freeway. MDOT also used a new technique to recess the pavement markings into the concrete, designed to reduce the likelihood that snowplows would scrape them off. The signs are in miles, but "the entire M-6 freeway was designed and constructed in metric", according to MDOT manager Suzette Peplinski. The final ramps opened to traffic on December 9, 2004.

==== After construction ====
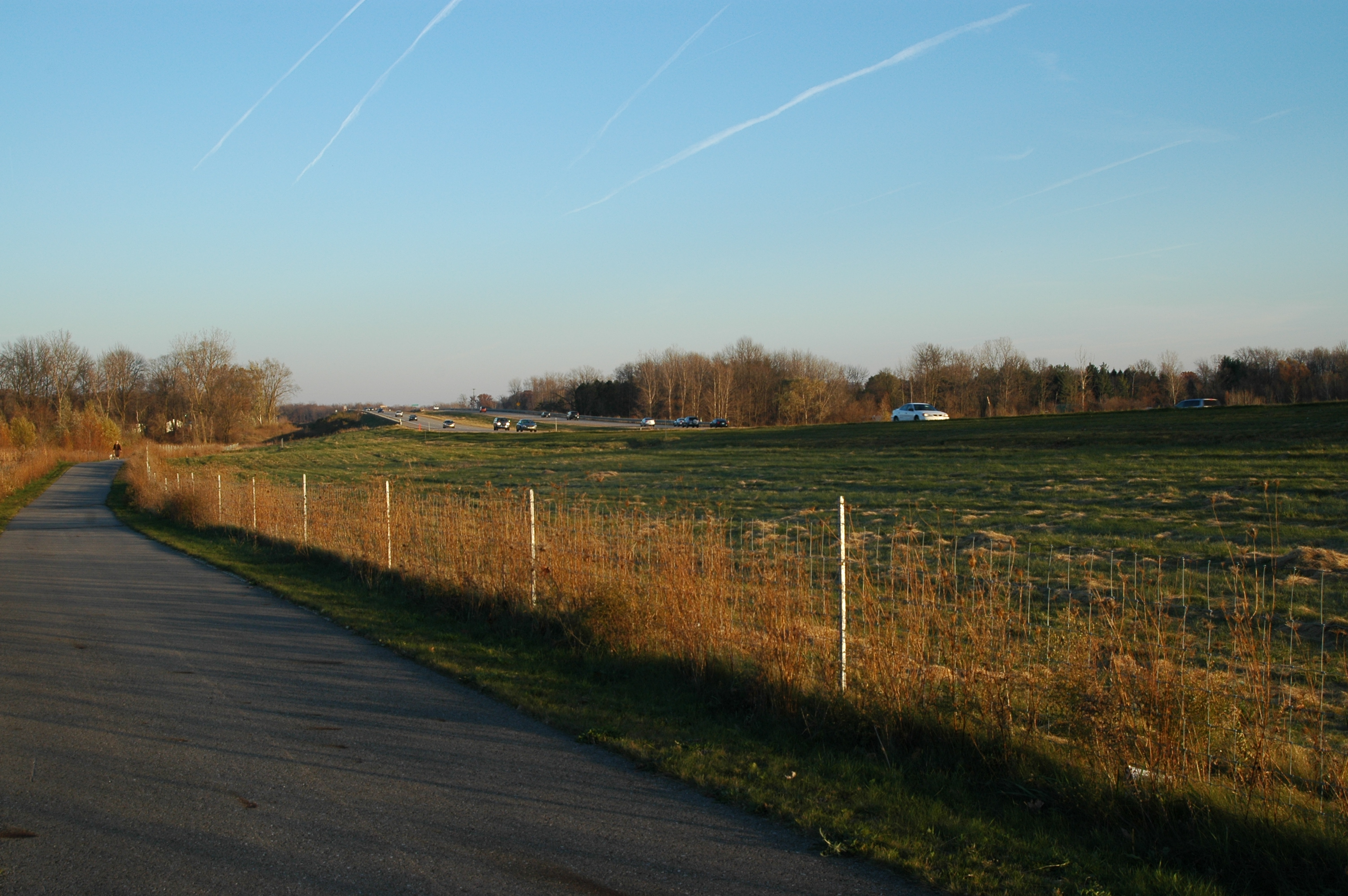
Frederik Meijer Trail looking east at the freeway in Kentwood

MDOT added the completed M-6 to the state maps in an updated printing in June 2005. At the time, the various online mapping services still did not show a complete freeway in eastern Ottawa or southern Kent counties. Services such as Mapquest and Yahoo! Maps rely on Tele Atlas out of New Hampshire for their mapping information, which, in turn, relies on agencies like MDOT to update their data. MDOT's map update came out nearly eight months after the initial opening due to its inclusion in a large-scale update to the state highway map.

A year after the freeway opened, traffic volumes along parallel roads like 44th, 56th and 68th streets dropped 40–50%. At the same time, roads with interchanges along the freeway saw increased traffic. Wilson Avenue experienced a 120% increase and sections of Byron Center Avenue jumped 100% in traffic levels a month after M-6 opened. Property values in the townships surrounding the freeway increased 11.3–12.4% by 2006 as a result of development attached to the freeway. Local officials credited the freeway for increased access to the area, driving housing starts as residents flocked to the communities for their schools and quality of life. In 2007, the Metro Health Village, a commercial development centered around the Byron Center Avenue exit and the hospital opened. Described as being similar to a mall with the hospital as a tenant, the village features restaurants, shops, offices and a hotel. Metro Health relocated from Grand Rapids to the location in Wyoming in the face of opposition to planned expansions of their previous location. Since opening, even though the freeway was officially named for Paul Henry, the original South Beltline name is still in use.

Reactions to the new freeway were not all positive. In a special editorial in The Grand Rapids Press after the freeway opened in 2004, local resident Curt MacDougall summarized the criticisms of the new freeway. He cited the loss of rural farmland and wetlands as a negative effect of the highway. The editorial also discussed that the freeway does decrease travel times for some residents, but it will mean increased development. That development will mean further urban sprawl, and could spur the creation of additional highways in the area.

The M-6 Trail was constructed in a $3.5 million project (equivalent to $5 million in 2024) that started in 2008. The goal was to create a 10-foot-wide (3.0 m) path linking the Kent Trails with the Paul Henry Rail Trail. The M-6 Trail was the brainchild of Gaines Township Supervisor Don Hilton Sr. He had pushed to have the path included in the original freeway construction and opened with the rest of the South Beltline. The trail project was funded by $2.9 million (equivalent to $4.1 million in 2024) in federal grants and $300,000 (equivalent to $430,000 in 2024) from the Frederik and Lena Meijer Foundation. The balance came from Kent County and the townships. Work on the trail was completed in November 2008.

In 2009, the asphalt section of M-6 had to be repaired. This section of roadway between East Paris Avenue and 48th Street was rated poorly by the Michigan Infrastructure and Transportation Association, while the concrete west of Broadmoor Avenue had favorable marks. MDOT budgeted $2 million in repairs on top of previous crack-related fixes that were handled by the original pavement contractor under a warranty in 2006. The local press described the 4.7-mile (7.6 km) stretch of road as "troublesome" in relation to pavement quality issues.

Legislation was signed by Governor Rick Snyder on December 27, 2014, to name the section of M-6 between Byron Center and Kalamazoo avenues the David John Warsen Memorial Highway. Warsen, a US Navy SEAL, was killed in a helicopter accident in Afghanistan in 2012. This section of the highway was dedicated on August 15, 2015.

== Exit list ==
County	Location	mi	km	Exit	Destinations	Notes
Ottawa	Georgetown Township	0.000	0.000	—	I-196 (G.R. Ford Freeway) – Grand Rapids, Holland	Exit 64 on I-196
Ottawa	Jamestown Township	1.737	2.795	1	8th Avenue	
Kent	Byron Township	3.778	6.080	3	Wilson Avenue – Grandville	
Kent	Byron Township	5.756	9.263	5	Byron Center Avenue – Wyoming	
Kent	Byron Township	7.886– 8.776	12.691– 14.124	8	US 131 – Grand Rapids, Kalamazoo; 68th Street – Cutlerville	No access to 68th Street from westbound M-6; exit 77 on US 131 for M-6 and exit 76 on US 131 for 68th Street
Kent	Gaines Township	10.867	17.489	11	Kalamazoo Avenue – Kentwood	Single-point urban interchange
Kent	Caledonia Township	15.370– 15.391	24.736– 24.769	15	M-37 (Broadmoor Avenue) – Grand Rapids, Hastings, Gerald R. Ford International Airport	
Kent	Cascade Township	19.696	31.698	—	I-96 – Muskegon, Lansing	Exit 46 on I-96
1.000 mi = 1.609 km; 1.000 km = 0.621 mi: Incomplete access

== See also ==
- Maryland Route 200, a freeway bypass in Maryland that has a similar history
- Illiana Expressway, a conceptual highway south of Chicago with a similar controversy
