= Pine Rest Christian Mental Health Services =

Coordinates: 42°50′14″N 85°39′25″W

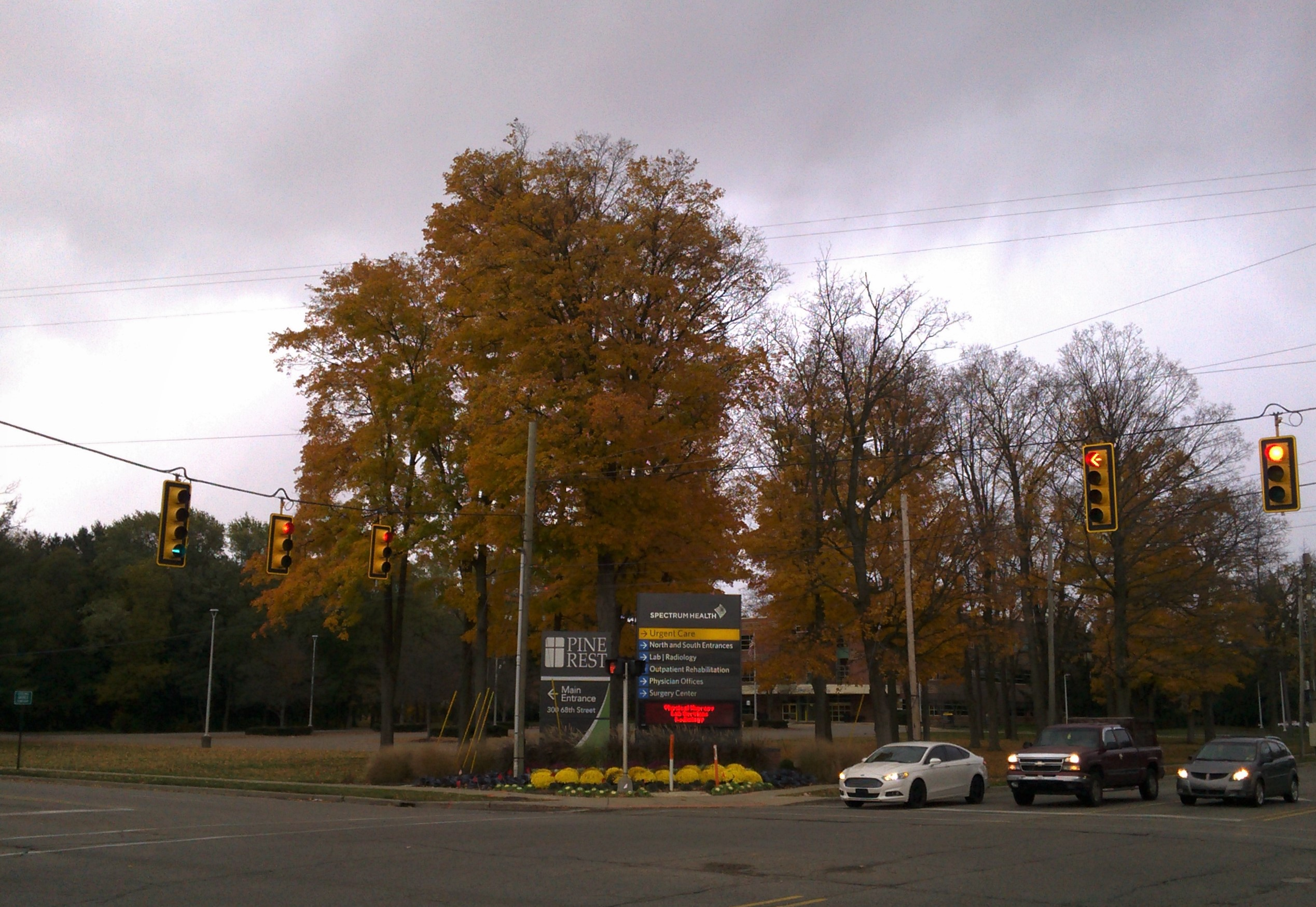
- Pine Rest Christian Mental Health Services

Geography
- Location: Grand Rapids, Michigan, Michigan, United States

Organization
- Care system: Private
- Type: Psychiatric

Services
- Emergency department: None
- Beds: 200

History
- Founded: 1910

Links
- Website: http://www.pinerest.org
- Lists: Hospitals in Michigan

Pine Rest Christian Mental Health Services is one of the largest free-standing behavioral health providers in the United States, offering services including inpatient hospitalization, partial hospitalization, testing and assessment, outpatient therapy and psychiatry, teletherapy, addiction treatment and recovery, extensive child and adolescent programs, postpartum and other perinatal mood disorder treatment, senior care services, electroconvulsive therapy (ECT), and transcranial magnetic stimulation therapy (TMS). In addition to the main campus in Grand Rapids, Pine Rest also has over 20 outpatient locations throughout Michigan.

Pine Rest is a psychiatric hospital and behavioral health provider, with the main treatment campus located in Grand Rapids, Michigan. The Chief Executive Officer and President is Dr. Mark Eastburg, appointed December, 2006.

Pine Rest's inpatient hospitalization program is licensed for 200 beds, with residential services for adolescent boys and girls, older adults coping with dementia, those needing addiction services, those in need of sub-acute detoxification program services, and developmentally disabled persons.

Pine Rest incorporates faith and healing into the care of patients and it has an active chaplain service to offer spiritual care to the patients. In addition, Clinical Pastoral Education is offered through Pine Rest.

== History ==
Pine Rest was founded in 1910 as the Christian Psychopathic Hospital.

In 2007 the hospital opened the Gerald & Jane-Ann Postma Center for Worship and Education, a $3.7 million training center targeted at nursing, behavior health and pastoral students and Pine Rest staff members. With more than 15,000 square feet (1,400 m^{2}), the center can accommodate groups of as many as 500 people in five multi-purpose rooms. It also houses a chapel for campus residents and for training pastoral education students. An art gallery, named for Bruce and Mary Leep is inside the Postma Center.

In 2008, Pine Rest opened the Interactions Residential Treatment Center at its main campus. The secured, 16-bed residential treatment center was designed for helping adults with chronic or persistent mental illness, including those with co-occurring mild development disabilities and mental illnesses, or with a mental illness and substance abuse issues.

In December 2012, Pine Rest implemented its Mother and Baby Program designed to provide short-term, intensive treatment to women who are pregnant or up to one year postpartum and struggling with perinatal mood disorders.

In 2013, the Van Andel-Cook Center for Dementia and Geriatric Behavioral Health opened as part of a 3-phase expansion project on the Pine Rest main campus in Cutlerville. 349 donors contributed more than $3.2 million toward the total cost of the project. Services include an older adult inpatient unit, outpatient services such as neuropsychological evaluation, memory disorder assessment and treatment recommendations, and diagnosis and treatment for senior cognitive and behavioral health issues. The center was named for its lead donors, the Foundation of Jay and Betty Van Andel and the Peter C. and Emajean Cook Foundation.

In February 2014, a 22-bed inpatient hospital unit opened as part of a 3-phase facilities investment construction project. Services at the Redwood Unit are dedicated to the treatment and care of patients with co-occurring disorders (mental health diagnosis and substance abuse diagnosis). The 20,417 sq ft wing includes four single barrier-free rooms, six single rooms and six semi-private rooms.

In March 2014, the Pine Rest Professional Practice Group (PPG) opened up a new outpatient clinic in Portage, MI. The building consists of five offices, has nine therapists, and provides therapy services for those with mental health disorders and/or substance use disorders.

In July 2014, the first class of residents started work in Pine Rest's four-year Psychiatric Residency Program led by Director Dr. William Sanders.

In the fall of 2016 plans for the Flex unit were put into play. The flex unit will consist of young adults and older adolescents, as well as adults. It is in its name that the unit will flex, or have flexibility to meet population needs.

In the spring of 2019 Pine Rest opened a regional first Psychiatric Urgent Care Center on their Cutlerville Campus. The center is meant to provide same-day assessment and treatment for people experiencing acute psychiatric symptoms who can't wait for routine outpatient services, a common problem for patients seeking mental health treatment. The goal is to reduce the number of hospitalizations due to mental health. "This is a national issue and we’re going to take sort of a national level thinking and bring it here to West Michigan, to serve the community better,” said Pine Rest President and CEO Mark Eastburg.

Grand Rapids area hospitals had 14,623 behavioral health visits to emergency rooms in 2016, according to Pine Rest.

The Psychiatric Urgent Care Center is expected to reduce wait times for psychiatric assessments and will provide clinical services in a calm environment for those experiencing psychiatric symptoms such as: depression, anxiety, panic attacks, suicidal thoughts, disturbing thoughts, acute grief reactions, trouble managing daily activities and substance abuse disorders.

== Programs and Services ==
=== Addiction Treatment ===
Pine Rest expanded addiction treatment services in 2022 and now provides a full continuum of addiction treatment services including medically supervised detox, short term residential, partial (or day) programs, intensive outpatient (IOP), outpatient detox, individual therapy and group therapy.

=== Pine Rest Pediatric Center of Behavioral Health ===
Pine Rest broke ground in May 2024 on a $98 million pediatric center that is set to open in March 2026. The new center expands services for children and teens for inpatient, outpatient and psychiatric urgent care.

Pine Rest opening a partial hospitalization pilot program for eating disorders in October 2024 and plans to pilot additional programs before the facility officially opens.

=== Psychiatric Urgent Care ===
The center, opened April 15, 2019, is designed to provide immediate assessment and treatment for those over the age of 18 experiencing acute psychiatric symptoms who cannot wait for routine outpatient intervention. The Pine Rest urgent care is headed by a physician with a specialty in psychiatric emergency care and staffed by physician assistants and nurse practitioners with specialized training in behavioral health. Most patients at the psychiatric urgent care are seen within 15 minutes of their arrival, and spend an average of two hours at the clinic.

=== Outpatient Programs ===
Pine Rest clinicians provide counseling, therapy, consultation, psychiatry, and medication management for all ages. In addition, specialty clinics offer testing and assessment, forensic services, addiction treatment, TMS therapy, ECT therapy and transition support when patients are discharged from higher levels of service. Clinics are located in Michigan. Most outpatient services are also available via telehealth in Michigan.

=== Employee Assistance Programs ===
Pine Rest provides EAP services to over 600 organizations. Services include critical incident response, mental health services, elder care consultation, financial and legal services, organizational development and training, coaching services, and mediation services.

== Lectures, classes and events ==
Pine Rest sponsors a variety of workshops, classes and special events throughout the year for professionals and the general public. Medical and clinical topics are geared toward working professionals with MERC accreditation, while topics for the public include, but are not limited to, anger management for adults and teens, eating disorders, families living with mental illness, postpartum depression and other perinatal mood disorders, dementia, and the effects of aging.

== Rustic Market Thrift Store ==
Proceeds from the Rustic Market Thrift Store in the Gaines Township are used to extend the ministry of Pine Rest Christian Mental Health Services through the Patient Assistance Fund (PAF). The fund provides financial assistance to those in the community who need mental health care, but have little or no means to pay for services. Since opening in 1971, the Rustic Market has generated over $1 million for PAF.

Rustic Market gives residential employees coupons during the holidays.
