= Gaines Township, Kent County, Michigan =

Gaines Township, Michigan
- Charter township
- Gaines Charter Township
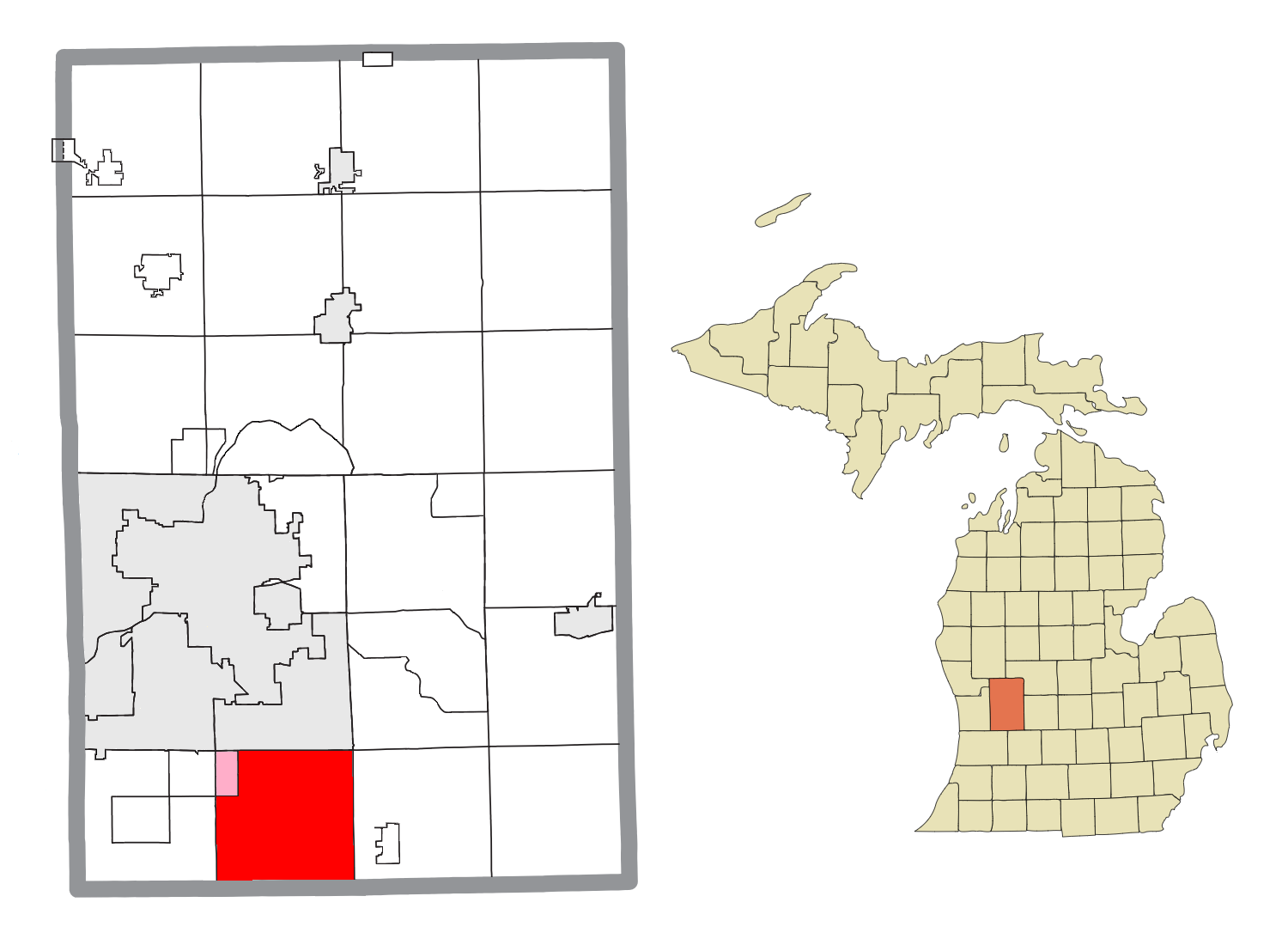
- Location within Kent County (red) and an administered portion of the Cutlerville CDP (pink)

- Location within the state of Michigan Location within the United States
- Coordinates: 42°50′04″N 85°38′13″W
- Country: United States
- State: Michigan
- County: Kent
- Established: 1848

Government
  - Supervisor: Robert DeWard
  - Clerk: Michael Brew

Area
  - Total: 35.76 sq mi (92.62 km^{2})
  - Land: 35.70 sq mi (92.46 km^{2})
  - Water: 0.062 sq mi (0.16 km^{2})
- Elevation: 817 ft (249 m)

Population (2020)
  - Total: 28,812
  - Density: 807.1/sq mi (311.6/km^{2})
- Time zone: UTC-5 (Eastern (EST))
  - Summer (DST): UTC-4 (EDT)
- ZIP code(s): 49315 (Byron Center); 49316 (Caledonia); 49348 (Wayland); 49508, 49512, 49548 (Grand Rapids)
- Area code: 616
- FIPS code: 26-081-31240
- GNIS feature ID: 1626329
- Website: Official website

Gaines Charter Township is a charter township of Kent County in the U.S. state of Michigan. The population was 28,812 at the 2020 census. The township is part of the Grand Rapids metropolitan area and is located about 3.0 miles (4.8 km) south of the city of Grand Rapids.

== Communities ==
- Corinth is an unincorporated community in the southwest part of the township at 42°46′58″N 85°39′49″W on the boundary with Byron Township. In 1866, three Cody brothers built a steam-powered grist mill and sawmill here, and the place became known as "Cody's Mills". A village named "Corinth" was platted and recorded for Jacob and David Rosenberg by Robert S. Jackson on September 14, 1871. A post office named Cody's Mills was established in May 1867. It was renamed Corinth in March 1871 and operated until December 1899.
- Cutlerville is an unincorporated community and census-designated place in the northwest of the township. The CDP also extends mostly into Byron Township to the west.
- Dutton is an unincorporated community centered at the intersection of Dutton Avenue and 68th Street. It was first settled in 1870.
- Gaines Center had a post office from 1854 to 1856.
- Gainesville was a station on the Grand Rapids and Indiana Railroad. It had a post office from 1856 until 1871.

== History ==
The area was first settled by Alexander Clark and Alexander L. Bouck in 1837. The township was named Gaines in 1846, after Gaines, New York, the birth place of many of the town's first settlers.

Gaines Township was officially established in 1848.

== Geography ==
According to the U.S. Census Bureau, the township has a total area of 35.76 square miles (92.62 km^{2}), of which 35.70 square miles (92.46 km^{2}) is land and 0.06 square miles (0.16 km^{2}) (0.17%) is water.

The township is about 13 miles (21 km) south of downtown Grand Rapids. It is directly south of the city of Kentwood. Caledonia Charter Township and the village of Caledonia are to the east. Leighton Township in Allegan County is to the south and Byron Township to the west.

=== Major highways ===
- US 131 runs parallel near the entire western border but does not run within the township.
- M-6 runs west–east near the northern edge of the township.

== Education ==
Gaines Township is served by three separate public school districts. The majority of the township is served by Caledonia Community Schools to the east in Caledonia Township. The western portion of the township is served by Bryon Center Public Schools in Byron Center, while the northwestern corner is served by Kentwood Public Schools in Kentwood.

== Demographics ==
As of the 2020 United States Census, there was a population of 28,812 people. 66.8% were non-Hispanic White, 11.5% Black or African American, 7.5% Asian, 0.3% Native American, and 10.1% of two or more races. 9.8% were Hispanic or Latino.

As of the 2010 United States census, there were 25,146 people, 9,220 households, and 6,740 families in the township. The population density was 704.3 inhabitants per square mile (271.9/km^{2}). There were 9,866 housing units at an average density of 276.3 per square mile (106.7/km^{2}). The racial makeup of the township was 77.5% White, 9.0% African American, 0.40% Native American, 4.6% Asian, 0.02% Pacific Islander, 0.01% from other races, and 2.1% from two or more races. Hispanic or Latino of any race were 6.1% of the population.

There were 9,220 households, out of which 38.3% had children under the age of 18 living with them, 56.2% were married couples living together, 12.6% had a female householder with no husband present, and 26.9% were non-families. 21.9% of all households were made up of individuals, and 6.1% had someone living alone who was 65 years of age or older. The average household size was 2.69 and the average family size was 3.15.

The township population contained 27.5% under the age of 18, 9.0% from 18 to 24, 27.6% from 25 to 44, 25.4% from 45 to 64, and 10.5% who were 65 years of age or older. The median age was 32 years. For every 100 females, there were 96.5 males. For every 100 females age 18 and over, there were 94.5 males.

The median income for a household in the township was $53,415, and the median income for a family was $56,402. About 3.2% of families and 5.4% of the population were below the poverty line, including 4.0% of those under age 18 and 4.4% of those age 65 or over. Males had a median income of $41,446 versus $27,333 for females. The per capita income for the township was $23,459.
