= Cutlerville, Michigan =

- Census-designated place (CDP) & unincorporated community
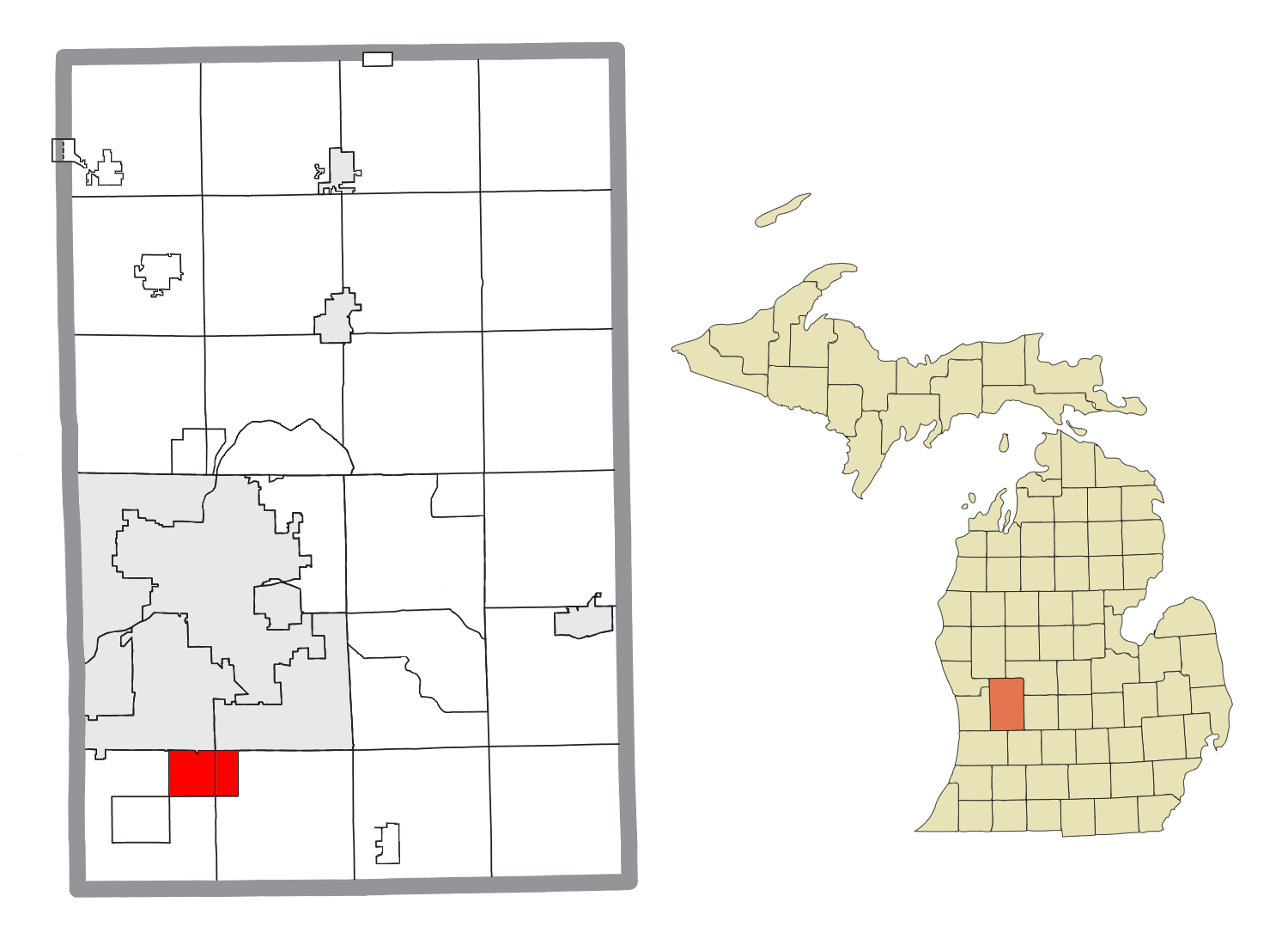
- Location within Kent County

- Location within the state of Michigan Location within the United States
- Coordinates: 42°50′27″N 85°39′49″W
- Country: United States
- State: Michigan
- County: Kent
- Townships: Byron and Gaines
- Settled: 1853

Area
  - Total: 5.75 sq mi (14.89 km^{2})
  - Land: 5.73 sq mi (14.85 km^{2})
  - Water: 0.015 sq mi (0.04 km^{2})
- Elevation: 676 ft (206 m)

Population (2020)
  - Total: 17,849
  - Density: 3,112/sq mi (1,201.6/km^{2})
- Time zone: UTC-5 (Eastern (EST))
  - Summer (DST): UTC-4 (EDT)
- ZIP code(s): 49315 (Byron Center); 49508 (Grand Rapids); 49548 (Grand Rapids)
- Area code: 616
- FIPS code: 26-19500
- GNIS feature ID: 0624256

Cutlerville is an unincorporated community and census-designated place (CDP) in Kent County in the U.S. state of Michigan. The population was 17,849 as of the 2020 census. The community is located mostly within Byron Township to the west with a smaller portion within Gaines Township to the east.

The community is part of the Grand Rapids metropolitan area and is about 3.0 miles (4.8 km) south of the city of Grand Rapids.

== History ==
John Cutler, who came here from New York state with his wife and ten children, bought 312 acres (1.26 km^{2}) in 1853 and built a log cabin. In 1891, his son John I. Cutler built the Cutler mansion, which in 1910 became the nucleus of the Pine Rest Christian Mental Health Services.

== Geography ==
According to the U.S. Census Bureau, the CDP has a total area of 5.89 square miles (15.26 km^{2}), of which 5.87 square miles (15.20 km^{2}) is land and 0.02 square miles (0.05 km^{2}) (0.34%) is water

The Buck Creek flows through the community, which flows north to the Grand River in the city of Grandville.

Cutlerville is in southwestern Kent County within Byron Township on the west and Gaines Township on the east. The community is bordered to the north by the cities of Wyoming and Kentwood.

=== Major highways ===
- US 131 runs south–north through the center of the community.
- M-6 runs west–east through the northern portion of the community and has an interchange with U.S. Route 131.

== Demographics ==
Historical population
Census	Pop.	Note	%±
2000	15,114		—
2010	14,370		−4.9%
2020	17,849		24.2%
U.S. Decennial Census

=== 2020 census ===
As of the 2020 census, Cutlerville had a population of 17,849. The median age was 35.0 years. 25.0% of residents were under the age of 18 and 14.2% of residents were 65 years of age or older. For every 100 females there were 94.4 males, and for every 100 females age 18 and over there were 90.5 males age 18 and over.

White alone, not Hispanic or Latino, made up 63.1% of the population.

100.0% of residents lived in urban areas, while 0.0% lived in rural areas.

There were 6,872 households in Cutlerville, of which 32.8% had children under the age of 18 living in them. Of all households, 41.4% were married-couple households, 18.8% were households with a male householder and no spouse or partner present, and 31.0% were households with a female householder and no spouse or partner present. About 26.6% of all households were made up of individuals and 9.3% had someone living alone who was 65 years of age or older.

There were 7,197 housing units, of which 4.5% were vacant. The homeowner vacancy rate was 1.1% and the rental vacancy rate was 5.5%.

Racial composition as of the 2020 census
Race	Number	Percent
White	12,208	68.4%
Black or African American	2,082	11.7%
American Indian and Alaska Native	116	0.6%
Asian	949	5.3%
Native Hawaiian and Other Pacific Islander	23	0.1%
Some other race	946	5.3%
Two or more races	1,525	8.5%
Hispanic or Latino (of any race)	2,061	11.5%

=== 2000 census ===
As of the census of 2000, there were 15,114 people, 5,975 households, and 3,907 families residing in the community. The population density was 2,527.2 inhabitants per square mile (975.8/km^{2}). There were 6,253 housing units at an average density of 1,045.5 per square mile (403.7/km^{2}). The racial makeup of the community was 88.93% White, 4.61% African American, 0.58% Native American, 1.64% Asian, 0.02% Pacific Islander, 1.96% from other races, and 2.26% from two or more races. Hispanic or Latino of any race were 4.49% of the population.

There were 5,975 households, out of which 33.2% had children under the age of 18 living with them, 47.8% were married couples living together, 13.4% had a female homeowner with no husband present, and 34.6% were non-families. 25.6% of all households were made up of single persons, and 6.0% had someone living alone who was 65 years of age or older. The average household size was 2.49 and the average family size was 2.99.

In the community, the population was spread out, with 27.4% under the age of 18, 10.6% from 18 to 24, 32.7% from 25 to 44, 18.9% from 45 to 64, and 10.5% who were 65 years of age or older. The median age was 32 years. For every 100 females, there were 97.8 males. For every 100 females age 18 and over, there were 94.4 males.

The median income for a household in the community was $40,809, and the median income for a family was $43,972. Males had a median income of $36,085 versus $24,989 for females. The per capita income for the community was $19,648. About 4.4% of families and 7.2% of the population were below the poverty line, including 9.3% of those under age 18 and 5.2% of those age 65 or over.

== Notable people ==
- Brian Diemer, bronze medalist in the 3000 meter steeplechase at the 1984 Summer Olympics
- Carlee Hoffman, Paralympic Games gold medalist
