= OpenRoad Brewery =

Brewery and tap room in Wayland, Michigan

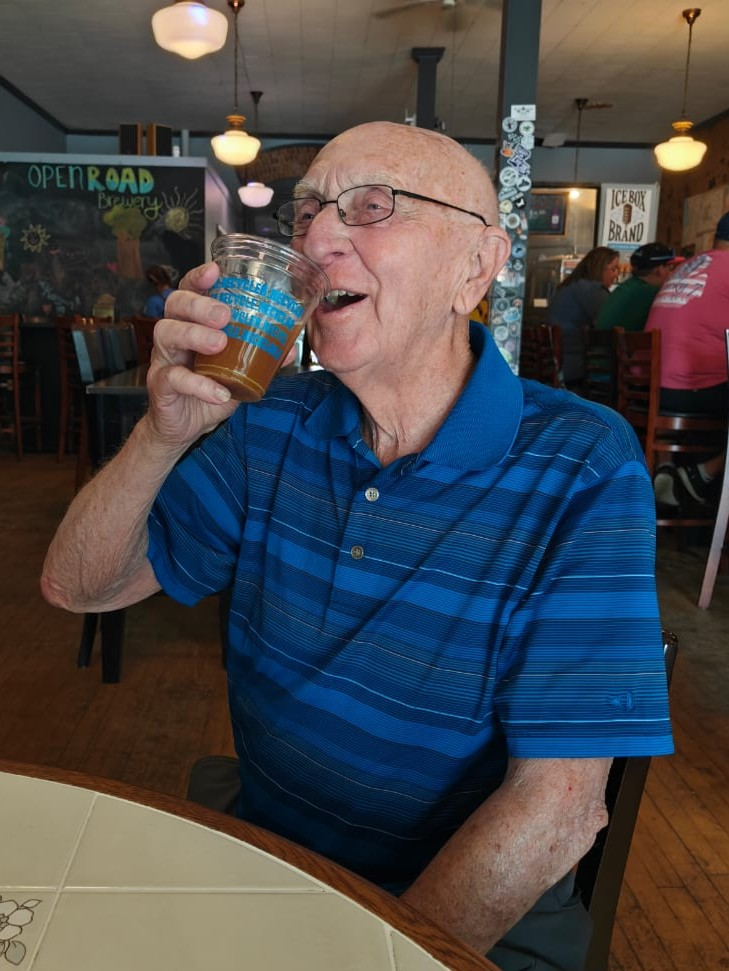
Burrell Stein drinking a Beerell Stein IPA at the OpenRoad Brewery on July 11 2025

OpenRoad Brewery is a brewery and tap room in Wayland, Michigan. OpenRoad brews a variety of craft beers, including Wanderlust Wheat Ale, Highbeam Hazy, Road Rage Double IPA, Beerell Stein IPA, Citradisiac Pale Ale, Blacktop Stout, State Flower Seltzer and Lowrider Lager. Several seasonal and experimental brews are planned. The brewery opened in 2016, founded by Bruce Patrick and his son, Branden. In 2024, Gordon Thompson and Jen Frank Brenton purchased the brewery and took ownership.
