= Leighton Township, Michigan =

- Township
- Location within the state of Michigan
- Coordinates: 42°43′42″N 85°36′49″W
- Country: United States
- State: Michigan
- County: Allegan

Area
  - Total: 35.6 sq mi (92.2 km^{2})
  - Land: 34.9 sq mi (90.3 km^{2})
  - Water: 0.73 sq mi (1.9 km^{2})
- Elevation: 879 ft (268 m)

Population (2020)
  - Total: 7,001
  - Density: 200.8/sq mi (77.52/km^{2})
- Time zone: UTC-5 (Eastern (EST))
  - Summer (DST): UTC-4 (EDT)
- FIPS code: 26-46760
- GNIS feature ID: 1626602
- Website: www.leightontownship.org

Leighton Township is a civil township of Allegan County in the U.S. state of Michigan. The population was 7,001 at the 2020 census, up from 4,934 at the 2010 census.

== Communities ==
Corning is a tiny unincorporated community at 42°43′29″N 85°36′03″W near the center of the township and with the township hall nearby. There was a post office operating there from 1882 to 1902.

Green Lake was a summer resort at 42°44′42″N 85°35′59″W on the eponymous lake, which drains into Green Lake Creek, a tributary of the Rabbit River. A post office operated there from 1899 to 1901. There are now permanent residences around the lake.

Moline is an unincorporated community at 42°44′21″N 85°39′50″W just east of U.S. Highway 131 exit 68. The ZIP code is 49335. The community lies mostly within neighboring Dorr Township but lies on the boundary, and some development extends into Leighton Township.

The city of Wayland is at the southwest corner of the township and has incorporated a small area of land from the township.

The Leighton Township Fire Department has 32 part-paid firefighters divided between two stations. The department responds to an average of 150 calls per year.

== Geography ==
According to the United States Census Bureau, the township has a total area of 35.6 square miles (92.2 km^{2}), of which 34.9 square miles (90.3 km^{2}) is land and 0.73 square miles (1.9 km^{2}), or 2.03%, is water.

== Demographics ==
Historical population
| Census | Pop. | Note | %± |
|---|---|---|---|
| 1960 | 1,951 | | — |
| 1970 | 2,354 | | 20.7% |
| 1980 | 2,772 | | 17.8% |
| 1990 | 3,069 | | 10.7% |
| 2000 | 3,652 | | 19.0% |
| 2010 | 4,934 | | 35.1% |
| 2020 | 7,001 | | 41.9% |
Source: Census Bureau. Census 1960- 2000, 2010.

As of the census of 2000, there were 3,652 people, 1,246 households, and 1,004 families residing in the township. The population density was 104.7 inhabitants per square mile (40.4/km^{2}). There were 1,386 housing units at an average density of 39.7 per square mile (15.3/km^{2}). The racial makeup of the township was 97.75% White, 0.11% African American, 0.93% Native American, 0.08% Asian, 0.03% Pacific Islander, 0.44% from other races, and 0.66% from two or more races. Hispanic or Latino of any race were 1.04% of the population.

There were 1,246 households, out of which 41.7% had children under the age of 18 living with them, 70.4% were married couples living together, 7.4% had a female householder with no husband present, and 19.4% were non-families. 14.8% of all households were made up of individuals, and 5.3% had someone living alone who was 65 years of age or older. The average household size was 2.93 and the average family size was 3.29.

In the township, the population was spread out, with 30.9% under the age of 18, 8.4% from 18 to 24, 29.8% from 25 to 44, 23.1% from 45 to 64, and 7.9% who were 65 years of age or older. The median age was 34 years. For every 100 females, there were 99.9 males. For every 100 females age 18 and over, there were 101.6 males.

The median income for a household in the township was $51,743, and the median income for a family was $57,067. Males had a median income of $42,477 versus $27,679 for females. The per capita income for the township was $18,736. About 5.2% of families and 5.3% of the population were below the poverty line, including 5.8% of those under age 18 and 7.9% of those age 65 or over.
