= Paul Henry–Thornapple Rail Trail =

Trail in Michigan, United States

Paul Henry-Thornapple Rail Trail
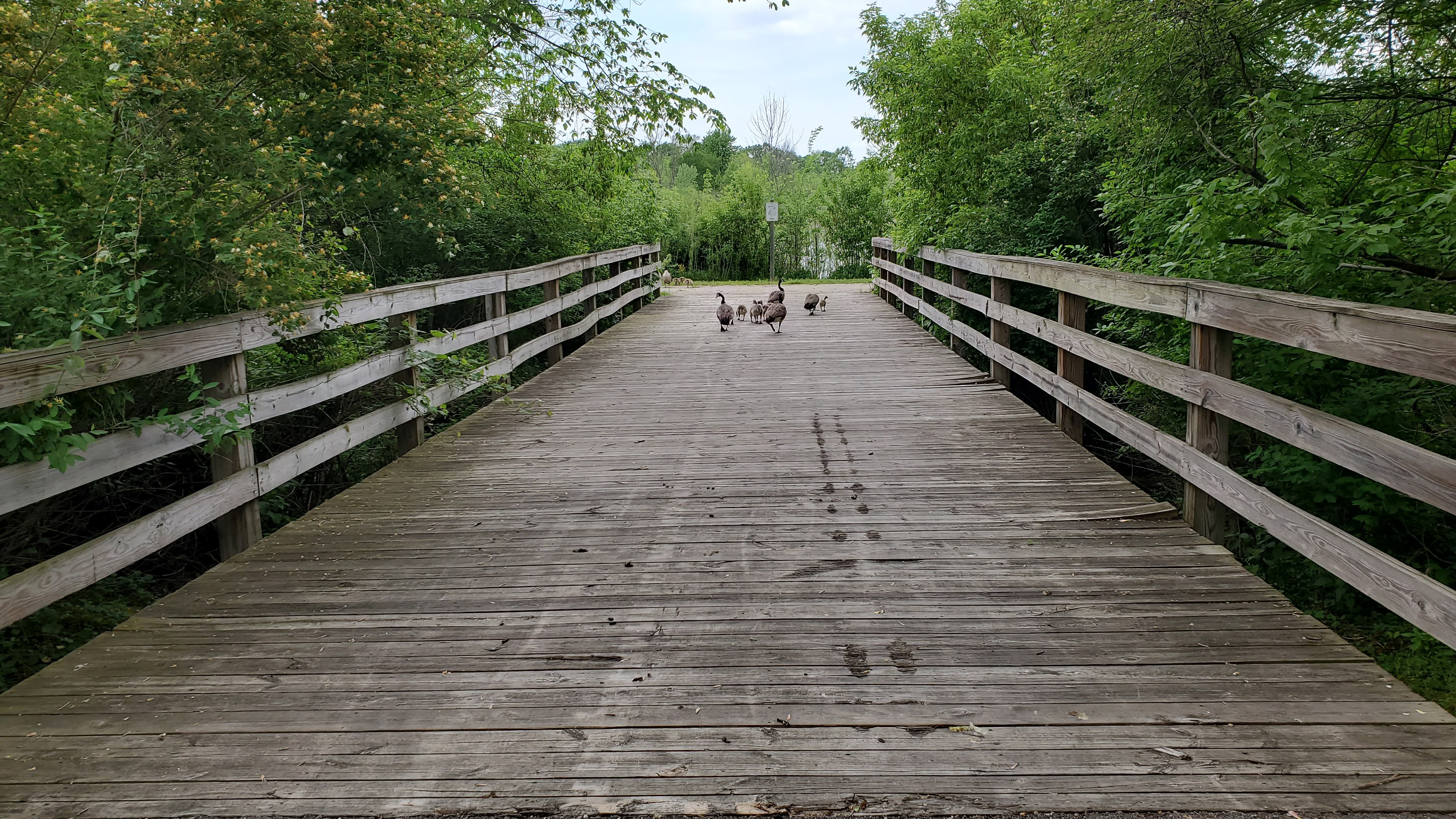
- Entering East Paris Nature Park in Kentwood on the trail headed west.
- Length: 42 miles (67.6 km) (when complete)
- Trailheads: Grand Rapids, Michigan; Vermontville, Michigan
- Use: Cycling, Hiking
- Website: https://www.thornappletrail.com

Sections of Trail (Paved, Gravel, and Grass)

The Paul Henry–Thornapple Rail Trail (commonly referred to as the Thornapple Trail or Paul Henry Trail) is a rail trail that when complete will be 42 miles (68 km) long, running from Grand Rapids to Vermontville, Michigan. The trail closely follows the original route of the Grand River Valley Railroad, constructed in 1868-69 and in operation from 1870 to 1983. The trail is managed by multiple different agencies. The trail has multiple paved sections still to be connected, with a 2 1/2 mile gap between Caledonia and Middleville, a 5-mile gap between Middleville and Hastings, and multiple smaller gaps between Hastings and Nashville. Completed sections of the trail have a 10-foot (3.0 m) wide paved surface with a gravel shoulder. The longest paved section of trail is within Kent county between the trail terminus at Kalamazoo Ave in Kentwood and 108th St in Caledonia Township. The trail has connections with the Frederik Meijer Trail (formerly the M-6 Trail) and the East-West Trail, both in Kentwood. A section of the trail from Irving to Middleville (McCann Rd. to Crane Rd.) is part of the North Country National Scenic Trail.

== History ==
The trail is constructed on a section of the former railroad the Grand River Valley Railroad, which ran from Grand Rapids to Jackson. Originally chartered on May 4, 1846, the railroad remained dormant for 20 years. Construction on the line began in 1868–1869. The first train, pulled by the locomotive 'Muskegon', arrived in Grand Rapids on January 1, 1870. Regular service commenced a few weeks later on January 17.

Shortly after the line's creation on August 15, 1870, it was perpetually leased by the Michigan Central Railroad as a branch for their system. On September 15, 1916, the Grand River Valley Railroad was formally merged into the Michigan Central Railroad. Subsequently, on February 1, 1930, The New York Central Railroad absorbed the Michigan Central.

In the 1920s, passenger service featured a daily train each way between Grand Rapids and Detroit. By the 1950s, the service had been downgraded from a train to a motorized passenger car called a Budd Rail Diesel Car or RDC. New York Central referred to the service as 'The Beeliner'. The tracks were well maintained, with relatively high speed limits of 60 mph for passenger service and 40 mph for freight. Passenger service concluded with the last Beeliner running in December 1959. Freight service continued and usually consisted of a daily train heading from Grand Rapids to Jackson with a return trip the next day.

On February 1, 1968, New York Central merged with Pennsylvania Railroad to form Penn Central Railroad. By 1970, Penn Central was in bankruptcy and track maintenance and service suffered. On April 1, 1976, Conrail took over operation of the line and discontinued service on the line east of Vermontville to Eaton Rapids. While Conrail did not wish to continue operating the line, an agreement was reached to ensure the line's operation under a contract with the State of Michigan. In 1979, Conrail did not renew its agreement with the state.

On July 15, 1979, the Kent-Barry-Eaton Connecting Railway (KBEC) commenced operations under a contract with the state, securing a subsidy for operating the line between Grand Rapids and Vermontville, servicing 11 customers, 6 of them "regulars". It was the first minority owned railroad in the country. Freight primarily consisted of grain, lumber, manufactured goods and scrap metal. A failure to build freight traffic on the line combined with "inexperienced railroad management" led to the state ending its contract with KBEC and service on the line ceasing completely on October 15, 1983.

== Route Description ==
=== Kent ===
The northwest terminus is at Kalamazoo Ave just south of 44th St on the border of Kentwood and Grand Rapids. The trail begins by heading southeast, and after a mile, has a connection with the East-West Trail in Kentwood. Continuing southeast, the trail progresses toward 60th St and Wing Ave, where it links to the Frederik Meijer Trail. From there, the trail heads east along 60th St, connecting to Paris Park Nature Reserve and passing through East Paris Nature Park.

After traversing the park, the trail turns south to follow East Paris Ave before crossing over M-6. After crossing 68th St, the trail departs from East Paris Ave and resumes its southward course through farmland, eventually rejoining the old railroad embankment. At the embankment, a spur follows the old rail line northwest, connecting to Dutton Shadyside Park and 68th St.

Continuing south, the trail reaches 76th St before turning east, rejoining the embankment and continuing southeast. The trail extends for 4 miles through rural farmland before reaching Kraft Ave and 92nd St and running through Caledonia Community Schools property. Continuing on the old railbed the trail has a connection to a township trail through Caledonia Lakeside Park before reaching Main St in the Village of Caledonia. At this point, the trail transitions to sidewalks and sharrows through the village until South Maple St and Kinsey St, where the trail resumes its southeastward course. The trail then turns east to cross M-37 before quickly returning south to rejoin the embankment, continuing southeast to the county line at 108th St.

=== Barry ===
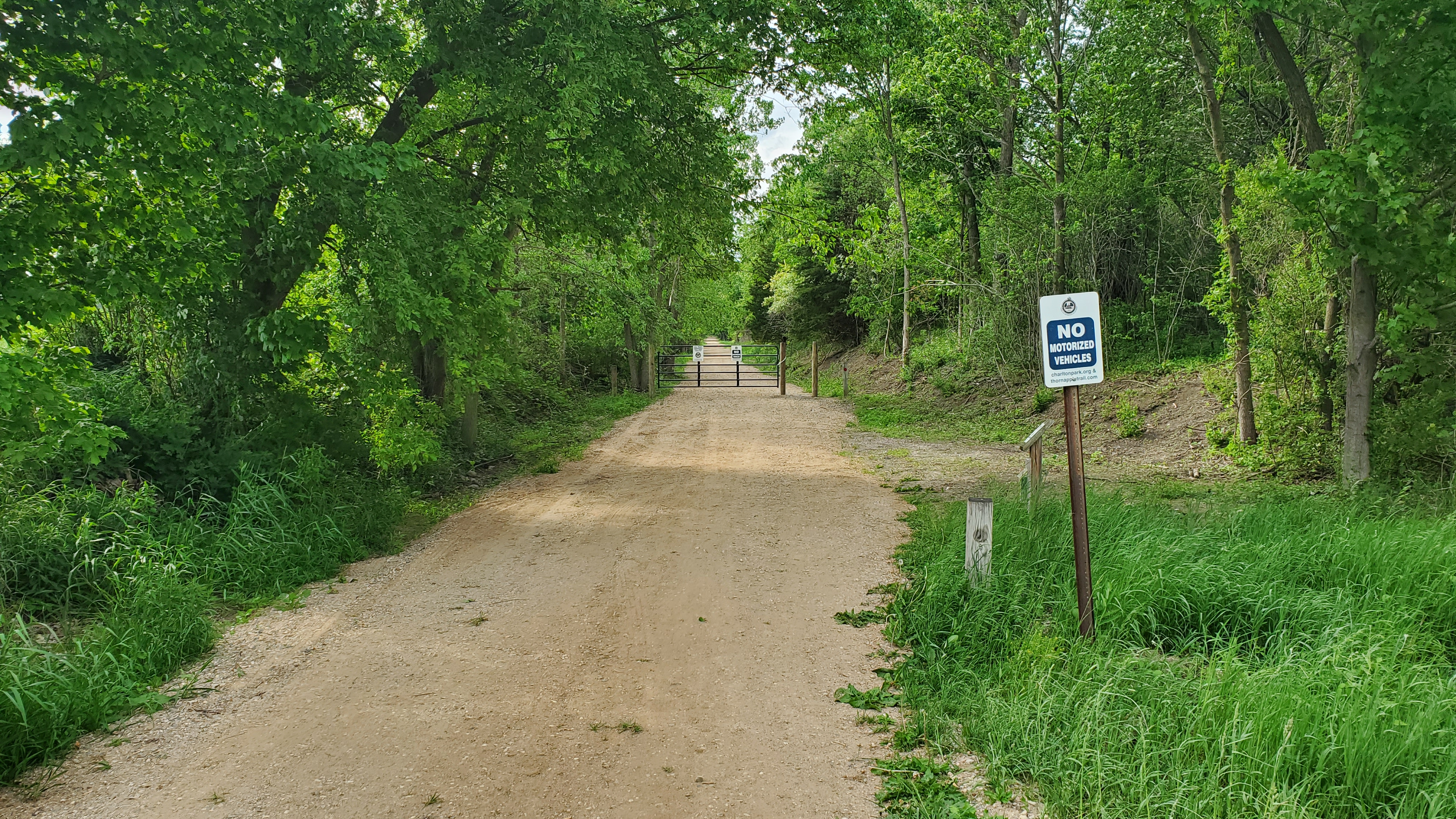
Looking north-west at the trailhead on Stimson Road.

Headed south across 108th St, the trail surface transitions from paved asphalt to graded dirt before ending at Stimson Rd. The trail section between Stimson Rd and Crane Rd is currently private property and is in the planning/proposal stage. Trail users in this area must navigate an on-road segment on Stimson Rd, heading south to M-37 and then east on Crane Rd across the Thornapple River.

After crossing the river on Crane Rd the trail picks up again heading along the banks of the Thornapple River and crossing over Main St in Middleville. A section of the trail south of Middleville is closed in November for hunting season. The trail continues south along the river through some wetlands, eventually crossing the river on an old converted rail bridge, before reaching Irving at McCann Rd where the trail changes from asphalt to grass. It then continues for another 2 miles before ending at private property on Irving Rd. The section between Irving Rd and Hastings is currently in the planning/proposal stage.

The trail within Hastings city limits has been completed and connects to both Tyden Park and Bliss Riverfront Park. To the east of Hastings, there are multiple trail sections divided by private property, comprising approximately 10 miles of mostly grass and some paved trail separated by 4 miles of private property. These sections are currently in the planning/proposal stage.

Currently, there is a grass trail starting at Greggs Crossing Rd, extending southeast along the Thornapple River. It then follows alongside M-79 briefly before turning northeast through Nashville.

The path through Nashville predominantly traces the old railroad's northeasterly route. With the exception of a brief 1000 ft paved segment of trail west of Nashville over Quaker Brook, the trail remains grass until reaching Maple Valley High School.

=== Eaton ===
After leaving Nashville and crossing Reed St the trail continues northeast, entering Eaton County. The trail continues to Maple Valley High School where the trail changes from grass to asphalt. Continuing its course the trail crosses the Thornapple River, again on another converted rail bridge, before turning slightly south, ultimately arriving at the trail terminus in Vermontville.

== Trailheads ==
County	Location	Parking Surface	Amenities	Coordinates
Kent	Northwest terminus (Kalamazoo Ave. & 44th St.)	None	None	42.883325°N 85.625771°W
Kent	Bowen Station Park	Paved	Restrooms and water	42.881916°N 85.623128°W
Kent	Stauffer Station Park	Paved	Restrooms and water	42.868779°N 85.606731°W
Kent	Wing Station Trailhead	Paved	Water	42.856205°N 85.590652°W
Kent	Caledonia Lakeside Park	Paved	Restrooms, water, picnic tables, and covered shelter	42.793012°N 85.517011°W
Kent	Downtown Caledonia	Street Parking	Downtown Caledonia	42.789278°N 85.515521°W
Kent	108th Street	Dirt, limited parking	None	42.768767°N 85.491459°W
Barry	Stimson Road	Dirt, limited parking	None	42.760786°N 85.481808°W
Barry	Trail Segment Unfinished; Approx. 2 1/2 mile gap			
Barry	Crane Road	Paved	None	42.724863°N 85.467986°W
Barry	Downtown Middleville	Paved	Downtown Middleville, restrooms, water, picnic tables, and covered shelter	42.712419°N 85.465973°W
Barry	Irving Trailhead (McCann Rd)	Dirt	None	42.687213°N 85.417672°W
Barry	Trail Segment Unfinished; Approx. 5 mile gap			
Barry	Apple Street Riverfront Trailhead	Paved	None	42.649790°N 85.295425°W
Barry	Tyden Park	Paved	Downtown Hastings, restrooms, and water	42.652078°N 85.292224°W
Barry	Bliss Riverfront Park	Dirt	None	42.642172°N 85.270101°W
Barry	Trail Segment Unfinished; Multiple unconnected segments of trail; Approx. 4 mile gap			
Barry	Downtown Nashville	Street Parking	Downtown Nashville	42.600819°N 85.093639°W
Eaton	Maple Valley High School	Paved	Restrooms and water	42.612208°N 85.055922°W
Eaton	Southeast terminus (Vermontville)	None	None	42.617039°N 85.026970°W
