= Byron Township, Michigan =

- Civil township
- Motto: "A Community on the Move"
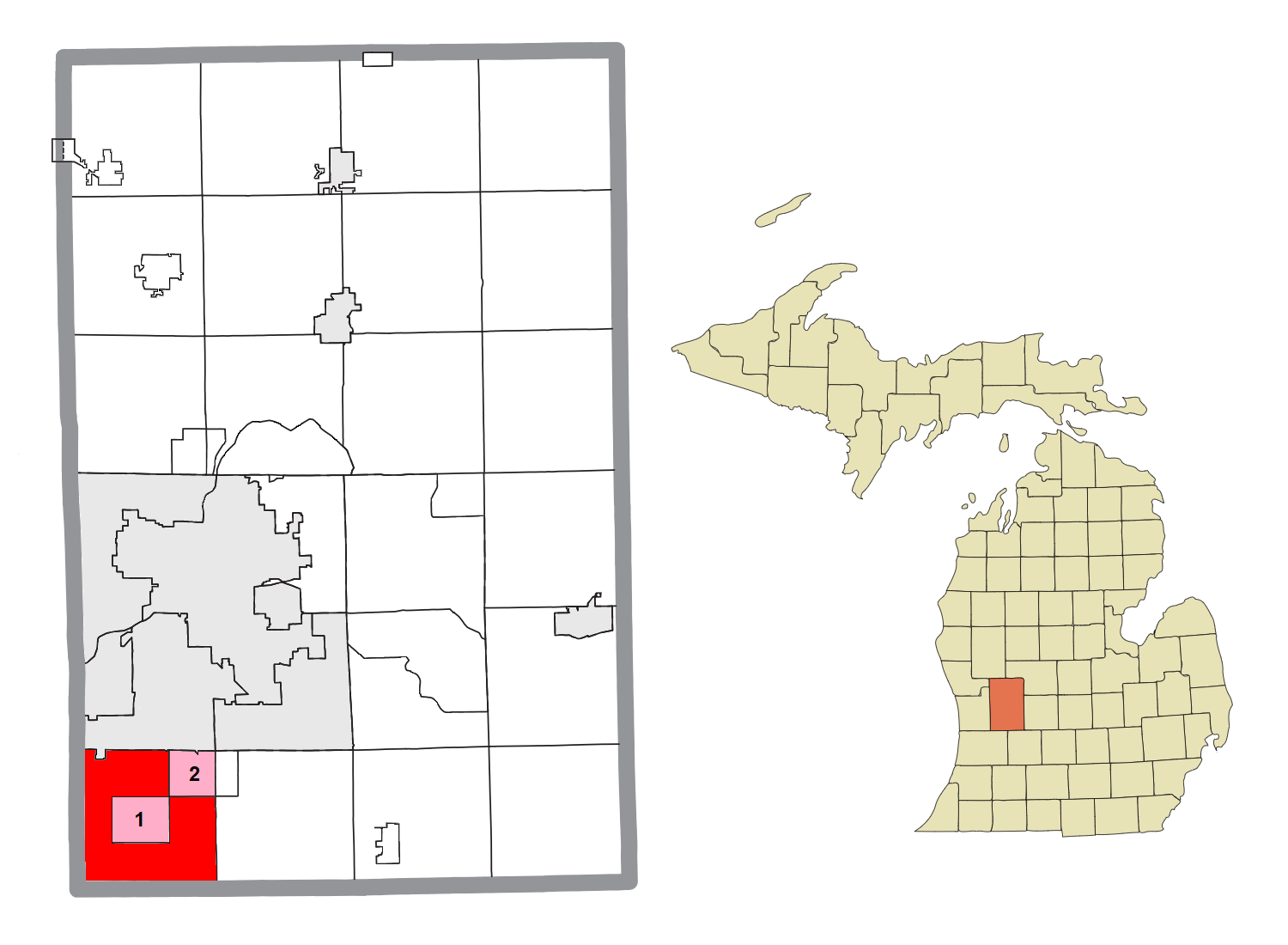
- Location within Kent County and the administered CDPs of Byron Center (1) and portion of Cutlerville (2) (pink)

- Location within the state of Michigan Location within the United States
- Coordinates: 42°48′45″N 85°43′26″W
- Country: United States
- State: Michigan
- County: Kent
- Established: 1836

Government
  - Supervisor: Amos Tillema
  - Clerk: Peggy Sattler

Area
  - Total: 36.17 sq mi (93.68 km^{2})
  - Land: 36.10 sq mi (93.50 km^{2})
  - Water: 0.069 sq mi (0.18 km^{2})
- Elevation: 738 ft (225 m)

Population (2020)
  - Total: 26,927
  - Density: 745.9/sq mi (288.0/km^{2})
- Time zone: UTC-5 (Eastern (EST))
  - Summer (DST): UTC-4 (EDT)
- ZIP code(s): 49315 (Byron Center); 49348 (Wayland); 49418 (Grandville); 49548 (Grand Rapids)
- Area code: 616
- FIPS code: 26-081-12240
- GNIS feature ID: 1626016
- Website: Official website

Byron Township is a civil township of Kent County in the U.S. state of Michigan. The population was 26,927 at the 2020 census, an increase from 20,317 at the 2010 census.

Byron Township is part of the Grand Rapids metropolitan area and is located just southwest of the city of Grand Rapids.

== Communities ==
- Byron Center is an unincorporated community and census-designated place at the center of the township. The Byron Center 49315 ZIP Code serves most of the township.
- Carlisle (or West Carlisle) is mostly historical community in the township at 42°49′35″N 85°41′00″W. Carlisle was a station on the Grand Rapids and Indiana Railroad. A post office named "West Carlisle" operated here from March 1884 until September 1910.
- Corinth is an unincorporated community in the southeast part of the township on the boundary with Gaines Township.
- Cutlerville is an unincorporated community and census-designated place in the northeast of the township, with part of the CDP extending east into Gaines Township.
- North Byron is an unincorporated community near the northern boundary of the township at 42°50′42″N 85°43′58″W. It began as a settlement named "Scudderville" on Rush Creek with a station on the Lake Shore and Michigan Southern Railway. It was named for Henry W. Scudder, a local landowner. A post office named "North Byron" operated from October 1862 to December 1879 and from March 1894 to September 1903.
- North Dorr is a small community at the boundary between Byron Township and Dorr Township in Allegan County to the south.
- Ross is a mostly historical community in the southeast part of the township at 42°46′57″N 85°41′40″W. Ross began as a depot on the Grand Rapids and Indiana Railroad and was first named "Ross Station". It was platted by William Thornton for William Ross in 1871. A post office was established in June 1871 with Daniel Ross as the first postmaster.

== History ==
Byron Township was established in 1836.

== Geography ==
According to the U.S. Census Bureau, the township has a total area of 36.17 square miles (93.68 km^{2}), of which 36.10 square miles (93.50 km^{2}) is land and 0.07 square miles (0.18 km^{2}) (0.19%) is water.

=== Major highways ===
- US 131 runs south–north near the eastern edge of the township.
- M-6 runs west–east near the northern edge of the township and has an interchange with U.S. Route 131.

== Demographics ==
As of the census of 2020, there were 26,933 people, the racial makeup of the city was 81.1% Non-Hispanic White, 4.2% Black or African American, 2.7% Asian, 0.2% Native American, and 6.6% from two or more races. Hispanic or Latino people of any race were 6.6% of the population.

As of the census of 2000, there were 17,553 people, 6,454 households, and 4,711 families residing in the township. The population density was 480.1 inhabitants per square mile (185.4/km^{2}). There were 6,712 housing units at an average density of 183.6 per square mile (70.9/km^{2}). The racial makeup of the township was 94.79% White, 1.21% African American, 0.32% Native American, 1.06% Asian, 0.02% Pacific Islander, 1.17% from other races, and 1.42% from two or more races. Hispanic or Latino of any race were 2.77% of the population.

There were 6,454 households, out of which 36.4% had children under the age of 18 living with them, 61.2% were married couples living together, 8.5% had a female householder with no husband present, and 27.0% were non-families. 21.3% of all households were made up of individuals, and 6.6% had someone living alone who was 65 years of age or older. The average household size was 2.71 and the average family size was 3.18.

In the township the population was spread out, with 29.0% under the age of 18, 9.0% from 18 to 24, 30.2% from 25 to 44, 20.9% from 45 to 64, and 10.9% who were 65 years of age or older. The median age was 34 years. For every 100 females, there were 100.0 males. For every 100 females age 18 and over, there were 96.7 males.

The median income for a household in the township was $49,672, and the median income for a family was $56,701. Males had a median income of $42,664 versus $26,449 for females. The per capita income for the township was $24,206. About 2.5% of families and 4.1% of the population were below the poverty line, including 4.4% of those under age 18 and 4.0% of those age 65 or over.

== Economy ==
Michigan grocery distributor and retail operator SpartanNash (formerly known as Spartan Stores) is headquartered in the township.

== Education ==
Byron Township is served by four different public school districts. The majority of the township is served by Byron Center Public Schools, while a small portion of the northeast corner in Cutlerville is served by Kentwood Public Schools. A very small portion of the northern edge of the township is served by Grandville Public Schools, and another very small portion on the southern edge of the township is served by Wayland Union Schools.
