= Byron Center, Michigan =

- Census-designated place (CDP) & unincorporated community
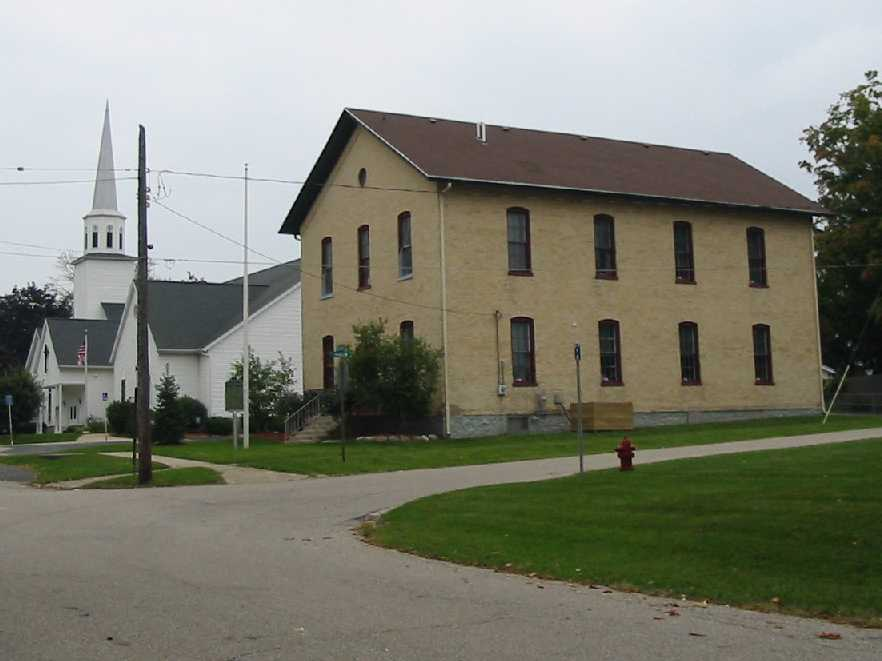
- Byron Area Historic Museum in Kent County

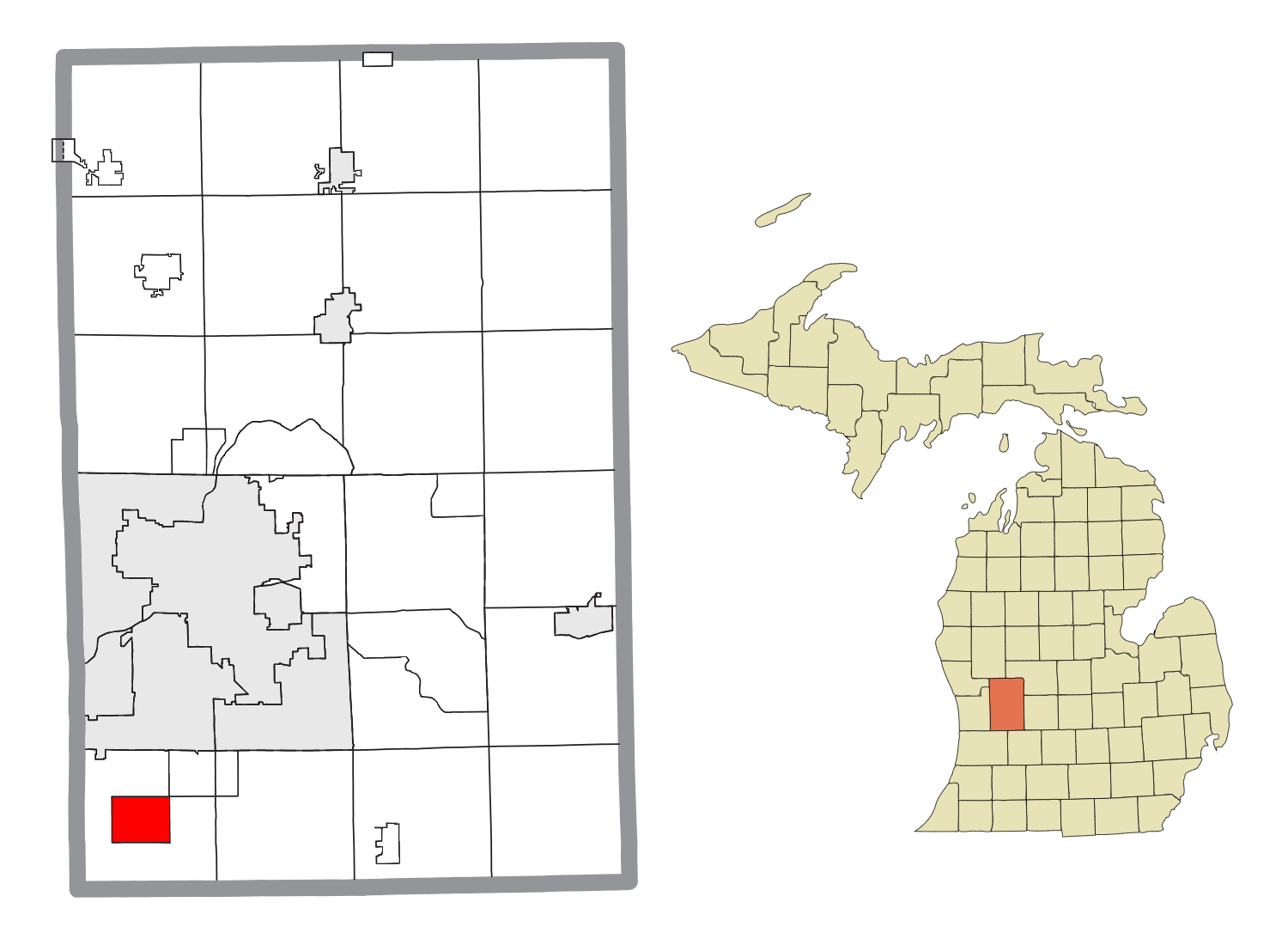
- Location within Kent County

- Location within the state of Michigan Location within the United States
- Coordinates: 42°48′44″N 85°43′22″W
- Country: United States
- State: Michigan
- County: Kent
- Township: Byron

Area
  - Total: 5.10 sq mi (13.21 km^{2})
  - Land: 5.08 sq mi (13.16 km^{2})
  - Water: 0.019 sq mi (0.05 km^{2})
- Elevation: 745 ft (227 m)

Population (2020)
  - Total: 7,431
  - Density: 1,461.8/sq mi (564.42/km^{2})
- Time zone: UTC-5 (Eastern (EST))
  - Summer (DST): UTC-4 (EDT)
- ZIP code(s): 49315
- Area code: 616
- FIPS code: 26-12280
- GNIS feature ID: 0622409

Byron Center is an unincorporated community and census-designated place (CDP) in Kent County in the U.S. state of Michigan. The population was 7,431 at the 2020 census, which is a significant increase from a population of 5,822 at the 2010 census. Byron Center is located within Byron Township.

Byron Center is home of the Byron Center Bulldogs, and the Byron Center Public Schools district. There are 4 elementary schools in Byron Center. Marshall Elementary, Countryside Elementary, Brown Elementary, and Heritage Elementary. The 5/6 building is named the Nickels Intermediate School. The 7/8 building is West Middle School and the high school (9-12) is Byron Center High School.

As an unincorporated community, Byron Center has no legal autonomy of its own but has its own post office with the 49315 ZIP Code, which serves a much larger area within several surrounding townships.

== Geography ==
According to the U.S. Census Bureau, Byron Center has a total area of 5.10 square miles (13.21 km^{2}), of which 5.08 square miles (13.16 km^{2}) is land and 0.02 square miles (0.05 km^{2}) (0.39%) is water.

== Demographics ==
Historical population
Census	Pop.	Note	%±
2000	3,777		—
2010	5,822		54.1%
2020	7,431		27.6%
U.S. Decennial Census

=== 2020 census ===
As of the 2020 census, Byron Center had a population of 7,431. The median age was 39.5 years. 28.1% of residents were under the age of 18 and 19.6% of residents were 65 years of age or older. For every 100 females there were 91.9 males, and for every 100 females age 18 and over there were 89.1 males age 18 and over.

93.4% of residents lived in urban areas, while 6.6% lived in rural areas.

There were 2,568 households in Byron Center, of which 36.3% had children under the age of 18 living in them. Of all households, 71.0% were married-couple households, 8.6% were households with a male householder and no spouse or partner present, and 18.6% were households with a female householder and no spouse or partner present. About 18.4% of all households were made up of individuals and 12.2% had someone living alone who was 65 years of age or older.

There were 2,652 housing units, of which 3.2% were vacant. The homeowner vacancy rate was 1.3% and the rental vacancy rate was 6.5%.

Racial composition as of the 2020 census
Race	Number	Percent
White	6,636	89.3%
Black or African American	85	1.1%
American Indian and Alaska Native	19	0.3%
Asian	202	2.7%
Native Hawaiian and Other Pacific Islander	0	0.0%
Some other race	104	1.4%
Two or more races	385	5.2%
Hispanic or Latino (of any race)	276	3.7%

=== Income and poverty ===
The median income for a household in Byron Center was $102,376. The per capita income was $39,381. About 2.1% of the population is below the poverty line.

=== 2010 census ===
As of the 2010 census Byron Center had a population of 5,822. The population was 93.7% non-Hispanic white, 0.9% African-American, 0.4% Native American, 1.0% Asian, 0.1% non-Hispanics of some other race, 1.4% reporting two or more races and 2.7% Hispanic.

=== 2000 census ===
As of the census of 2000, there were 3,777 people, 1,322 households, and 1,040 families residing in Byron Center. The population density was 751.8 inhabitants per square mile (290.3/km^{2}). There were 1,374 housing units at an average density of 273.5 per square mile (105.6/km^{2}). The racial makeup of the CDP was 97.93% White, 0.11% African American, 0.19% Native American, 0.61% Asian, 0.03% Pacific Islander, 0.21% from other races, and 0.93% from two or more races. Hispanic or Latino of any race were 0.95% of the population.

There were 1,322 households, out of which 43.6% had children under the age of 18 living with them, 69.5% were married couples living together, 7.3% had a female householder with no husband present, and 21.3% were non-families. 19.4% of all households were made up of individuals, and 9.6% had someone living alone who was 65 years of age or older. The average household size was 2.82 and the average family size was 3.26.

Around 32.5% of Byron Center residents were under the age of 18, 6.5% from 18 to 24, 30.6% from 25 to 44, 18.9% from 45 to 64, and 11.5% were 65 years of age or older. The median age was 34 years. For every 100 females, there were 90.6 males. For every 100 females age 18 and over, there were 89.0 males.

The median income for a household in Byron Center was $58,508, and the median income for a family was $65,882. Males had a median income of $50,517 versus $28,043 for females. The per capita income was $29,028. About 1.9% of families and 3.2% of the population were below the poverty line, including 6.7% of those age 65 or over.
