= Wayland, Michigan =

- City
- Location of Wayland, Michigan
- Coordinates: 42°40′28″N 85°38′44″W
- Country: United States
- State: Michigan
- County: Allegan

Area
  - Total: 3.01 sq mi (7.79 km^{2})
  - Land: 2.96 sq mi (7.67 km^{2})
  - Water: 0.046 sq mi (0.12 km^{2})
- Elevation: 226 ft (69 m)

Population (2020)
  - Total: 4,435
  - Density: 1,497.1/sq mi (578.05/km^{2})
- Time zone: UTC-5 (Eastern (EST))
  - Summer (DST): UTC-4 (EDT)
- ZIP code: 49348
- Area code: 269
- FIPS code: 26-84880
- GNIS feature ID: 1615899
- Website: www.cityofwayland.org

Wayland is a city in Allegan County in the U.S. state of Michigan. The population was 4,435 at the 2020 census.

The city is located at the northwest corner of Wayland Township, but is politically independent. The city has also incorporated a portion of land in the south of adjacent Leighton Township. U.S. Route 131 forms the western boundary of the city. The city is home to OpenRoad Brewery, as well as several local restaurants and businesses.

== History ==
About two hundred years ago, the area now known as Wayland, Michigan was inhabited by the Match-E-Be-Nash-She-Wish Band of the Pottawatomi, a Native American tribe in Michigan. The tribe lived in settled villages, hunted game, and farmed and harvested corn and wild rice, in addition to making maple sugar tree sap. The tribe is federally recognized and is headquartered in nearby Wayland Township. It owns the Gun Lake Casino, opened in 2011.

The area began changing under pressure of European-American development. By 1826 the land had been surveyed for settlement in United States style. Colonel Isaac Barnes, attracted by the extensive forests of pine and hardwoods, purchased a tract of land along the Rabbit River and began operating a mill producing lumber and wooden shingles, giving the area its first name, Lumberton.

In 1837, the Barnes family arrived and began clearing the land for farming, and by the 1840s, several more families had settled in the area. This growth brought enough children to the area to justify building the first American-style school in 1844.

In 1855 a road was built to connect the two larger towns of Grand Rapids and Kalamazoo, running directly through Chamber's Corners, the main intersection in the city. This area is now known by that name. This busy road led to increased commerce, and business in the form of dairy farms and factories, which led to further growth over time.

The area was officially named Wayland in 1868 after a town in New York, as many migrants had come from that state.

== Geography ==
According to the United States Census Bureau, the city has a total area of 3.03 square miles (7.85 km^{2}), of which 2.98 square miles (7.72 km^{2}) is land and 0.05 square miles (0.13 km^{2}) is water.

== Demographics ==
Historical population
Census	Pop.	Note	%±
1870	585		—
1880	546		−6.7%
1890	523		−4.2%
1900	619		18.4%
1910	725		17.1%
1920	853		17.7%
1930	1,013		18.8%
1940	1,005		−0.8%
1950	1,591		58.3%
1960	2,019		26.9%
1970	2,054		1.7%
1980	2,023		−1.5%
1990	2,751		36.0%
2000	3,939		43.2%
2010	4,079		3.6%
2020	4,435		8.7%
U.S. Decennial Census

=== 2020 census ===
As of the 2020 census, Wayland had a population of 4,435. The median age was 34.2 years. 26.6% of residents were under the age of 18 and 13.3% of residents were 65 years of age or older. For every 100 females there were 94.5 males, and for every 100 females age 18 and over there were 90.1 males age 18 and over.

100.0% of residents lived in urban areas, while 0.0% lived in rural areas.

There were 1,711 households in Wayland, of which 34.3% had children under the age of 18 living in them. Of all households, 43.5% were married-couple households, 18.5% were households with a male householder and no spouse or partner present, and 29.3% were households with a female householder and no spouse or partner present. About 29.3% of all households were made up of individuals and 14.2% had someone living alone who was 65 years of age or older.

There were 1,775 housing units, of which 3.6% were vacant. The homeowner vacancy rate was 0.8% and the rental vacancy rate was 3.6%.

Racial composition as of the 2020 census
Race	Number	Percent
White	3,931	88.6%
Black or African American	57	1.3%
American Indian and Alaska Native	54	1.2%
Asian	22	0.5%
Native Hawaiian and Other Pacific Islander	0	0.0%
Some other race	66	1.5%
Two or more races	305	6.9%
Hispanic or Latino (of any race)	213	4.8%

=== 2010 census ===
As of the census of 2010, there were 4,079 people, 1,555 households, and 1,051 families residing in the city. The population density was 1,368.8 inhabitants per square mile (528.5/km^{2}). There were 1,751 housing units at an average density of 587.6 per square mile (226.9/km^{2}). The racial makeup of the city was 95.0% White, 0.3% African American, 0.8% Native American, 0.3% Asian, 0.9% from other races, and 2.6% from two or more races. Hispanic or Latino of any race were 3.9% of the population.

There were 1,555 households, of which 40.1% had children under the age of 18 living with them, 45.4% were married couples living together, 16.5% had a female householder with no husband present, 5.7% had a male householder with no wife present, and 32.4% were non-families. 25.2% of all households were made up of individuals, and 8.9% had someone living alone who was 65 years of age or older. The average household size was 2.56 and the average family size was 3.04.

The median age in the city was 33.3 years. 28.7% of residents were under the age of 18; 10% were between the ages of 18 and 24; 26.6% were from 25 to 44; 23.1% were from 45 to 64; and 11.7% were 65 years of age or older. The gender makeup of the city was 47.0% male and 53.0% female.

=== 2000 census ===
As of the census of 2000, there were 3,939 people, 1,466 households, and 1,027 families residing in the city. The population density was 1,363.8 inhabitants per square mile (526.6/km^{2}). There were 1,591 housing units at an average density of 550.8 per square mile (212.7/km^{2}). The racial makeup of the city was 96.75% White, 0.63% African American, 0.91% Native American, 0.15% Asian, 0.05% Pacific Islander, 0.63% from other races, and 0.86% from two or more races. Hispanic or Latino of any race were 2.08% of the population.

There were 1,466 households, out of which 41.2% had children under the age of 18 living with them, 53.6% were married couples living together, 12.6% had a female householder with no husband present, and 29.9% were non-families. 23.7% of all households were made up of individuals, and 9.5% had someone living alone who was 65 years of age or older. The average household size was 2.61 and the average family size was 3.11.

In the city, the population was spread out, with 30.4% under the age of 18, 10.6% from 18 to 24, 33.2% from 25 to 44, 14.6% from 45 to 64, and 11.2% who were 65 years of age or older. The median age was 31 years. For every 100 females, there were 90.5 males. For every 100 females age 18 and over, there were 83.2 males.

The median income for a household in the city was $41,852, and the median income for a family was $50,298. Males had a median income of $35,811 versus $25,786 for females. The per capita income for the city was $18,077. About 6.7% of families and 7.9% of the population were below the poverty line, including 8.6% of those under age 18 and 8.9% of those age 65 or over.

== Education ==
K-12 public education is provided by Wayland Union Schools.

== Transportation ==
=== Major highways ===
US 131 runs north–south through the city, linking with Kalamazoo to the south and Grand Rapids to the north
