= George Bardeen =

George Edward Bardeen Sr. (10 Nov 1850 – 26 Jan 1924), a long-time resident of Otsego, Michigan, USA, was a businessman and state-level politician. He owned and operated the Bardeen and the Mac-Sim-Bar paper mills in Otsego, the Otsego Independents semi-professional baseball team, and was financially instrumental in the founding of Olivet College.

Bardeen and other investors started up the city of Otsego's first paper mill in 1887, reducing the availability of spring water and thus shutting down the town's Mineral Springs Bath House.

In 1900, Bardeen was the state's 4th District delegate to the Republican National Committee; attending the Republican National Convention in Philadelphia that year. In 1907, he served as a member of Michigan's Republican State Central Committee.

In 1901, Bardeen entered a venture to help start the Kalamazoo Stove Company. His partners in this venture were Edward Woodbury, son of the late Jeremiah P. Woodbury, Kalamazoo's wealthiest 19th-century industrialist and banker; the Dewing brothers: William S., James, and Charles; and other prominent local businessmen. Taking advantage of the recently established Rural Free Delivery postal service that brought mail-order catalogs to rural homes, these investors sold their products directly to customers, without retail middlemen. The company slogan was "A Kalamazoo ~ Direct to You."

In 1902, Bardeen was among the first team owners in white baseball to allow African-American players to be integrated. He signed Negro league baseball pitching star Andrew Rube Foster, who had just been released from the Chicago Union Giants following a performance slump, to play for him that season. Foster's performance in Otsego led to his being signed the following season by the Philadelphia Cuban X-Giants.

== Family and progeny ==
George Bardeen, son of William and Mary Ann (Farnsworth) Bardeen, was born in Fitchburg, Massachusetts. He married first in 1871 to Abbie Harriet Carder (1853–1910), daughter of Edwin Alexander & Sarah Anne (Green) Carder, and second in 1911 to Florence B. Geib (1877–1949), daughter of John Jacob and Sarah Elizabeth (Feller) Geib.

Abbie bore him a daughter, Margery (29 May 1872 – 23 Mar 1924), whom he pre-deceased by only 2 months, and two sons, Ralph Howard (1881–1883) and George Edward Bardeen Jr. (1888–1963).

Margery married Minet Burton McClellan (1863–1921), son of W. W. and Mable J. (Ferguson) McClellan. He was one of her father's partners in the Mac-Sim-Bar paper company. They had two daughters, Margery Bardeen McClellan (1898–1958) and Dorothy McClellan (1901–1950). Neither ever married.

George Jr. married Lucille Lane (1888–1977), daughter of Moses Henry and Ida E. (Lay) Lane. They had two children, named eponymously George Edward (1913–1977) and Lucille, and a third named Burton Lane (1918–1981) after George Sr's father (who was known by his middle name).

George III married Eleanor Jane Settle (1912–1976), daughter of Jesse Ewing and Daisy Elizabeth (Oliver) Settle. Burton served in World War II 1941–1946, getting married while on a furlough in 1943 to Anne Trenor Hannan (1917–1993), daughter of Michael and Mary (McElroy) Hannan.
