= Hal W. Vincent =

US Marine Corps general (1927–2015)

Hal Wellman Vincent
- Born: September 24, 1927; Pontiac, Michigan, U.S.
- Died: April 28, 2015 (aged 87); San Juan Capistrano, California, U.S.
- Burial place: Miramar National Cemetery
- Military career
- Allegiance: United States of America
- Branch: United States Marine Corps
- Service years: 1945–1981
- Rank: Major general
- Commands: 2nd Marine Aircraft Wing; Marine Combat Crew Readiness Training Group 10; VMFA-312
- Awards: Legion of Merit

Hal Wellman Vincent (September 24, 1927 – April 28, 2015) was a naval aviator in the United States Marine Corps who retired at the rank of major general. A veteran of the Vietnam War, he commanded at the squadron, group and wing level during his career. He flew more than 10,000 hours in over 165 different aircraft and was the first Marine Aviator to fly Mach 2.0.

== Biography ==
=== Early years ===
Hal Wellman Vincent was born on 24 September 1927 in Pontiac, Michigan to Harold and Glenda (Wellman) Vincent. He was an Eagle Scout and graduated from Otsego High School in Otsego, Michigan in 1945. That summer he joined the United States Navy's V-5 Naval Aviation Cadet Program and during the next year studied at both Colgate University and Western Michigan College. In 1946 he was accepted to the United States Naval Academy in Annapolis, Maryland. During his time at the academy he was the first undefeated welterweight boxing champion during the years 1947 - 1950. He graduated in 1950 with a Bachelor of Science in Electrical engineering.

=== 1950s ===
He was commissioned a 2nd Lieutenant in the United States Marine Corps in June 1950 upon his graduation from the Naval Academy. He attended The Basic School, at Marine Corps Base Quantico, Virginia from August 1950 until March 1951. His first assignment with the Fleet Marine Force was as a rifle and machine gun platoon commander with the 2nd Battalion, 8th Marines, 2nd Marine Division at Marine Corps Base Camp Lejeune, North Carolina. In January 1952, he was assigned to flight training at Naval Air Station Pensacola, Florida. After additional training at Naval Air Station Corpus Christi, Texas and Naval Air Station Kingsville, Texas he was designated a Naval Aviator 8 April 1953.

From July to October 1953 he flew F2H-4 Banshees with VMF-214 at Marine Corps Air Station El Toro, California. He was transferred overseas for duty with the 1st Marine Aircraft Wing in Korea. He flew F9F Panthers with VMF-115 and served as assistant operations officer of Marine Aircraft Group 13 (MAG-13) from November 1953 until December 1954.

Following his return to the U.S., Then Captain Vincent began training at the United States Naval Test Pilot School at Naval Air Station Patuxent River, Maryland in January 1955. He then served for two years as a test pilot with the Flight Test Division. On 7 October 1958 he became the first Marine Corps pilot to fly Mach 2.0. In 1958, he received air instruction at the Navy Fleet Air Gunnery Unit, at Naval Air Facility El Centro, California, then served for two years with the 3d Marine Aircraft Wing, at MCAS El Toro, California, as Assistance Operations Officer with VMFA-334 and VMFA-451 while flying the Vought F-8 Crusader. During this period, he also attended the United States Air Force Fighter Weapons School at Nellis Air Force Base, Nevada.

=== 1960s ===
From April 1960 until April 1962, he was assigned to Naval Air Weapons Station China Lake, California, as the Conventional Weapons Project Officer and test pilot with Air Development Squadron 5 (VX-5). In this role he was responsible for the development of tactics and delivery methods for both nuclear weapons and conventional munitions. Of note during this tour he performed a demonstration for then President of the United States John F. Kennedy. Reassigned to MCAS El Toro in April 1962, he served as the Operations Officer and Executive Officer for VMFA-314. The squadron became the first Marine squadron to transition to the new F-4B Phantom II. During this tour he also took part in their Western Pacific deployment to Naval Air Station Atsugi, Japan from April to November 1964. In November 1964, he became the aviation member of the Amphibious Warfare Presentation Team, which operated from MCB Quantico, Virginia. He assumed duties as Assistant Chief of the Aviation Branch at the Education Center, July 1966 until June 1967. During the tour he was awarded a Certificate of Equivalency for completion of the Marine Corps Command and Staff College, and promoted to lieutenant colonel. From 7 August 1967 through 14 June 1968, he served as the Commanding Officer of VMFA-312, at Marine Corps Air Station Beaufort, South Carolina. From August 1968 until June 1969, then LtCol Vincent attended the Industrial College of the Armed Forces in Washington, D.C.

=== Vietnam & the 1970s ===
Following his graduation from ICAF, his next assignment was in Vietnam with the 1st Marine Aircraft Wing as Executive Officer of Marine Aircraft Group 13, based at the Chu Lai Air Base. During the tour, he flew 242 combat missions in eight types of fixed-wing and helicopter aircraft. He was promoted to colonel in August 1970, and the following month was transferred to Marine Corps Base Hawaii, where he served as Officer-in-Charge of the Aviation Maintenance/Management Branch, G-4 (Logistics) Section, Headquarters, Fleet Marine Force, Pacific. In July 1971, he assumed the position as Officer-in-Charge of the Aviation Weapons Systems Branch of the G-4 (logistics) Section. From June 1972 through May 1973, he served as Commanding Officer of Marine Combat Crew Readiness Training Group 10 at Marine Corps Air Station Yuma, Arizona. He returned to the 3d Marine Aircraft Wing in July 1973, and assumed duty as Chief of Staff.

=== Promotion to General and retirement ===
He was advanced to brigadier general on February 27, 1976, and assigned duties as Deputy Chief of Staff, Plans and Policy, Joint Exercises, Commander in Chief, Atlantic, at Norfolk, Va., in June 1976. On May 15, 1978, he was advanced to major general and assigned duty as Commanding General, 2d Marine Aircraft Wing, MCAS Cherry Point, North Carolina in June 1978. He assumed duty as Deputy Commander, Fleet Marine Force, Atlantic, Norfolk, Va., in August 1980. General Vincent served in this assignment until his retirement on 1 May 1981.

=== Later years, personal life and death ===
On 20 February 1987, a man attempted to plant a bomb inside the 1968 Dodge Dart that Vincent was driving outside of a Laguna Hills, California office building. The man, who had been involved in a lawsuit with Vincent over land in Oregon, was killed when the device prematurely exploded. At the time, Vincent was part owner of Double "O" Enterprises which sold NFL merchandise.

Later in life he got involved with raising quarter horses through his investment in a ranch in Ashland, Oregon. In 2005 he was awarded the Wright Brothers Master Pilot Award by the U.S. Federal Aviation Administration.. In April 2010, he was inducted into the Michigan Aviation Hall of Fame.

MajGen Vincent married Virginia "Ginny" Marie Bayler, the daughter of Walter Bayler on 9 June 1951 at the Naval Academy Chapel in Annapolis Maryland. They were married for 64 years and had three children, Deborah, David and Dale. He was a member of the Sons of the American Revolution, Society of Experimental Test Pilots, Early Pioneer Naval Aviators, and the Marine Corps Aviation Association. He died on April 28, 2015, in San Juan Capistrano, California and is buried at Miramar National Cemetery, California. His legacy is best summed up by the simple inscription on his tombstone:

HE WAS A
FIGHTER PILOT
LOVING HUSBAND
BEST DAD EVER

== Decorations ==
Shown is the ribbon bar of Major General Hal W. Vincent:
