= Hoosier cabinet =

Type of cupboard serving as a workstation

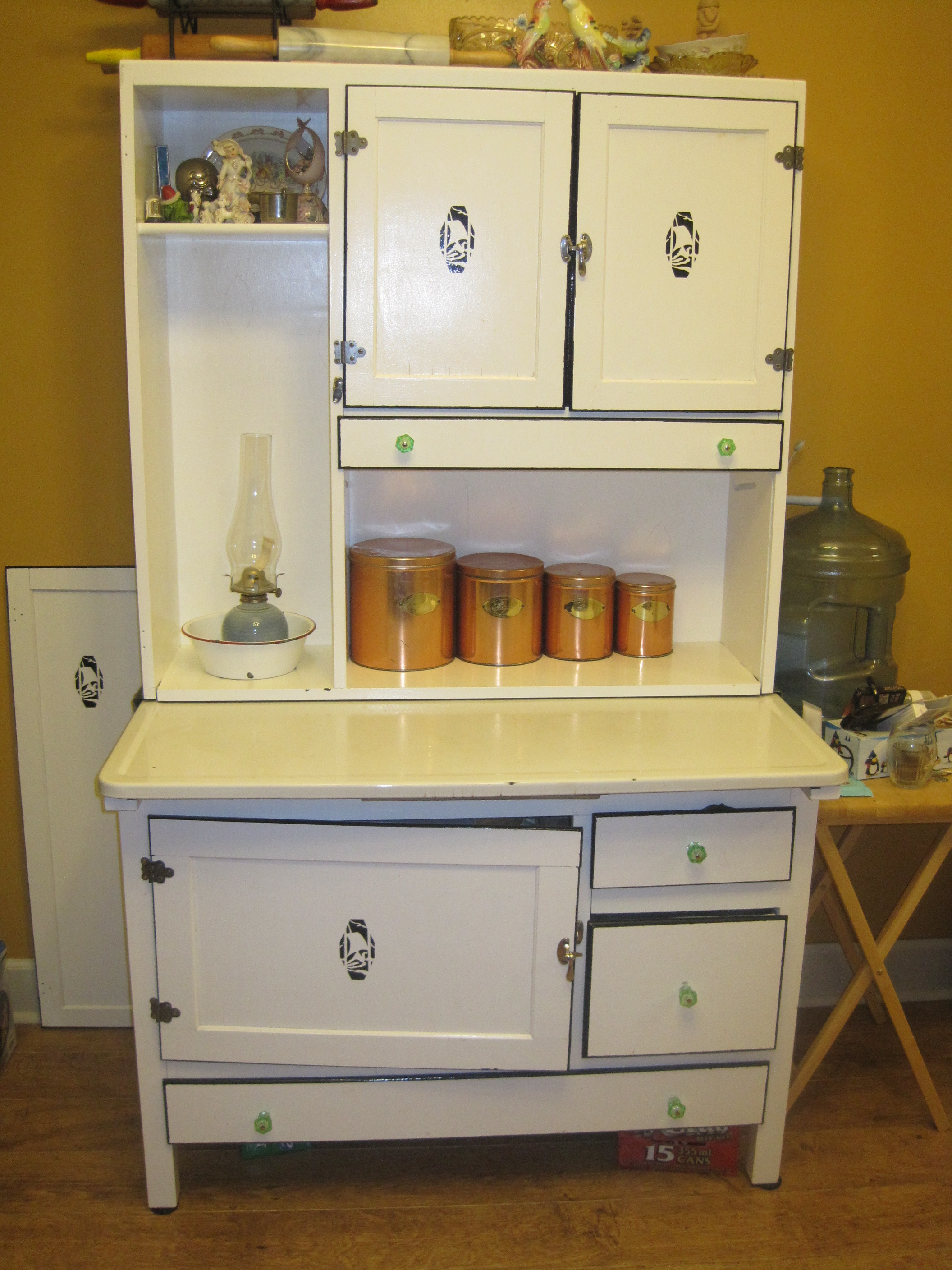
A Hoosier cabinet

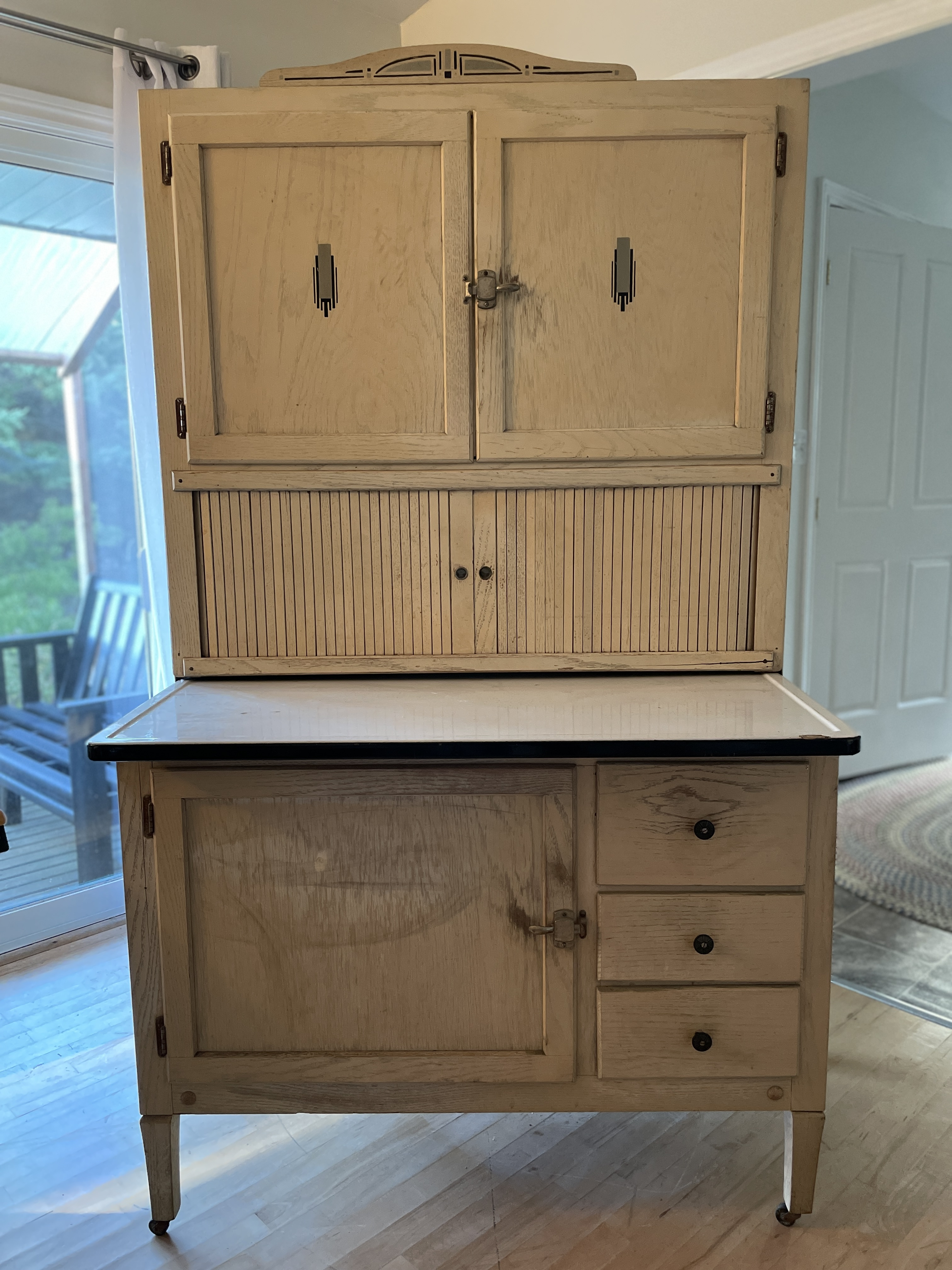
Original condition Hoosier-style cabinet

A Hoosier cabinet or Hoosier is a type of cupboard or free-standing kitchen cabinet that also serves as a workstation. It was popular in the first few decades of the 20th century in the United States, since most houses did not have built-in kitchen cabinetry. The Hoosier Manufacturing Co. of New Castle, Indiana, was one of the earliest and largest manufacturers of this product, causing the term "Hoosier cabinet" to become a generic term for that type of furniture. By 1920, the Hoosier Manufacturing Company had sold two million cabinets.

Hoosier-style cabinets were also made by dozens of other companies, mostly in or around Indiana. Some of the larger manufacturers were Campbell-Smith-Ritchie (Boone); Coppes Brothers and Zook (the Napanee); McDougall Company; and G. I. Sellers and Sons.

Hoosier cabinets evolved over the years to include more accessories and innovations that made life easier for home cooks. They peaked in popularity in the 1920s, then declined as homes began to be constructed with built-in kitchen cabinets and counter tops. The Hoosier Manufacturing Company was sold in 1942 and liquidated. Today, Hoosier cabinets are valued by antique collectors.

== Background ==
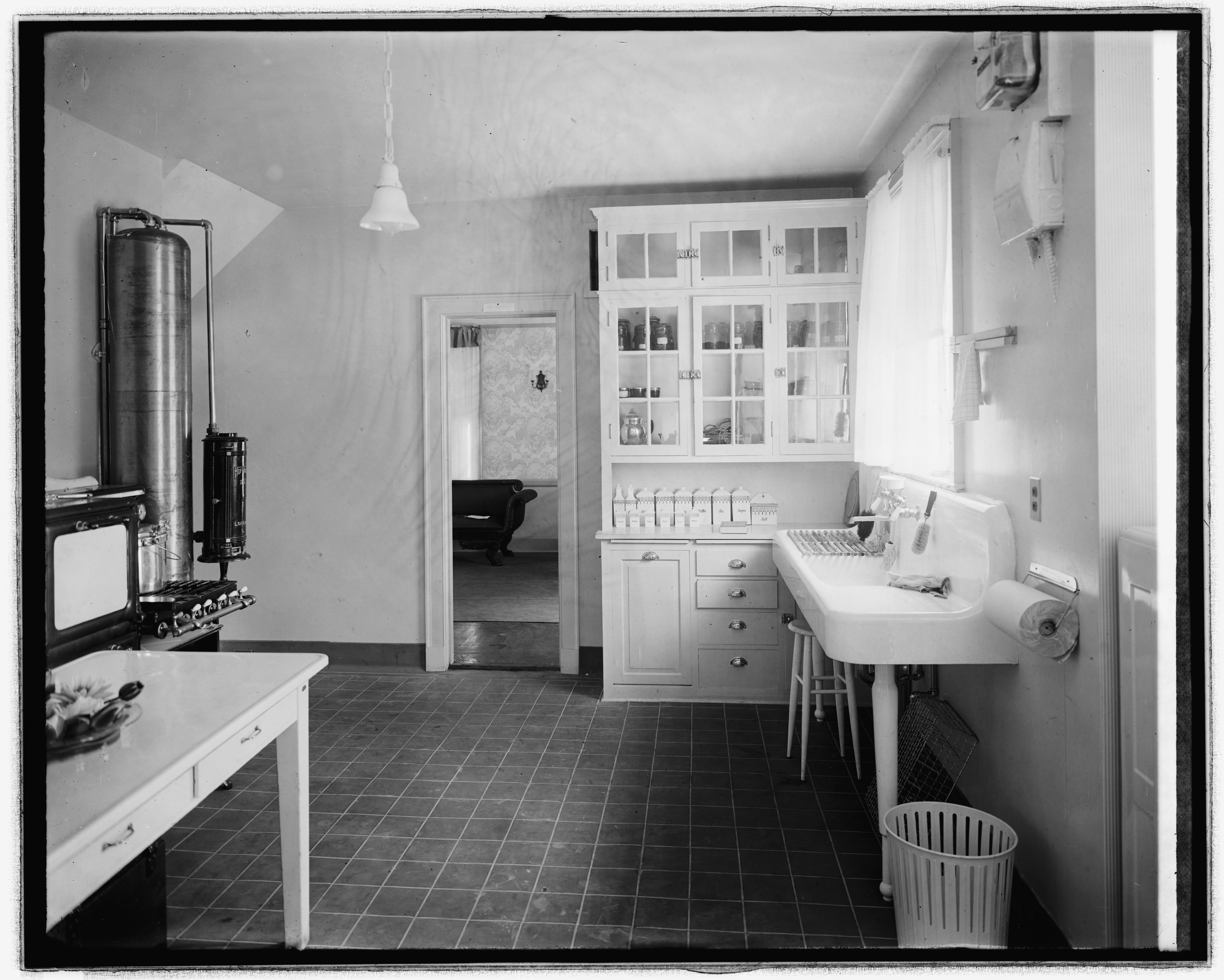
Kitchen in 1910–1920

From 1890 to 1930, more houses were built in the United States than in all of the country's prior years combined. Built-in kitchen cabinetry did not become a common furnishing until the late 1920s.

Around the 1890s, several furniture manufacturers in Indiana began selling a kitchen cabinet design with ingredient and equipment storage and an integrated work surface, allowing the home cook to prepare food in one place. The Hoosier Manufacturing Company was one of those. It's product was nationally promoted as a step-saver, and its popularity led to the term Hoosier cabinet becoming a generic term for that style of furniture.

Hoosier Manufacturing alone sold two million cabinets from its inception to 1920. Given that there were approximately 20 million households in the US at that time, as many as 10% of homes had Hoosier cabinets made by Hoosier Manufacturing, in addition to those with Hoosier cabinets made by competing companies.

Hoosier cabinets remained popular until the 1920s. By then new homes were being constructed with modern kitchens that included built-in cabinets, counter tops, and other fixtures. Some manufacturers diversified into built-in cabinets and kitchen furniture. The Great Depression made sales more difficult in the 1930s, and by 1935, Hoosier cabinets were considered "old fashioned". The two largest manufacturers, Hoosier Manufacturing and G. I. Sellers and Sons, closed in 1942 and 1950, respectively.

== Features ==
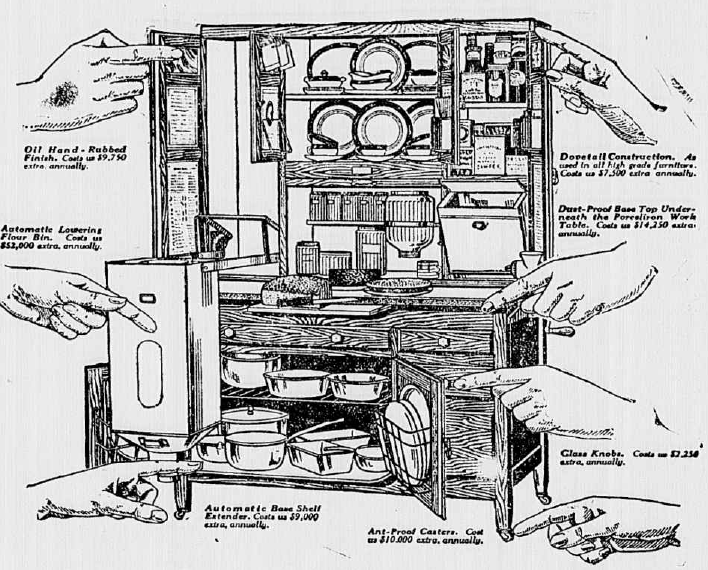
Drawing of a Hoosier cabinet made by Sellers

A Hoosier cabinet is a stand-alone kitchen cabinet, often on small casters. It is considered an embellishment of a baker's cabinet, which is a table with one or more bins underneath. A Hoosier has base cabinet topped with a small work surface (often an enamel-clad slide-out shelf) and a shallower hutch.

The majority of Hoosier cabinets are approximately 48 inches (120 cm) wide by 22 inches (56 cm) deep by 72 inches (180 cm) high. In addition to their storage capacity, they offer about 40 inches (100 cm) of flat work space that was not available in the standard kitchen of the early 20th century other than the kitchen table. A distinctive feature of the Hoosier cabinet is its many moving parts and accessories. They were originally equipped with various racks and other hardware to accommodate spices and staples. One particularly distinctive item is the combination flour-bin/sifter, a hopper that could be used without having to remove it from the cabinet. A similar sugar bin was also common. Additional accessories and innovations were added over the years. Special glass jars were manufactured to fit the cabinet and its racks. Original sets of Hoosier glassware consisted of coffee and tea canisters, a salt box, and four to eight spice jars. Some manufacturers also included a cracker jar. (Note: A major manufacturer of glassware for Hoosier cabinets, and replacement sets, was Sneath Glass Company of Hartford City, Indiana. A Sneath sales brochure lists 11-piece and 10-piece Hoosier sets, and two types of crystal glass sugar bins.) Colored glassware, ant-proof casters, and even ironing boards were added later. (Note: Hoosier Manufacturing advertised colored glassware and dishes for its Hoosier Beauty in the Saturday Evening Post in 1927. Sellers had ant-proof casters. Ironing boards were added by at least one manufacturer toward the end of the Hoosier cabinet's popularity.) Later models included cards with grocery shopping reminders and tips for meal planning.

== Major manufacturers ==
Hoosier cabinets were made mostly from the late 1890s through the 1930s, reaching their peak in popularity during the 1920s. The major manufacturers of Hoosier cabinets at that time were located in Indiana. Hoosier Manufacturing was the largest.

=== Campbell-Smith-Ritchie Company ===
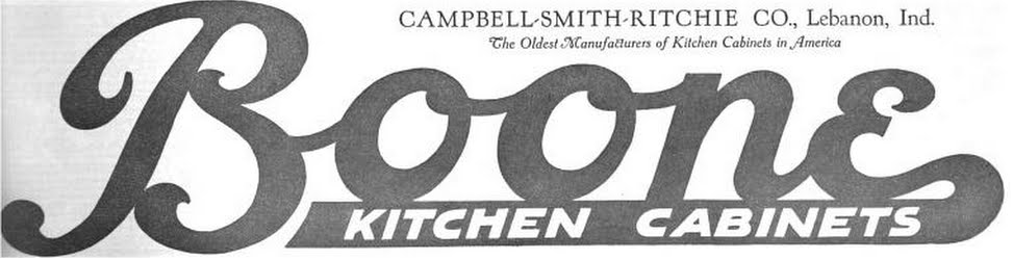
From 1922 advertisement

The company began as Campbell & Smith in 1892, and was primarily a lumber yard and planing mill. Lebanon is the county seat of Boone County, Indiana, and Campbell-Smith-Ritchie named its Hoosier-style kitchen cabinets Boone Kitchen Cabinets in honor of the county. In 1905, the lumberyard was destroyed by fire. The company built a new facility on the edge of town. By 1910, its kitchen cabinet making business was doing so well that the lumberyard portion of the business was discontinued. An Indiana inspection report for 1913 described the company as engaged in manufacturing furniture and having 90 employees. It was also the largest employer inspected in Lebanon.

The company advertised nationally, and claimed its product was designed by women from all over the nation. Models of the Boone cabinets were differentiated with names such as the Mary Boone, Bertha Boone (a larger model with storage closets at each end), and Betty Boone (a small model for apartments or smaller homes). Some included a hidden ironing board. The company, like many others, prospered until popularity declined and the Great Depression impacted manufacturing. The company responded by cutting back on employee hours and diversifying into built-in kitchen cabinets and breakfast dining sets. This strategy enabled it to survive into 1940 when it was sold. The company continued for another 18 months, but was then liquidated.

=== Coppes Brothers and Zook ===
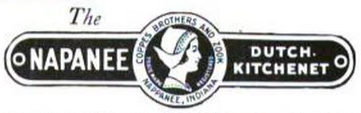
From 1918 advertisement

The Coppes Brothers and Zook decided to concentrate on kitchen cabinets in 1914. Their manufacturing facility was located in Nappanee, Indiana, and their Hoosier cabinet brand name was the Napanee Dutch Kitchenet (spelled with only one "p"). Using data from a study by efficiency engineer Harrington Emerson, the company claimed that their product could save 1,592 steps per day.

Earlier, the Coppes brothers had a sawmill business, a box manufacturing factory, and a furniture manufacturing company. An Indiana inspection report for 1913 described their company (named Coppes, Zook, and Mutschler Co. at that time) as a "saw mill, etc." and having 178 employees in a town with a population of 2,260. Right before the Great Depression started, the company began manufacturing built-in kitchen cabinets. This product was very successful, and continued for many years after the demise of the Hoosier cabinets. The Coppes Napanee company remains in business to this day and is the longest continuously operating cabinet manufacturer in the United States.

=== Hoosier Manufacturing Company ===
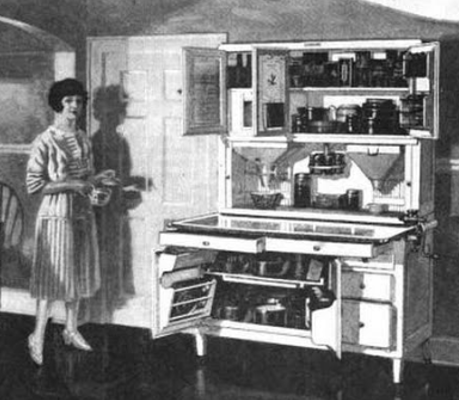
Hoosier Cabinet from 1922 advertisement

The Hoosier Manufacturing Co. began in Albany, Indiana in the year 1898. (Note: Hiller says the company began in 1898, while Kennedy says the company was incorporated in 1899.) The founders were glassmaker James McQuinn, his son Emmett McQuinn, and two business partners from Muncie, Indiana—John M. Maring and Thomas Hart. Maring and Hart served as the president and vice president, respectively. The two McQuinns ran the business, with the elder McQuinn serving as the plant's general manager and the younger as the advertising manager. Originally, the company used a former furniture manufacturing plant to make a seed separator used on farms. A secondary product, a stand-alone kitchen cabinet, sold better than the seed separator—and quickly became the company's main product. Each of the early Hoosier Cabinets was hand–made.

The company's Albany facility was destroyed by a fire in 1900. At that time, the owners decided to restart in New Castle, Indiana, which is located about 25 miles (40 km) south of Albany. A profile of the McQuinns from a 1902 publication discussed the New Castle facility, and said that the "output of the factory now amounts to nearly 200 complete kitchen cabinets per week, and sales are made of the article in every state in the Union, and many foreign countries."

In addition to its product, Hoosier Manufacturing's success can be attributed to its strengths in advertising, distribution, and manufacturing. Hoosier Manufacturing created its own dealer network, since some furniture dealers were not fond of a product that competed with their wares. If there was no dealer, products were sold directly from the factory. Advertising was conducted in newspapers and national magazines such as Ladies' Home Journal and The Saturday Evening Post, where the reader was likely to be a woman.

In 1903, the company began streamlining its manufacturing process by using interchangeable hardware, standardizing its products, and using an assembly line. The employee responsible for these innovations, Harry Hall, was also granted patents related to innovations for the cabinet and for a safety apparatus. (Note: Harry A. Hall received a patent for a sifter for flour bins in 1913. He received another patent in 1923 for a sliding moldboard. He also made safety improvements to the manufacturing process, and was granted a saw guard patent in 1928.)

By 1913, Hoosier Manufacturing had 470 employees. In 1916, the company sold its one millionth Hoosier Cabinet and was clearly the leader in free-standing kitchen cabinets. By 1920, two million had been sold. During its peak years, the company produced nearly 700 cabinets per day, and was the largest manufacturer of kitchen cabinets in the United States.

Free-standing kitchen cabinets began declining in popularity by 1930, and Hoosier Manufacturing responded by making kitchen cabinets that were meant to be built-in to the home. The company also began manufacturing kitchen tables and breakfast sets. During World War II, supplies and man-power became scarce. The company was sold and liquidated in 1942.

=== McDougall ===
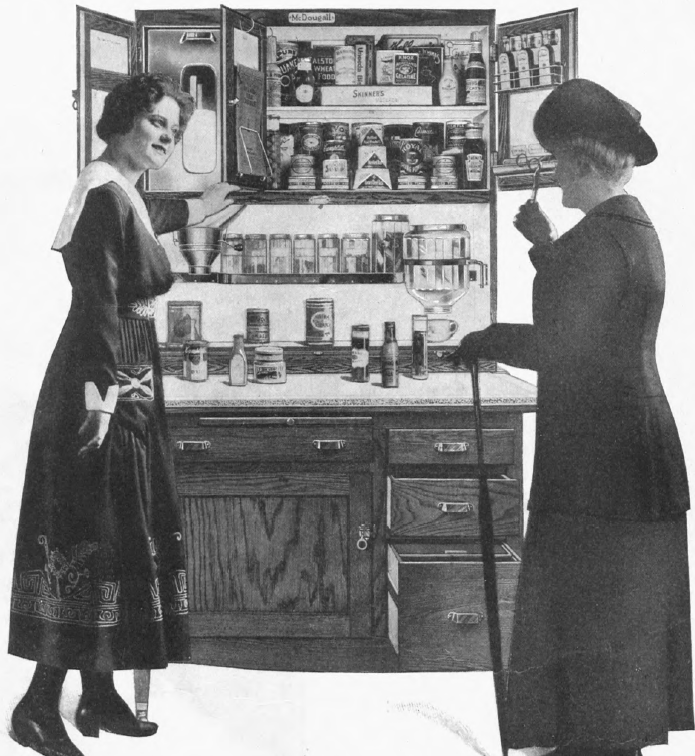
McDougall 1917

McDougall was one of the early manufacturers of a Hoosier cabinet. An advertisement from 1919 identified the McDougall as "the first kitchen cabinet". George McDougall began the McDougall Company in Indianapolis, Indiana, sometime after the Civil War. The company's products were pie safes and kitchen tables. In 1898, the company name was changed to G. P. McDougall and Son. George's son Charles traveled to learn more about the furniture business, and persuaded his father to equip their kitchen tables with flour bins—a product that eventually became known as the baker's cabinet. Charles also traveled to Europe, and the European influence can be seen in McDougall-made cabinets. In 1909, a disgruntled employee set the factory on fire, destroying the entire facility.

Charles McDougall, with several business partners, restarted the business in Frankfort, Indiana, in 1910. The company was named McDougall Company, and Hoosier cabinets were its product. The plant utilized the latest technology for furniture manufacturing. The McDougall Hoosier cabinet had a patented auto-front roll door that dropped down instead of rolling up. Its flour bin had a glass front to show the flour level in the bin. In 1913, the McDougall plant had 148 employees, making it the largest (based on employees) factory in Frankfort.

Near the end of the 1920s, the McDougall front door was changed to be similar to those used by other Hoosier cabinets. Its flour bins were made smaller. The Great Depression was difficult. The company was reorganized in 1931. The company lasted a few years before closing.

=== Sellers ===
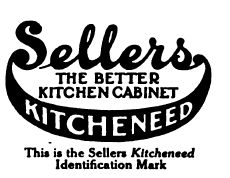
From 1916 advertisement

The G. I. Sellers Company was founded in Kokomo, Indiana, in 1888. The company made chifforobes, cabinets, and tables. Oak was their choice material. They grew to become the second-largest manufacturer of Hoosier cabinets. By 1905, their manufacturing complex covered five city blocks. During that year, their plant was destroyed by fire. In order to restart their business as soon as possible, the company purchased a furniture factory in Elwood, Indiana. At that time, the company name was changed to the G. I. Sellers and Sons Company, and manufacturing was focused on Hoosier cabinets and tables.

By 1913, the Sellers plant employed 99 people, making it the second-largest factory (based on employees) in Elwood. Among features Sellers promoted were an automatic lowering flour bin, glass drawer pulls, hand-rubbed finish on oak, and ant-proof casters. The company initiated a "Votes for Women" contest for little girls in 1914. Prizes were Junior Special Kitcheneed Cabinets, which were two-thirds the size of the Sellers Kitcheneed Special.

In 1922, company president Wilfred Sellers noted that production was 75,000 to 85,000 cabinets per year. Sellers introduced its Kitchenaire models in 1927, which had smaller flour bins but more drawers. In the early 1930s, coloring was featured, and new products were sold such as built-in kitchen cabinets and breakfast sets. During World War II, the company had difficulty acquiring raw materials and employing skilled workers. It ceased operations in 1950.

== Other manufacturers ==
Between 1899 and 1949, over 40 manufacturers of stand-alone kitchen cabinets are known to have existed, and 18 of them were located in Indiana. Many of these manufacturers had much smaller advertising budgets compared to the major manufacturers, and it can be difficult to find information about them. Factory inspectors for the state of Indiana list at least eight companies, in addition to the major manufacturers, as kitchen cabinet makers in Indiana in 1913. Those companies are Cardinal Cabinet Company (Wabash), Greencastle Cabinet Company (Greencastle), Paul Manufacturing Company (Fort Wayne), Roach-Brown Manufacturing (Indianapolis), C. F. Schmoe Furniture Company (Shelbyville), Showers Brothers (Bloomington), Spiegle Cabinet Company (Shelbyville), and Wasmuch, Endicott Company (Andrews). (Note: The companies in this list were described by the Indiana Department of Inspection as makers of kitchen cabinets. Additional kitchen cabinet making companies may be in the inspector's list, but described otherwise (such as furniture makers) instead of as kitchen cabinet manufacturers. It is possible that some of the kitchen cabinet makers in the list did not make their product in the Hoosier style.) Hoosier cabinets could also be mail-ordered from Montgomery Ward and Sears, Roebuck and Company.

- Ariel Cabinet Company of Peru, Indiana, which made the Ariel Handy Helper kitchen cabinet, was incorporated in 1920. The incorporators were from Goshen, Indiana, and already owned the Ariel Table Company of Auburn, Indiana. The Peru plant was used exclusively for kitchen cabinets, while the Auburn plant was used exclusively for kitchen tables.
- Baines-Mosier Cabinet Company of Allegan, Michigan, was established in 1906, and had 24 employees in 1915.
- Buchanan Cabinet Company of Buchanan, Michigan, manufactured kitchen cabinets and desks. It was founded in 1892, and had 31 employees in 1915.
- Cardinal Cabinet Company advertised its product as "Mother Hubbard's New Cupboards" The company began around 1910, and its officers were from Marion, Indiana. Company president in 1914 was G. A. Osborn. The Wabash, Indiana, company had 34 employees in 1913.
- Dearborn Desk Manufacturing Company of Marion, Indiana, made Marion Kitchen Cabinets. The flour bin was all-metal and removable, and it also had a sugar bin and metal bread and cake box. Indiana factory inspectors listed the company as a manufacturer of office desks with 20 employees in 1913.
- Faultless Iron Works of St. Charles, Illinois, made the White House All Metal Kitchen Cabinet. The product was made of white enameled metal, and promoted for its beauty as well as its usefulness.
- Greencastle Cabinet Company of Greencastle, Indiana, employed 82 adults in 1913. The company introduced an adjustable height cabinet in 1914. The concept was said to have originated from a suggestion by a member of the local women's club.
- Hartman Furniture and Carpet Company of Chicago sold Hartman's Famous Indiana-made kitchen cabinet that was made in a factory in central Indiana.
- Hastings Cabinet Company of Hastings, Michigan, advertised “A Shorter Days Work” for its Hastings Cabinet. The 1911 version was made of oak and had metal bins. Its fixtures were made from glass and aluminum. The company was founded in 1906, and had 33 employees in 1915.
- Kalamazoo Stove Company made the Kalamazoo Kitchen Kabinet in Kalamazoo, Michigan. The product was all-metal and white-enameled. The company was listed as a stove manufacturer in 1915 by inspectors from the Michigan Department of Labor. It had 205 employees, and was founded in 1901.
- Landau Cabinet Company of St. Louis, Missouri, was organized in 1906. Its plant occupied an entire city block. The Landau cabinet had a patented drop flour bin and called its work top "Landau's porcelain metal top".
- Marsh Furniture Company of High Point, North Carolina made Hoosier cabinets among other types of furniture, and still exists today (2018)
- Minneapolis Furniture Company of Minneapolis, Minnesota, manufactured Elwell Kitchen Cabinets and also made medicine and bath cabinets
- National Fly Screen and Manufacturing Co. of Cincinnati made the National Sanitary Kitchen Cabinet and conducted made-to-order screen work.
- Ohio State Stove and Manufacturing Company made Royal Ossco all-steel kitchen cabinets in Columbus, Ohio.
- C. F. Schmoe Furniture Company advertised its Hoosier cabinets as "Diamond Kitchen Cabinets". The company had 82 employees in 1913. The Shelbyville plant, which became the fifth largest kitchen cabinet factory, was sold in 1919 to L.A. Young Industries who planned to use it for manufacturing farm implements.
- Showers Brothers, established in 1868, had three factories in Bloomington, Indiana, and one in Iowa. They built many types of furniture, including Hoosier cabinets. In 1913, they had 499 employees.
- Spiegel Cabinet Company began in 1925 as an expansion company of the Spiegel Furniture Company, and manufactured kitchen cabinets. It closed in 1950. (Note: Possibly conflicting with the source that said Spiegel Cabinet company began in 1925, the Indiana Factory Inspection report for 1913 lists Spiegel Furniture Company with 79 employees, and a Spiegel Cabinet Company with 74 employees.)
- Vincennes Furniture Manufacturing Company used Ideal as the trade name for its products. This company was established in Vincennes, Indiana, in 1902. It built tables, kitchen cabinets, cupboards, dressers, and bookcases. It had 75 employees in 1913.
- Wasmuch-Endicott Company touted "the smooth surface round corner" kitchen cabinet in their Kitchen Maid brand Hoosier cabinets. Their motto was "Let the Kitchen Maid be Your Kitchen Aid". Features included round corners, crystal glass, automatic sugar bin, bread box, and sifter flour bin.
- Wilson kitchen cabinets were sold by Sears.

== Legacy ==
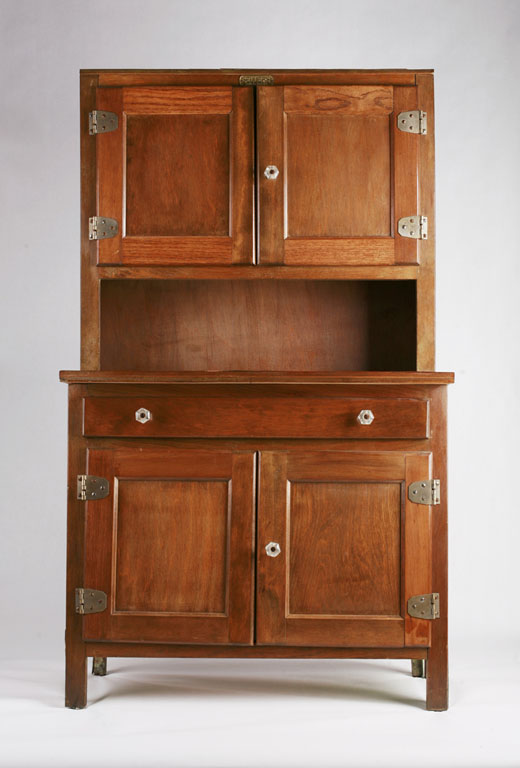
A child size Hoosier cabinet made by Sellers on display at The Children's Museum of Indianapolis

Hoosier cabinets can be found on display in museums such as the Henry Ford Museum, the Children's Museum of Indianapolis, and the Kentucky Museum. However, Hoosier cabinets are found in other places too. Numerous antique dealers and restoration companies are involved with Hoosiers because nostalgic homeowners want this piece of furniture in their home. People are also interested in reproductions of the Hoosier cabinet.

One author credits the work of Philip and Phyllis Kennedy for boosting the popularity of Hoosier cabinets. The Kennedys researched the cabinet's history and procedures for restoration during the 1980s. In a 1999 book, another author discussing the Hoosier cabinet mentioned that some cooks are "scouring antique stores, farm auctions, and flea markets for this unique, and still useful, piece of Americana."

Restored Hoosier cabinets are often sought after for use in early-twentieth-century-style kitchens, in homes from that era or in new homes built in the styles of that era." In 2004, Hoosier cabinets sold at auction were often priced at over $1,000 (equivalent to $1,705 in 2025). Oak versions with all of the accessories (flour bin, sugar bin, glass spice jars, etc.) have sold for over $2,000 (equivalent to $3,409 in 2025). Cabinets without the original accessories are typically lower priced. Some of the accessories, such as the flour sifters and the spice jars made by Sneath Glass Company also sell quickly. As always, beware of counterfeits and Hoosier Manufacturing nameplates added to old cabinets.

"Hoosier cabinets live on as more than inspiration for new varieties of kitchen furniture. A hundred years after their rise to prominence, restored originals and recent reproductions have become cherished objects in many a home." "The cabinets' sheer eccentricity, combined with their attractiveness as historic artifacts, has earned them a following equal to that of any group of collectors."

== See also ==
- Hutch (furniture)
- Kitchen cabinet
- Welsh dresser
- Secretary desk

== Notes ==
=== References ===
- Bowen, B. F. (1902). Biographical memoirs of Henry county, Indiana : to which is appended a comprehensive compendium of national biography--memoirs of eminent men and women in the United States, whose deeds of valor or works of merit have made their names imperishable ... Logansport, Indiana: B. F. Bowen Publishing. OCLC 7771132.
- Cuvier Press Club (Cincinnati, Ohio) (1914). Cincinnati, "The Queen City" Newspaper Reference Book. Cincinnati: Cuvier Press Club. OCLC 3528170.
- Fertig, Judith M. (1999). Prairie Home Cooking: 400 Recipes that Celebrate the Bountiful Harvests, Creative Cooks, and Comforting Foods of the American Heatland. Boston: Harvard Common Press. OCLC 40890949.
- Gdula, Steven (2008). The Warmest Room in the House: How the Kitchen Became the Heart of the Twentieth-Century Home. New York: Bloomsbury. ISBN 9781596917873. OCLC 681244012.
- Goodsell, Leo J.; Myers, Robert C.; Berrien County Historical Association (2005). Greetings from Buchanan, Michigan. Berrien Springs, Michigan: Berrien County Historical Association. ISBN 9780966080841. OCLC 62782865.
- Greene, George E. (1911). History of Old Vincennes and Knox County, Indiana. Chicago: S. J. Clarke. OCLC 10063365.
- Hiller, Nancy R. (2009). The Hoosier Cabinet in Kitchen History. Bloomington: Indiana University Press. ISBN 9780253314246. OCLC 258770311.
- Huston, George W. (1921). The Furniture Worker: A Journal Devoted to the General Interests of the Furniture and Kindred Industries. Cincinnati: Cohen & Co. OCLC 261227115.
- Indiana State Bureau of Inspection (1907). Annual Report of the State Bureau of Inspection Relating to Manufacturing and Mercantile Establishments, Laundries, Bakeries, Quarries, Printing Offices, Hotels, Public Buildings, Mines and Mining, Boilers, Labor Commission and License Issued. Indianapolis: William B. Burford, Contractor for State Printing and Binding. OCLC 17270523.
- Indiana State Bureau of Inspection (1914). Annual Report of the State Bureau of Inspection Relating to Manufacturing and Mercantile Establishments, Laundries, Bakeries, Quarries, Printing Offices, Hotels, Public Buildings, Mines and Mining, Boilers, Labor Commission and License Issued. Indianapolis: William B. Burford, Contractor for State Printing and Binding. OCLC 22124247.
- Kennedy, Philip D. (1989). Hoosier Cabinets. Indianapolis, IN: P.D. Kennedy. ISBN 9780962283116. OCLC 20943296.
- Madison, James H.; Sandweiss, Lee Ann; Hedeen, Jane (2014). Hoosiers and the American story. Indianapolis, IN: Indiana Historical Society Press. ISBN 9780871953636. OCLC 888025030.
- Michigan Department of Labor (1916). Annual report of the Department of Labor of the State of Michigan. Lansing, Michigan: Wynekoop Hallenbeck Crawford Co., State Printers. OCLC 12296288.
- Shelby County Historical Society (1992). Shelby County, Indiana History & Families. Paducah, KY: Turner Publishing Co. ISBN 9781563110788. OCLC 27691171.
- Sneath Glass Company; Crimmel, Henry Hays (1920). To the Housewife (sales brochure). Hartford City, Indiana: Sneath Glass Company.
- Star, Jacquelyn (1981). Free-standing Kitchen Cabinets in the United States, 1899-1930: "Hoosier" Kitchen Cabinets, Development in a Cultural Context. Madison, Wisconsin: Dissertation M.S. University of Wisconsin-Madison 1981. OCLC 7778288.
