= Sneath Glass Company =

Glass manufacturer in 20th-century Indiana

- Industry: Glass
- Predecessor: Tiffin Glass Company
- Founded: 1892
- Defunct: 1952
- Fate: Sold to Indiana Glass Company
- Headquarters: Hartford City, Indiana
- Area served: United States
- Key people: Ralph Davis Sneath, Henry Crimmel
- Products: Lantern globes kitchen container glass refrigerator products
- Revenue: USD $1.055 Million (1951)
- Number of employees: 240 (1936)

The Sneath Glass Company /sniːθ/ was an American manufacturer of glass from 1892 until 1952. Original products were mainly lantern globes and other lighting merchandise. The company transitioned to a maker of jars and glassware used in Hoosier cabinets, which were especially popular in residential kitchens during the 1920s. As demand for Hoosier cabinets faded and the use of consumer refrigerators increased, products for refrigerators became important for the company.

The company began in Tiffin, Ohio, in 1892, when businessman Samuel B. Sneath purchased the Tiffin Glass Company and renamed it. Additional owners were his son Ralph Davis Sneath and John W. Geiger. Theodore J. Creighton provided glass–making expertise and was plant manager. Production began during February 1892. The Sneath Glass works in Tiffin was destroyed by a fire in 1894. The company rebuilt its factory in Hartford City, Indiana, and resumed production later in the year. The company was reorganized with five stockholders, including the two Sneaths, Geiger, and experienced glass men Henry Crimmel and his son A. Clyde Crimmel.

In the early 1950s, glass manufacturers faced competition from the new plastics industry, and the company did not make enough product transitions. During 1952, the nation had a system of price controls that attempted to control war–time inflation, but the company's workers held a strike demanding better wages and fringe benefits. Already losing money, the company could not raise prices, and closed permanently.

== Beginning in Ohio ==
=== Predecessor ===
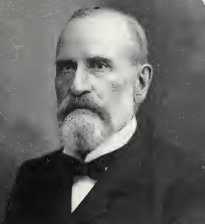
Samuel B. Sneath circa 1902

The Tiffin Glass Company was organized as a cooperative in April 1888. It was the first glass company in Tiffin, Ohio. Samuel B. Sneath, a local businessman with no glassmaking experience, was president. Construction of a glass works began during May, and the facility with a 12-pot furnace was completed by September. (Note: A pot was essentially a measure of a glass plant's capacity. Each ceramic pot was located inside the furnace. The pot contained molten glass created by melting a batch of ingredients that typically included sand, soda, and lime. Stationed around each pot was a team of laborers that extracted the molten glass and began the process of making the glass product.) Production began September 10, and the main products were tableware. Lamps and lantern globes were expected to eventually join the product portfolio. (Note: Because electric lighting did not begin until the late 1880s, many homes used kerosine lamps for lighting. Lamps consisted of a stand, fount, chimney, and often a shade. The fount (also spelled "font") held the kerosine for the lamp. The chimney was a glass tube placed around the lamp's flame that had a bulge at the base that kept drafts away from the flame and added extra illumination. A lamp's shade was a glass object that surrounded the light source and diffused it.)

After the summer stop of 1889 the company was not performing well financially, and its approximately 120 employees were unhappy with management. (Note: Most glass factories during this period had a summer stop where the production was shut down for about six weeks. This was done because the summer heat, combined with the heat of the furnace, made the work environment almost unbearable for workers near molten glass. The summer stop also allowed time to perform maintenance on the facility without disrupting the production process.) In an attempt to pause and resolve differences, the factory shut down on November 30, 1889. By January 1891, nothing had been resolved, the factory was still shut down, and creditors (employees, shareholders, tax collectors, and vendors) wanted money. An application to dissolve the company was approved in February, and the facility was leased for about four months to another glassmaker. To pay debts, the county sheriff conducted an auction of the glass works on January 7, 1892. The winning bidder was Sneath. The Tiffin Glass Company was dissolved on January 11, 1892. Years later, an unrelated Tiffin Glass Company would come into existence.

=== Sneath Glass in Tiffin ===
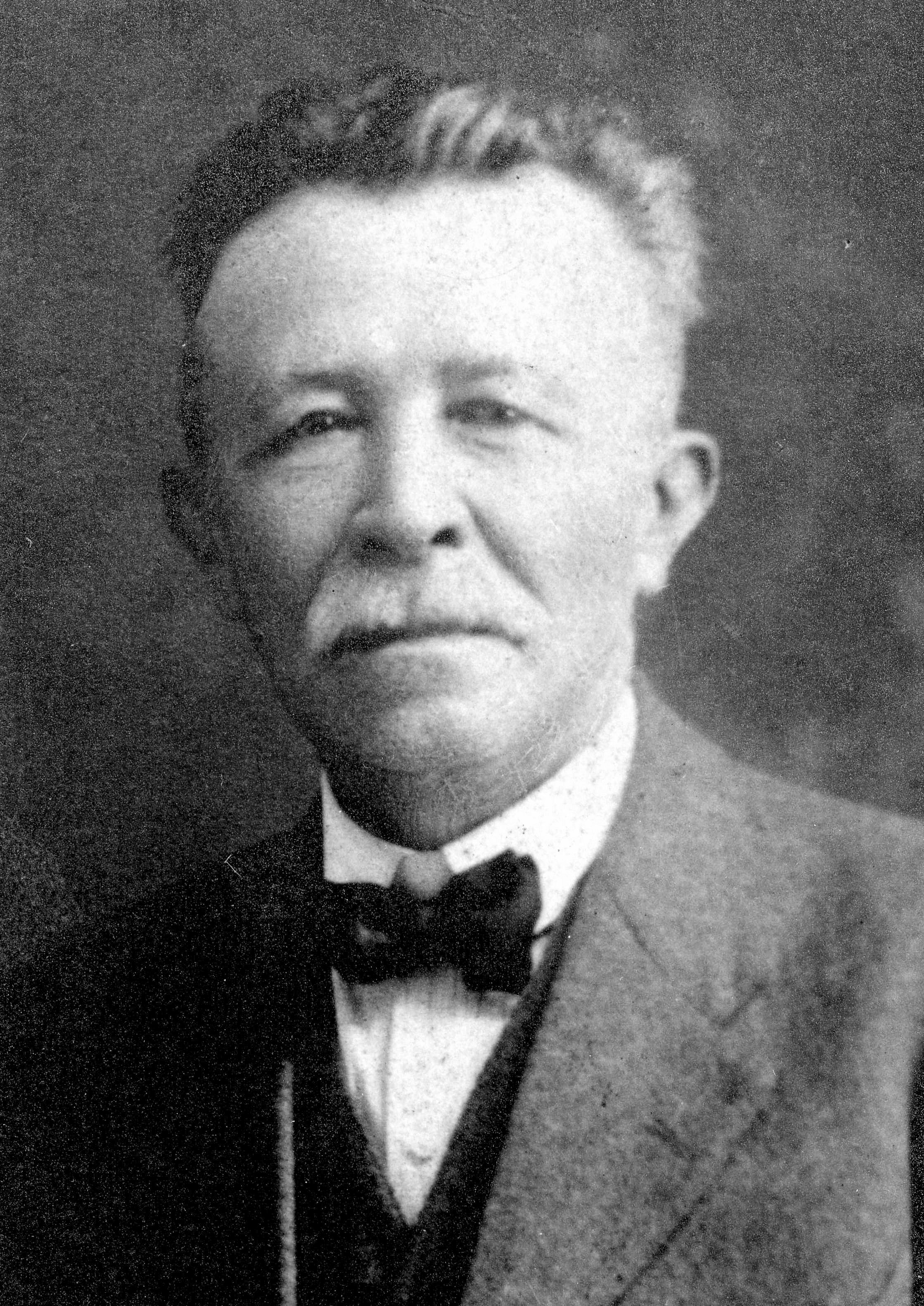
Henry Crimmel

After Sneath's purchase of the Tiffin Glass factory, it was revealed that, prior to the purchase, a new firm called Sneath Glass Company had been formed—and Sneath's purchase had been as a representative of that company. The new firm was organized by Sneath, his son Ralph Davis Sneath, and John W. Geiger. The elder Sneath was the new company's president and treasurer, Geiger was secretary, and Theodore J. Creighton was plant manager. Production began on February 20, 1892. Products were jars and lantern globes.

In nearby Fostoria, Ohio, the Novelty Glass Company shut down in January 1892 because of a lack of orders. Although it planned to restart in April, it remained closed in May. At that time, plant manager Henry Crimmel left the company to become manager of Sneath Glass—replacing Creighton. Crimmel was an experienced glass worker. In addition to Novelty Glass Company, he had also been a manager at Belmont Glass Works and Fostoria Glass Company, and worked at J. H. Hobbs, Brockunier and Company. Under the leadership of its new manager, Sneath Glass prospered.

=== Factory burns ===
During mid-March 1894, the Sneath Glass plant in Tiffin was destroyed by fire. The company's warehouses were saved. The destruction of the main works was so complete that it was said that the only things remaining were the building's side walls and smokestack. The facility would never be rebuilt. An offer was made by the Hartford City Land Company to the Sneaths and Geiger, which would enable them to restart their glass making in Hartford City, Indiana. Already with insurance money, management was enticed by natural gas, free land, a relocation bonus, and railroad facilities. (Note: The Hartford City Land Company was formed in 1891 as part of an effort to take advantage of the discovery of natural gas in the area by attracting manufacturers to the town.)

== Beginning in Indiana ==
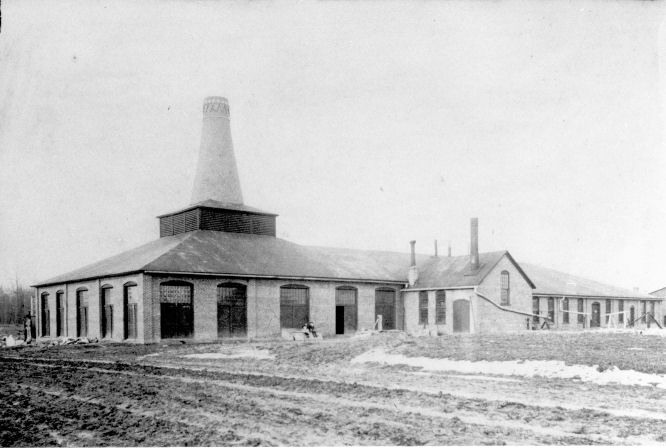
The new Sneath glass factory in 1895

Brochure

In June 1894, plans for the new factory in Hartford City were underway. The new plant was located on the north side of town, and had access to natural gas and a belt railway. By September, portions of the plant were operating, producing lantern globes. During December 1894, the company filed articles with the Indiana Secretary of State for incorporation with capital stock of $30,000 (equivalent to $1,116,000 in 2025). The firm's officers were Ralph Davis Sneath, president; Geiger, treasurer; A. Clyde Crimmel, secretary; and Henry Crimmel, plant manager. In addition to the three owners of the Ohio version of the company (Geiger and the two Sneaths), the Indiana version of the company included the two Crimmels. Each of the five men owned one fifth of the company's stock. A. Clyde Crimmel was Henry's son. The Crimmels had glass making experience, as A. Clyde Crimmel had been secretary of Novelty Glass Company and Henry Crimmel had managed several works. The other three men were successful businessmen. Both Ralph and Samuel Sneath kept their homes in Tiffin, while Geiger and the Crimmels moved to Hartford City.

The company made all types of lantern globes, especially those used by railroads and ships. It also made semaphore glass for signaling. At one time during the 1890s, it was one of only three factories in the United States that made copper ruby globes. Over a decade later, globes made by Sneath were used in the construction of the Panama Canal. By 1897, Sneath Glass had over 60 employees. In 1899, the company was still manufacturing semaphore globes and lantern globes. The company was also making additional products such as fancy colored glassware, fruit jars, globes and shades, and glass smoke bells.

=== Factory relocation ===
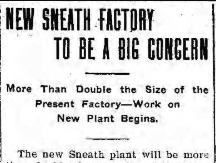
Beginning of a newspaper article about the new factory

By early January 1903, the company was discussing a gas shortage. Plans were made to use coal as a fuel for the furnaces when the natural gas supply was exhausted, contingent upon satisfactory railroad service. At the time, the company did not have direct access to railroad service, and all freight (inbound and outbound) had to be hauled to the rail station by wagon.

Focusing on improving efficiency at the current glass works, plant manager Henry Crimmel received a patent in 1904 for a “Glass Drawing Machine” that was an improvement for glass blowing and prevented irregularities in the thickness of the glass. By the end of 1904, the company had to use coal for fuel, making the lack of direct rail service more important. Coal would be too expensive with a branch line from the railroads that could be used for delivery. The company was receiving offers from states such as New York and Colorado to move their plant to a better location.

In May 1905, it was announced that the Sneath Glass works would move to an unused window glass plant, located along railroad line on the city's west side, that it had purchased. The plant had been owned by the American Window Glass Company, was known as Plant number 32, and had been the plant of the Jones Glass Company. American Window Glass had closed the plant in 1904, and was willing to sell the plant to Sneath. The new plant would more than double Sneath's capacity, and the adjacent railroad began construction of coal docks. (Note: The Jones Glass Company operated a window glass plant beginning December 1898. The factory operated for about one year until it was sold to the American Window Glass trust and became known as the trust's Factory Number 32. The factory was unable to secure natural gas for its furnace during February 1904, and it was closed permanently.)

The company began using its new facility during November 1905. It increased its capital stock from $30,000 to $100,000 in early 1906 (equivalent to $3,583,000 in 2025). Ralph Davis Sneath was still president and A. Clyde Crimmel was still secretary. For the next few years, the company continued to make improvements to its facility, including concrete walls and electric lighting. By January 1907, it employed 175 people.

=== Loss of the founders ===
Samuel B. Sneath died on January 7, 1915, at the age of 86 years. Geiger retired in 1907 and moved back to Ohio. He continued to be a company stockholder. He died at his home in Tiffin on June 23, 1915, at the age of 74 years. Henry Crimmel suffered a stroke in 1916, forcing him into full retirement. He died about one year later at the age of 73 years.

After the deaths of three of the five founders of the Indiana version of the company, their stock went to their heirs, which kept the company closely owned. In 1917, the company had about 15 stockholders. A. Clyde Crimmel owned the most stock, and he was vice-president and treasurer. His son, Henry Hays Crimmel, would later join the company and eventually rise to vice president and co-manager of the factory.

== Transition from globes to other products ==
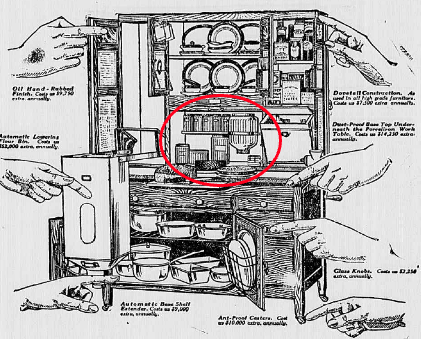
A Hoosier cabinet made by Sellers & Sons with glassware circled

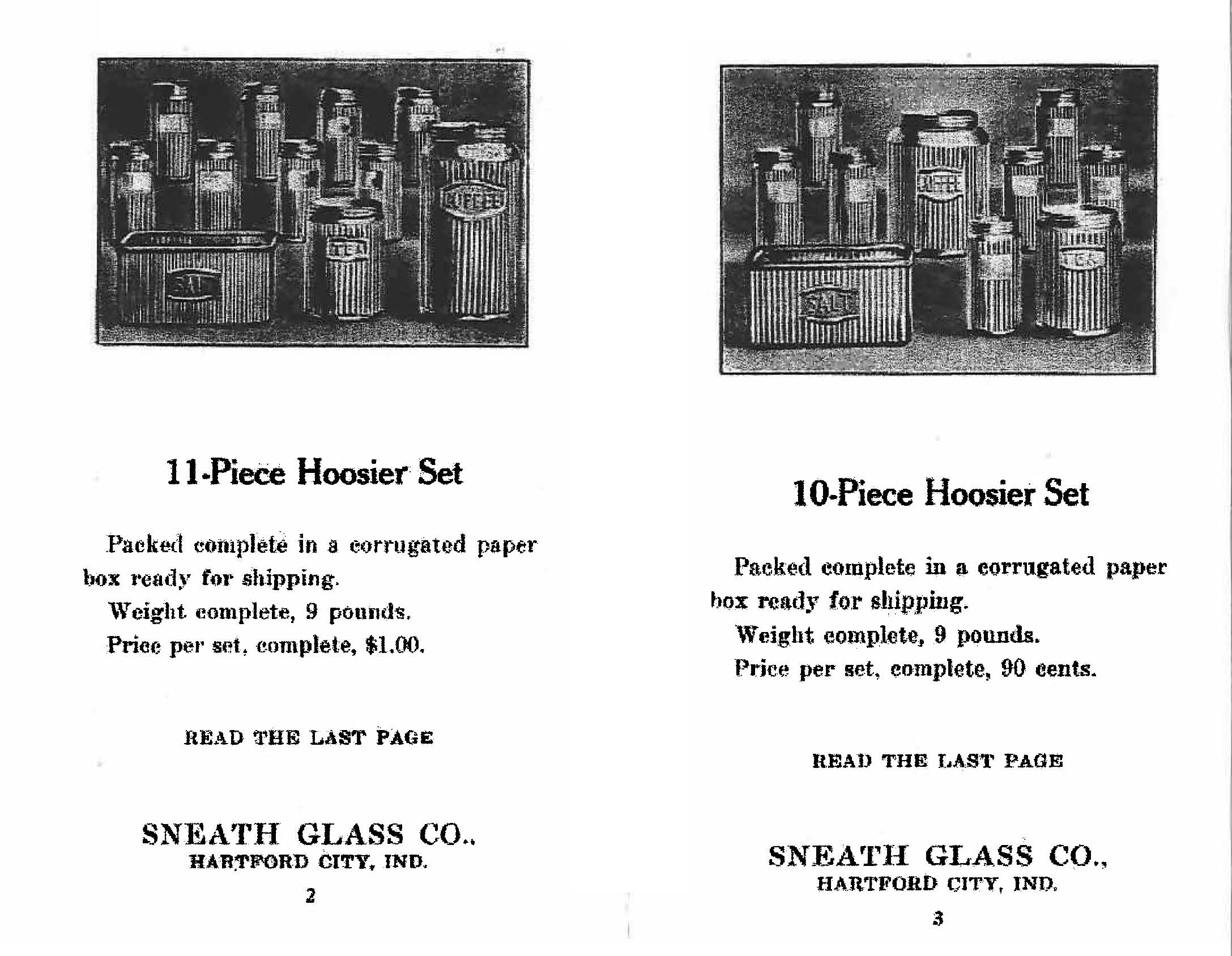
Catalog page for Sneath Glass Company showing canisters for Hoosier cabinets

Originally, the company devoted its production exclusively to lighting and lantern-related products such as lantern globes and founts. It made more globes than any two companies combined. Sneath began diversifying as early as 1908, when they announced they would be making fruit jars because of an unusually large crop that season.

Around 1914, Sneath started making glassware for portable kitchen cabinets known as Hoosier cabinets. (Note: Very few homes had built-in kitchen countertops and kitchen cabinets during the 19th century, and it was not until the late 1920s that built-in cabinets became a standard kitchen furnishing. The Hoosier Manufacturing Company began making a piece of furniture that was a workstation and kitchen cabinet. The company's product was so popular that "Hoosier cabinet" became a generic term for that style of kitchen cabinet. Hoosier cabinets, made by Hoosier Manufacturing or its competitors, were very popular from 1900 to 1930. Eventually houses were built with modern kitchens that included built-in cabinets, counter tops, and other fixtures—making the Hoosier cabinet obsolete.) This began the gradual transition from manufacturer of lantern globes to manufacturer of glass products for portable kitchen cabinets. Cabinet products included salt and sugar bins, spice jars, and coffee and tea jars. Another product was a dispensing jar, with a design patented November 2, 1915.

=== World War I and after ===
The company used its experience with lighting and lenses to assist the United States government during World War I. Almost 10 percent of Sneath's production was devoted to a contract with the United States Navy to manufacture signal and masthead lights. Red, green, and white lights were produced for Navy ships. Fresnel deck lights were also produced. By 1918, the company's main products (in addition to the lenses and lamps) were lantern globes, colored and crystal specialties, and food preservation ware such as canisters and fruit jars.

In August 1920, the company changed operations to two ten-hour shifts each day instead of three eight-hour shifts. This was the procedure preferred by the workforce. The plant used coal to produce producer gas for its furnaces because of shortages of natural gas. Management in the early 1920s consisted of Ralph Davis Sneath, president; A. Clyde Crimmel, vice president and treasurer; Ray Pruden, superintendent; and Harry C. Hill, secretary.

Sneath Glass continued making glassware for kitchen cabinet manufacturers such as Hoosier and Sellers, and the 1920s were peak years for that cabinet style. The company was the state's leading manufacturer of glassware for kitchen cabinets. Sneath management also patented more products used in kitchen cabinets, such as a sugar bin and a holder for condiment jars.

Around 1921, the company began manufacturing a wall-mounted mailbox. These mailboxes were made of glass, enabling one to easily see if mail had been delivered. Sneath employee William Chapman, working under the supervision of Ray Pruden, was granted a patent for the glass mailbox in 1921. (Note: Although the local newspaper listed both Ray Pruden and William Chapman as the patentees of the glass mailbox, both glass mailbox-related patents from that period list only William Moses Chapman as the inventor.) Chapman, a well-known glass blower, was also granted a patent for the design of an ash tray. Management patented other products during the 1920s, including a caster for furniture, a drawer pull, a measuring cup, and a chick fount.

== The Great Depression and World War II ==
In 1930, management consisted of Ralph Davis Sneath, president; A. Clyde Crimmel, vice president; Henry Hays Crimmel, treasurer and general manager; Harry C. Hill, secretary and sales manager; and Ray Pruden, factory manager. During the Great Depression of the 1930s, Sneath kept a workforce of over 200. In late summer 1936, the company announced it would add extra pay to the paychecks of 240 employees in appreciation for their production during the extremely hot summer. The company had 231 employees in 1940.

=== Refrigerator products ===
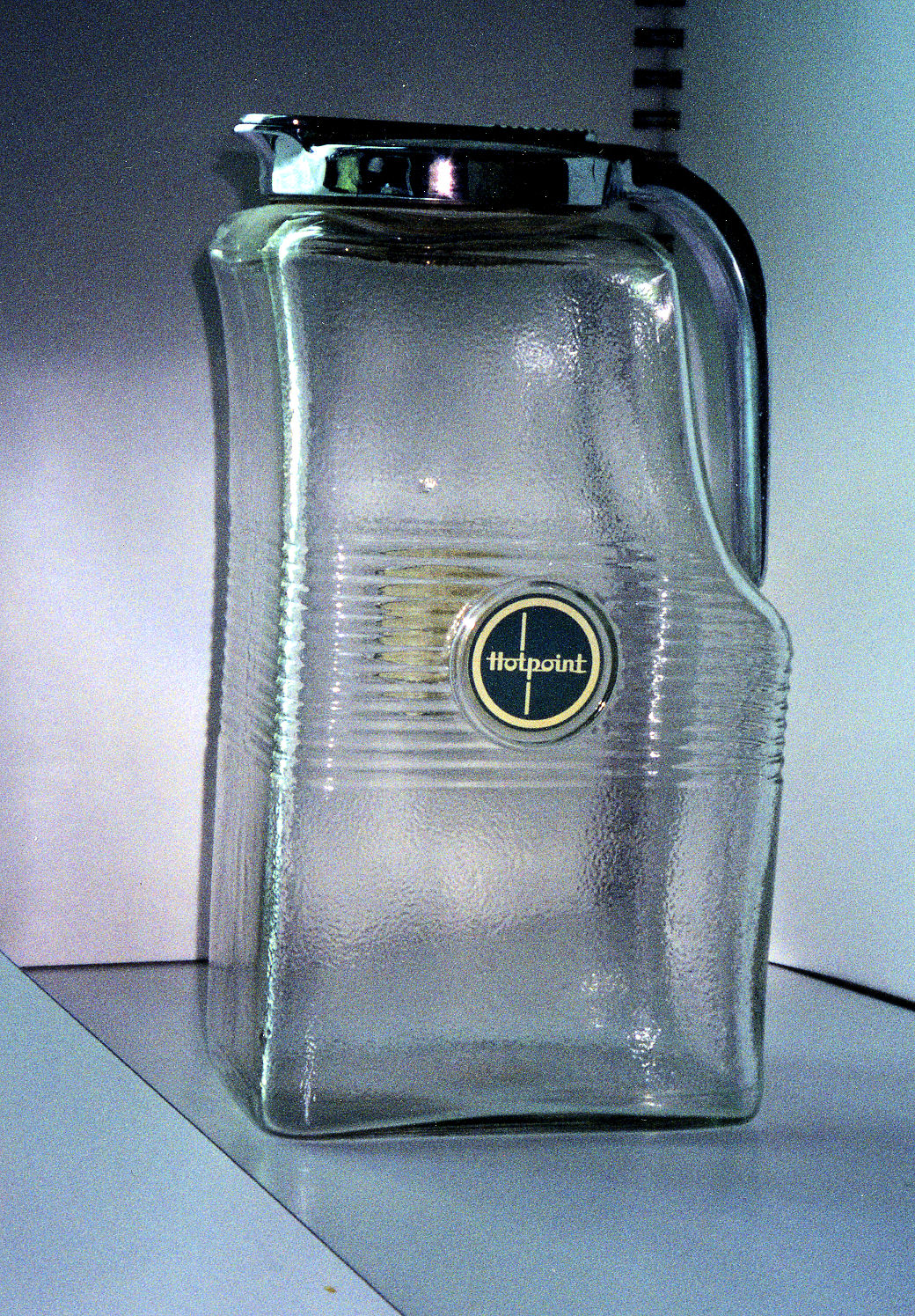
Pitcher made by Sneath

Sneath began making refrigerator products as early as the 1920s, and it helped expand the business. By the mid-1930s, Hoosier style cabinets had lost their popularity. New houses typically contained built-in cabinetry. Glassware for refrigerators became important for the company, including products such as defroster trays, cold water pitchers, and butter dishes. (Note: Household ownership of electric refrigerators in the United States increased from about 10 percent in 1930 to 85 percent in 1944.) It has been claimed that Sneath Glass, at one time, produced almost 90 percent of the glassware used in consumer refrigerators in the United States. During a period from 1933 to 1941, multiple patents related to mechanical refrigerators were granted to company employees for defrosting trays and other components for the interior of refrigerators. Although refrigerator products became the growth area for the company, it still made other merchandise including sundae dishes, ink wells, and fish tanks.

=== Ralph Sneath and World War II ===
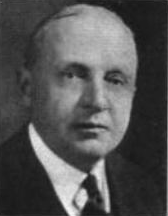
Ralph Davis Sneath circa 1928

On June 9, 1940, millionaire Ralph Davis Sneath died at the age of 76 from injuries received in a May 29 auto accident. Sneath bequeathed $160,000 to institutions and individuals. The company was reorganized in 1941 with A. Clyde Crimmel as president and Hill as secretary. Product sales for 1941 were $1.69 million (equivalent to $36,989,000 in 2025). The mid-1940s management team was A. Clyde Crimmel, president; Henry Hays Crimmel, Vice President; Harry C. Hill, Secretary and Sales Manager; S. B. Sneath Jr., Treasurer; John Richard Crimmel, Assistant Treasurer and Purchasing Agent; and Ray Pruden, Superintendent.

In the 1940s, refrigeration products continued to be an important segment of the product portfolio. During World War II, the company made water-tight globes and lenses for search lights. Since metals were scarce for the domestic market, the company also made glass irons, skillets, and kitchen sinks. Another product that began in the 1940s was the company's own version of heat proof glass (borosilicate glass). This glass could be moved between a refrigerator and oven without breaking from the extreme temperature change. Heat proof glass was used for ovenware and coffee makers, and, during World War II, it was used in searchlight products. After the war, sales of all products declined in 1948 and 1949, but were back up to $1.03 million in 1950 and $1.055 million in 1951 (equivalent to $13,091,900 in 2025).

== The end of Sneath Glass ==
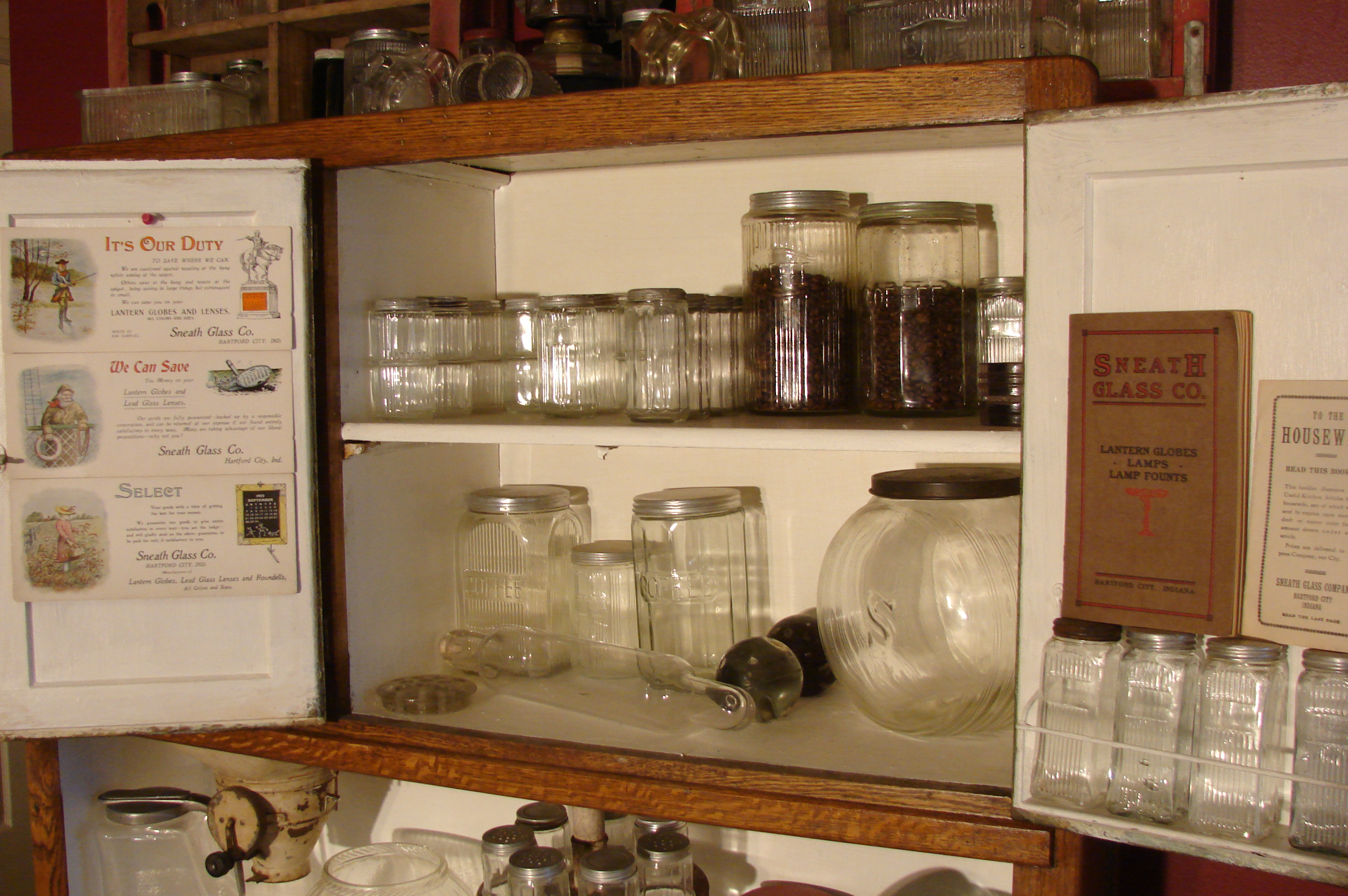
A collector's Sneath products in a Hoosier cabinet

In the early 1950s, glass manufacturers faced competition from the new plastics industry, as refrigerator parts and glassware had begun being made using plastic instead of glass. Glass companies needed to change with the times or face extinction, and Sneath Glass did not make enough changes. Sneath Glass Company was losing money during 1952, but the local labor union went on strike for higher wages and fringe benefits. At the time, the nation's Office of Price Stabilization would not allow Sneath to increase prices. (Note: In the United States, prices were frozen on January 26, 1951, as part of an effort to stabilize inflation during the Korean War.) The plant was closed during September 1952, and approximately 125 families lost a source of income. The remaining company founder, A. Clyde Crimmel, died within two years.

During March 1953 it was announced that Indiana Glass Company purchased the Sneath Glass Company. The purchaser planned to reopen the glass works, and both companies were making glassware for the table and oven. This acquisition enabled the company to offer Sneath's heat proof glass as one of its many glassware products. Production at the Hartford City plant was restarted briefly, but eventually halted. Eventually the plant was sold to Sinclair Glass Company.

== Notes ==
=== References ===
- American Flint Glass Workers’ Union (1944). "Sneath Glass Company". Proceedings of the ...Annual Convention of the American Flint Glass Workers' Union. 68–69. Cincinnati, Ohio: American Flint Glass Workers’ Union: 109. OCLC 49730495.
- American Flint Glass Workers’ Union (1946). "Sneath Glass Company". Proceedings of the ...Annual Convention of the American Flint Glass Workers' Union. 70–71. Cincinnati, Ohio: American Flint Glass Workers’ Union: 109. OCLC 49730495.
- Banking Publicity Assn. of the United States (July 1940). "Unlisted". Trusts and Estates. 71 (1). New York City: Fiduciary Publishers: 24. OCLC 473116336.
- Bennett, Ira E. (1915). History of the Panama Canal; Its Construction and Builders. Washington, DC: Historical Pub. Co. OCLC 859690.
- Castelo, Sinuard; Clamme, Louise; Dodds, Dealie; Clamme, David; Marshall, Mary Lou; Storms, Ron; Rogers, Don (2012). Dusty Bits and Pieces of Blackford County History. Hartford City, Indiana: Blackford County Historical Society. OCLC 988772407.
- Castelo, Sinuard; Clamme, Louise; Marshall, Mary Lou; Storms, Ron (2013). The Glassmen. Hartford City, Indiana: Blackford County Historical Society. OCLC 870655557.
- Cook, Harry H. (March 1928). "A Sturdy Old Oak". American Flint. XIX (5). Toledo, Ohio: American Flint Glass Workers' Union: 12–14. OCLC 3956009.
- Dale, George R. (1899). Directory of Hartford City, Ind., Together with a Complete Gazetteer of Blackford County Land Owners. Hartford City, Indiana: G.R. Dale.
- Davis, Dyer; Gross, Daniel (2001). The Generations of Corning: The Life and Times of a Global Corporation. Oxford: Oxford University Press. ISBN 978-0-195140-95-8. OCLC 45437326.
- Duncan, George Sang; Turner, W.E.S. (1945). "Sneath Glass Co., Hartford City;". Directory for the British Glass Industry. London: Society of Glass Technology: 62.
- Glass, James A.; Kohrman, David (2005). The Gas Boom of East Central Indiana. Charleston, South Carolina: Arcadia. ISBN 978-0-73853-963-8. OCLC 61885891.
- Hiller, Nancy R. (2009). The Hoosier Cabinet in Kitchen History. Bloomington: Indiana University Press. ISBN 9780253314246. OCLC 258770311.
- McAbee, D.H., ed. (1898). "Inspections". Annual Report of the Department of Factory Inspection of the State of Indiana. 1 (1897). Indianapolis, Indiana: State of Indiana, Office of Factory Inspector: 19–41. OCLC 13451525.
- National Glass Budget (1951). "Sneath Glass Co. (borosilicate ovenware, etc.)". Directory for the British Glass Industry (National Glass Budget). Pittsburgh, Pennsylvania: A. W. Kimes: 22.
- Paquette, Jack K. (2002). Blowpipes, Northwest Ohio Glassmaking in the Gas Boom of the 1880s. Xlibris Corp. ISBN 1-4010-4790-4. OCLC 50932436.
- Pulos, Arthur J. (1988). The American Design Adventure, 1940-1975. Cambridge, Mass: MIT Press. ISBN 978-0-262161-06-0. OCLC 16755169.
- Shotwell, David J. (2002). Glass A to Z. Iola, Wisconsin: Krause Publications. ISBN 978-0-87349-385-7. OCLC 440702171.
- United States Board of Tax Appeals (1926). "Appeal of the Sneath Glass Company - Docket No. 346". Reports of the United States Board of Tax Appeals - July 16, 1924, to May 31, 1925. 1. Washington, District of Columbia: United States Government Printing Office: 736–741. OCLC 4996178.
- United States Department of Commerce, Bureau of Foreign and Domestic Commerce (1917). The Glass Industry. Report on the Cost of Production of Glass in the United States. Washington: Government Printing Office. OCLC 5705310.
- Unlisted (American Glass Review) (1930). "Glass factory year book and directory". American Glass Review. 50. Pittsburgh, Pennsylvania: Commoner Pub. Co. OCLC 8218018.
- Unlisted (American Glass Review) (October 2, 1943). "Untitled (right side of page)". American Glass Review. 63 (1). Pittsburgh, Pennsylvania: Commoner Pub. Co.: 10. OCLC 8218018.
- Unlisted (Hartford City Illustrated) (1896). Hartford City illustrated : a publication devoted to the city's best interests and containing half tone engravings of prominent factories, business blocks, residences, and a selection of representative commercial and professional men and women. Daulton & Scott. OCLC 11382905.
- Unlisted (National Cyclopaedia) (1920). "Sneath, Samuel Baugher". The National Cyclopaedia of American Biography. XVII. New York: James. T. White & Company. OCLC 1759175.
- Unlisted (National Glass Budget July) (July 3, 1915). "John W. Geiger Dead". Nation Glass Budget Weekly Review of the American Glass Industry. 31 (8). Pittsburgh: George B. Kimes: 14. OCLC 473116336.
- Unlisted (National Glass Budget June) (June 30, 1917). "Untitled (bottom of column 3)". Nation Glass Budget Weekly Review of the American Glass Industry. 33 (8). Pittsburgh: George B. Kimes: 1. OCLC 473116336.
- Unlisted (National Glass Budget May) (May 26, 1917). "Filling Government Contracts". Nation Glass Budget Weekly Review of the American Glass Industry. 33 (3). Pittsburgh: George B. Kimes: 3. OCLC 473116336.
- Unlisted (National Glass Budget October) (October 13, 1917). "Henry Crimmel Dead". Nation Glass Budget Weekly Review of the American Glass Industry. 33 (23). Pittsburgh: George B. Kimes: 15. OCLC 473116336.
- Unlisted (National Glass Budget January) (January 12, 1918). "(Untitled, bottom of column 2)". Nation Glass Budget Weekly Review of the American Glass Industry. 33 (36). Pittsburgh: George B. Kimes: 1. OCLC 473116336.
- Unlisted (National Glass Budget February) (February 21, 1920). "Offers to Equip Hospital Room". Nation Glass Budget Weekly Review of the American Glass Industry. 35 (42). Pittsburgh: George B. Kimes: 10. OCLC 473116336.
- Unlisted (National Glass Budget) (1952). "Glass factories". National Glass Budget – Glass Factory Directory. Pittsburgh: National Glass Budget: 24. OCLC 4388801.
- Unlisted (Popular Mechanics Magazine) (December 1943). "Glass Box Shows at a Glance What Postman Has Left". Popular Mechanics Magazine. 80 (6). New York City: Hearst Magazines: 46.
- Unlisted (Seeger and Guernsey) (1899). Seeger and Guernsey's Cyclopædia of the Manufactures and Products of the United States. New York City: United States Industrial Publishing Company. OCLC 2828599.
- Venable, Charles L.; Jenkins, Tom; Denker, Ellen P.; Grier, Katherine C. (2000). China and Glass in America, 1880-1980: from Tabletop to TV Tray. Dallas: Dallas Museum of Art. ISBN 978-0-81096-692-5. OCLC 905439701.
- Unlisted (Seneca Biographical) (1902). A Centennial Biographical History of Seneca County, Ohio. Chicago: Lewis Publishing Company.
