= Otsego High School (Michigan) =

Location
- 550 Washington Street; Otsego, Michigan 49078; United States
- Coordinates: 42°27′19″N 85°42′44″W

Information
- Type: Public high school
- School district: Otsego School District
- NCES School ID: 262706006319
- Principal: Thomas Reed
- Teaching staff: 27.88 (on an FTE basis)
- Grades: 9–12
- Enrollment: 741 (2023-2024)
- Student to teacher ratio: 26.58
- Colors: Navy blue and Vegas gold
- Athletics conference: Wolverine Conference
- Nickname: Bulldogs
- Rival: Plainwell High School
- Website: ohs.otsegops.org

Otsego High School is the only high school located in Otsego, Michigan and part of the Otsego Public Schools district.

== Achievements ==
in 1925, the Otsego High School track team won the class C State Championship under coach and principal Fordyce Bragg. In 2024, the Otsego High School Bulldog Marching Band won Grand Champion at the Grandville Invitational with a score of 89.1.

== Notable alumni ==
- Hal W. Vincent, naval aviator and major general of the United States Marines
- Kevin VanDam, professional bass fisherman
