= Wilson C. Edsell =

American politician

Wilson Canfield Edsell (July 8, 1814 – August 12, 1900) served in the Michigan Senate, representing Allegan County, in 1865–1866, 1877–1878, and 1881–1882.

Edsell was the son of Jesse Edsell and Polly Canfield. He was born in Pike, Pennsylvania, on July 8, 1814, and raised on a farm attending common (public) schools. In 1835, he enrolled at Oberlin College and helped found Olivet College in 1843. He served the college as a trustee, secretary, and treasurer for six years before settling in Otsego, Michigan, in 1849. He made his living there as a lawyer, justice, and Michigan Asylum trustee. His party affiliation was Republican initially, but later converted to the Prohibitionist party.

Edsell was the founder of the first National Bank in Otsego, as well as the sole contributor to the construction and provision of the town's Opera House. He died August 12, 1900, at Otsego, Michigan.
