= Otsego Public Schools =

School district in Michigan

Address
- 400 Sherwood Street Otsego, Allegan, Michigan, 49078; United States

District information
- Grades: Pre-Kindergarten-12
- Established: 1957
- Superintendent: Dr. Christie Robinson
- Schools: 6
- Budget: $44,589,000 2022-2023 expenditures
- NCES District ID: 2627060

Students and staff
- Students: 2,368 (2024-2025)
- Teachers: 144.14 FTE (2024-2025)
- Staff: 309.16 FTE (2024-2025)
- Student–teacher ratio: 16.43 (2024-2025)

Other information
- Website: www.otsegops.org

Otsego Public Schools is a public school district in Allegan County and Kalamazoo County, Michigan. It serves Otsego and parts of Otsego Township, Trowbridge Township, and Watson Township in Allegan County. In Kalamazoo County, it serves parts of Alamo Township, Cooper Township, and Oshtemo Township.

== History ==
A one-room schoolhouse existed in Otsego as early as 1839.

Otsego Public Schools was established in 1957, when several small districts in the Otsego area consolidated with districts in Alamo Township.

The site at the corner of Allegan Street and North Street has long been used by the school district. First, it was the site of Oak Grove Seminary, a private school built in 1855 and later acquired by the school district. It, and many of the schools there, have been affected by fires:

- The Oak Grove Seminary burned down in 1863. It was rebuilt, and a brick school was later built on the site in 1868. In 1897 the seminary was torn down and a high school was built on the site.
- In 1902, the high school burned down and was rebuilt. A three-story building called Oakwood School was added to the site in 1910, replacing the 1868 building, and it was connected to the 1902 building in 1925 with a bridge.
- In 1932, the complex was destroyed by fire. Parts of it, including the Oakwood School, were salvaged and rebuilt.
- On February 15, 1952, the wing of the building known as Oakwood School burned down. The Oakwood School was used as an elementary school, and it was connected to the newer high school section with fire-resistant doors that protected the high school. A new high school, designed by G.E. Diekma of Kalamazoo, opened in fall 1961 on its current campus The Allegan Street building became a junior high.
- In 1966, one of that building's wings burned down. This led to the construction of a new junior high on its current campus. The former junior high was repaired and reopened as Allegan Street Elementary. It closed in summer 2007.

Otsego High School opened in fall 2007. It was designed by architecture firm TowerPinkster. It replaced a building, now Otsego Middle School, built in 1961. The former middle school, built in 1969, became Washington Street Elementary.

== Schools ==
Schools in Otsego Public Schools district
School	Address	Notes
Learn 'n Grow Early Childhood Education Center	485 18th Street, Otsego	Preschool with an outdoors/nature-based curriculum Opened fall 2019.
Alamo Elementary	8184 N. 6th St., Kalamazoo	Grades K-5
Dix Street Elementary	503 Dix St., Otsego	Grades K-5
Washington Street Elementary	538 Washington St., Otsego	Grades K-5. Built 1969.
Otsego Middle School	540 Washington St., Otsego	Grades 6-8. Built 1961.
Otsego High School	550 Washington St., Otsego	Grades 9-12. Opened fall 2007.
