= Brookhaven, Pennsylvania =

Borough in Pennsylvania, US

- Borough
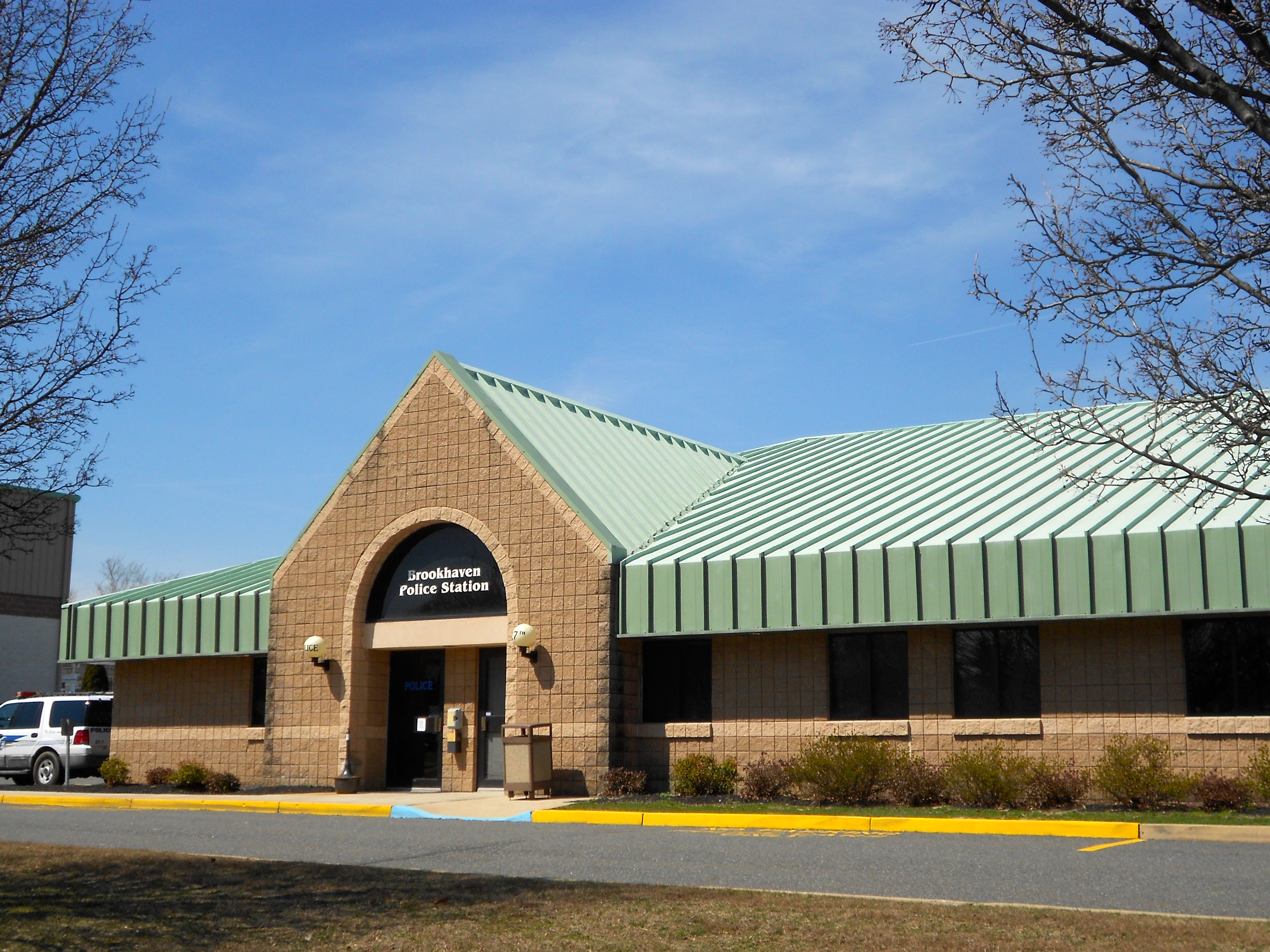
- Town hall

- Flag Seal
- Motto: We are Brookhaven strong.
- Location in Delaware County and the U.S. state of Pennsylvania

- Location in Pennsylvania Location in the United States
- Coordinates: 39°52′14″N 75°23′27″W
- Country: United States
- State: Pennsylvania
- County: Delaware
- Formed: 1945

Government
  - Mayor: Denise Leslie

Area
  - Total: 1.71 sq mi (4.43 km^{2})
  - Land: 1.71 sq mi (4.42 km^{2})
  - Water: 0 sq mi (0.00 km^{2})
- Elevation: 98 ft (30 m)

Population (2020)
  - Total: 8,300
  - Estimate (2023): 8,291
  - Density: 4,858.1/sq mi (1,875.73/km^{2})
- Time zone: UTC-5 (EST)
  - Summer (DST): UTC-4 (EDT)
- ZIP code: 19015
- Area codes: 610 and 484
- FIPS code: 42-09080
- Website: www.brookhavenboro.com

Brookhaven is a borough in Delaware County, Pennsylvania, United States. The population was 8,300 at the 2020 census.

== Geography ==
Brookhaven is located at 39°52′14″N 75°23′27″W (39.870662, -75.390915) with an average elevation of 98 feet (30 m) above sea level.

According to the United States Census Bureau, the borough has a total area of 1.7 square miles (4.4 km^{2}), of which 1.7 square miles (4.4 km^{2}) is land and 0.59% is water.

== Demographics ==
Historical population
Census	Pop.	Note	%±
1950	1,042		—
1960	5,280		406.7%
1970	7,370		39.6%
1980	7,912		7.4%
1990	8,567		8.3%
2000	7,985		−6.8%
2010	8,006		0.3%
2020	8,300		3.7%

As of Census 2010, the racial makeup of the borough was 92.4% White, 3.7% African American, 0.1% Native American, 1.9% Asian, 0.3% from other races, and 1.6% from two or more races. Hispanic or Latino of any race were 2.0% of the population .

As of the census of 2000, there were 7,985 people, 3,476 households, and 2,200 families residing in the borough. The population density was 4,705.3 inhabitants per square mile (1,816.7/km^{2}). There were 3,595 housing units at an average density of 2,118.4 per square mile (817.9/km^{2}). The racial makeup of the borough was 95.64% White, 2.02% African American, 0.08% Native American, 1.24% Asian, 0.44% from other races, and 0.59% from two or more races. Hispanic or Latino of any race were 1.13% of the population.

There were 3,486 households, out of which 24.7% had children under the age of 18 living with them, 49.3% were married couples living together, 10.5% had a female householder with no husband present, and 36.7% were non-families. 31.5% of all households were made up of individuals, and 11.5% had someone living alone who was 65 years of age or older. The average household size was 2.29 and the average family size was 2.90.

In the borough the population was spread out, with 19.8% under the age of 18, 6.6% from 18 to 24, 31.8% from 25 to 44, 23.4% from 45 to 64, and 18.4% who were 65 years of age or older. The median age was 40 years. For every 100 females there were 87.5 males. For every 100 females age 18 and over, there were 84.3 males.

The median income for a household in the borough was $67,348, and the median income for a family was $58,271. Males had a median income of $40,158 versus $32,155 for females. The per capita income for the borough was $23,706 (compared with $21,587 nationally). About 1.6% of families and 4.28% of the population were below the poverty line, including 3.0% of those under age 18 and 4.4% of those age 65 or over.

== History ==
Brookhaven, Pennsylvania was originally part of a land grant given to William Penn in 1681 by King Charles II of England. The Proprietor negotiated with the Lenni-Lenape Indians, who were the original occupants of the land, the land was then divided into municipal districts. The area of Brookhaven was included in the Municipal District of Chester Township. 317 acres (1.3 km^{2}) were surveyed to Thomas Coebourn who settled in 1682 along with Richard Few who was granted 227 acres (0.9 km^{2}). Thomas Brassey was granted 385 acres (1.6 km^{2}) in 1684. These original grants were parceled eventually into smaller pieces of land and sold to subsequent settlers, such as Trimble, Edwards, Lister and Shepherd, among others. Many of these original settlers have streets named after them in the borough. The elementary school is named Coebourn Elementary (on Coebourn Blvd) after Thomas Coebourn and there are streets named Trimble, Edwards, Lister and Shepherd.

For approximately two hundred and fifty years, the region was dependent upon a farming and dairy economy as well as two thriving mill businesses spanning both Chester Creek and Ridley Creek. Bisected by the 1687 Edgmont Great Road, Brookhaven developed into a town of small crossroads, at Sneath's Corners in the mid-19th century. The road from Hinkson's Corners (now Brookhaven Road), was established sometime before 1816 as a service road to the mills on Ridley and to Chester Creeks in 1847. These byways became major highways and at the crossroads of these two highways grew a cluster of services, professional offices and summer homes. In 1872, the name "Brookhaven" became most widely used after it was published in the letterhead of the Beatty Brothers General Store at Sneath's (later Beatty's) Corner.

The Brookhaven community attracted numerous doctors and lawyers, and at the start of the 20th century, was a popular locale for Sunday outings amongst residents of the river tier communities.

Brookhaven's mills were perhaps its most notable commercial activity. Thomas Coebourn established the second gristmill in the new Pennsylvania colony, successfully challenging William Penn's monopoly vested in the Caleb Pusey Mill (the Caleb Pusey house is still standing) downstream on Chester Creek. After a 1687 court battle went in Coebourne's favor and granted individuals the right to establish mills, the area's creeks powered a multitude of industries. The original Coebourne Log Mill was replaced in 1750 by a stone structure which was sold to Jonathan Dutton (Dutton Mill Road is a major road in the area) in 1792. A redrawing of Chester Township's borders in 1829 placed this site in present Middletown Township, with only the mill race and the owner's mansion in Brookhaven. The Johnson Ax Factory, the Lower Bank (Todmorden-Sackville) Hair Cloth Mills, Bickley's Gristmill and the Crozer Cloth Mill all utilized the notable drop for streams from the inland plateau to power their machinery. Both the 1826 and the post-flood 1844 mill surveys show large outputs for these factories.

In the latter part of the 19th century, several large stock farms were thriving; by the 1900s most of these were consolidated under the ownership of John Price Crozer (the namesake of Crozer-Chester Medical Center in Upland) who bred racehorses and prize bulls. After Crozer's death and World War II, these farms were sold off to developers.

In 1902, the New Chester Water Company built a filtration and storage facility which then serviced the entire city and Chester Township. This plant, on Harrison's Hill, is still in active use. The Delaware Valley's rapid industrial expansion and the resulting baby boom of World War II, brought increasing pressure for suburban housing.

At the time of Brookhaven Borough's incorporation on April 4, 1945, the Borough had 672 persons and 150 homes. The trolley line which had run from Chester, Pennsylvania to Media via Edgmont Avenue stopped in 1938. The trolley tracks were removed in 1945 and the road was realigned and widened as most of the area's transportation had become automotive. In the last fifty years, Brookhaven has evolved very dramatically from a dairy and stock farm economy to a residential community of over 8,000 people living in over 3,600 homes, apartments and condominiums and supporting approximately 150 businesses.

== Retail ==
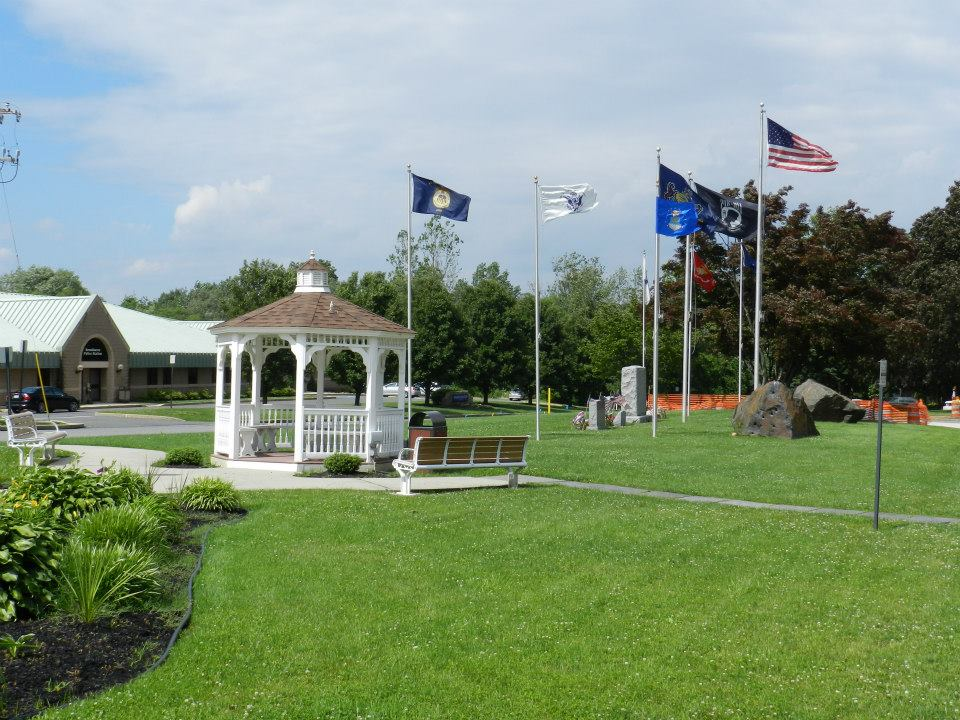
Pennsylvania 352 north of Brookhaven Road.

Cambridge Shopping Center, opened in 1972, is a Brookhaven landmark. It is currently anchored by Lowe's and was anchored by one of the first Giant stores in the Philadelphia area (now closed).

== Transportation ==
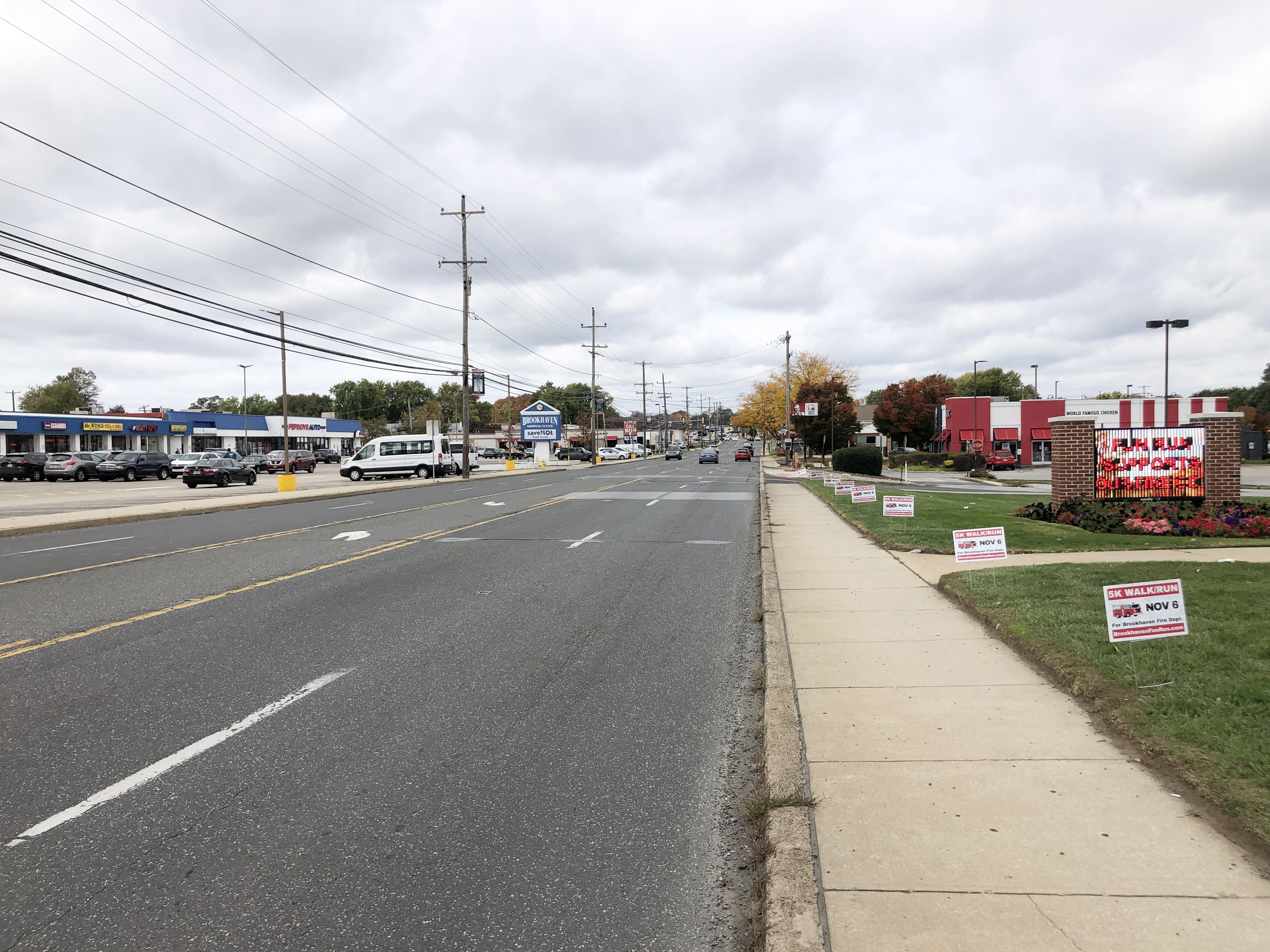
PA 352 northbound in Brookhaven

As of 2008, there were 25.78 miles (41.49 km) of public roads in Brookhaven, of which 5.17 miles (8.32 km) were maintained by the Pennsylvania Department of Transportation (PennDOT) and 20.61 miles (33.17 km) were maintained by the borough.

Pennsylvania Route 352 is the only numbered highway serving Brookhaven. It follows Edgmont Avenue along a southeast-to-northwest alignment though the central portion of the borough.

Brookhaven is approximately 15 minutes away from South Philadelphia and 20 minutes from Wilmington, Delaware.

== Education ==
Brookhaven is a part of the Penn-Delco School District. It is also home to Coebourn Elementary School.

Our Lady of Charity School of the Roman Catholic Archdiocese of Philadelphia was in Brookhaven. It closed in 2011 due to a decrease in the number of students. During the 2010-2011 school year, it had 176 students, along with 89 prospective students for the 2011-2012 school year who did not arrive. The Delco Times stated that had the school remained open, it would have had to reduce enrichment services. At least one grade level would have had an enrollment under five. The average class size would have been nine.

== Athletics ==
Brookhaven is home to Brookhaven Babe Ruth Baseball, a youth baseball league that operates out of Scott Park. Brookhaven also has a youth Basketball league that operates out of the Brookhaven Municipal Center.

== Notable people ==
- Harold J. Lavell, US Army major general
