= Samuel B. Sneath =

American Businessman

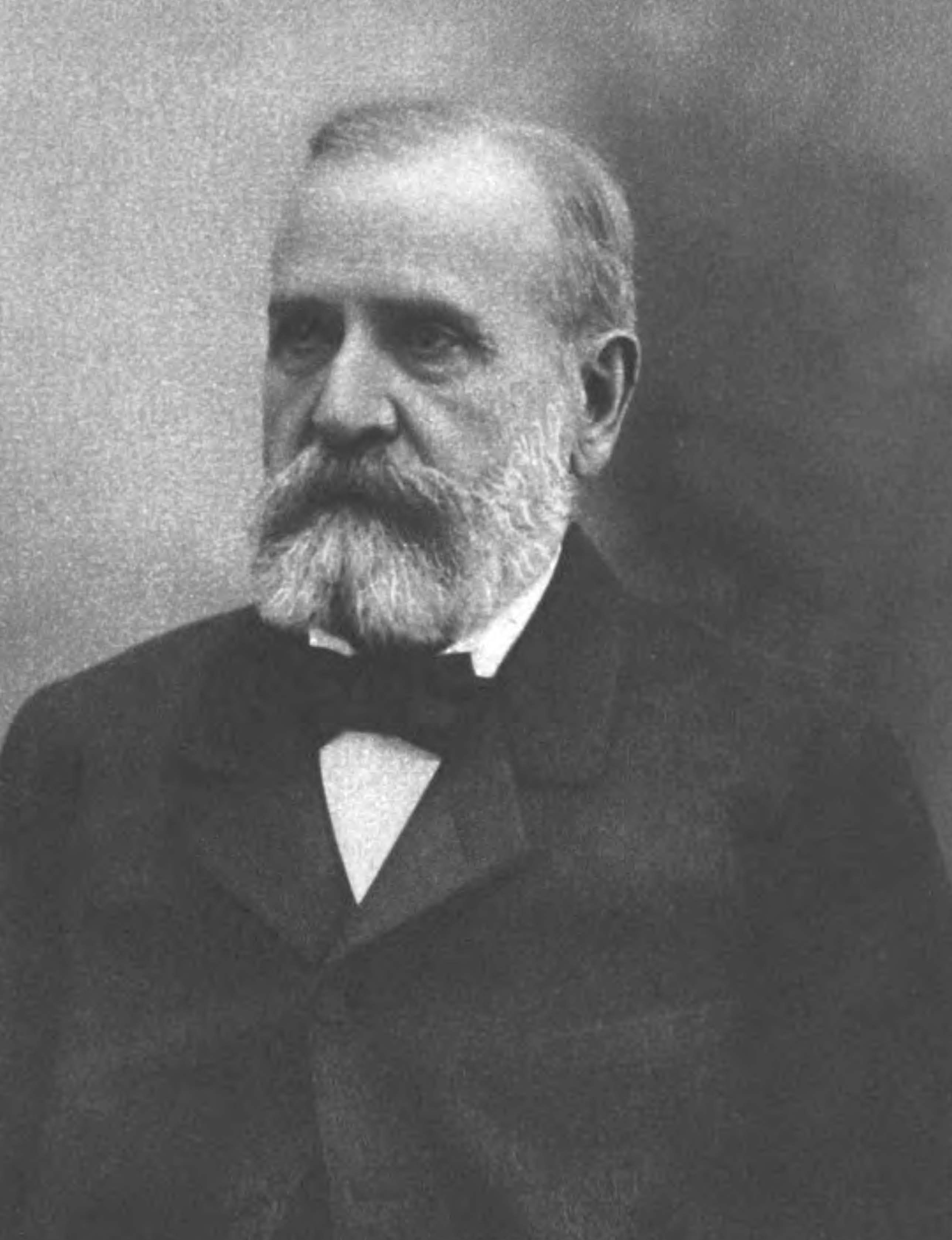
- Samuel B. Sneath
- Born: December 19, 1828; Tiffin, Ohio
- Died: January 7, 1915; Pass Christian, Mississippi
- Occupation: Capitalist
- Known for: Banker, railroad owner, manufacturer
- Spouse(s): Mary L. Davis (died 1868); Laura A. Stephenson
- Children: Frances Sneath Niles, Ralph Davis Sneath, Marian Sneath Wilson, Richard W. Sneath

Signature
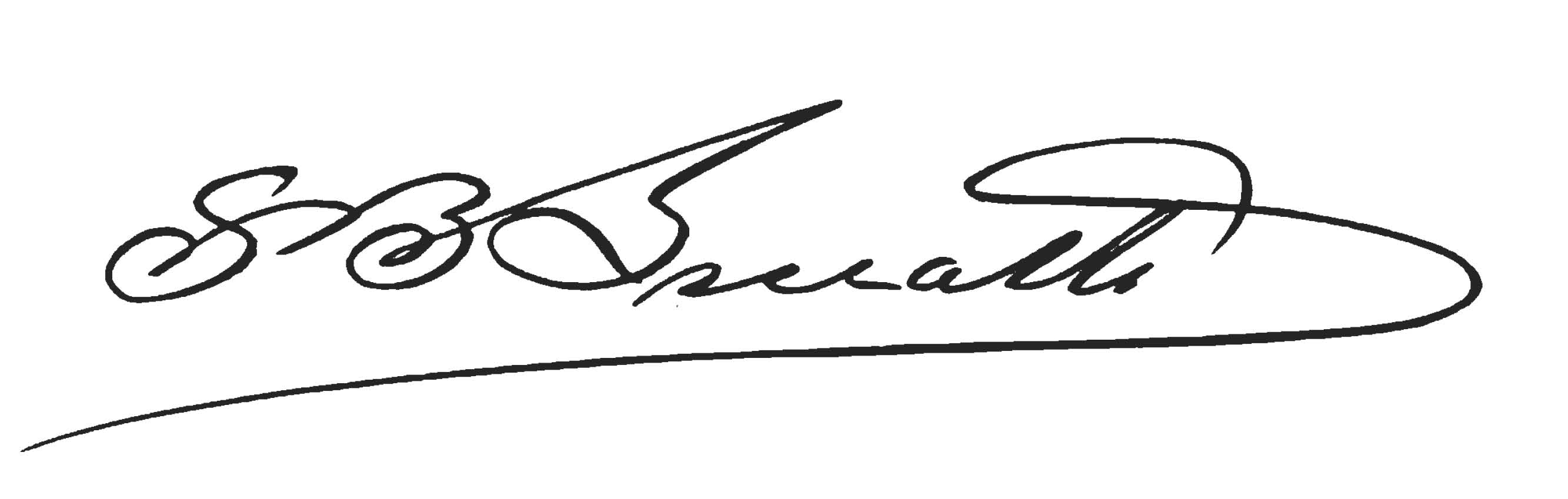

Samuel Baugher Sneath (December 19, 1828 – January 7, 1915) was an American businessman involved in banking, railroading, and manufacturing.” Sneath and his wife Laura were also philanthropists, and the Samuel B. Sneath Memorial Publication Fund was established by Mrs. Sneath with a gift to the Divinity School of Yale University.

Sneath was born, raised, and educated in Tiffin, Ohio. He was 13 years old when his father died, and two years later began working full time at the family fanning mill. His early business ventures included a dry goods store and a grain firm. Later he became involved with businesses as diverse as the Sneath Glass Company, National Exchange Bank of Tiffin, and the Tiffin, Fostoria, and Eastern Electric Railway.

Sneath's brother Richard G. Sneath and cousin A. G. Sneath were also involved in banking, as was Sneath's son Ralph Davis Sneath. Most of the Sneath siblings moved to California, but Samuel and son Ralph remained in Ohio for much of their lives. The Sneath family became some of the most prominent bankers in the United States by the beginning of the 20th century, and continued to be notable into the 1960s.

== Identity and origins ==
Samuel Sneath's grandfather, George Sneath, was a Scotsman who emigrated to the North American Province of Pennsylvania prior to the American Revolutionary War. The family settled in Delaware County, Pennsylvania, and the Sneath family home was at a cross roads village that became known as “Sneath's Corner” and is now part of Brookhaven, Pennsylvania. (Note: At least one source says George Sneath and his children were from Delaware—possibly confusing Delaware County, Pennsylvania, with the nearby state of Delaware.) George's son Richard eventually moved to Maryland, and married Catherine Baugher. In 1826, the couple moved to Tiffin, Ohio. A son, Samuel Baugher Sneath was born in their Tiffin home on December 19, 1828, and the couple eventually had eight children. Richard Sneath was involved in manufacturing and the mercantile business.

Samuel Sneath was only 13 years old when his father, Richard, died. He continued to attend public schools until he was 15, and then began working at his father's fanning mill. He later began working at a dry goods store as a clerk, and worked in this position for about three years. In 1853 he partnered with Jesse Shriver to form a clothing and dry goods business named Shriver & Sneath. After eight years in this business he sold his interest in the company and began his involvement in the produce business, later expanding into the grain business.

== Personal life ==
Sneath was married in 1861 to Mary L. Davis. They had two children: Frances Sneath, and Ralph Davis Sneath. Mary died in 1868, and Sneath remarried in 1879 to Laura A. Stephenson. They had two children: Marian Lee Sneath, and Richard W. Sneath (died 1894). Sneath died on January 7, 1915. Among his siblings was an older brother, Richard George Sneath, who was a banker that moved to San Francisco in 1850.

== Businesses ==
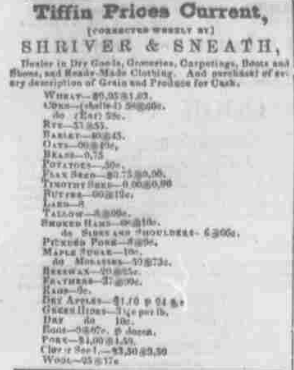
Newspaper advertisement

- Shriver & Sneath – Dry goods business began 1853 when Sneath partnered with Jesse Shriver. Sneath sold his portion of the business eight years later.
- Grain - The firm Sneath & Cunningham was incorporated as Sneath–Cunningham Company in 1906 and controlled 32 grain elevators in five Ohio counties. Originally the partnership was between Samuel Sneath and Arthur Cunningham, but later Sneath's son Ralph D. Sneath was involved.
- National Exchange Bank of Tiffin – Sneath was one of the incorporators of this bank, which began in 1865.
- Tiffin Woolen Mills – formed in 1867 by a group of investors that included Rezin Shawham, Samuel B. Sneath and his brother A.G. Sneath, and five others. By 1882, Shawhan was the sole owner.
- Commercial Bank of Tiffin – Sneath was involved in the organization of this bank. He served as cashier for many years and eventually became its president. Served as one of the bank's directors until his death.
- Interstate Trust and Banking Co. - This New Orleans company opened for business during July 1902, and a statement for 1910 lists S.B. Sneath as one of the directors.
- Mortgage Securities Co. of New Orleans
- Western Pottery Co.
- National Machinery Co. - Sneath was an investor in this company which was established in 1874 in Cleveland. The company, which manufactured tools, moved to Tiffin in 1882.
- Sneath Glass Company - Sneath was one of the main stockholders of this glass company when it was formed in Tiffin, Ohio. He continued to be a stockholder after the plant was moved to Indiana.
- Tiffin Fostoria & Eastern Electric Railway Co. - Sneath was president and general manager of this company during 1900. He was also listed as the owner.
- Tiffin City Railway
- Tiffin, Fostoria, and Eastern Railroad
- Riverview Park
- Webster Manufacturing plant

== Organizations and philanthropy ==
Oakley Park – land donated by Warren P. Noble, Samuel B. Sneath, and J. W. Shaufelberger in 1888.

== Notes ==
=== References ===
- Baughman, Abraham J. (1911). History of Seneca County, Ohio; a narrative account of its historical progress, its people, and its principal interests. Chicago, New York: Lewis Publishing Company. p. 372. OCLC 807045. "A.G. Sneath."
- Barnes, Myron B. (1982). Between the Eighties : Tiffin, Ohio 1880-1980. Tiffin, OH: Seneca County Museum Foundation. OCLC 9065206.
- Daughters of the American Revolution - Dolly Todd Madison Chapter - Tiffin, Ohio (1915). Ohio early state and local history. Columbus, Ohio: Spahr & Glenn. OCLC 3558027.
- Leeson, Michael A., ed. (1886). History of Seneca County, Ohio; Containing a history of the county, its townships, towns, villages, schools, churches, industries, etc.; portraits of early settlers and prominent men; biographies; history of the northwest territory; history of Ohio; statistical and miscellaneous matter, etc., etc . Chicago: Warner, Beers, and Company. OCLC 4280389.
- Shimansky, O.K., ed. (1914). "State Organizations". Ohio Almanac and Handbook of Information. Cleveland, Ohio: United Press Association: 30–36. OCLC 468455.
- Unlisted (A Centennial...) (1902). A Centennial Biographical History of Seneca County, Ohio... Chicago: Lewis Publishing Company. OCLC 1011666845.
- Unlisted (American Street) (1903). "Ohio - American Street Railway Investments". American Street Railway Investments. 10. New York: McGraw Publishing Company: 199–219. OCLC 5352115.
- Unlisted (Electrical World) (August 25, 1900). "The Electric Railway". Electrical World and Engineer. XXXVI (8). New York: Electrical World and Engineer Inc.: 303–304. OCLC 1780149.
- Unlisted (Grain Dealers) (October 25, 1906). "Grain Trade News - Ohio". Grain Dealers Journal. XVII (8). Chicago, Illinois: Grain Dealers Company: 473–475. OCLC 49452099.
- Unlisted (National Cyclopaedia) (1920). "Sneath, Samuel Baugher". The National Cyclopaedia of American Biography. XVII. New York: James. T. White & Company. OCLC 1759175.
- Unlisted (The Bay of San Francisco...) (1892). The Bay of San Francisco: the metropolis of the Pacific Coast and its suburban cities : a history Volume II. Chicago: Lewis Publishing Company. OCLC 8666576.
- Young, W.L. (1912). "State banking Department - State Banks of Louisiana". Report of the State Banking Department of Louisiana (1910 and 1911, Part 1). 9. New Orleans, Louisiana: Examiner of State Banks: 18–457. OCLC 234358812.
