= Otsego Independents =

The Otsego Independents was a white minor league baseball team in Otsego, Michigan in the early 1900s. It was owned by paper industry magnate George E. Bardeen and was a member of the Michigan State League.

- Location: Otsego, MI
- League: Michigan State League
- Ballpark: Memorial Park (probably Diamond #6)

The team is best known for its 1902 season, during which their star pitcher was the legendary Andrew Rube Foster. Foster proved his talent by striking out Neal Ball of the Three Rivers team, who would go on to play for the Cleveland Naps in the Major Leagues and became famous as the first player in history to complete an unassisted triple play in a Major League game. Foster was signed by the Cuban X-Giants Negro league team the following year and pitched that team to the 1903 Colored Championship title.

After Foster's departure, Negro leaguer Pedro Pratt was recruited to the team from Portland, Michigan by former Portland citizens Melvin Gamble and Gale Newman. Newman was a member of Bardeen's pitching staff.

In 2000, the Otsego City Council approved the placement of a monument to Foster at Memorial Park.

== Hall of Fame alumni ==
- Rube Foster, from the Independents' 1902 season, was posthumously inducted into the Baseball Hall of Fame in 1981.
