= Otsego, Michigan =

- City
- Location of Otsego, Michigan
- Coordinates: 42°27′29″N 85°41′55″W
- Country: United States
- State: Michigan
- County: Allegan

Area
  - Total: 2.09 sq mi (5.42 km^{2})
  - Land: 2.03 sq mi (5.26 km^{2})
  - Water: 0.062 sq mi (0.16 km^{2})
- Elevation: 709 ft (216 m)

Population (2020)
  - Total: 4,120
  - Density: 2,028.1/sq mi (783.07/km^{2})
- Time zone: UTC-5 (Eastern (EST))
  - Summer (DST): UTC-4 (EDT)
- ZIP code: 49078
- Area code: 269
- FIPS code: 26-61620
- GNIS feature ID: 0634156
- Website: www.cityofotsego.org

Otsego is a city in Allegan County in the U.S. state of Michigan. The population was 4,120 at the 2020 census. The city is within Otsego Township, but is administratively autonomous.

Otsego is situated on M-89 about three miles (4.8 km) west of Plainwell and US 131. It is about nine miles (14 km) southeast of Allegan, seventeen miles (27 km) north of Kalamazoo, and the Kalamazoo River flows east to west through the city.

== History ==
Otsego was established in fall of 1831 by the Samuel Foster family from Vermont, called Pine Creek by its initial settlers: Giles Scott and Hull Sherwood. A post office was established in 1832 under the name of Allegan. With the organization of Allegan County, the name was changed in 1835 to Otsego, spearheaded by Otsego resident Dr. Samuel Foster; the name is after Otsego Lake in New York, and originally from an Iroquoian language, probably Mohawk or Oneida. A school was established in the town in 1833, and a hotel, the Tompkins House, followed in the 1860s.

On June 6, 1863, at Aaron Hilliard's house Ellen G. White, a founder of the Seventh-day Adventist church, experienced a vision about health and disease, and it showed vegetarian food, as was described in Genesis 1:29, was the proper food for humankind. Her vision led to the creation of many vegetarian foods and vegetarian food companies, including the Battle Creek Sanitarium and Loma Linda Foods.

In the 1870s, visitors from all over the Midwest journeyed to Otsego to experience the "medicinal" waters at the Otsego Mineral Springs Bath House, which remained a regional draw until 1887 when George Bardeen's paper mill operation depleted the town's mineral springs.

The 1880s saw some big advances for Otsego. In 1883, Otsego High School held its first commencement ceremony, graduating three students; a home-delivery milk route was started up in 1885; and 1886 brought the establishment of the volunteer fire department, which initially used horse-drawn water-wagons. The decade closed out with the formation of the city's Republican Club in 1888.

In 1881, Wilson C. Edsell built the town's first bank and opera house. Edsell's Opera House was the primary entertainment venue in town for many years until the opening of the Nickelodeon (Irv Nichols's theatre venture) in 1909. An Uncle Tom's Cabin troupe played the Opera House stage on an annual basis. Native American vaudeville shows, called medicine shows, were popular. Maro the Magician, stock theater groups, minstrel shows took the opera house stage on a regular basis, with the minstrel shows led by the town's one African American resident Jim Smith.

The city's baseball park was sold to the area Catholics as a site for a church in 1890. The Russell Buggy Company came to town as well, making popular ironclad carriages. The Bardeen Mansion was completed in 1894, which was razed in 1962–63. A smallpox epidemic swept the town in 1894, as well.

During the 1902 baseball season, Otsego was home to Negro league baseball great Andrew "Rube" Foster, who played for George E. Bardeen's Michigan State League white semi-professional team, the Otsego Independents, before signing on as a pitcher with the Cuban X-Giants, considered by many to be the greatest team in Negro leagues history. He would later be instrumental in the founding of the Negro National League. For a time, Otsego had a "Rube Street," but it was renamed "Washington Street." On 17 April 2000, John Chapman, a local elementary teacher, petitioned the City Council to have one of the six baseball diamonds at Memorial Park renamed in Foster's honor. The city approved placement of a monument to him at the park by a 3–1 vote.

A flu epidemic struck 800 residents, killing some, in 1918.

Otsego was struck by a tornado in 1962, uprooting trees and wiping out electricity/telephone services for several days.

== Geography ==
According to the United States Census Bureau, the city has a total area of 2.13 square miles (5.52 km^{2}), of which 2.07 square miles (5.36 km^{2}) is land and 0.06 square miles (0.16 km^{2}) is water.

== Demographics ==
Historical population
Census	Pop.	Note	%±
1870	994		—
1880	1,000		0.6%
1890	1,626		62.6%
1900	2,073		27.5%
1910	2,812		35.6%
1920	3,168		12.7%
1930	3,245		2.4%
1940	3,428		5.6%
1950	3,990		16.4%
1960	4,142		3.8%
1970	3,957		−4.5%
1980	3,802		−3.9%
1990	3,937		3.6%
2000	3,933		−0.1%
2010	3,956		0.6%
2020	4,120		4.1%
U.S. Decennial Census

=== 2020 census ===
As of the 2020 census, Otsego had a population of 4,120. The median age was 37.2 years. 23.6% of residents were under the age of 18 and 15.4% of residents were 65 years of age or older. For every 100 females there were 93.0 males, and for every 100 females age 18 and over there were 91.4 males age 18 and over.

100.0% of residents lived in urban areas, while 0.0% lived in rural areas.

There were 1,657 households in Otsego, of which 31.5% had children under the age of 18 living in them. Of all households, 45.0% were married-couple households, 17.8% were households with a male householder and no spouse or partner present, and 28.8% were households with a female householder and no spouse or partner present. About 29.6% of all households were made up of individuals and 12.2% had someone living alone who was 65 years of age or older.

There were 1,739 housing units, of which 4.7% were vacant. The homeowner vacancy rate was 1.2% and the rental vacancy rate was 4.2%.

Racial composition as of the 2020 census
Race	Number	Percent
White	3,742	90.8%
Black or African American	36	0.9%
American Indian and Alaska Native	21	0.5%
Asian	59	1.4%
Native Hawaiian and Other Pacific Islander	0	0.0%
Some other race	67	1.6%
Two or more races	195	4.7%
Hispanic or Latino (of any race)	134	3.3%

=== 2010 census ===
As of the census of 2010, there were 3,956 people, 1,597 households, and 1,064 families living in the city. The population density was 1,911.1 inhabitants per square mile (737.9/km^{2}). There were 1,716 housing units at an average density of 829.0 per square mile (320.1/km^{2}). The racial makeup of the city was 95.2% White, 0.6% African American, 0.3% Native American, 0.5% Asian, 1.2% from other races, and 2.1% from two or more races. Hispanic or Latino of any race were 3.3% of the population.

There were 1,597 households, of which 36.7% had children under the age of 18 living with them, 47.0% were married couples living together, 15.0% had a female householder with no husband present, 4.6% had a male householder with no wife present, and 33.4% were non-families. 27.9% of all households were made up of individuals, and 12.5% had someone living alone who was 65 years of age or older. The average household size was 2.47 and the average family size was 3.00.

The median age in the city was 36.1 years. 27.6% of residents were under the age of 18; 7.5% were between the ages of 18 and 24; 26.3% were from 25 to 44; 25.5% were from 45 to 64; and 13.1% were 65 years of age or older. The gender makeup of the city was 47.1% male and 52.9% female.

=== 2000 census ===
As of the census of 2000, there were 3,934 people, 1,553 households, and 1,062 families living in the city. The population density was 1,971 inhabitants per square mile (761/km^{2}). There were 1,632 housing units at an average density of 817.9 per square mile (315.8/km^{2}). The racial makeup of the city was 97.10% White, 0.31% African American, 0.56% Native American, 0.38% Asian, 0.33% from other races, and 1.32% from two or more races. Hispanic or Latino of any race were 1.50% of the population.

There were 1,553 households, out of which 36.3% had children under the age of 18 living with them, 49.6% were married couples living together, 14.3% had a female householder with no husband present, and 31.6% were non-families. 26.3% of all households were made up of individuals, and 10.6% had someone living alone who was 65 years of age or older. The average household size was 2.51 and the average family size was 3.00.

In the city, the population was spread out, with 28.0% under the age of 18, 8.6% from 18 to 24, 31.6% from 25 to 44, 19.6% from 45 to 64, and 12.2% who were 65 years of age or older. The median age was 34 years. For every 100 females, there were 92.0 males. For every 100 females age 18 and over, there were 85.5 males.

The median income for a household in the city was $37,525, and the median income for a family was $44,308. Males had a median income of $36,429 versus $25,054 for females. The per capita income for the city was $17,521. About 4.6% of families and 6.9% of the population were below the poverty line, including 7.9% of those under age 18 and 9.7% of those age 65 or over.

== Culture ==
"Otsego" is a recurring mention in industrial metal band Static-X's material, with songs named after the town including "Otsegolation", "Otsego Undead" and "Otsegolectric"; frontman Wayne Static attended Western Michigan University and at the time used a fake ID that claimed he was "Dean from Otsego".

== Education ==
Otsego is home to Otsego Public Schools, which includes Alamo Elementary (located in Alamo Township), Dix Street Elementary, Washington Street Elementary (formerly Allegan Street Elementary), Otsego Middle School, Otsego High School, and the West Campus High School.

== Notable people ==
- Forman Brown (1901–1996), songwriter, composer, author
- Sid Conrad (1923–2010), TV character actor
- Hon. Wilson C. Edsell, state senator, Olivet College founder, founder of first national bank in Otsego, D.M. Canright supporter
- Phil Regan, major league baseball pitcher, manager and coach
- Kevin VanDam, professional bass fisher, BASS Angler of the Year (1992, 1996, 1999, 2008, 2009); graduated from Otsego High School
