= Kalamazoo Stove Company =

The Kalamazoo Stove Company (1902–1952) of Kalamazoo, Michigan operated with the slogan "A Kalamazoo ~ Direct to You." This was one of the first manufacturing plants to deal directly with the customer instead of employing the use of retail stores.

Kalamazoo Stove produced several million stoves and furnaces over its fifty-year existence, 100,000 of these in its peak production year, 1937. That year, the name was changed to Kalamazoo Stove and Furnace Company.

Among the innovations in stove design that came out of this company were the oven door window, which allowed the user to see what was being cooked without opening the door, and a thermometer mounted on the oven door.

The fact that most of their models were powered by wood or coal resulted in the company's demise in 1952, with their customer base shifting to gas and electric models offered by other companies.
