= Flawn Academic Center =

Library at the University of Texas at Austin

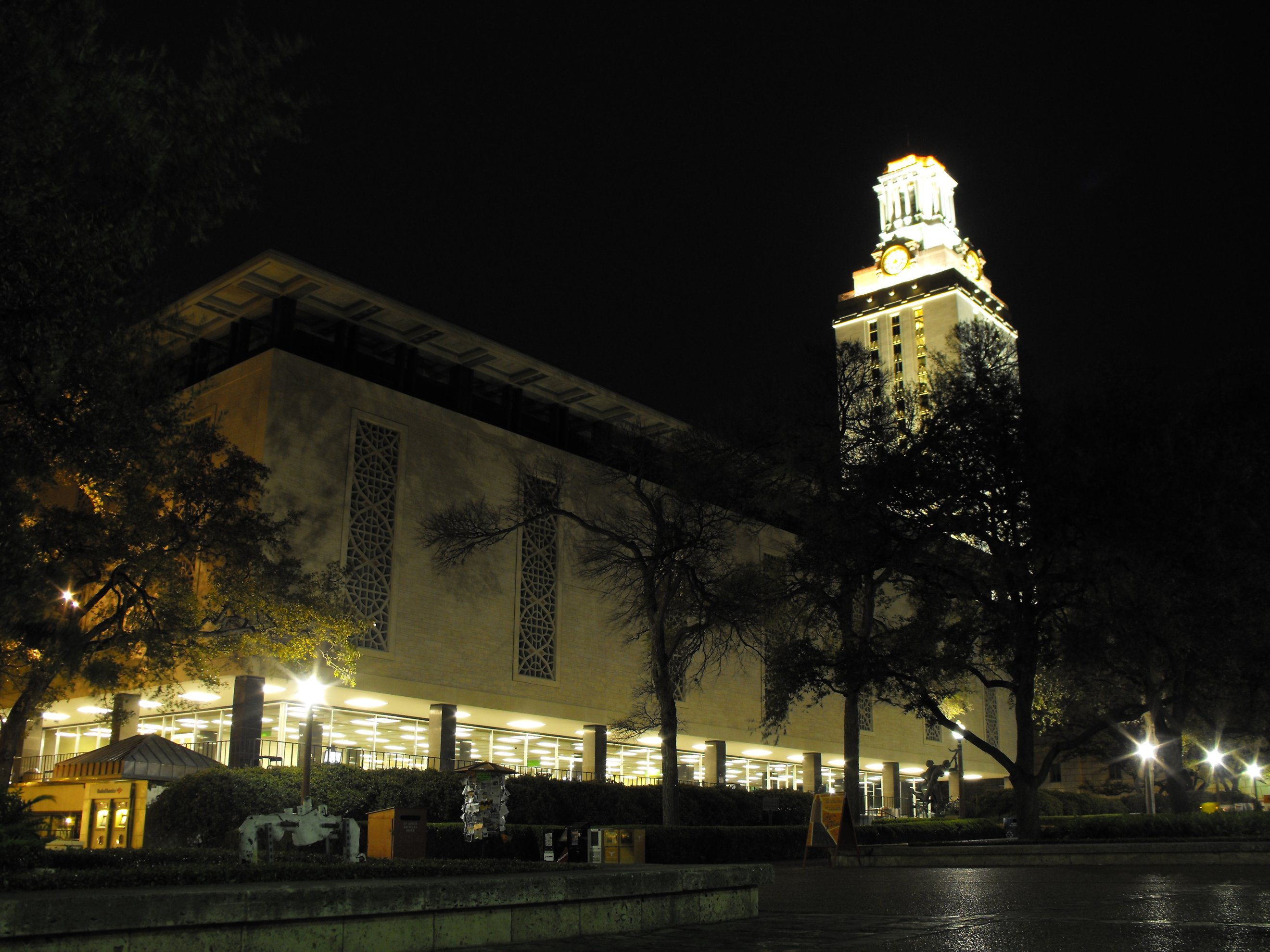
- The Flawn Academic Center, with the Main Building in the background
- Interactive map of the Flawn Academic Center area
- Former names: "Harry's Place", Undergraduate Library and Academic Center

General information
- Location: Austin, Texas, United States
- Coordinates: 30.286259°N 97.740319°W

The Peter T. Flawn Academic Center (abbreviated FAC, formerly the Undergraduate Library and Academic Center) is an undergraduate library and "technology and collaboration" facility located on the University of Texas at Austin campus. The center, named after former university president Peter T. Flawn in 1983, opened between 1963 and 1964. Upon its opening, the building featured the first open-stack library on campus for undergraduates along with much of the Humanities Research Center.

Among the permanent displays in the Center's Leeds Gallery is a re-creation of Perry Mason creator Erle Stanley Gardner's study along with personal effects. Charles Umlauf's sculpture The Torchbearers is located at the front of the building.

== History ==
The undergraduate library was constructed at a cost of $4.7 million, not including the price of the 60,000 volumes it originally housed.

In 2005 the library underwent a major change by removing 90,000 volumes to other libraries within the university system and replacing them with "250 desktop computers... 75 laptops available for checkout, wireless Internet access, computer labs, software suites, a multimedia studio, a computer help desk and repair shop, and a café." According to Fred Heath, vice provost for the general libraries, claimed that the University of Texas remains the nation's fifth-largest academic library with more than 8 million volumes.

In recent years, the facility has seen occasional usage as a student voting site for various elections.

== Features ==
The fourth floor contains the Humanities Research Center's Leeds Gallery.
