= Kay Buena =

American singer-songwriter

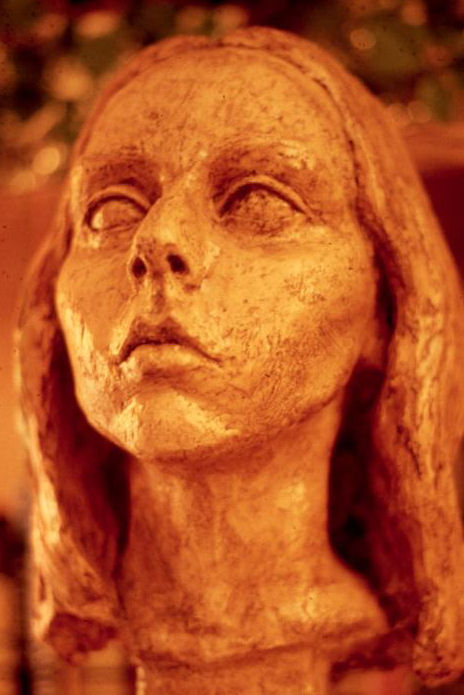
- Self portrait for Charles Umlauf (1970)
- Born: Caroline Patricia Abbitt; October 26, 1947; Austin, Texas
- Education: The University of Texas at Austin
- Known for: Sculpture, Music

Kay Buena is an American singer-songwriter, musician, artist, jeweler and writer based in Austin, Texas. She is best known for "Comp Carnage", music and performance art expressing frustration with computers, and for recordings that were popular on MP3.com in the early days of that site.

== Comp Carnage ==
Comp Carnage consisted primarily of videos of Kay and friends shooting computers and an accompanying music video, "Ode to Geeks". As one of the first efforts of this nature, it gained coverage in The Register, which conducted a contest to give away one of the "victims".

== MP3.com ==
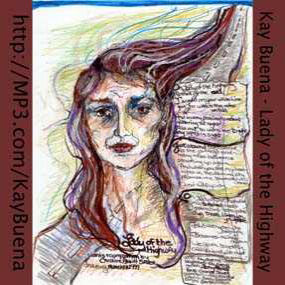
Lady of the Highway CD cover

When MP3.com became popular in 1999, Kay Buena made some of her recordings available there, with strong response and some commercial success with CD's such as Lady of the Highway. "Lonely Man" was particularly popular with the MP3.com staff and featured on a collection CD. She has retained copyright to her songs and made CDs available.
