= Madonna and Child (Umlauf) =

Series of sculptures by Charles Umlauf

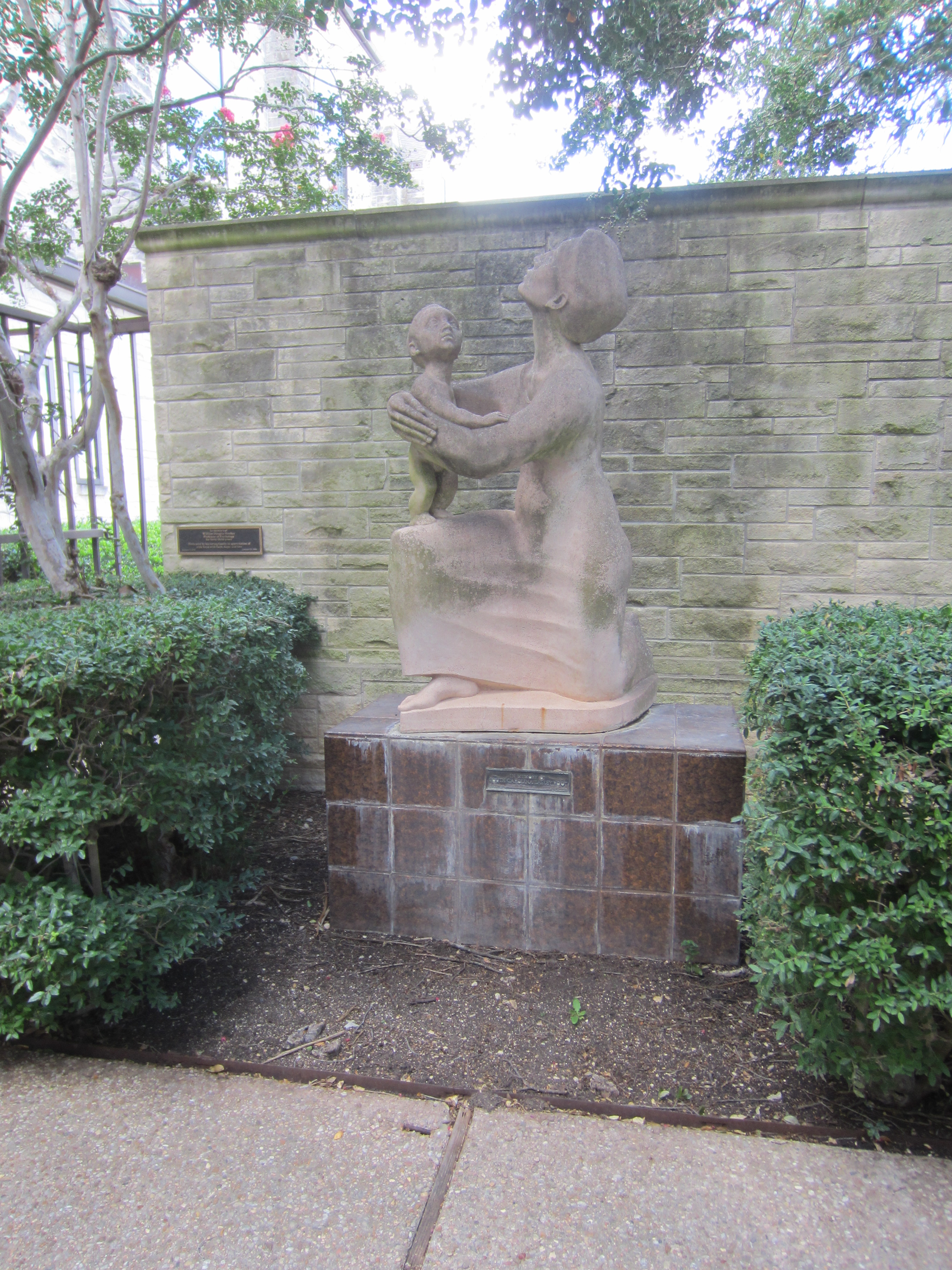
- Sculpture on the Southwestern University campus in 2018
- Artist: Charles Umlauf

Madonna and Child is a series of sculptures by Charles Umlauf. Versions are found in the collections of the Umlauf Sculpture Garden and Museum (Austin, Texas) and the Dallas Museum of Art. One limestone sculpture is installed outside the Lois Perkins Chapel on the Southwestern University campus in Georgetown, Texas. The artwork was installed on September 1, 1953, as a gift to the university from alumna Margarett Root Brown in memory of her mother.

== See also ==
- Monstrance for a Grey Horse, another artwork installed at Southwestern University
