= National Blueberry Festival =

Food festival in South Haven, Michigan

National Blueberry Festival South Haven Blueberry Festival
- Status: active
- Genre: food festival
- Frequency: Annually
- Location: South Haven, Michigan
- Coordinates: 42°24′11″N 86°16′25″W
- Country: United States
- Years active: 62–63
- Inaugurated: 1963
- Attendance: Family and local community
- Website: www.blueberryfestival.com

The National Blueberry Festival, also known as the South Haven Blueberry Festival, is held in South Haven, Michigan every year in August.It is annually hosted every second weekend in the Month of August. It is one of the longest-running blueberry festivals in the United States and began calling itself a national festival in 1969.

There are about nearly 50,000 people that attend every year.

Many events were reduced in 2020 because of the COVID-19 pandemic.

Background

The National Blueberry festival was initially conceived by locals to honor the blueberry harvest. This event holds significance as South Haven is a major hub for blueberry production. There are parades, live music performances, arts and crafts shows, a classic car show, and even blueberry-themed athletic competitions.

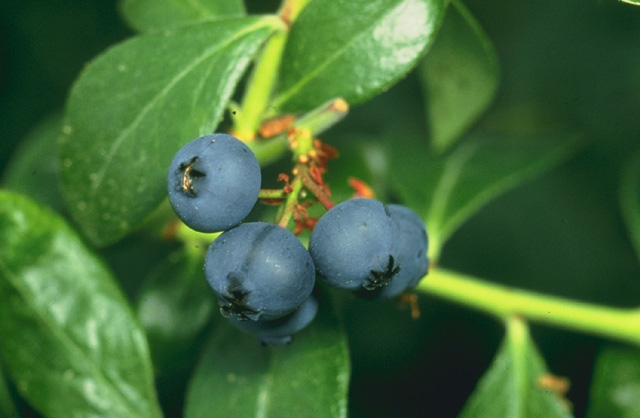
Ripe blueberry ready to be harvested.
