= South Haven Light =

Lighthouse in Michigan, United States

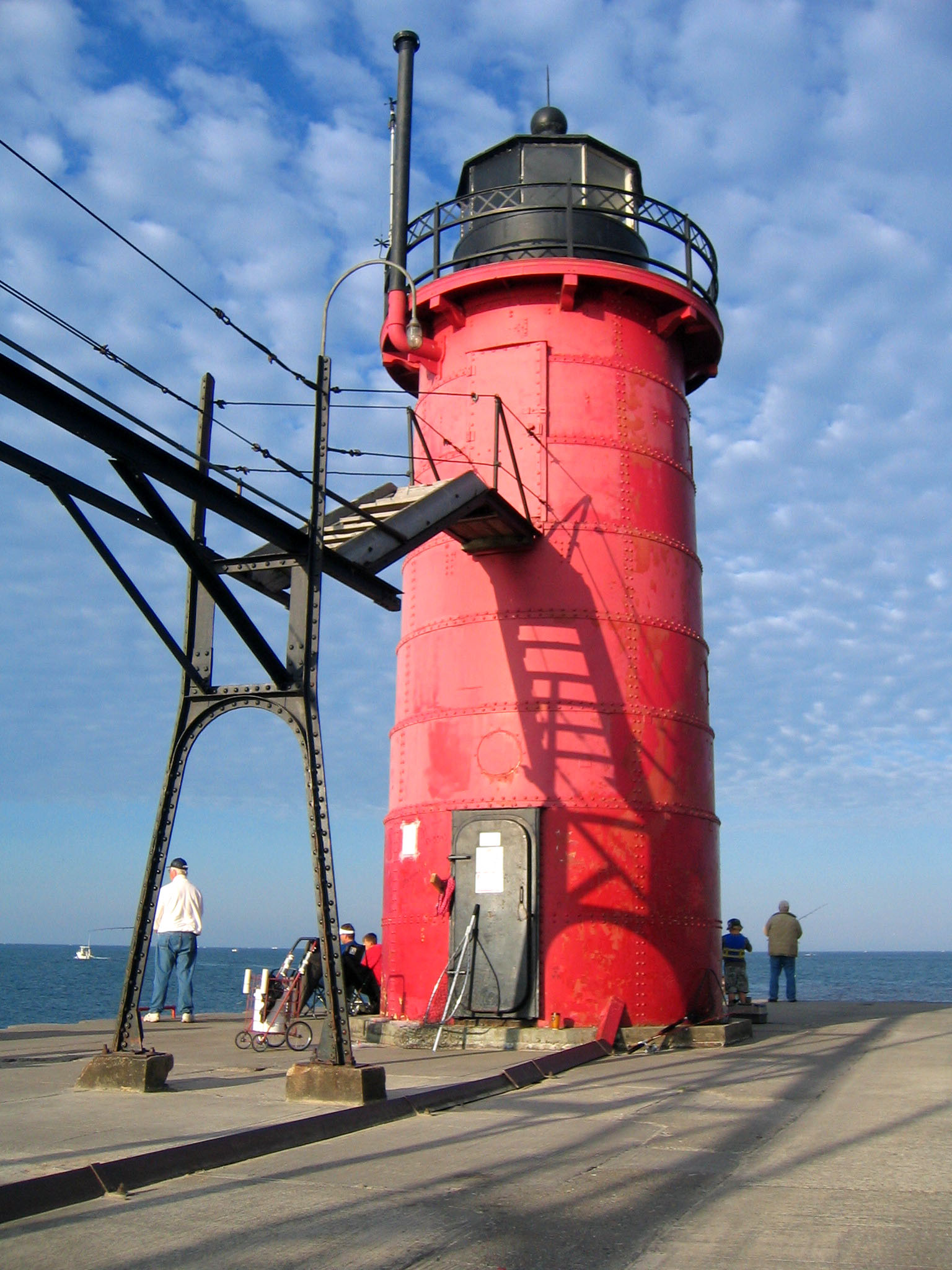
- South Pierhead Light
- Location: South Haven, Michigan
- Coordinates: 42°24′08″N 86°17′04″W

Tower
- Constructed: 1872
- Foundation: Pier
- Construction: Cast iron
- Height: 35 feet (11 m)
- Shape: Cylindrical w/catwalk
- Markings: red/black lantern, parapet and markings
- Heritage: National Register of Historic Places listed place, Michigan State Historic Site
- Fog signal: HORN: 2 blast ev 30s (2s bl- 2s si-2s bl-24s si). Diaphone.

Light
- First lit: 1903
- Focal height: 37 feet (11 m)
- Lens: Fifth order Fresnel lens (original), Sixth order Fresnel lens (current)
- Range: 13 nautical miles (24 km; 15 mi)
- Characteristic: Fl R 4 seconds
- Navigation Structures at South Haven Harbor, Michigan
- U.S. National Register of Historic Places
- Michigan State Historic Site
- NRHP reference No.: 95001160
- Added to NRHP: October 23, 1995

The South Haven South Pierhead Light is a lighthouse in Michigan, at the entrance to the Black River on Lake Michigan. The station was lit in 1872, and is still operational. The tower is a shortened version of the Muskegon South Pierhead Light, and replaced an 1872 wooden tower. The catwalk is original and still links the tower to shore: it is one of only four that survive in the State of Michigan.

== History ==
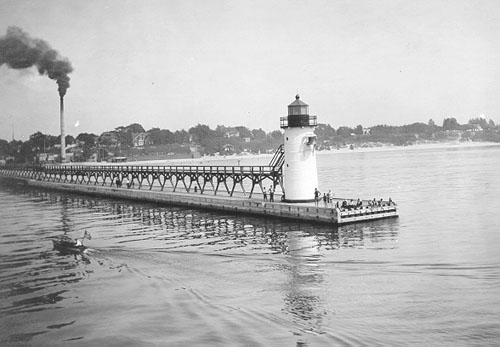
U.S. Coast Guard Archive

The keeper's house is on shore, 2-1/2 stories tall, wood with a hipped-roof. It was also built in 1872, and is located at 91 Michigan Avenue onshore, was transferred to the city for preservation in 2000. The Michigan Maritime Museum has renovated the keeper's house as the Marialyce Canonie Great Lakes Research Library.

A Fifth order Fresnel lens manufactured by Parisian glass makers Barbier and Fenestre was installed in the lantern.

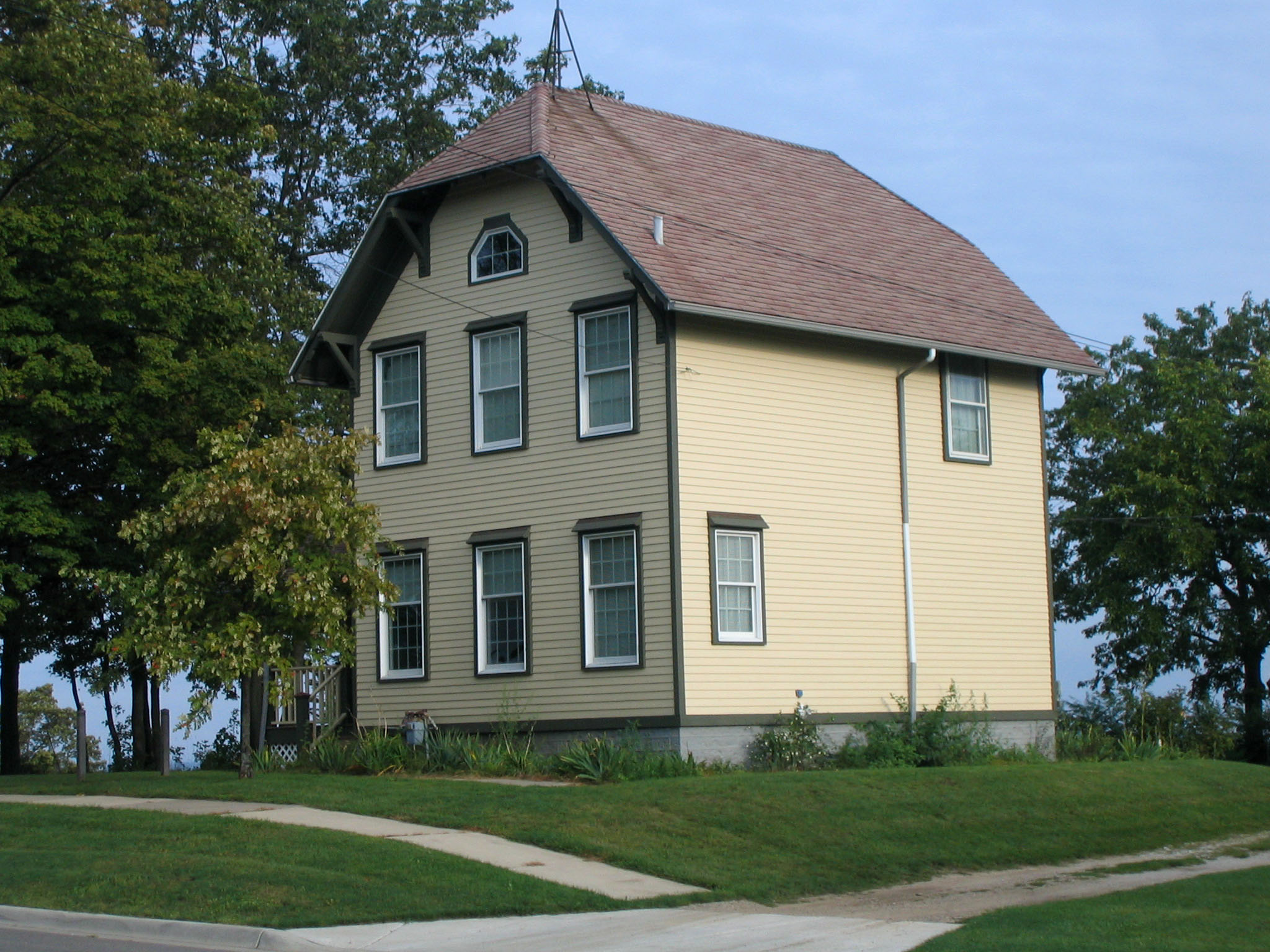
1872 Lightkeeper's dwelling, looking towards Lake Michigan

The current tower was designed by Eleventh District engineer James G. Warren.

The U.S. Lighthouse Service elected to tear down the wooden lighthouse and replace it. On October 6, 1903 ten workers arrived on the USLHS tender Hyacinth and began the project. It took a little more than a month to complete the project. According to The Daily Tribune (October 14, 1903) the lantern room was brought from Muskegon, Michigan where it had spent forty years on duty.

In 1913, the location was deemed unsatisfactory, and the cast iron lighthouse was moved 425 feet (130 m) to the end of the pier.

In 1999, Lighthouse Digest published an extensive article on the light, filled with interesting anecdotes and ephemera.

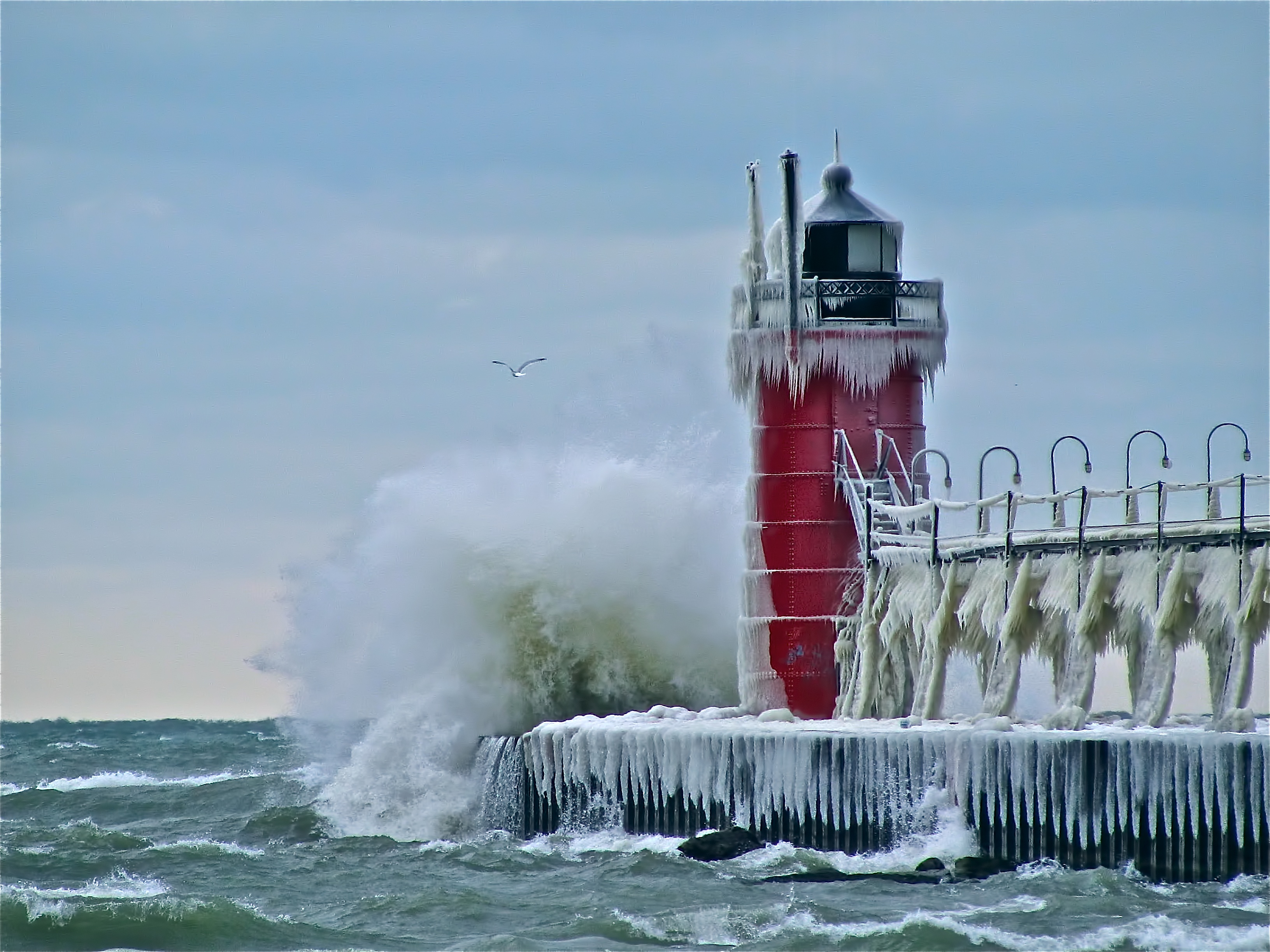
The Light in December 2010

== Directions ==
In 2005 this museum reported it was "in the process" of acquiring the lighthouse. It is accessible to the public, and located on the south pier at the mouth of the Black River, at the end of Water Street. Located at the end of the pier at the foot of Water Street in South Haven. One can get there by walking the pier after parking in the nearby city park. The site is open, but the tower is closed (except for open house during the city's mid-June Harborfest).

== See also ==
- Lighthouses in the United States
