= Monstrance for a Grey Horse =

Sculpture in Georgetown, Texas, U.S.

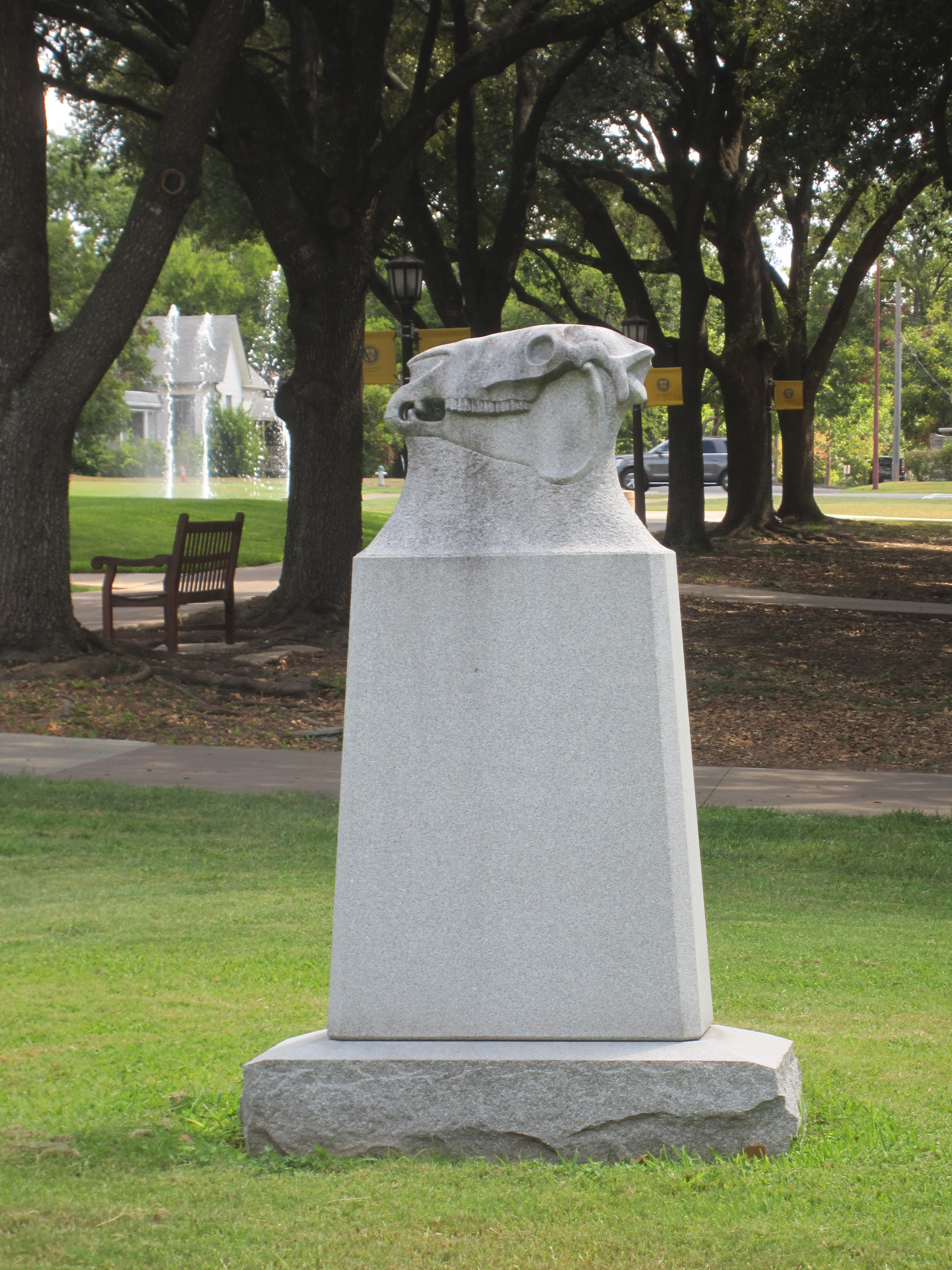
- The sculpture in 2018
- Artist: James Acord
- Medium: Granite sculpture
- Location: Georgetown, Texas, United States; 30°38′4.6″N 97°39′55.5″W

Monstrance for a Grey Horse is a granite sculpture of a horse's skull on a pedestal by James Acord, installed on the Southwestern University campus in Georgetown, Texas, United States. It was donated by the university by alumnus Joey King, who purchased the artwork from the sculptor in 2000.

== See also ==
- Madonna and Child (Umlauf), another artwork installed at Southwestern University
