= James McCloughan =

U.S. Army soldier

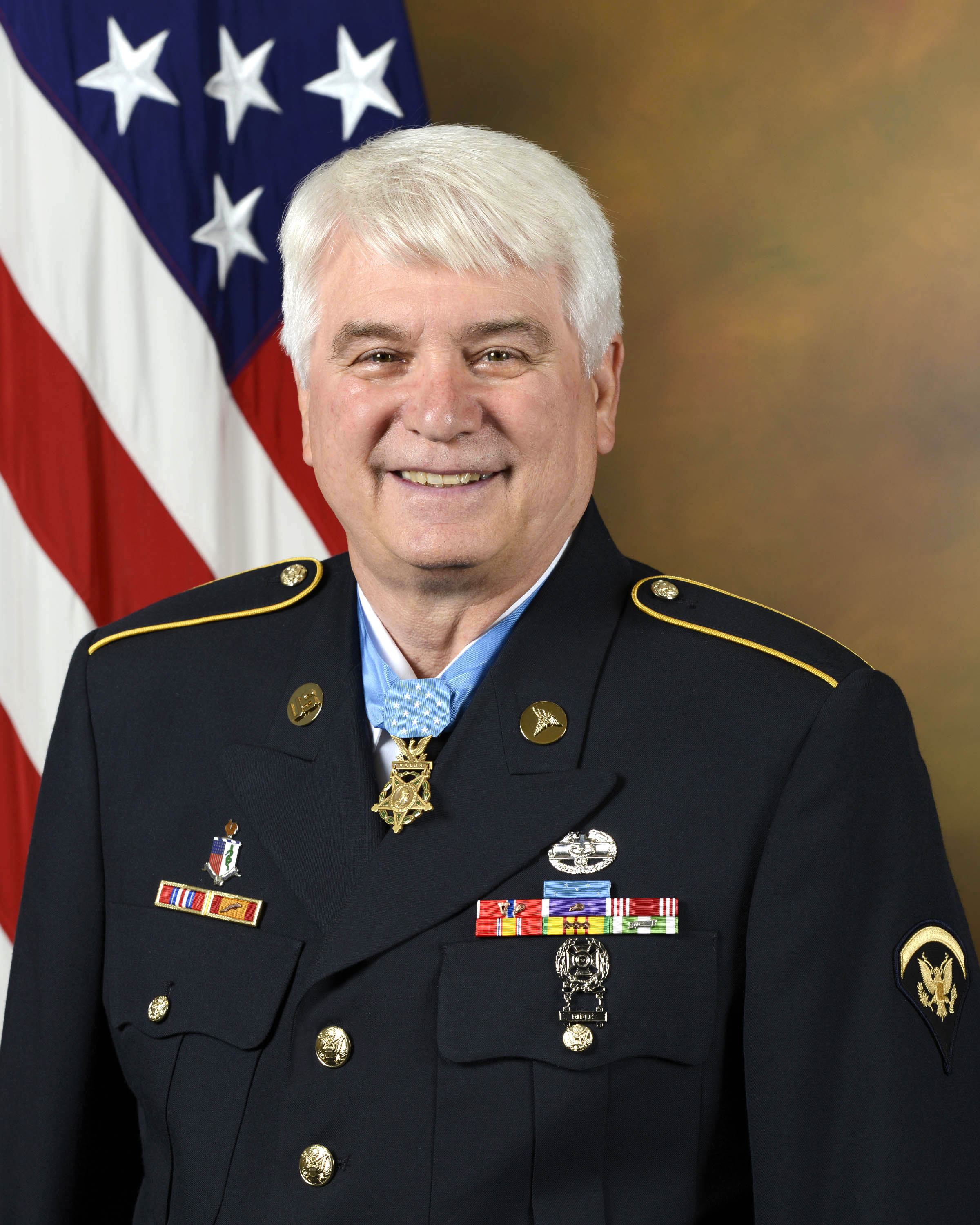
- Official photo of McCloughan in July 2017
- Born: April 30, 1946 (age 80); South Haven, Michigan
- Military career
- Allegiance: United States
- Branch: United States Army
- Service years: 1968–1970
- Rank: Specialist 5
- Units: C Company, 3rd Battalion, 21st Infantry Regiment
- Conflicts: Vietnam War
- Awards: Medal of Honor; Bronze Star Medal w/V (2); Purple Heart (2)
- Other work: High school teacher and athletics coach

James C. McCloughan (born April 30, 1946) is a former United States Army soldier and a Vietnam War veteran. For his actions during the war, McCloughan was approved for the Medal of Honor by President Barack Obama and Secretary of the Army Eric Fanning in December 2016. McCloughan was presented the Medal of Honor on 31 July 2017 by President Donald Trump, the first such award of Trump's administration.

After being drafted into the United States Army in 1968, McCloughan became a combat medic, and in May 1969 distinguished himself in fighting near Tam Kỳ at Nui Yon Hill, in which he treated the wounded while fighting North Vietnamese and Viet Cong forces. McCloughan was wounded multiple times during the battle, but refused evacuation. After his discharge from the army, he returned to his hometown of South Haven, Michigan, where he became a high school teacher and athletics coach.

== Early life ==
McCloughan was born in South Haven, Michigan, on 30 April 1946. He spent his childhood in nearby Bangor, Michigan, after his parents moved there to manage a family farm. At Bangor High School, he became a four-sport varsity athlete and continued his education at Olivet College, where he wrestled and played football and baseball. McCloughan graduated in 1968 with a Bachelor of Arts degree in sociology and a teaching certificate, and accepted a teaching and football coaching position at South Haven High School. He was drafted into the United States Army three months later on 29 August 1968.

== Vietnam War ==
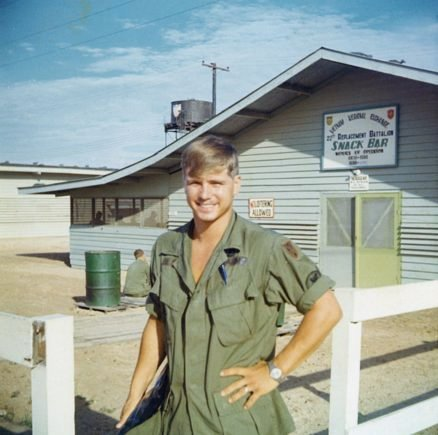
McCloughan in front of the 22nd Replacement Bn Snack Bar in 1969

In September 1968, McCloughan began basic training at Fort Knox, Kentucky. As a result of training in athletics and coaching, he had a basic understanding of sports medicine, and thus was sent to Fort Sam Houston after two months of basic training for advanced medical specialist training. He received deployment orders for Vietnam on the last day of training, and was assigned to Company C of the 3rd Battalion, 21st Infantry as a combat medic with the rank of private first class, beginning his yearlong combat tour in March 1969. The battalion was part of the Americal Division's 196th Light Infantry Brigade.

=== Medal of Honor action ===
On 13 May, McCloughan's company air assaulted into a landing zone near Tam Kỳ and Nui Yon Hill, coming under small arms and machine gun fire from defending North Vietnamese Army (NVA) forces. Two helicopters were downed over the landing zone, one of which crashed around 100 meters (110 yards) from Company C's positions. A rescue helicopter was prevented from landing due to fierce enemy fire, and a squad was sent out to rescue the pilot and crew. Upon reaching the crash site, they saw a badly wounded soldier sprawled on the ground, and McCloughan ran 100 meters (110 yards) to him through an open field, dodging the fire of his unit and a charging NVA platoon. After reaching the wounded soldier, McCloughan carried him over his shoulder and ran back to Company C, thus saving the man from capture or death.

Later that afternoon, the company's 2nd Platoon was ambushed by a large NVA unit, suffering heavy casualties, while conducting reconnaissance near Nui Yon Hill. As airstrikes were attacking nearby NVA, McCloughan entered a trench and saw two unarmed American soldiers huddling near a bush. He handed his gun to another soldier, jumped over the trench's berm, and ran close to the ground towards the two soldiers, whom he pulled back into the trench despite being hit with shrapnel from the explosion of a rocket-propelled grenade (RPG). Ignoring an order to remain in the trench, he rescued wounded soldiers from the kill zone four more times during a NVA assault. Bleeding heavily, McCloughan treated the wounded and prepared them for evacuation, refusing evacuation even though the NVA heavily outnumbered the American troops.

On 14 May, the 1st Platoon was ambushed while advancing on Nui Yon Hill, and its medic Daniel J. Shea, was killed in the fighting, which left McCloughan as the company's sole medic. While treating two soldiers in an open rice paddy, he was wounded a second time by small arms fire and RPG shrapnel. In the closing phases of the attack, two NVA companies and 700 VC attacked the company's position from three sides. With complete disregard for his own safety, he braved enemy fire numerous times to bring out wounded soldiers, simultaneously fighting the enemy. After supplies ran low, McCloughan volunteered to hold a blinking light in an exposed position to mark a location for a night resupply drop, remaining steadfast in the enemy fire.

In the predawn darkness of 15 May, McCloughan used a grenade to disable the enemy RPG position, and continued to fight and eliminate enemy soldiers, while treating multiple casualties. During the night, he kept two critically wounded soldiers alive before organizing the dead and wounded for daylight evacuation. McCloughan was credited with saving the lives of ten soldiers from his company during the actions of 13–15 May. He received two Purple Hearts for his two wounds.

For his actions between 13 and 15 May 1969, McCloughan was recommended for the Distinguished Service Cross, but the award was downgraded to the Bronze Star Medal with "V" device, which he received on 10 February 1970. Shortly afterwards, in March, he left Vietnam after his tour of duty ended. Later that year, he was discharged from the army with the rank of specialist 5.

== Civilian career ==
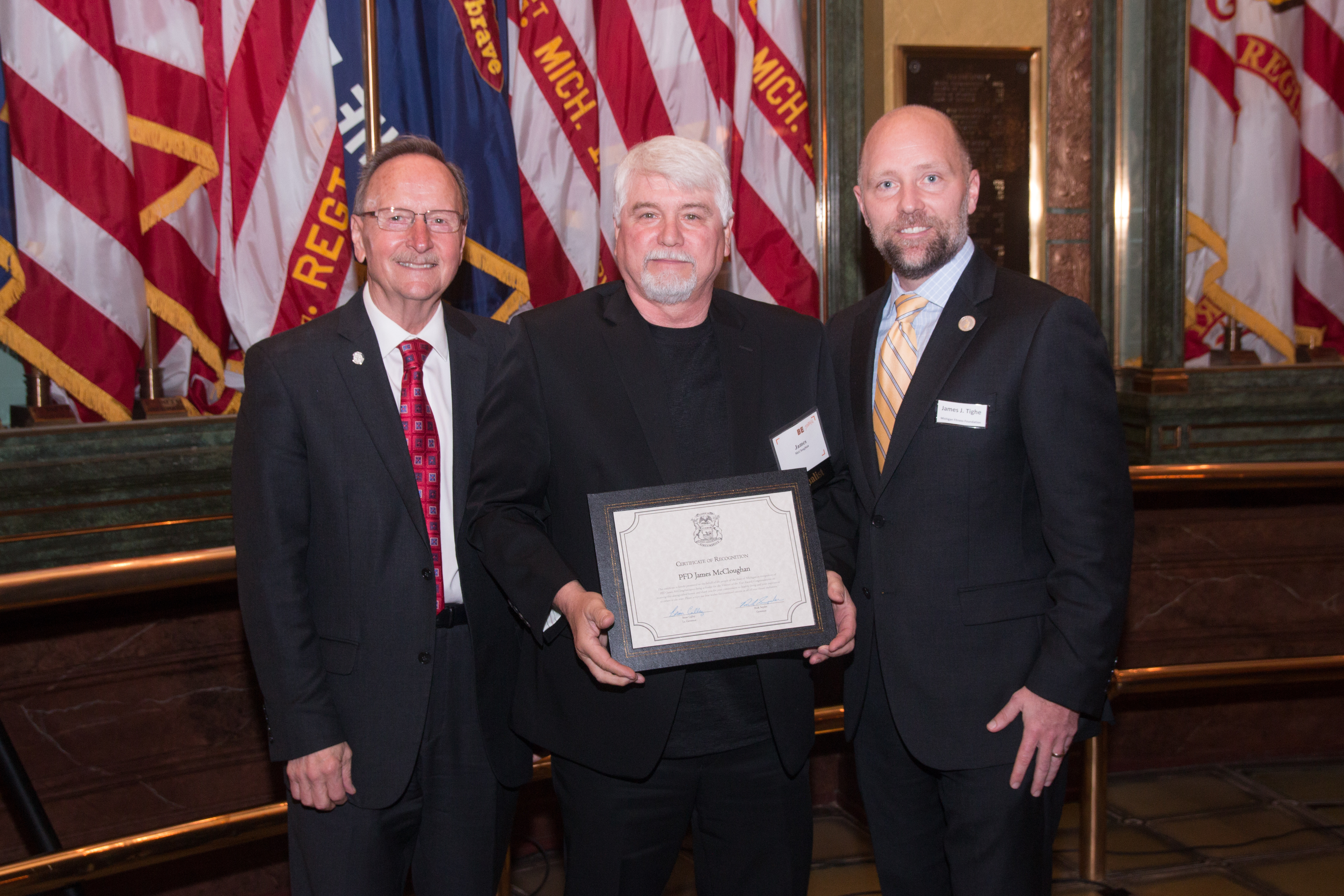
McCloughan (center) being recognized for his civilian work in sports coaching during the 2017 Michigan Governor's Fitness Awards legislative gala

After returning from Vietnam, McCloughan was re-accepted to his job at South Haven High School. In 1972, he received a Master of Arts degree in counseling and psychology from Western Michigan University. He taught psychology at South Haven until his 2008 retirement, which earned him the Michigan Education Association's 40 years of service award. He coached wrestling for 22 years, and football and baseball for 38 years. McCloughan was awarded the Wolverine Conference Distinguished Service Award for his coaching, and was inducted into the Michigan High School Baseball Coaches Association Hall of Fame in 1993, the Michigan High School Coaches Hall of Fame in 2003 and the Michigan High School Football Coaches Association Hall of Fame in 2008. He also spent 25 years as a Michigan High School Athletic Association wrestling official.

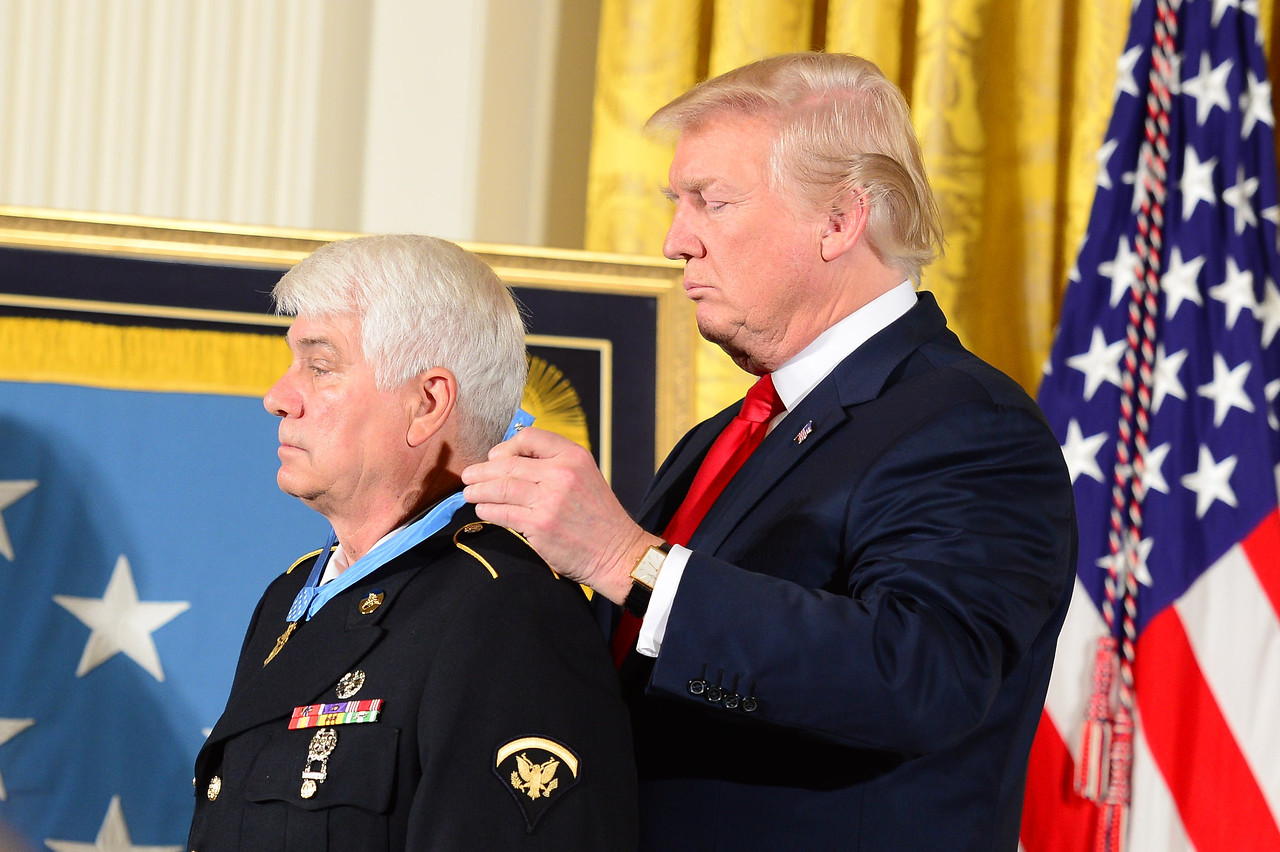
McCloughan receiving the Medal of Honor from President Donald Trump on 31 July 2017

In 2009, McCloughan's former platoon leader revived his Distinguished Service Cross nomination with the assistance of United States Senator Carl Levin of Michigan. Upon Senator Levin's retirement in 2015, additional assistance was provided by Michigan's United States Senator Debbie Stabenow. Then-Secretary of Defense Ash Carter recommended that it be upgraded to the Medal of Honor, America's highest military honor, in 2016. On 23 December 2016, then-President Barack Obama signed the National Defense Authorization Act for Fiscal Year 2017, which included legislation allowing for a waiver to the five-year time limit on Medal of Honor awards. Then-Secretary of the Army Eric Fanning signed his Medal of Honor certificate on 27 December 2016, and on 13 June 2017, the White House announced that McCloughan would receive his award from President Donald Trump on 31 July. He was inducted into the Pentagon's Hall of Heroes on 1 August 2017. McCloughan received his Medal of Honor from President Trump during a White House ceremony on 31 July, which made him the first to receive a Medal of Honor during the Trump administration.

== Personal life ==
McCloughan is married to Chérie and has two sons, Jamie and Matt, a daughter, Kami, and a stepdaughter, Kara.

In October 2024, McCloughan joined 15 other Medal of Honor recipients in publicly endorsing Donald Trump for president.

== Awards and decorations ==
During his service, McCloughan earned the following military decorations and service medals, including:

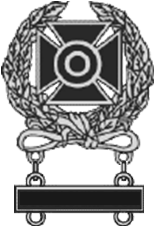

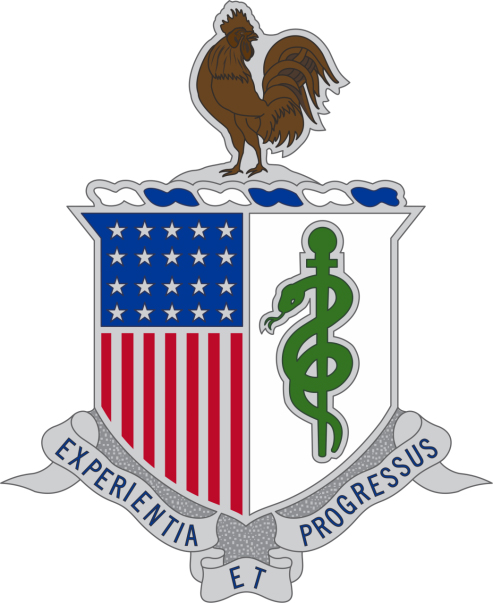

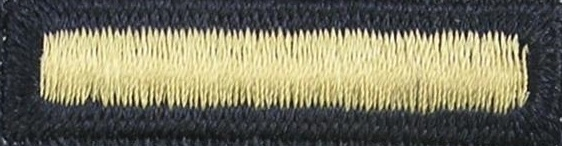
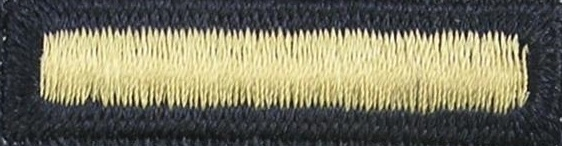

Badge	Combat Medical Badge		
1st row	Medal of Honor		
2nd row	Bronze Star Medal w/ Combat "V" and oak leaf cluster	Purple Heart w/ oak leaf cluster	Good Conduct Medal
3rd row	National Defense Service Medal	Vietnam Service Medal w/ three 3/16" bronze stars	Vietnam Campaign Medal w/ "60" device
Badge	Expert Badge w/ rifle clasp		
Badge	Army Medical Department Distinctive Unit Insignia		
Unit awards	Valorous Unit Award		Republic of Vietnam Gallantry Cross Unit Citation
Service bars	2 Overseas Service Bars		

== Medal of Honor citation ==
McCloughan's Medal of Honor citation reads:

Private First Class McCloughan distinguished himself by acts of gallantry and intrepidity at the risk of his life above and beyond the call of duty from May 13th through 15th, 1969, while serving as a combat medic with Charlie Company, 3rd Battalion, 21st Infantry, 196th Light Infantry Brigade, Americal Division. The company air assaulted into an area near Tam Ky and Nui Yon Hill. On May 13th, with complete disregard for his life, he ran 100 meters in an open field through heavy fire to rescue a comrade too injured to move and carried him to safety. That same day, 2nd Platoon was ordered to search the area near Nui Yon Hill when the platoon was ambushed by a large North Vietnamese Army force and sustained heavy casualties. With complete disregard for his life and personal safety, Private First Class McCloughan led two Americans into the safety of a trench while being wounded by shrapnel from a rocket-propelled grenade. He ignored a direct order to stay back, and braved an enemy assault while moving into the "kill zone" on four more occasions to extract wounded comrades. He treated the injured, prepared the evacuation, and though bleeding heavily from shrapnel wounds on his head and entire body, refused evacuation to safety in order to remain at the battle site with his fellow soldiers who were heavily outnumbered by the North Vietnamese Army forces. On May 14th, the platoon was again ordered to move out towards Nui Yon Hill. Private First Class McCloughan was wounded a second time by small arms fire and shrapnel from a rocket-propelled grenade while rendering aid to two soldiers in an open rice paddy. In the final phases of the attack, two companies from 2nd North Vietnamese Army Division and an element of 700 soldiers from a Viet Cong regiment descended upon Charlie Company's position on three sides. Private First Class McCloughan, again with complete disregard for his life, went into the crossfire numerous times throughout the battle to extract the wounded soldiers, while also fighting the enemy. His relentless and courageous actions inspired and motivated his comrades to fight for their survival. When supplies ran low, Private First Class McCloughan volunteered to hold a blinking strobe light in an open area as a marker for a nighttime resupply drop. He remained steadfast while bullets landed all around him and rocket-propelled grenades flew over his prone, exposed body. During the morning darkness of May 15th, Private First Class McCloughan knocked out a rocket-propelled grenade position with a grenade, fought and eliminated enemy soldiers, treated numerous casualties, kept two critically-wounded soldiers alive through the night, and organized the dead and wounded for evacuation at daylight. His timely and courageous actions were instrumental in saving the lives of his fellow soldiers. Private First Class McCloughan's personal heroism, professional competence, and devotion to duty are in keeping with the highest traditions of the military service and reflect great credit upon himself, the Americal Division, and the United States Army.
