= Black River (Southwest Michigan) =

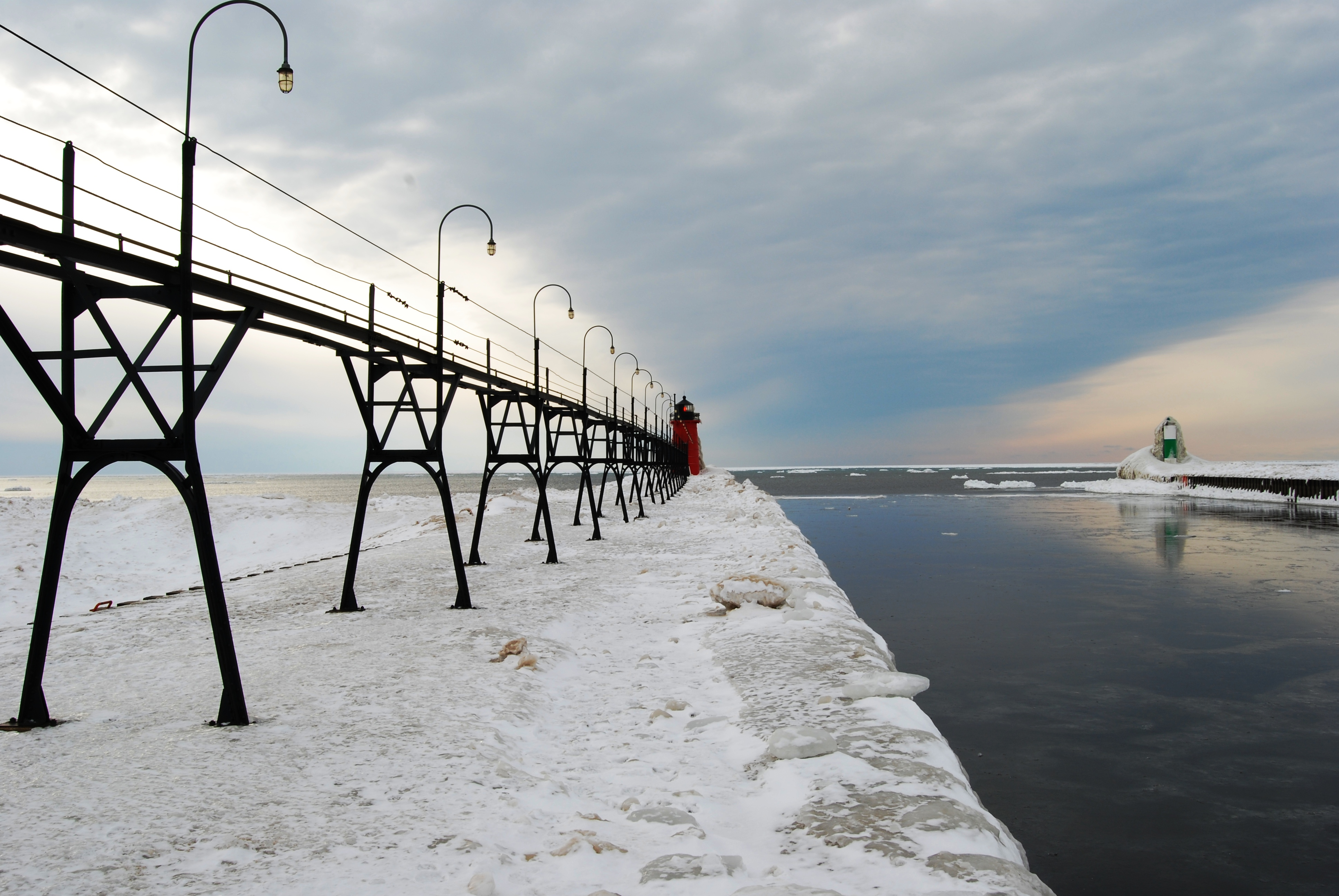
- Black River flowing into Lake Michigan

Location
- Country: United States

Physical characteristics
- Mouth
  - location: Lake Michigan at South Haven, Michigan
  - elevation: 581 ft (177 m)

Black River is a 4.2-mile-long (6.8 km) river in the southwest part of the U.S. state of Michigan that empties into Lake Michigan in South Haven at 42°24′08″N 86°17′04″W, where it discharges past the South Pier Lighthouse. The river takes its name from the dark brown color of its water, which is caused by suspended sediments and organic materials picked up along its course. The river supports a variety of wildlife including trout, snapping turtles, leeches, and many other varieties of flora and fauna. The Black River watershed encompasses 287 square miles (740 km^{2}) across two counties and 13 townships.

The main course of the river is formed by the confluence of the North Branch Black River and Middle Branch Black River at 42°25′57″N 86°14′00″W, northwest of South Haven. The South Branch Black River joins the main course at 42°25′04″N 86°15′01″W.

The North Branch Black River is formed out of the Black River Drain, which rises out of a complex of drains including the Leverich Drain and North State Road Drain in Clyde Township and Ganges Township in Allegan County. The Middle Branch Black River is formed by the junction of the Little Bear Lake Drain and Melvin Creek at 42°25′04″N 86°15′01″W in southern Lee Township, near the boundary with Van Buren County. The South Branch Black River is formed by the junction of the Lower Jeptha Lake Drain and the Black River Extension Drain at 42°20′10″N 86°02′19″W in Columbia Township near Breedsville.

About three miles above its mouth on Lake Michigan, the river forks, with the South Branch draining Van Buren County. Less than three miles further upstream, the river forks again into the Middle and North Branches. The Middle branch drains areas of both Van Buren and Allegan counties, and the North Branch watershed is entirely in Allegan County.

== Tributaries ==
From the mouth:

- (right) South Branch Black River
  - (left) Butternut Creek
    - (left) Tripp and Extension Drain
  - (right) Cedar Creek
  - (left) Eastman Creek
    - (left) Picture Lake
    - (right) Moon Lake
  - (right) Merriman Lake
    - School Section Lake
  - Maple Creek
    - (left) Cedar Drain
    - (right) Nelson Extension Drain
  - Great Bear Lake Drain
    - Great Bear Lake
      - Haven and Max Lake Drain
      - Max Lake
        - Mill Lake
        - Munn Lake
  - (left) Lower Jeptha Lake Drain
    - Lower Jeptha Lake
      - Upper Jeptha Lake
  - (right) Black River Extension Drain
    - (left) South Scott Lake
      - (right) Abernathy Lake
        - (left) Max Lake
      - (left) North Scott Lake
- Middle Branch Black River
  - (right) Spicebush Creek
  - (left) Scott Creek Drain, also known as Scott Creek
    - (left) Elm Creek Drain, also known as Elm Creek
    - Lower Scott Lake
      - Upper Scott Lake
  - Barber Creek, also spelled Barbor Creek
    - (right) Lester Lake
      - (right) Mud Lake
    - (right) Coffee Lake
    - Saddle Lake
  - Spring Brook
    - Spring Brook Lake
  - (left) Osterhout Lake
  - (left) Melvin Creek
    - Deer Lake
      - Lake Moriah
        - (left) Mud Lake
  - (right) Little Bear Lake Drain
    - (left) Lake Eleven
    - Lake Fourteen
- North Branch Black River
  - Black River Drain
    - (right) Ockford Drain
    - (left) Beaver Dam Drain
    - (left) North State Road Drain
      - Hutchins Lake
    - Leverich Drain
