= Hospify =

Secure messaging application

Hospify is secure clinical messaging software similar to WhatsApp. The company is based in Lancashire.

The software was created by James Flint, Neville Dastur and Charles Nduka in 2014. Dastur and Nduka are surgeons. The paid version is called Hospify Hub. and was tested at Royal Stoke University Hospital. It can be used for broadcast messaging and is approved for the NHS Apps Library. It took more than a year to pass through “rigorous” testing and assessment processes.

Unlike WhatsApp, all data is stored in the user's phone. Transit messages are deleted after 72 hours and data is deleted from the phones after 30 days. It does not show sensitive message content on the phone’s home screen or share photos with the in-phone gallery. It is hoped that it will stop staff sharing sensitive clinical information using consumer services such as WhatsApp.

London North West University Healthcare NHS Trust installed the software to help staff communicate with each other and with patients more effectively during the COVID-19 pandemic in England. Staff can take part in one-to-one and group messaging and exchange unlimited text and photo messages. There is a built-in passcode. Phone numbers and email addresses are masked. Data is not harvested for marketing or advertising. By May 2020 it had spread to more than 150 clinical sites.

It was closed down on January 31 2022 after the Government suspended relevant terms of the UK 2018 Data Protection Act so professionals could freely use non-compliant consumer messaging platforms to communicate without fear of disapproval. The company said it planned to “explore new markets in the EU and other regions in which health data protection is taken more seriously by governments and properly enforced by their respective regulators”.
