= James Acord =

American artist (1944–2011)

- James L. Acord in front of the Fast Flux Test Facility, Hanford Site, Washington, United States.
- Born: October 19, 1944
- Died: January 9, 2011 (aged 66)
- Occupation: Artist

James Leroy Acord (19 October 1944 – 9 January 2011) was an artist who worked directly with radioactive materials.

== Background ==
He attempted to create sculpture and events that probed the history of nuclear engineering and asked questions about the long-term storage of nuclear waste. For 15 years he lived in Richland, Washington, the dormitory town for the Hanford Nuclear Reservation, at one time home to nine nuclear reactors and five plutonium-processing complexes and the most contaminated nuclear site in the United States. His major ambition while there was to build a "nuclear Stonehenge" on a heavily contaminated area of land in the site, incorporating twelve uranium breeder-blanket assemblies.

Acord was the only private individual in the world licensed to own and handle radioactive materials, and acquired nuclear fuel rods containing depleted uranium from the completed but not operated German SNR-300 breeder reactor to use as artistic materials. He had his nuclear license number tattooed onto his neck. He spoke on art and nuclear science at both art and nuclear industry events in the US and the UK and organised many forums that brought together artists, activists and nuclear industry experts.

He was profiled by Philip Schuyler for The New Yorker in 1991, and was the inspiration for the character of Reever in The Book of Ash by James Flint. The extensive audio interviews Flint did with Acord in Alaska in 1998 as part of his research for the novel have now been archived and catalogued by the British Library.

From 1998 to 1999 he was Artist in Residence at Imperial College London, a residency set up by arts commissioning organisation The Arts Catalyst, and funded by Arts Council England and the Calouste Gulbenkian Foundation.

He committed suicide in Seattle on January 9, 2011 at the age of 66.

His sculpture, Monstrance for a Grey Horse, is installed on the Southwestern University campus in Georgetown, Texas.

== See also ==
- Robert Del Tredici
