= The Torchbearers =

Sculpture in Austin, Texas, U.S.

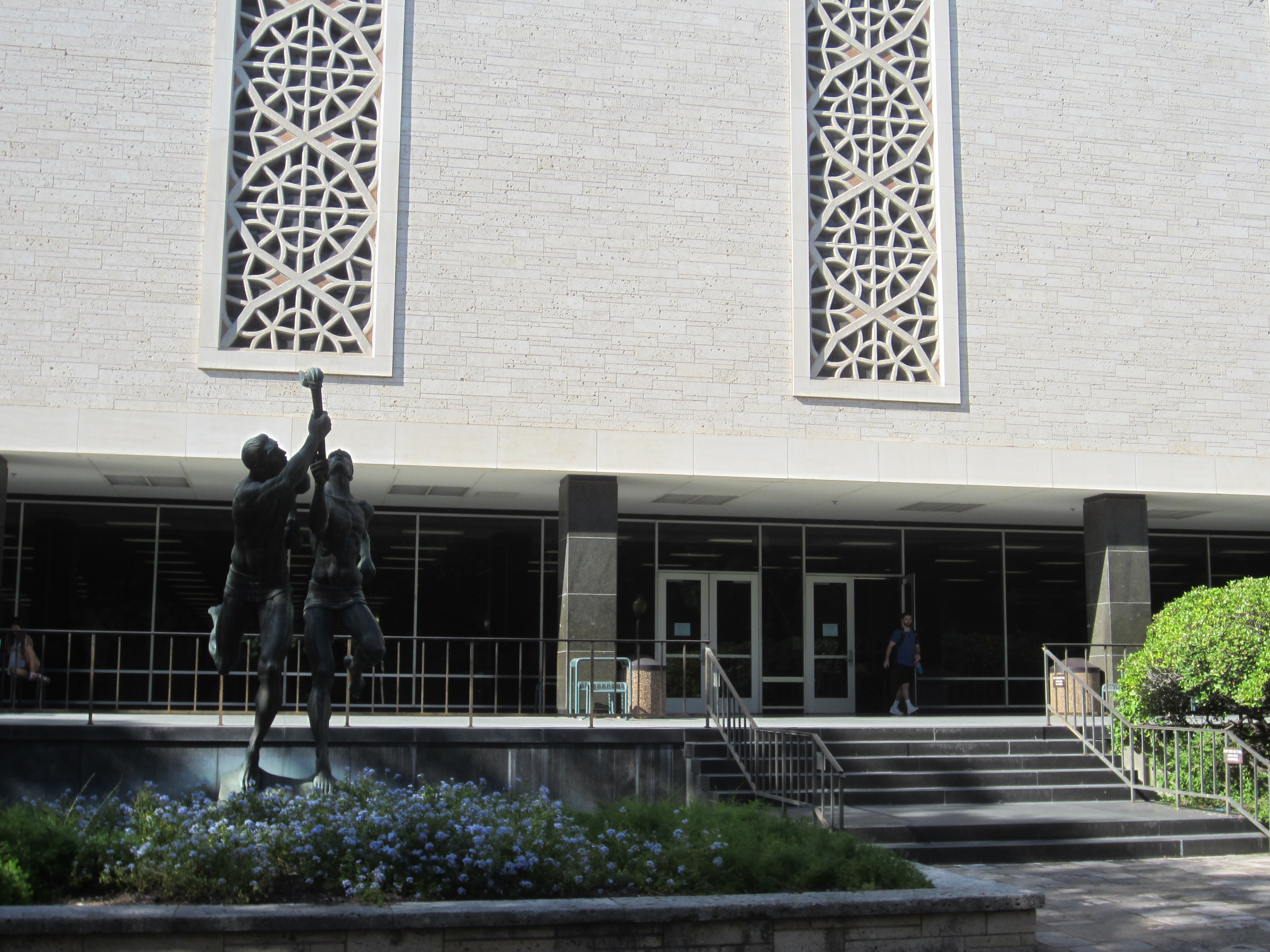
- The sculpture in 2018
- Artist: Charles Umlauf
- Year: 1962
- Type: Sculpture
- Medium: Bronze
- Location: Austin, Texas, United States; 30°17′9.4″N 97°44′25.3″W

The Torchbearers is a 1962 bronze sculpture by Charles Umlauf, installed outside the Flawn Academic Center on the University of Texas at Austin campus in Austin, Texas, United States. It was cast in Milan at the Fonderia Battaglia.

== See also ==
- 1962 in art
