= Umlauf Sculpture Garden and Museum =

Coordinates: 30°15′48″N 97°45′57″W

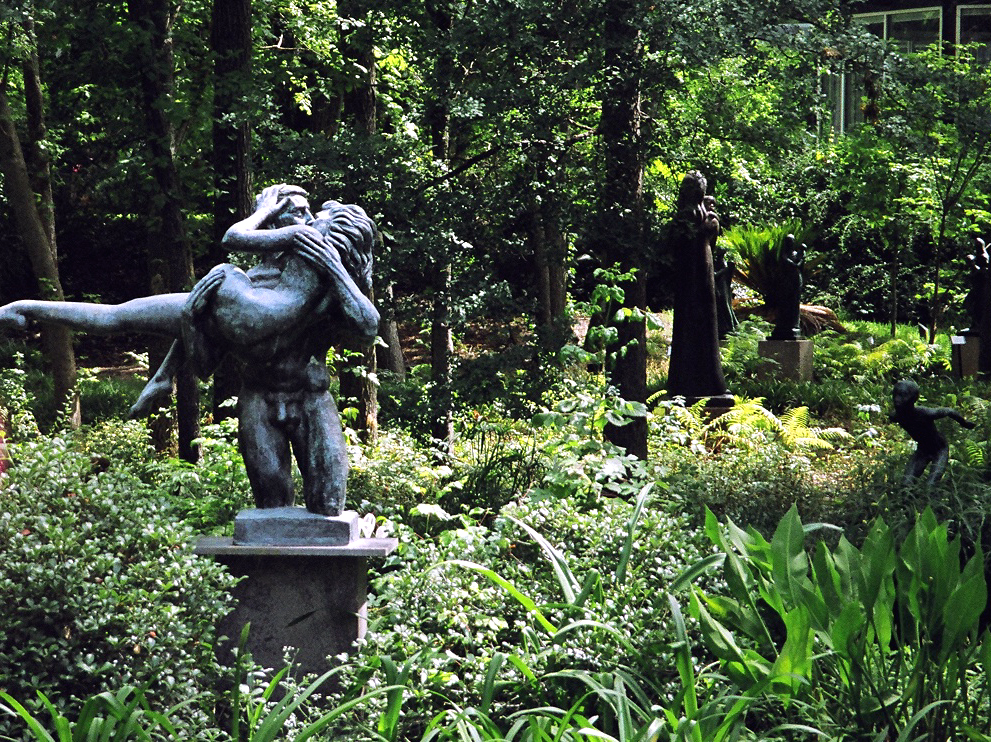
- Umlauf's The Kiss (Bronze 1970) is the centerpiece of the sculpture garden pond. Another of his bronzes, The Diver (1956, on far right), stands at the water's edge.
- Established: 1985
- Location: 605 Azie Morton Road; Austin, Texas
- Type: Art museum
- Collections: Sculpture
- Director: Katie Robinson Edwards
- Public transit access: Rt. 30 (Barton Springs/Azie Morton)
- Website: www.umlaufsculpture.org

The Umlauf Sculpture Garden & Museum, stylized as the UMLAUF, is a museum and outdoor sculpture garden centered on the artistic works of American sculptor Charles Umlauf. Located at 605 Azie Morton Road in the Zilker neighborhood of Austin, Texas, the garden is adjacent to Austin's Zilker Park.

In 1985, Charles and Angeline Umlauf donated their home, studio, and 168 Umlauf sculptures to the City of Austin. Six years later, in 1991, the City built a museum to display the artwork on adjoining city property with private funds. Staff and volunteers maintain the museum with support of grants, donated funds, and contributions from the City of Austin, to maintain the museum and xeriscaped garden. The Museum maintains a seasonal schedule including exhibitions of Charles Umlauf and his twentieth century peers and contemporary art exhibitions.

== Charles Umlauf ==
Charles Umlauf was a notable American sculptor who taught as a professor in the University of Texas at Austin Art Department for 40 years. He began sculpting at a young age and began taking classes at the Art Institute of Chicago at age 11. Umlauf was employed by the Works Progress Administration Federal Art Project during the Great Depression and he garnered recognition for his large public work sculptures, including War Mother (1939) which resulted in his job offer from the University of Texas. He is known for his expressive sculptures regarding humanistic and religious themes, and his use of various materials including rose quartz and Brazilian rosewood. In Texas, Umlauf has more sculptures on display in public locations than any other single sculptor.

== Contemporary Art Exhibitions ==
The UMLAUF has a gallery space which seasonally exhibits contemporary artists from around the world but with a focus on Texan and Southern artists. Past exhibits have included work by artists: James Surls, Farrah Fawcett (student, mentee, and occasional muse of Umlauf), Jesús Moroles, Luis Jimenez, and Michael Ray Charles.

== UMLAUF Prize Expanded ==
The Umlauf offers an annual prize to an emerging artist based in Austin. The award provides a stipend and a solo exhibition at the museum.

== See also ==
- List of single-artist museums
- List of botanical gardens in the United States
- Madonna and Child (Umlauf)
