= Nate Barnes =

American singer-songwriter

- Born: South Haven, Michigan, U.S.
- Origin: Nashville, Tennessee, U.S.
- Genres: Country
- Occupation: Singer-songwriter
- Instruments: Vocals, guitar
- Years active: 2021–present
- Label: Quartz Hill

Nate Barnes is an American country music singer and songwriter.

== Early life ==
Barnes was born as Nathan Mielke in South Haven, Michigan. Growing up, he worked at a blueberry farm and a nuclear power plant.

== Musical career ==
In 2020, Barnes took a vacation in Nashville, Tennessee where a friend introduced him to songwriter Jason Sellers and record label executive Benny Brown, who was formerly the president of BBR Music Group. After Barnes played songs for the two of them, Brown signed him to Quartz Hill Records, a record label that he had just founded. Barnes then wrote his first single, "You Ain't Pretty", with Sellers and Jimmy Yeary. The song was then released on TikTok, where it went on to gain over 12 million views after its 2021 release. Following this, he began working on his debut album with producers Mickey Jack Cones and Derek George. In addition to its release to radio, the song was made into a music video, which has aired on CMT.

By October 2021, "You Ain't Pretty" had reached number 47 on the Billboard Country Airplay charts.

== Discography ==
=== Singles ===
Year	Title	Peak positions	Album
Year	Title	US Country Airplay	Album
2021	"You Ain't Pretty"	46	TBA
