= Liberty Hyde Bailey Birthplace =

Historic house in Michigan, United States

- U.S. National Register of Historic Places
- Michigan State Historic Site
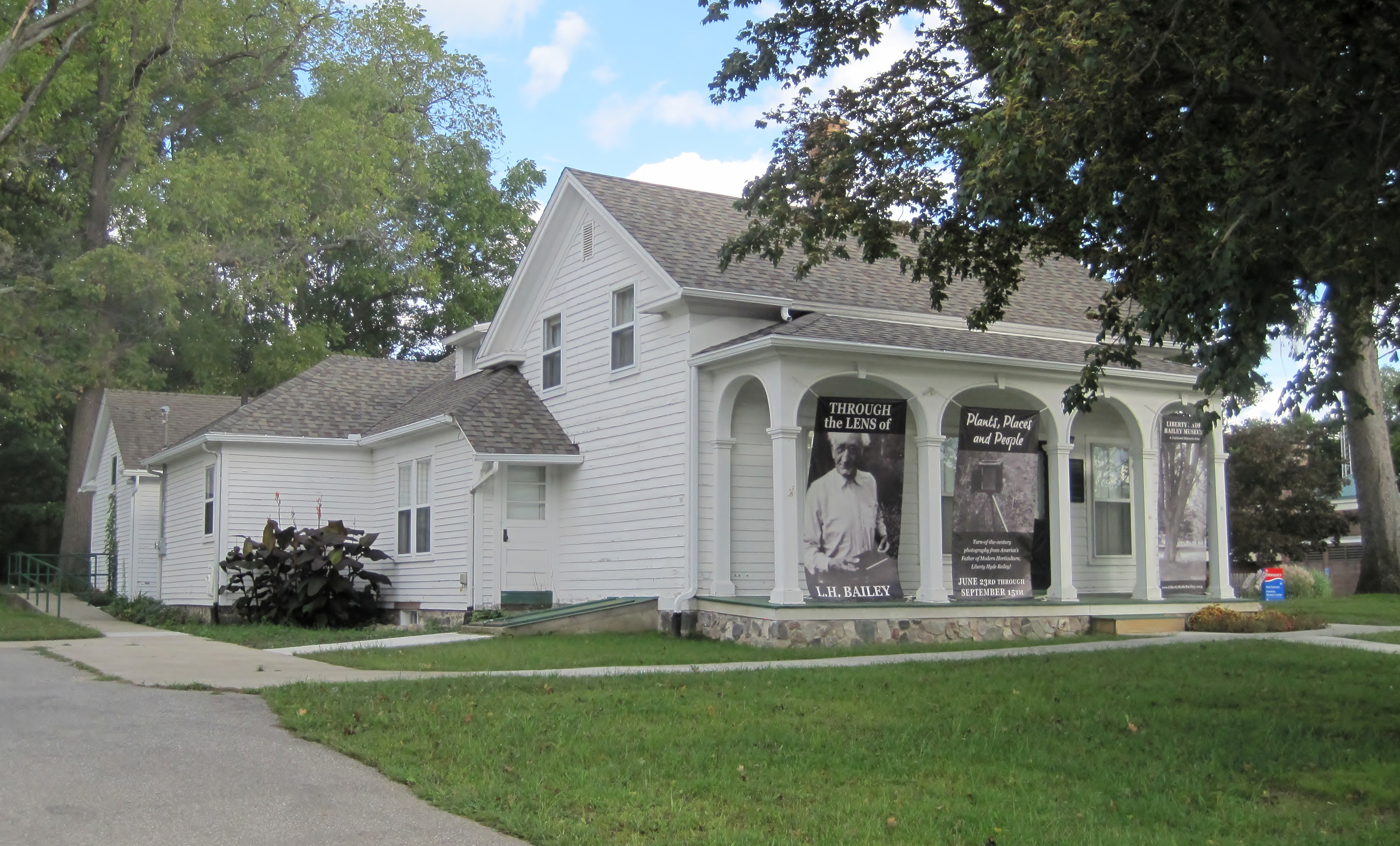

- Location within Michigan Location within the United States
- Interactive map
- Location: 903 Bailey Ave., South Haven, Michigan
- Coordinates: 42°23′31″N 86°15′50″W
- Area: less than one acre
- Built: 1853
- Architectural style: Greek Revival
- NRHP reference No.: 83000892

Significant dates
- Added to NRHP: April 18, 1983
- Designated MSHS: January 18, 1963

The Liberty Hyde Bailey Birthplace, now the Liberty Hyde Bailey Museum, is a farmhouse located at 903 Bailey Avenue in South Haven, Michigan, and is significant as the birthplace and childhood home of horticulturist Liberty Hyde Bailey. It was designated a Michigan State Historic Site in 1963 and listed on the National Register of Historic Places in 1983.

== History ==
This farmhouse was built in 1853-1858 by Liberty Hyde Bailey Sr., and stood on his 80-acre farm. In 1858, Liberty Hyde Bailey was born in this house; the younger Bailey spent 19 years living here, learning about the local wild animals and plants. He entered Michigan Agricultural College (now Michigan State University) in 1878, and went on to become a well-known horticulturist, botanist and cofounder of the American Society for Horticultural Science.

In 1918, Frank E. Warner purchased the Bailey farm, and lived there until his death in 1926. In 1937, the property which the house stands on was presented to the city of South Haven for use as a memorial to Dr. Bailey.

== Description ==
The Liberty Hyde Bailey Birthplace is a 1 1/2-story Greek Revival house clad in clapboard and sitting on a fieldstone foundation. A single-story rear section was added some time after the original construction. The interior has plaster walls and ceilings with plain board trim. The first floor contains sitting and dining rooms, a kitchen, a bedroom, and a storage room. The second floor contains three bedrooms and a small library.
