= James Flint (novelist) =

British novelist and journalist

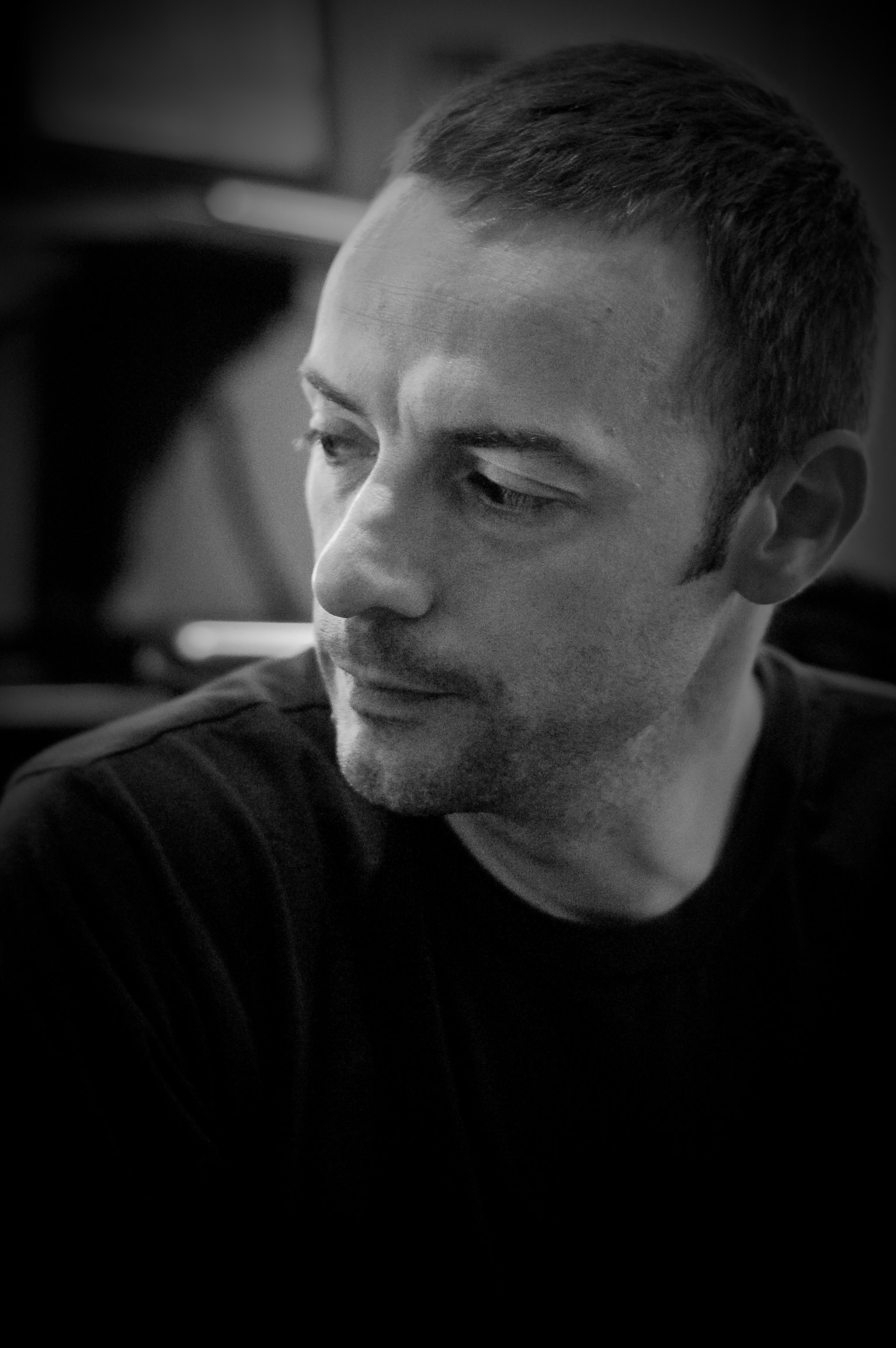
- Flint in 2010
- Born: 1968 (age 57–58); Stratford-upon-Avon
- Occupations: Novelist, journalist

James Flint (born 1968) is a British novelist and journalist. Born in Stratford-upon-Avon in 1968, he did a journalistic apprenticeship on the Times of India in New Delhi before studying philosophy and psychology at Wadham College, Oxford. On graduating he spent a year in New York City studying jazz theory and technique, returning to the UK to take an MA in Philosophy and Literature at the University of Warwick. After graduating, he worked at The Independent newspaper in London, before becoming a contributing editor of the Mute magazine and a section editor of Wired UK.

Flint is the author of the novels Habitus, 52 Ways to Magic America, which won the Amazon.co.uk Bursary Award for the year 2000; and The Book of Ash, which was inspired by the life of the nuclear artist James Acord and won the 2003 Arts Council Writers’ Award. He has also published a short story collection Soft Apocalypse – Twelve Tales from the Turn of the Millennium (2004: Au Diable Vauvert). His short fiction has appeared in collections published by Penguin Books, the New English Library and the ICA. When it was published in France in 2002, Habitus was judged as in the top five foreign novels of that year's Rentrée Littéraire. (Note: “Rentrée Littéraire” is translated as “Literary Return” in English.)

In 2002, one of Flint's stories (The Nuclear Train) was filmed for Channel 4 by the director Dan Saul. Flint also scripted the film installation Little Earth and co-wrote 'Like an Octogenarian' with Sebastian Doggart for A&E Network's 2006 show 15 Films About Madonna. Between 2004 and 2007 he ran the Film Tent at the Port Eliot Festival, which featured films and talks from filmmakers including Mike Figgis and Kevin Allen.

In December 2006, Flint took a full-time position as the digital Arts and Features editor at the Telegraph Media Group. In 2007 he oversaw the set up and launch of Telegraph Earth and was subsequently promoted to be the editorial head of digital development. After spending a year as General Manager of Telegraph TV, he was appointed editor of the weekly world edition of the Telegraph newspaper and its sister website telegraph.co.uk/expat.

As of July 2021, he is currently the co-founder and CEO of the health communications start-up Hospify.

== Published work ==
- Habitus, James Flint (UK, Fourth Estate, 1998, ISBN 1-85702-824-4)
- 52 Ways to Magic America, James Flint (UK, Fourth Estate, 2002, ISBN 1-84115-523-3)
- The Book of Ash, James Flint (UK, Penguin, 2004, ISBN 0-670-91492-4)
- Douce Apocalypse: 12 récits pour le nouveau millénaire, James Flint [France, Au Diable Vauvert, 2004, VAU 0642]
- Midland, James Flint
