= Lois Perkins Chapel =

Chapel in Georgetown, Texas, U.S.

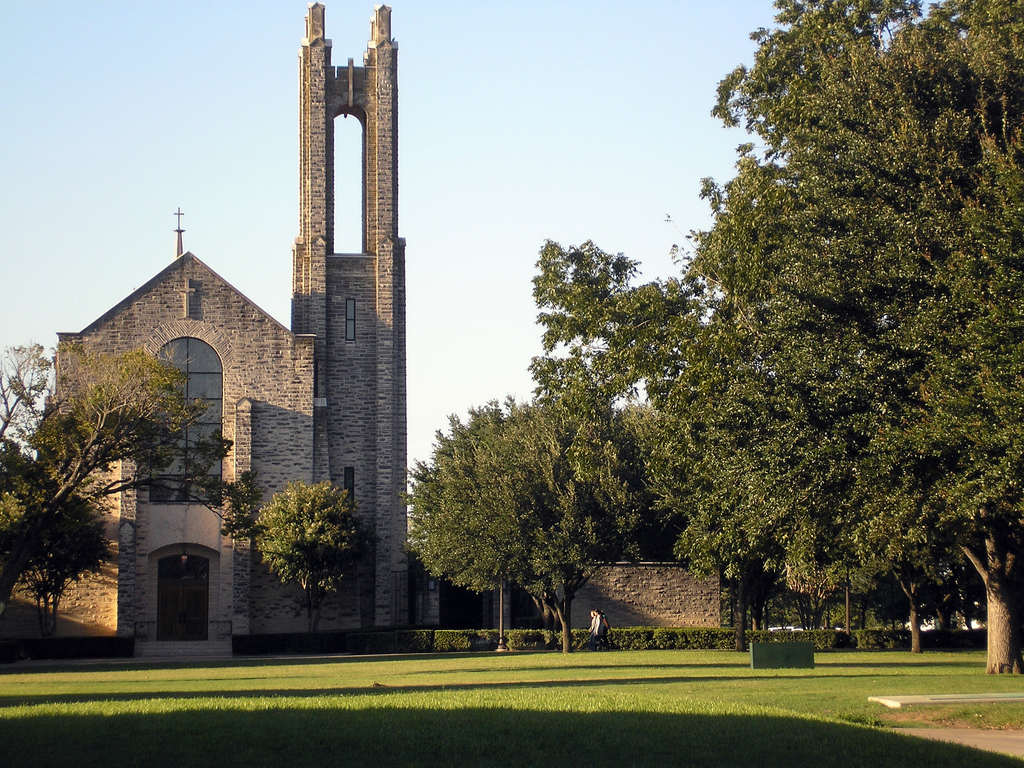
- Lois Perkins Chapel
- 30.6358°N 97.6652°W
- Location: Georgetown, Texas
- Country: U.S.
- Denomination: Christianity

Architecture
- Completed: 1950

Lois Perkins Chapel is a chapel on the Southwestern University campus in Georgetown, Texas, United States. Built in 1950, the chapel is named after alumna Lois Perkins.
