= South Haven, Michigan =

- City
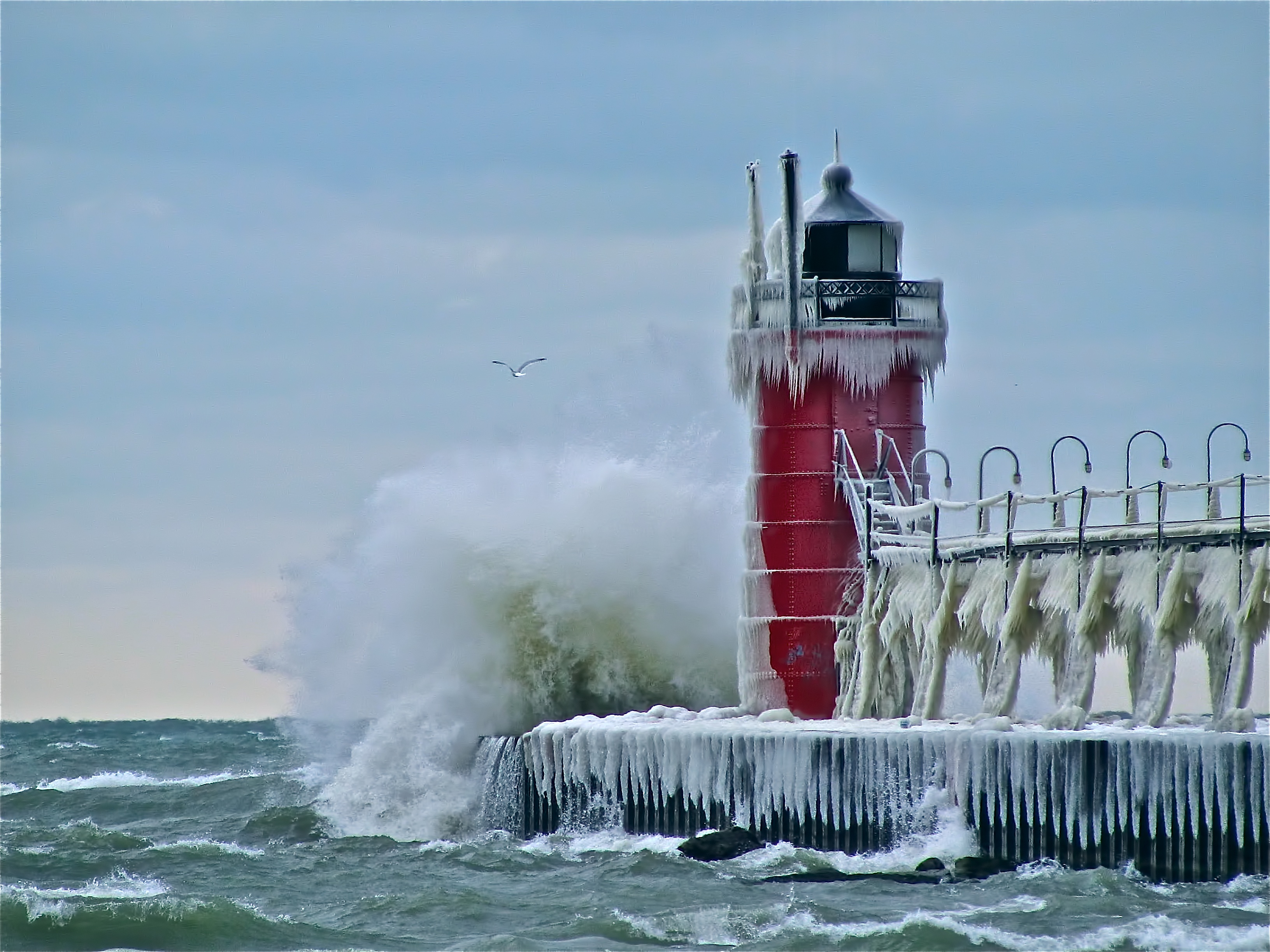
- South Haven Lighthouse, seen in winter

- Logo

- Location in Van Buren County & Allegan County in the state of Michigan
- Coordinates: 42°24′11″N 86°16′25″W
- Country: United States
- State: Michigan
- Counties: Van Buren, Allegan

Government
  - Mayor: Annie Brown

Area
  - Total: 3.49 sq mi (9.05 km^{2})
  - Land: 3.41 sq mi (8.82 km^{2})
  - Water: 0.093 sq mi (0.24 km^{2})
- Elevation: 614 ft (187 m)

Population (2020)
  - Total: 3,964
  - Density: 1,164.5/sq mi (449.61/km^{2})
- Time zone: UTC-5 (EST)
  - Summer (DST): UTC-4 (EDT)
- ZIP code: 49090
- Area code: 269
- FIPS code: 26-74980
- GNIS feature ID: 0638363
- Website: www.southhaven.org

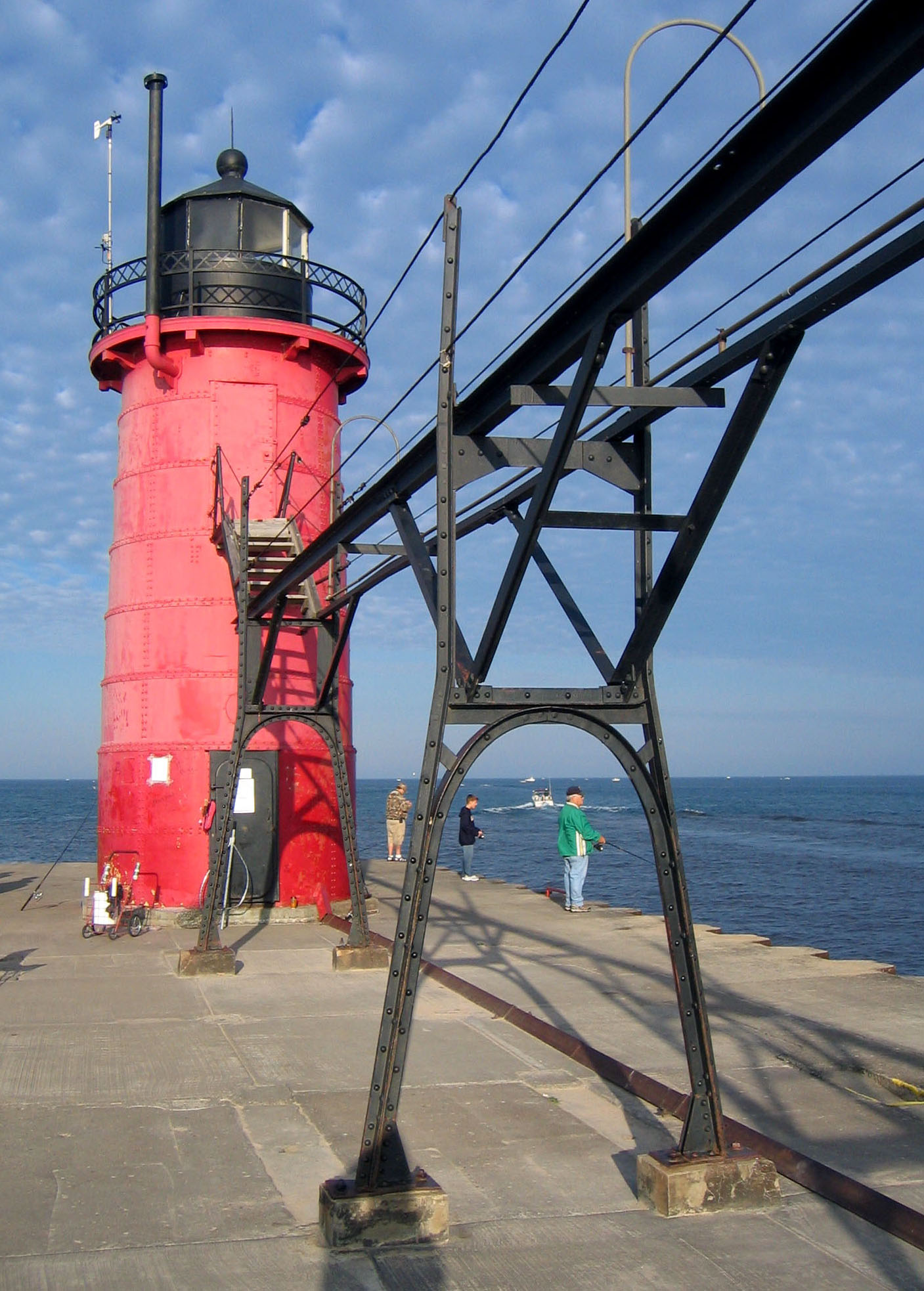
South Pier lighthouse

South Haven is a city in the U.S. state of Michigan. Most of the city is in Van Buren County, although a small portion extends into Allegan County. The population was 3,964 at the 2020 census.

Because of its position on Lake Michigan, at the mouth of the Black River, South Haven has always been a port city. During settlement, major ship lines stopped there, both passenger and freight. In the early 1900s South Haven became a resort town, sometimes referred to as "The Catskills of the Midwest." South Haven is a major regional tourist draw because of its recreational harbor and beaches. It is the western terminus of the Kal-Haven Trail, popular with bicyclists and snowmobilers. Nearby are Van Buren State Park and the Van Buren Trail State Park.

Noted botanist Liberty Hyde Bailey was born in South Haven. His childhood home was presented to the city in the 1930s, and is now a museum.

== History ==
Prior to colonization by settlers, the area was inhabited at different times by Potawatomi and Iroquois native people. In 1833, the U.S. government granted Jay R. Monroe a land patent for 65 acres of land along the shore of Lake Michigan. In the 1850s the first permanent settlers arrived, and early in the decade the first steam sawmills were built on the Black River. About this time, the settlement gained its first merchant, physician, lawyer, and minister, and the first schoolhouse was built. The first bank was organized in 1867. South Haven was incorporated as a village in 1869, and as a city in 1902. South Haven was named in relation to nearby Grand Haven.

In 1853, the first hotel in South Haven, known as the Forest House, was built at the corner of Phoenix and Center Streets. The building was subsequently moved a few doors south and still stands, though greatly modified, and no longer used as a hotel.

The timber harvested in South Haven was shipped to Chicago and Milwaukee via steamboats and schooners, and the cleared forests were then used by fruit farmers, who primarily grew peaches, blueberries and apples. The farming industry created many jobs in the area, and the city began to boom. Around the early 1900s, theaters, a casino, an opera house, an amusement park, and many resorts contributed to a rise in popularity of the city. Being a resort city resulted in a seasonal economy, however, and in an effort to stabilize the economy, the city's board of trade successfully recruited several different industries to the area.

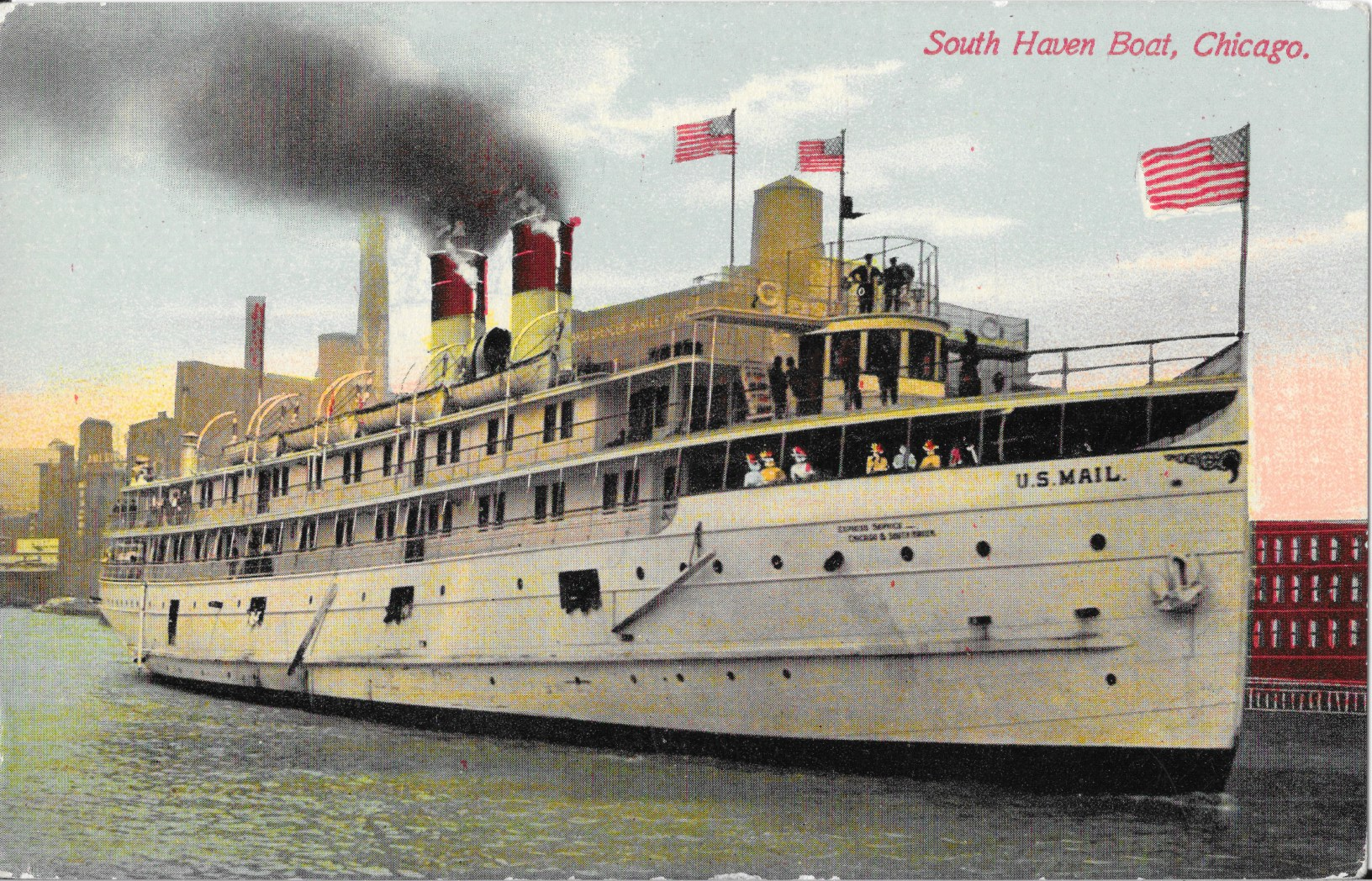
Boat from Chicago to South Haven, circa 1910

In 1925, the first foreign shipments of goods arrived, beginning an era of foreign shipments that would last until the mid-1960s. The last passenger steamboat left South Haven for Chicago on Labor Day, 1941, though recreational boating increased steadily. In the 1950s and 1960s several new factories came to the area, and although the resort businesses in the area began to flounder, the resorts that remained grew stronger.

In 1970, "The Centennial Celebration and Blueberry Festival" took place, and the city's 64-slip marina was dedicated. To this day the Blueberry Festival continues to draw many visitors to the city. Other events, such as the Ice Breaker Festival, Harborfest, the art shows and Fourth of July fireworks display remain very popular. The beaches, boating and relaxing atmosphere will continue to ensure that the City of South Haven remains a popular warm-weather destination. The South Pier Lighthouse, built in 1903 to replace the light established in 1872, is still operational, and is accessible from a public beach.

South Haven is home to a public school district as well as Roman Catholic and Lutheran parochial grammar schools. In addition, Western Michigan University and Lake Michigan College, a junior college, have branch campuses located within the city. The city has annexed portions of South Haven Township, Van Buren County and a small portion of Casco Township, Allegan County.

== Geography ==
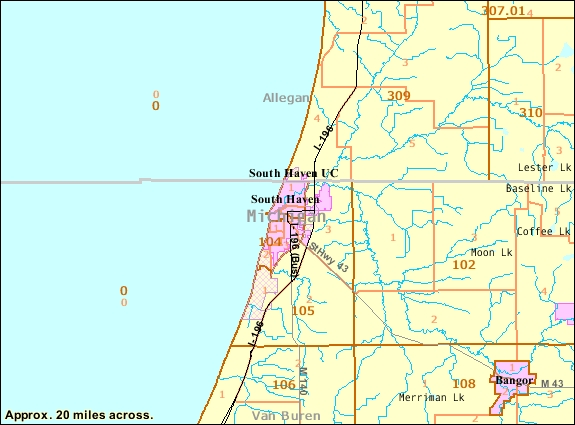
Boundaries of South Haven, Michigan

According to the United States Census Bureau, the city has a total area of 3.50 square miles (9.06 km^{2}), of which 3.40 square miles (8.81 km^{2}) is land and 0.10 square miles (0.26 km^{2}) is water. The surrounding area is known as South Haven Charter Township, and as yet is unincorporated.

=== Climate ===
According to the Köppen climate classification, South Haven borders on a maritime and continental influenced climate, having a microclimate. The extreme western ends are classified as oceanic (Cfb), while the inner parts of the city border on a hot-summer continental climate (Dfa), with moderation by Lake Michigan. The summers are hot and humid, while the winters are mild and cold with frequent thaws.

Climate data for South Haven, Michigan (1991–2020 normals, extremes 1905–2019)
Month	Jan	Feb	Mar	Apr	May	Jun	Jul	Aug	Sep	Oct	Nov	Dec	Year
Record high °F (°C)	67 (19)	71 (22)	81 (27)	89 (32)	97 (36)	100 (38)	99 (37)	99 (37)	97 (36)	90 (32)	78 (26)	71 (22)	100 (38)
Mean daily maximum °F (°C)	33.5 (0.8)	35.8 (2.1)	44.8 (7.1)	56.1 (13.4)	67.7 (19.8)	75.9 (24.4)	80.0 (26.7)	79.1 (26.2)	73.7 (23.2)	62.2 (16.8)	49.2 (9.6)	38.6 (3.7)	58.1 (14.5)
Daily mean °F (°C)	27.8 (−2.3)	29.8 (−1.2)	37.4 (3.0)	47.7 (8.7)	58.5 (14.7)	67.8 (19.9)	72.8 (22.7)	71.6 (22.0)	65.5 (18.6)	54.9 (12.7)	42.7 (5.9)	33.3 (0.7)	50.8 (10.4)
Mean daily minimum °F (°C)	22.1 (−5.5)	23.9 (−4.5)	29.9 (−1.2)	39.3 (4.1)	49.4 (9.7)	59.6 (15.3)	65.6 (18.7)	64.0 (17.8)	57.2 (14.0)	47.5 (8.6)	36.2 (2.3)	27.9 (−2.3)	43.5 (6.4)
Record low °F (°C)	−14 (−26)	−22 (−30)	−4 (−20)	7 (−14)	24 (−4)	35 (2)	39 (4)	37 (3)	26 (−3)	15 (−9)	−10 (−23)	−12 (−24)	−22 (−30)
Average precipitation inches (mm)	2.71 (69)	2.04 (52)	2.25 (57)	3.58 (91)	3.91 (99)	3.73 (95)	3.16 (80)	3.70 (94)	3.19 (81)	3.89 (99)	2.68 (68)	2.38 (60)	37.22 (945)
Average snowfall inches (cm)	29.7 (75)	14.4 (37)	6.6 (17)	1.5 (3.8)	0 (0)	0 (0)	0 (0)	0 (0)	0 (0)	0.5 (1.3)	8.6 (22)	24.6 (62)	85.9 (218)
Average precipitation days (≥ 0.01 in)	7.3	5.1	7.7	10.4	11.2	8.6	7.7	8.5	9.8	11.3	10.1	7.8	105.4
Average snowy days (≥ 0.1 in)	6.9	5.4	1.3	0.4	0	0	0	0	0	0	0.7	6.7	21.5
Source: NOAA (precipitation days, snowfall, snow days 1981–2010)

== Architecture ==
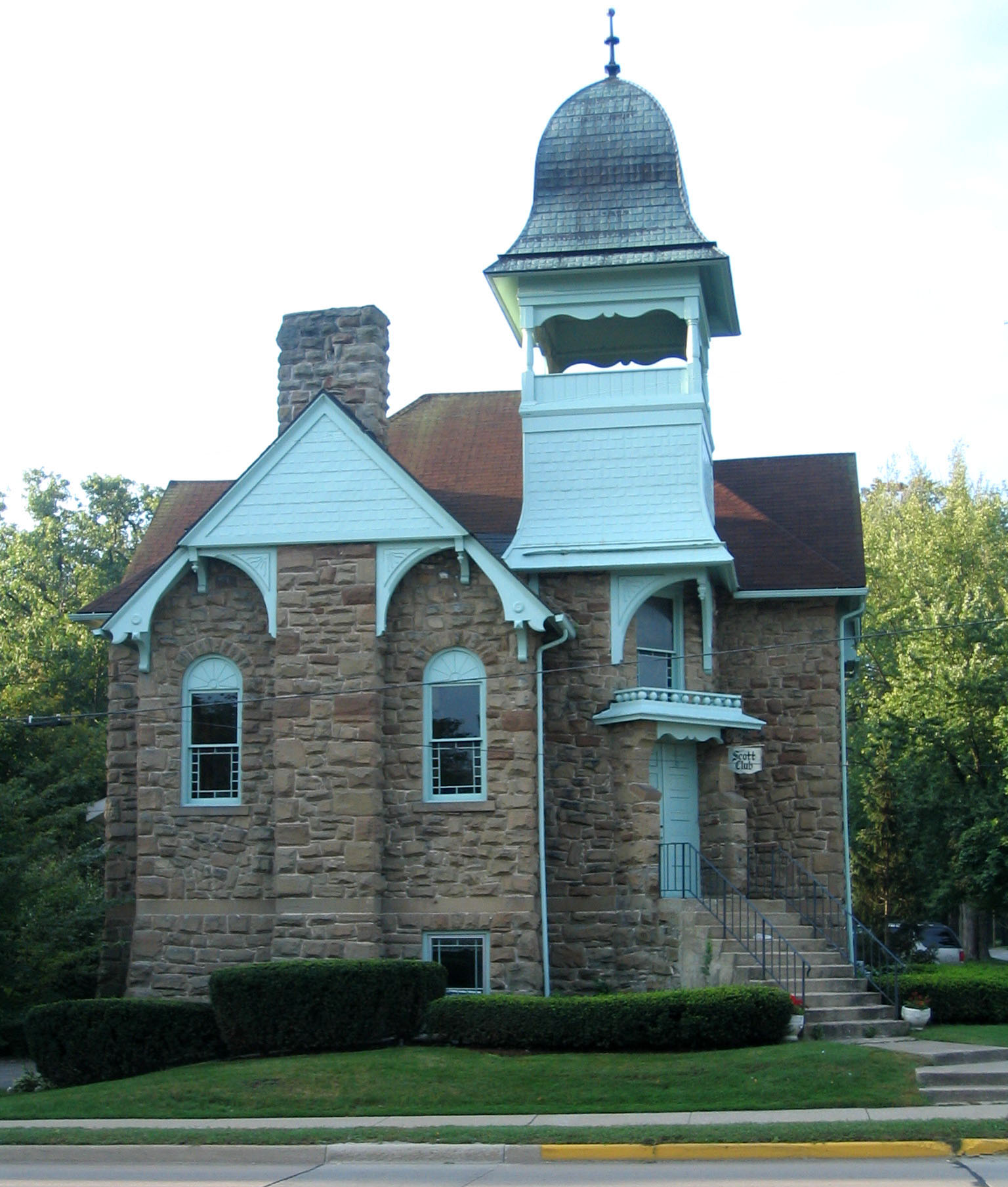
Scott Club on Phoenix St.

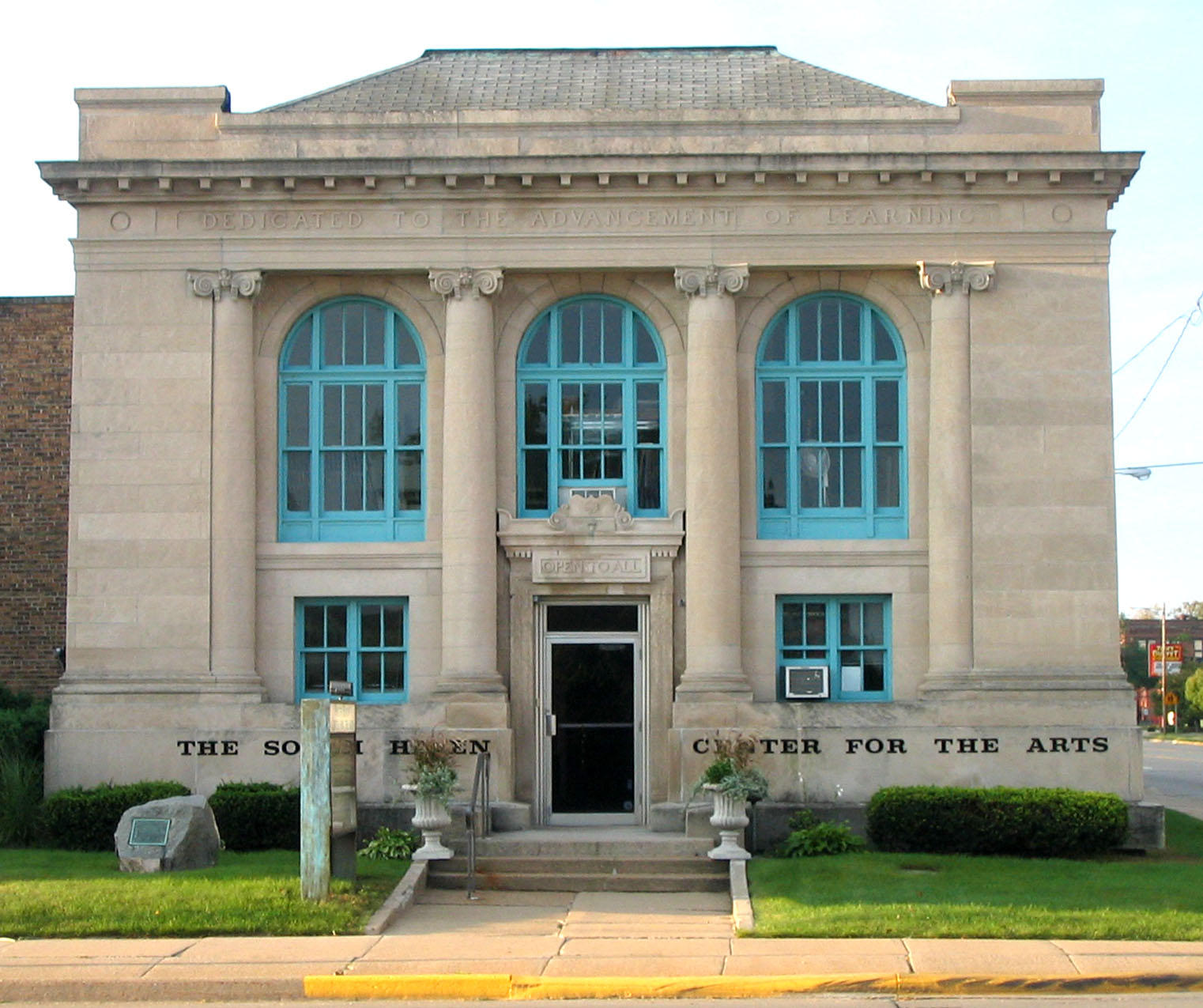
1906 Carnegie Library, now housing South Haven Center for the Arts

The Scott Club on Phoenix St. was designed by South Haven architect John Cornelius Randall and constructed in 1891. The club house has two large stained glass windows portraying Sir Walter Scott and Henry Wadsworth Longfellow. The South Haven Center for the Arts is housed in the 1906 neoclassical Carnegie Library, also on Phoenix St.

The Liberty Hyde Bailey Museum is housed in the birth-site home of Liberty Hyde Bailey Jr. This Greek Revival farmhouse is one of the oldest houses in South Haven.

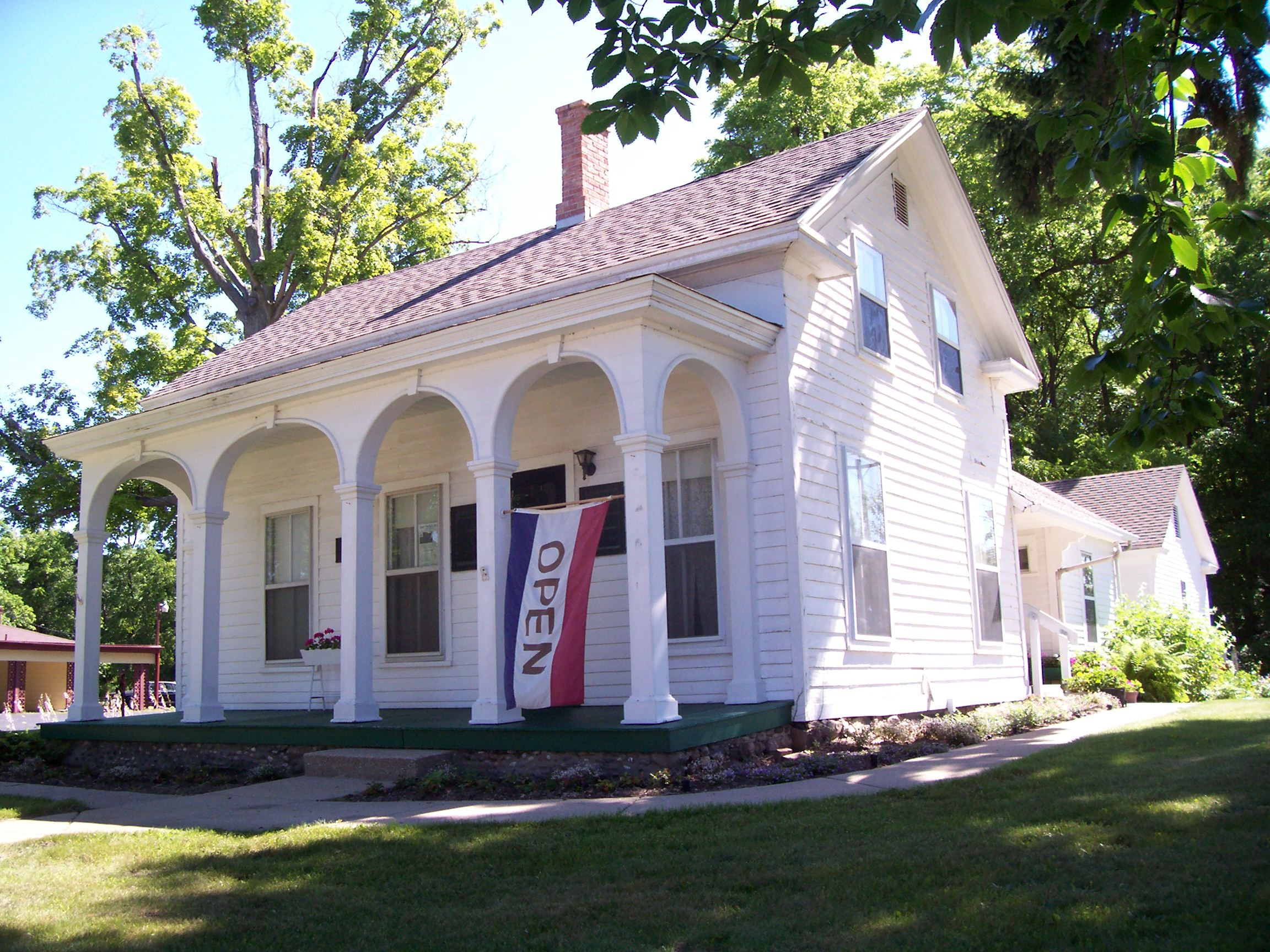
Liberty Hyde Bailey Museum

== Demographics ==
Historical population
Census	Pop.	Note	%±
1860	308		—
1870	1,576		411.7%
1880	1,442		−8.5%
1890	1,924		33.4%
1900	4,009		108.4%
1910	3,577		−10.8%
1920	3,829		7.0%
1930	4,804		25.5%
1940	4,745		−1.2%
1950	5,629		18.6%
1960	6,149		9.2%
1970	6,471		5.2%
1980	5,943		−8.2%
1990	5,563		−6.4%
2000	5,021		−9.7%
2010	4,403		−12.3%
2020	3,964		−10.0%
U.S. Decennial Census

=== 2020 census ===
As of the 2020 census, South Haven had a population of 3,964. The median age was 56.2 years. 16.2% of residents were under the age of 18 and 32.7% of residents were 65 years of age or older. For every 100 females there were 81.8 males, and for every 100 females age 18 and over there were 79.0 males age 18 and over.

100.0% of residents lived in urban areas, while 0.0% lived in rural areas.

There were 1,935 households and 1,302 families in the city. Of all households, 18.8% had children under the age of 18 living in them, 39.1% were married-couple households, 19.2% were households with a male householder and no spouse or partner present, and 37.0% were households with a female householder and no spouse or partner present. About 40.7% of all households were made up of individuals and 21.5% had someone living alone who was 65 years of age or older. The average household size was 2.26 and the average family size was 2.89.

There were 3,560 housing units, of which 1,935 (54.4%) were occupied and 1,625 (45.6%) were vacant. The homeowner vacancy rate was 1.5% and the rental vacancy rate was 15.6%.

Racial composition as of the 2020 census
Race	Number	Percent
White	3,039	76.7%
Black or African American	496	12.5%
American Indian and Alaska Native	35	0.9%
Asian	29	0.7%
Native Hawaiian and Other Pacific Islander	1	0.0%
Some other race	95	2.4%
Two or more races	269	6.8%
Hispanic or Latino (of any race)	221	5.6%

=== Demographic estimates ===
The median income for a household in the city in 2022 was $58,043. The per capita income for the city was $45,398.

=== 2010 census ===
As of the census of 2010, there were 4,403 people, 1,959 households, and 1,126 families living in the city. The population density was 1,295.0 inhabitants per square mile (500.0/km^{2}). There were 3,346 housing units at an average density of 984.1 per square mile (380.0/km^{2}). The racial makeup of the city was 81.7% White, 13.3% African American, 0.7% Native American, 0.5% Asian, 0.1% Pacific Islander, 0.9% from other races, and 2.9% from two or more races. Hispanic or Latino of any race were 3.8% of the population.

There were 1,959 households, of which 24.5% had children under the age of 18 living with them, 39.6% were married couples living together, 15.0% had a female householder with no husband present, 3.0% had a male householder with no wife present, and 42.5% were non-families. 36.9% of all households were made up of individuals, and 15.6% had someone living alone who was 65 years of age or older. The average household size was 2.17 and the average family size was 2.80.

The median age in the city was 47.7 years. 20.2% of residents were under the age of 18; 7.9% were between the ages of 18 and 24; 19.1% were from 25 to 44; 30.2% were from 45 to 64; and 22.5% were 65 years of age or older. The gender makeup of the city was 44.9% male and 55.1% female.

=== 2000 census ===
As of the census of 2000, there were 5,021 people, 2,095 households, and 1,330 families living in the city. The population density was 1,452.3 inhabitants per square mile (560.7/km^{2}). There were 2,979 housing units at an average density of 861.6 per square mile (332.7/km^{2}). The racial makeup of the city was 82.75% White, 12.83% African American, 0.70% Native American, 0.70% Asian, 1.04% from other races, and 1.99% from two or more races. Hispanic or Latino of any race were 2.33% of the population.

There were 2,095 households, out of which 27.8% had children under the age of 18 living with them, 47.4% were married couples living together, 12.7% had a female householder with no husband present, and 36.5% were non-families. 31.7% of all households were made up of individuals, and 14.1% had someone living alone who was 65 years of age or older. The average household size was 2.30 and the average family size was 2.90.

In the city, the population was spread out, with 23.6% under the age of 18, 6.3% from 18 to 24, 24.2% from 25 to 44, 25.6% from 45 to 64, and 20.3% who were 65 years of age or older. The median age was 42 years. For every 100 females, there were 85.3 males. For every 100 females age 18 and over, there were 80.4 males.

The median income for a household in the city was $35,885, and the median income for a family was $46,307. Males had a median income of $37,089 versus $25,486 for females. The per capita income for the city was $19,396. About 7.8% of families and 9.8% of the population were below the poverty line, including 10.2% of those under age 18 and 13.9% of those age 65 or over.

== Cultural attractions ==
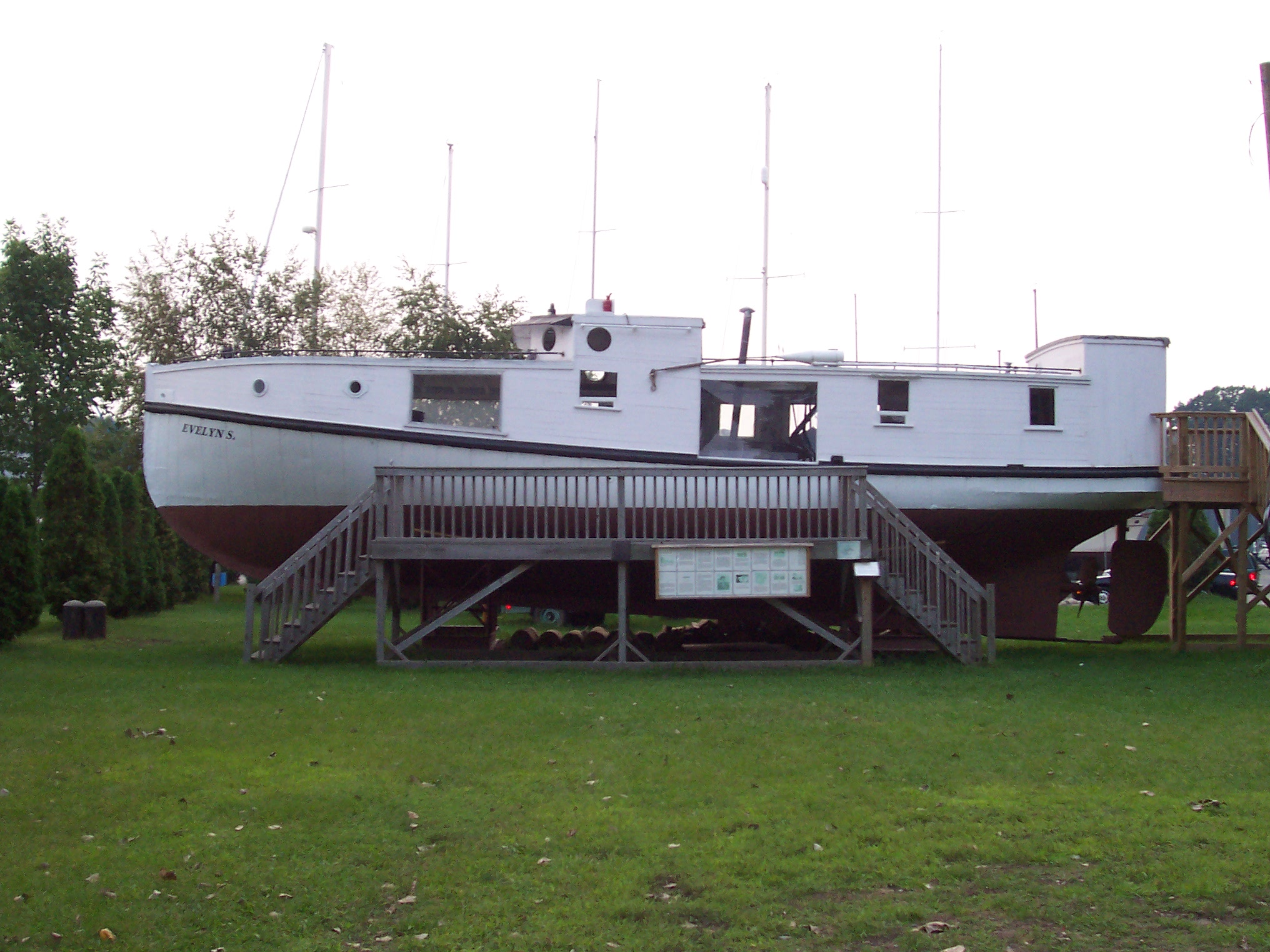
The Evelyn S., a Great Lakes fish tug at the Michigan Maritime Museum

South Haven offers an interesting array of cultural attractions. The Michigan Maritime Museum, host of the tall ship Friends Good Will, is perhaps its most famous. The Michigan Maritime Museum also hosts an electrically powered river launch called the Lindy Lou. River launch boats were used in the 1890s to the 1930s to ferry passengers up the Black River to various resorts and parks. Visitors are able to buy tickets to ride either ship – the Lindy Lou stays on the river, while the Friends Good Will goes down the river and onto Lake Michigan.

The Historical Association of South Haven, which now operates out of the old Hartman School, which it is refurbishing, is devoted to documenting and retelling the city's rich history.

The Michigan Flywheelers Museum allows visitors to experience the life of early local farmers. Attractions include exhibits of antique flywheel engines and tractors, an old town area with an old jail, farm machinery shop and an exhibit building called "The Farm History Building".

During the winter months the city's ice rink is open. There is a daily fee for entrance and for rental skates, and also season passes are available.

== Notable people ==
- Liberty Hyde Bailey, co-founder of American Society for Horticultural Science and considered the Father of Modern Horticulture
- Nate Barnes, country music singer
- Pamela Carter, Indiana Attorney General (1993–1997)
- Dave Gumpert, professional baseball player
- Wendy Anderson Halperin, children's book illustrator and author
- Cindy Hill, winner of 1974 U.S. Women's Amateur and two-time winner on LPGA Tour
- Becky Johnston, Academy Award-nominated screenwriter of The Prince of Tides
- Drakkar Klose, Ultimate Fighting Championship fighter
- Mark Lenard, Star Trek actor known for playing Spock's father
- Daniel K. Ludwig, shipping magnate and #1 on first Forbes list of 400 Richest Americans in 1982
- James McCloughan, Vietnam veteran and Medal of Honor recipient
- Kennedy McIntosh, professional basketball player
- Audrey Niffenegger, author of The Time Traveler's Wife
- Joseph P. Overton, political scientist, author of the Overton window concept
- Jeffrey R. Riemer, retired United States Air Force major general
- Art Walker, professional football player
- Kaliesha West, professional boxer
- D'arcy Wretzky, former bass player of The Smashing Pumpkins
- J.C. Hartsfield, co-founder of Heartsfield

== Sources ==
- South Haven history
