= Charles Umlauf =

American artist (1911–1994)

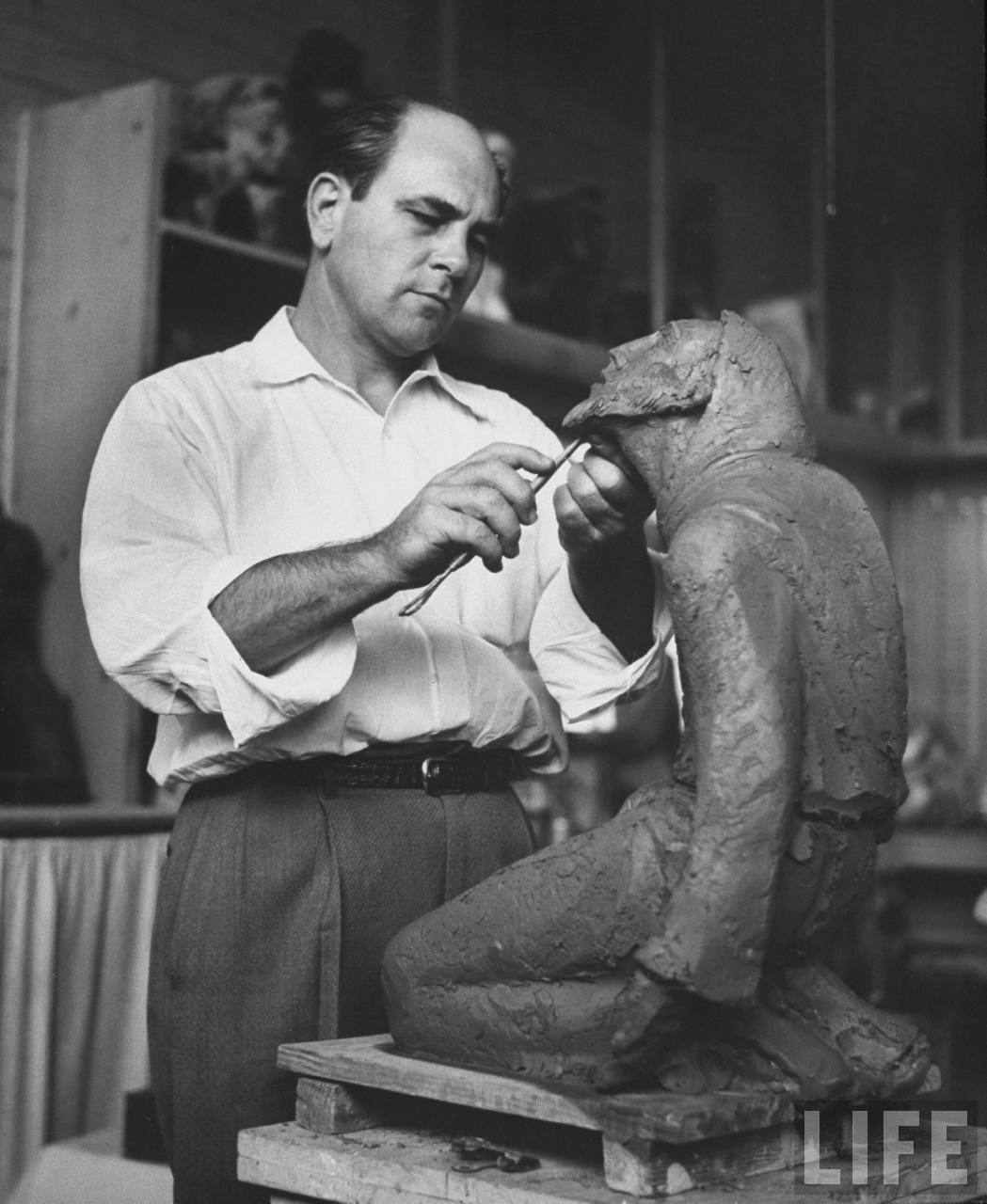
- Born: July 17, 1911; South Haven, Michigan
- Died: November 19, 1994; Austin, Texas
- Education: Art Institute of Chicago
- Known for: Sculpture
- Spouse: Angeline (Angie) Umlauf
- Patrons: WPA

Charles Umlauf (July 17, 1911 – November 19, 1994) was an American sculptor and teacher who was born in South Haven, Michigan. His sculptures can be found in churches, numerous public institutions, outdoor locations, and museums, including the Houston Museum of Fine Arts, the Smithsonian Institution in Washington, D.C, and the Metropolitan Museum of Art in New York, as well as in many private collections. Umlauf received a number of accolades, including a Guggenheim Fellowship and a Ford Foundation Grant.

In 1941 Umlauf accepted a position at the University of Texas School of Art in Austin, Texas, where he taught for 40 years. Artists teaching at UT included Loren Mozley, Everett Spruce, Kelly Fearing, Seymour Fogel, and William Lester. Umlauf retired as Professor Emeritus in 1981. In 1985, he and his wife Angeline Allen Umlauf gave their Austin home, Umlauf's studio, and 168 sculptures to the City of Austin. Based on this gift and considerable community support, the UMLAUF Sculpture Garden and Museum was founded and opened its doors in 1991 at 605 Azie Morton Road in Austin, Texas. The UMLAUF is a private–public partnership with the City of Austin.

== Early life ==
Charles Umlauf was born in South Haven, Michigan, on a large farm where his family lived and worked. He was the sixth of eight children born to immigrant parents Christian Heinrich (Bavarian) and Charlotte Derouet (Alsatian). The Umlauf children were named Heinrich, Marie, Charlotte, Wilhelm, Edouard, Karl, Emelia, and Louis. The family moved frequently in search of work.

The Umlauf family suffered from anti-German sentiment during the first World War. The family Americanized their names (Heinrich to Henry, Wilhelm to William, Karl to Charles) to avoid persecution in their Michigan town and schools. After enactment of the Espionage Act of 1917, Umlauf's father was falsely accused of spying while working at an ammunition plant. Soon after, the windows were shattered in the family home. This treatment would influence the subjects and expression in Charles' work. In 1918 the entire family relocated to Chicago in search of greater opportunities for work.

Umlauf discovered sculpture early in his life, when he was a child, playing in the sand at Lake Michigan. He watched a sand artist on the beach, and subsequently sculpted a life-size sand sculpture of his own. Umlauf claimed that he knew at the age of ten that he was going to be a sculptor. At this age, he was living with his family in Chicago.

In 1922, Christian Umlauf died, further impoverishing the family. Charlotte Umlauf died only 6 years later, leaving the children orphans and emotionally devastated. Charlotte had been a fervent supporter of artistic education for her children, spending a portion of their meager income on music lessons for Charles and his siblings.

== Work ==
In 1918, when Charles was eight years old, the Umlauf family moved to Chicago. Charles and his brothers worked as caddies at Oak Park and Bryn Mawr Country Clubs. Charles was encouraged to pursue his artistic interests by his sister, Marie, who paid for her 11-year-old brother to attend weekend classes at the Art Institute of Chicago (AIC). He soon earned a scholarship for continued study. Umlauf was interested in carving and forming figures from an early age. Based on a small lion he molded in clay, Charles received his first commission of a full-sized lion in 1922, at age eleven.

In 1929 Umlauf began three years of study with Albin Polasek at the AIC. He subsequently spent one year as an assistant to Lorado Taft at his Midway Studio before returning to the AIC where he remained until 1937. Those years saw a growth in Umlauf's interest in the more abstract sculptures being produced in Europe, and as a consequence, his own art became increasingly abstracted.

From 1934 through 1941, Umlauf was employed by the WPA Federal Art Project, created during the Great Depression. He sculpted for several Federal projects, including two monumental sculptural heads for Merchandise Mart and sculptures for Cook County Hospital. His 1939 work War Mother caught the attention of Marion Koogler McNay and professors at the newly formed Art Department at the University of Texas at Austin. They offered him a position as Professor of Life Drawing and Sculpture and the Umlaufs permanently moved to Austin in 1943.

== Mentorship ==
During his tenure at the University of Texas, Charles Umlauf taught many art students, including Farrah Fawcett. Fawcett, an art major, called Umlauf her "favorite professor" and they began a close mentoring relationship. Fawcett took classes and worked with Umlauf in his studio, as well as occasionally sitting for him as a muse. Her sculpture work is similar to Umlauf's in style. Work by Fawcett was exhibited at the UMLAUF in 2017 in the Mentoring a Muse exhibition. Another of his pupils was Bob "Daddy-O" Wade, who studied at the University of Texas from 1961 to 1965, and later became famous for his larger-than-life sized works inspired by Texan cowboy culture.

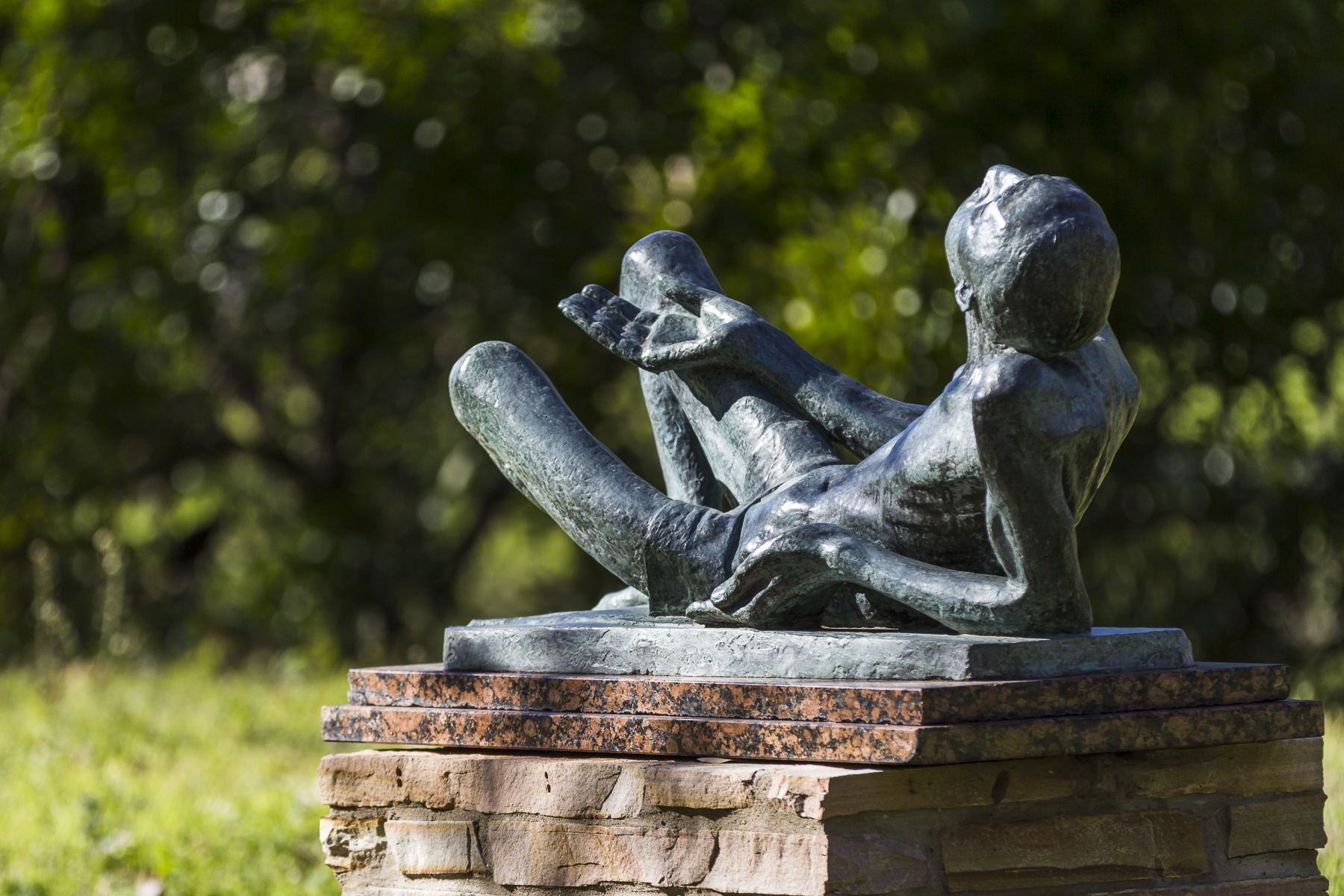
Lazarus, 1950, bronze

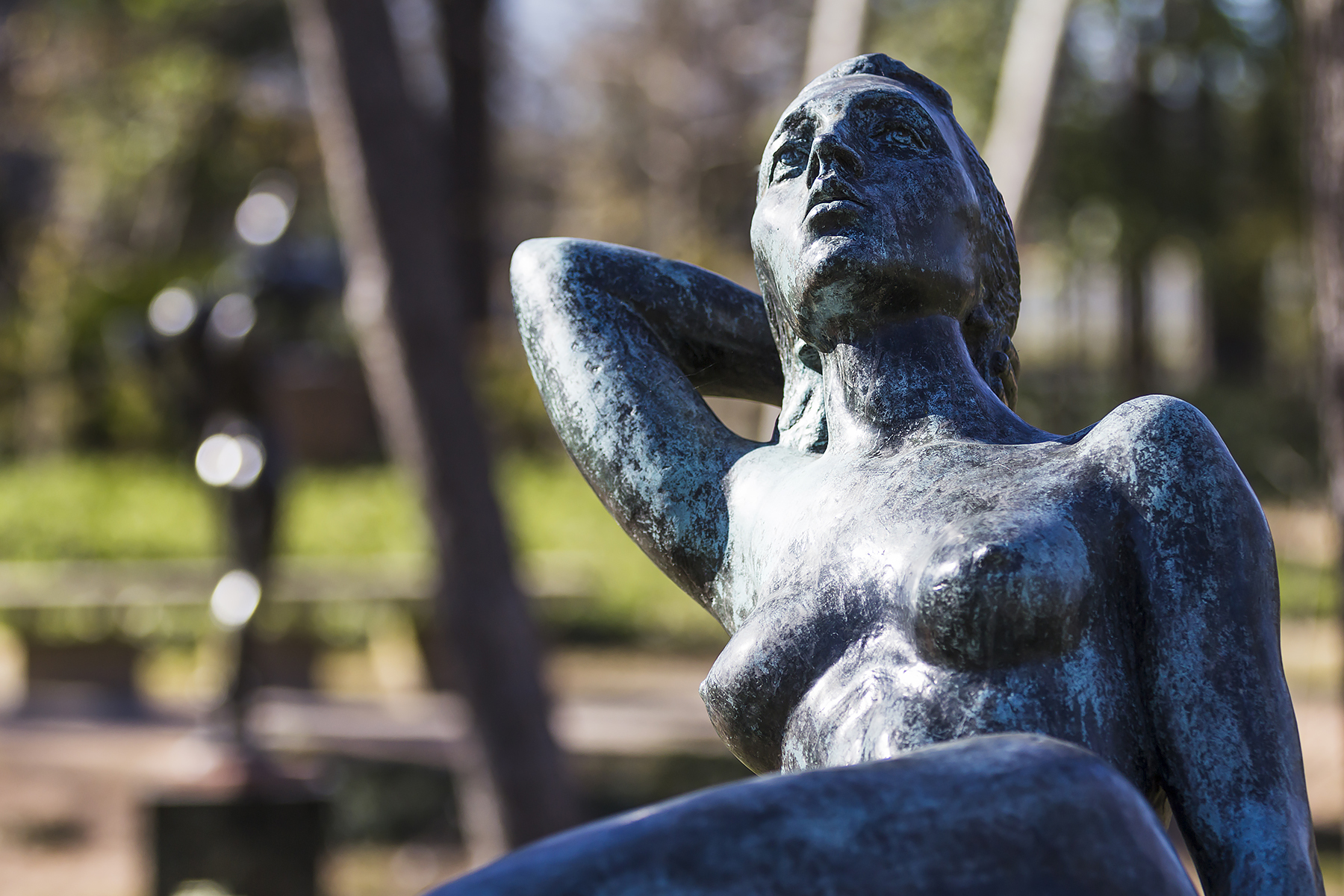
Reclining Nude, 1958, bronze

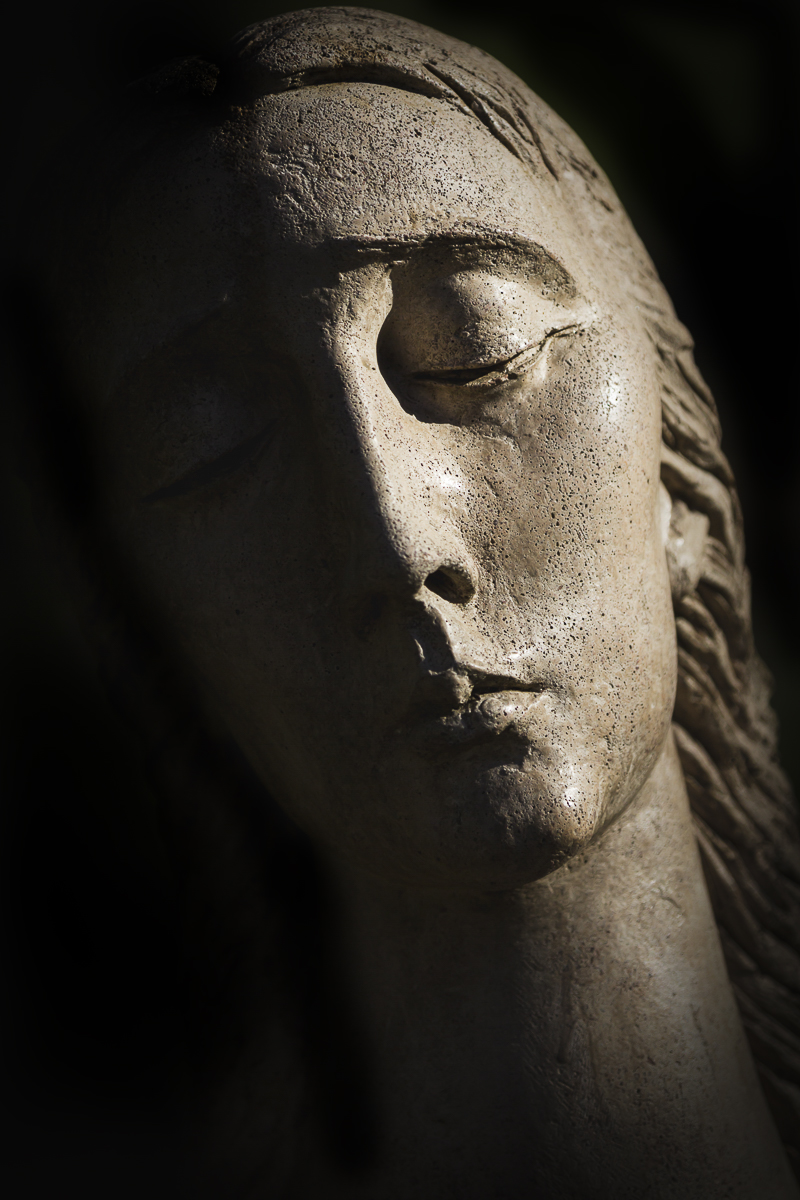
Mother & Child, 1950, cast stone

== Selected works ==
- Spirit of Communication, Post Office, Morton Illinois, 1939
- Protection, and Mosaic Pool, Cook County Hospital, Chicago, Illinois, 1940
- Paulding Industries, Post Office, Paulding, Illinois, 1940
- Boy with Sea Forms, Lane Technical High School, Chicago Illinois, 1941
- Madonna and Child
- The Torchbearers, Austin, Texas, 1962
