= U.S. Route 31 in Michigan =

U.S. Highway in Michigan

US Highway 31
- US 31 highlighted in red

Route information
- Maintained by MDOT
- Length: 355.179 mi (571.605 km)
- Existed: November 11, 1926–present
- Tourist routes: Lake Michigan Circle Tour; West Michigan Pike Pure Michigan Byway

Major junctions
- South end: US 31 near Niles
- US 12 near Niles; I-94 / I-196 near Benton Harbor; I-196 at Holland; I-96 near Muskegon; US 10 at Ludington; US 131 at Petoskey
- North end: I-75 near Mackinaw City

Location
- Country: United States
- State: Michigan
- Counties: Berrien, Van Buren, Allegan, Ottawa, Muskegon, Oceana, Mason, Manistee, Benzie, Grand Traverse, Antrim, Charlevoix, Emmet, Cheboygan

Highway system
- United States Numbered Highway System; List; Special; Divided; Michigan State Trunkline Highway System; Interstate; US; State; Byways
← M-30	→ Bus. US 31

US Highway 31 (US 31) is a part of the United States Numbered Highway System that runs from Alabama to the Lower Peninsula of the US state of Michigan. In Michigan, it is a state trunkline highway that runs along the western portion of the Lower Peninsula, from the Indiana–Michigan state line at Bertrand Township north to its terminus at Interstate 75 (I-75) south of Mackinaw City. Along its 355.2-mile-long (571.6 km) route, US 31 follows the Michigan section of the St. Joseph Valley Parkway as well as other freeways and divided highways northward to Ludington. North of there, the trunkline is a rural undivided highway through the Northern Michigan tourist destinations of Traverse City and Petoskey before terminating south of Mackinaw City. Along its route, US 31 has been dedicated in memory of a few different organizations, and sections of it carry the Lake Michigan Circle Tour (LMCT) moniker. Four bridges used by the highway have been recognized for their historic character as well.

The first highways along the route of the modern US 31 corridor were the West Michigan Pike, an auto trail from 1913, and later a pair of state trunklines (the original M-11 and M-58) in 1919. These state highways were redesignated US 31 on November 11, 1926, when the US Highway System was approved. Since then, the highway has been realigned in places. The highway crossed the Straits of Mackinac by ferry for about a decade in the 1920s and 1930s before the Mackinac Bridge was built, connecting to US 2 north of St. Ignace. Later, sections were converted into freeways starting in the 1950s. These segments opened through the subsequent decades with the last one opening in 2022. Future plans by the Michigan Department of Transportation (MDOT) include a bypass of Grand Haven.

== Route description ==
Between Lake Michigan Beach and the northern terminus south of Mackinaw City, most of US 31 forms a portion of the Lake Michigan Circle Tour (LMCT) except where the various business loops run between the main highway and Lake Michigan. Additionally, much of the highway from the Indiana–Michigan state line to Ludington is built to freeway standards, with a notable exception being between Holland and Ferrysburg. The remainder of US 31 is a two- or four-lane highway with some sections in cities comprising five lanes. The entire length of the highway is listed on the National Highway System, a network of roads important to the US's economy, defense, and mobility.

=== St. Joseph Valley Parkway and I-196 ===
US 31 and the St. Joseph Valley Parkway crosses into Michigan from Indiana southwest of Niles and parallels the St. Joseph River as the two run northward through southwest Michigan. The freeway passes through farmland before crossing US 12 at the first of a set of three interchanges located between Niles on the east and Buchanan on the west. US 31 crosses the river north of the interchange with Niles–Buchanan Road. North of the Walton Road interchange, the freeway turns northwesterly to recross the St. Joseph River near Lake Chapin south of Berrien Springs. The parkway curves around the west side of town before crossing the river for a third time. As US 31 continues northward parallel to the river, it enters the eastern fringes of the Benton Harbor–St. Joseph area. The freeway continues north of Napier Avenue and curves to the northwest to an interchange with Business Loop I-94 (BL I-94) and I-94, merging onto the latter. I-94/US 31 runs concurrently on a northeasterly course before meeting the southern end of I-196 in Benton Township.

At this trumpet interchange, I-196/US 31 runs north from I-94 and passes to the west of the Point O'Woods Golf & Country Club. It continues northward in rural Berrien County through farm fields. The trunkline turns northwesterly near the Lake Michigan Hills Golf Course and crosses the Paw Paw River. Past the river, the freeway turns northeasterly and runs roughly parallel to the Lake Michigan shoreline several miles inland. At the community of Lake Michigan Beach, I-196/US 31 meets the northern terminus of M-63 at exit 7, and the LMCT joins the freeway for the first time. North of this interchange, the freeway parallels a county road (A-2, the Blue Star Highway) that is the former route of US 31.

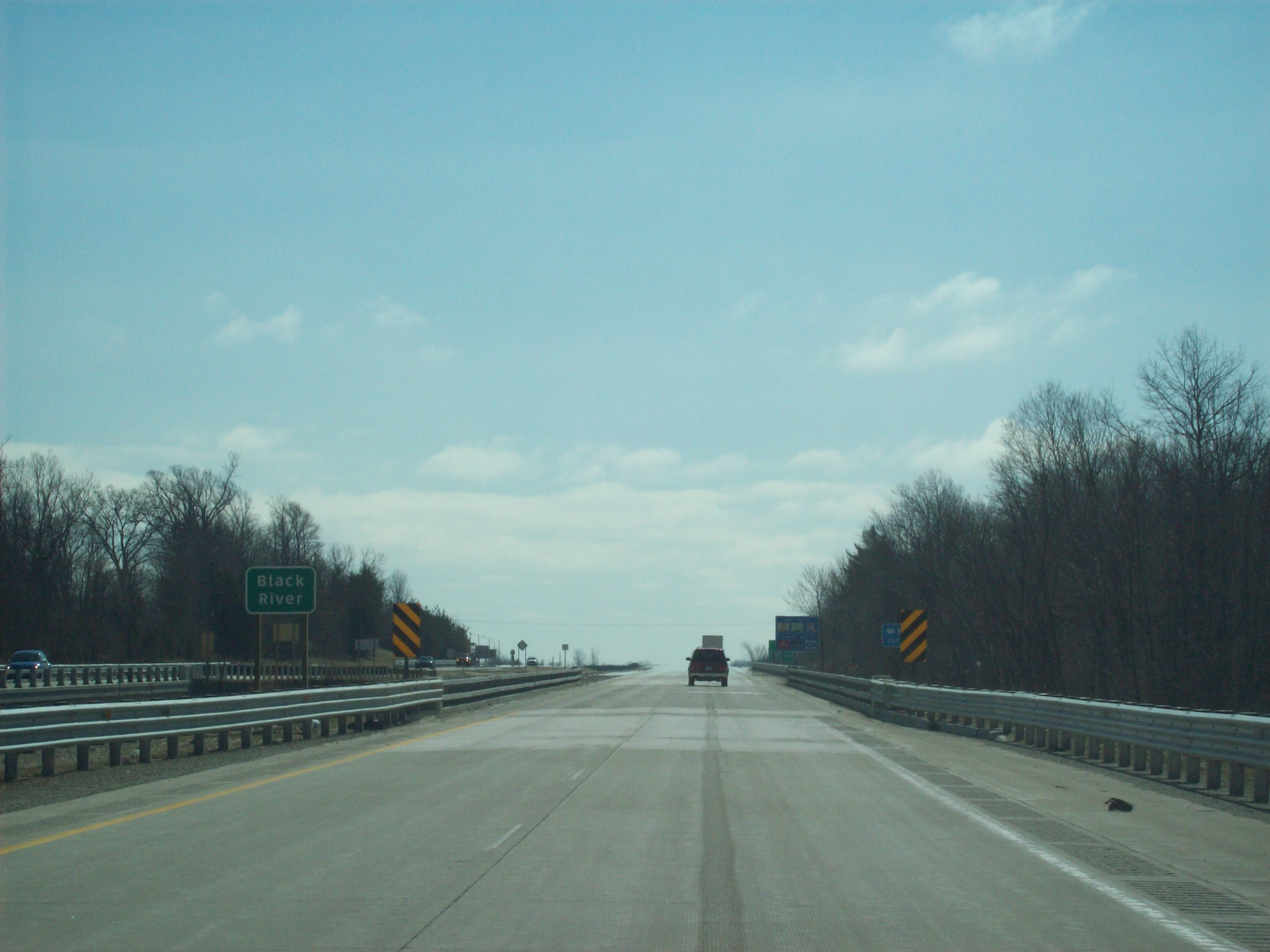
Crossing the Black River bridge near South Haven on I-196/US 31

Further north, I-196/US 31 crosses into Van Buren County and assumes the Gerald R. Ford Freeway name. The inland side of the freeway is forested while the lakeward side is predominantly either forest or fields. As it approaches South Haven, the freeway passes near the Palisades Nuclear Generating Station and Van Buren State Park. North of the power plant and park, the freeway turns farther inland to bypass the city of South Haven. There is an interchange on the south side of town that provides access to BL I-196 and M-140. The freeway crosses over M-43 without an interchange and then intersects the other end of the business loop about two miles (3.2 km) later. It crosses the Black River near the Van Buren–Allegan county line.

In Allegan County, I-196/US 31 passes a pair of golf courses and continues northward through farm fields. Near the community of Glenn, A-2 crosses over the freeway and runs parallel to it on the east. The two roads trade places again when I-196/US 31 turns northeasterly on the south side of the twin cities of Saugatuck and Douglas. The freeway crosses over a section of Kalamazoo Lake, a wider section of the Kalamazoo River that flows between the two towns. A-2 crosses back to the eastern side of the freeway north of Saugatuck, and I-196/US 31 continues north-northeasterly toward Holland.

On the south side of Holland, US 31 and I-196 separate as the Interstate turns northeasterly around the city to continue to Grand Rapids. US 31 follows the BL I-196 freeway northward into Holland around the north side of the West Michigan Regional Airport. The business loop has an interchange for A-2 (Blue Star Highway) and Washington Avenue before the freeway ends in the southern reaches of Holland. The trunkline then runs as a divided highway northward, bypassing downtown Holland to the east and intersecting M-40. Northeast of downtown Holland, BL I-196 leaves US 31 and the LMCT at an interchange to follow an expressway along the route of Chicago Drive while US 31 turns northwesterly on its own expressway alignment.

=== West Michigan ===
Northwest of Holland, the highway runs as a four-lane expressway and divided highway parallel, but inland from, the Lake Michigan shoreline. This section of US 31 runs through a mix of farm fields and forests as it runs to the community of Agnew. There, US 31 intersects the western end of M-45 (Lake Michigan Drive) before continuing into the southern end of Grand Haven. In that city, the highway follows a four-lane boulevard with a grass median. On the northern edge of the city of Grand Haven, US 31 crosses the Grand River on a bascule bridge that opens about 450–500 times per year. North of the structure, US 31 transitions into a freeway at the interchange with the western end of M-104 in Ferrysburg. This freeway continues northward through the suburban edges of the Muskegon area and meets the western end of I-96 near the Muskegon County Airport in Norton Shores.

At this interchange with I-96, US 31 has its southernmost business loop as Business US 31 (Bus. US 31) runs westerly and northward into downtown Muskegon. The main freeway continues through the suburban eastern edge of the city through several interchanges, including one with M-46 (Apple Avenue). Just south of the Muskegon River, the business loop merges back into the main freeway. US 31 crosses the river and turns northwesterly through forests. The freeway passes to the east of Michigan's Adventure, an amusement park, and crosses the White River near the communities of Whitehall and Montague; a business loop curves off to the west to connect the two communities with the freeway. In this area, US 31 runs through the southern portion of the Manistee National Forest as well.

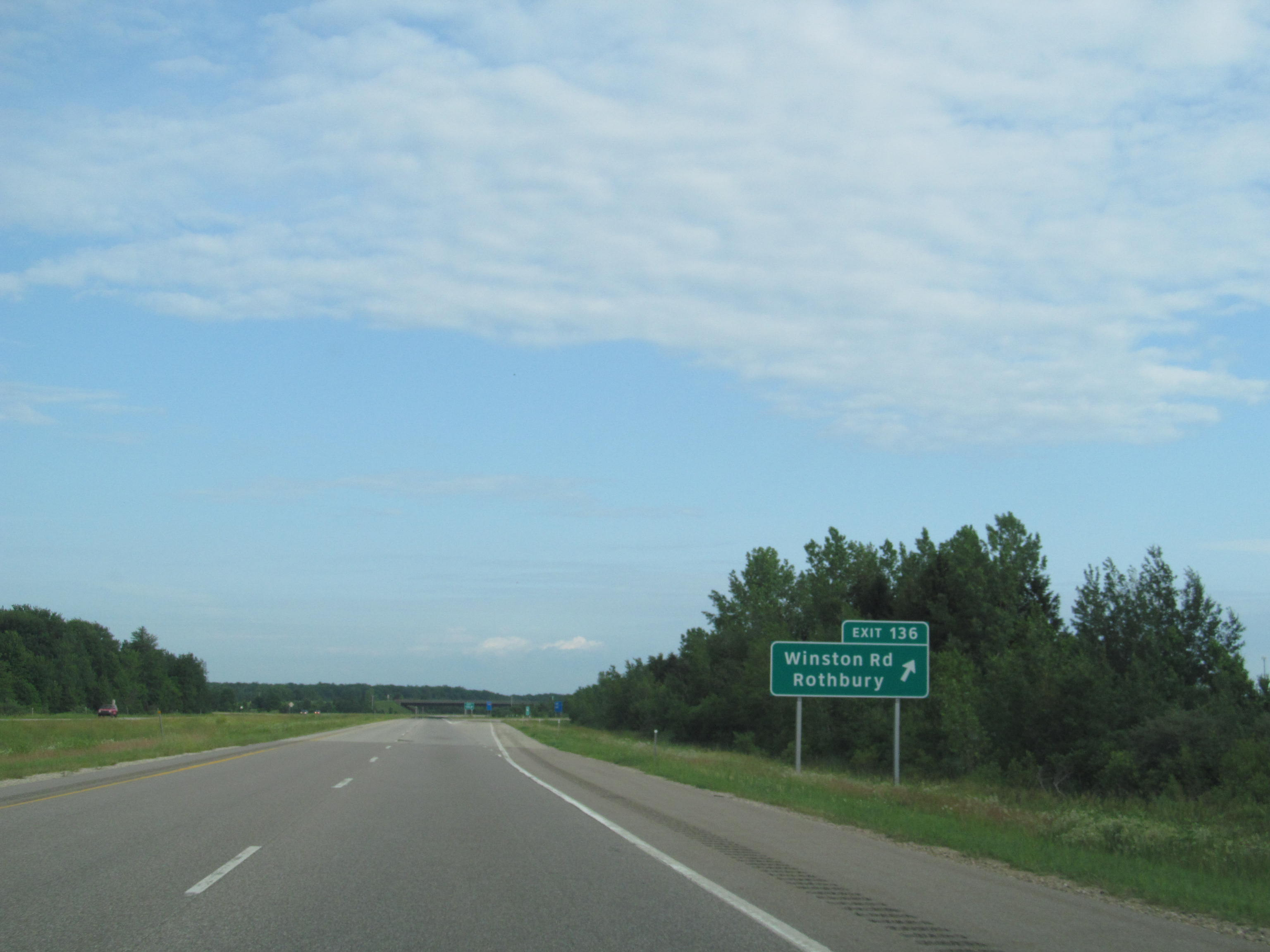
US 31 freeway near Rothbury

As the freeway continues northward, US 31 intersects the western end of M-20 in New Era in Oceana County. The landscape in this area is dominated by forest land as the trunkline crosses the Hart-Montague Trail State Park, a linear state park that follows a bike trail in the area. North of the trail crossing, US 31 has a business spur for Hart that runs east into that town; north of this interchange, the freeway crosses the Pentwater River near the community of Pentwater.

North of Pentwater, US 31 crosses into Mason County and passes Bass Lake and the Ludington Pumped Storage Power Plant, which uses a reservoir next to the freeway to generate electricity. Just north of that reservoir, the freeway turns to the northeast and Ludington's business spur runs off to the northwest. US 31 curves around the east side of Ludington, crossing the Pere Marquette River. Due east of downtown, the freeway ends and US 31 turns east to merge with US 10. The concurrent highways follow a four-lane roadway to Scottville. On the west side of that town, US 31 separates from US 10, turning northward to bypass Scottville.

=== Northwest Michigan ===
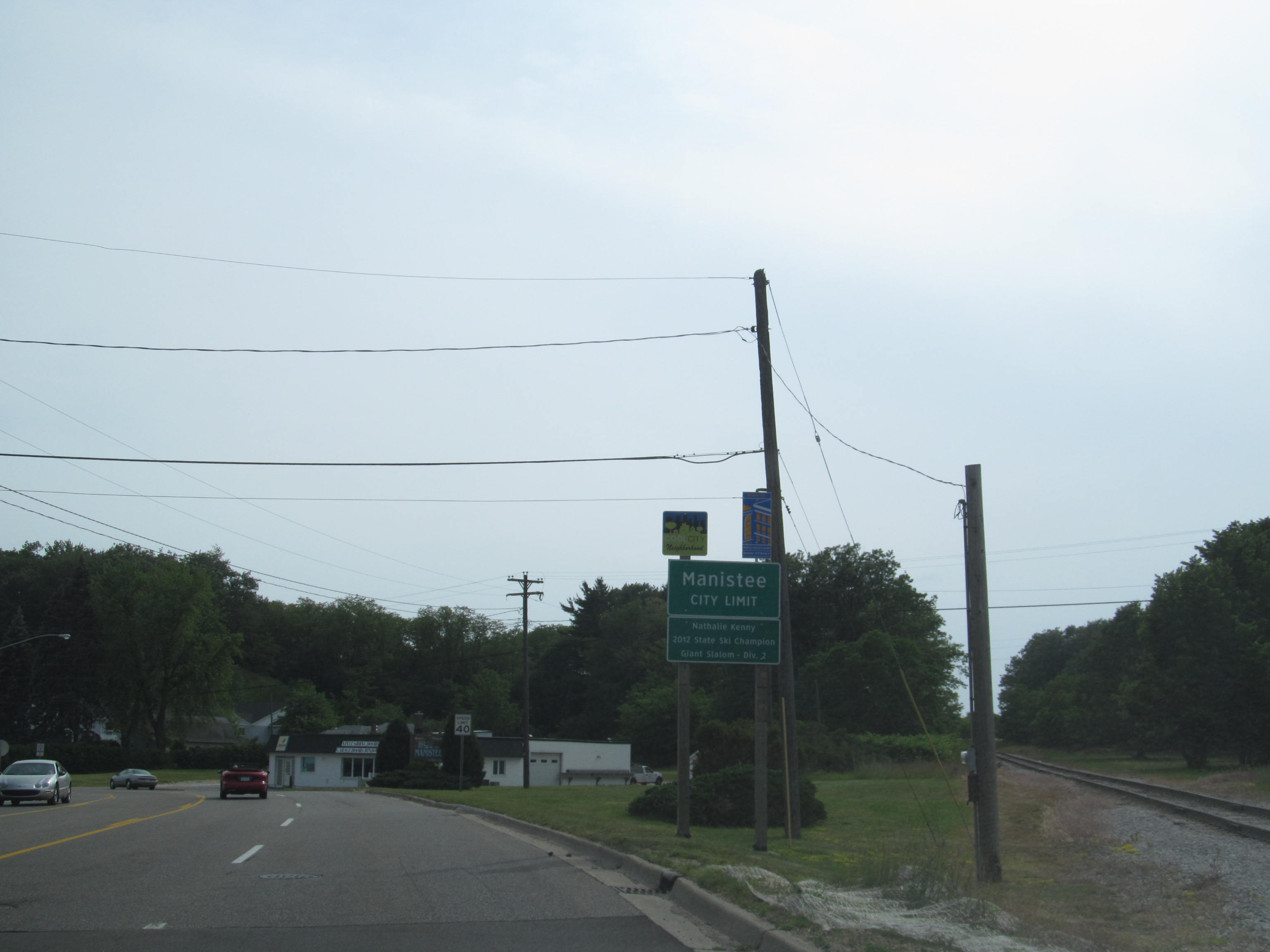
US 31 entering Manistee

US 31 runs due north through Northwest Michigan forest land bypassing Freesoil to the west. Northwest of that town, the highway crosses the Big Sable River before entering Manistee County. Across the county line, the trunkline runs northwesterly parallel to Manistee Lake as US 31 enters Manistee. The highway follows Cypress Street to a drawbridge over the Manistee River and then Cleveland Street on the northern side. As the trunkline rounds the northern shore of Manistee Lake, it passes the SS City of Milwaukee, a car ferry preserved as a museum. From there, the highway runs northeasterly, intersecting the western end of M-55 (Caberfae Highway). Next to the Little River Casino, the highway intersects the southern end of M-22 (Orchard Highway), and the LMCT separates from US 31.

The highway continues on a northeasterly course running inland along Chippewa Highway to the community of Bear Lake. US 31 rounds the east side of the community's namesake body of water on Lake Street and exits town on Pleasanton Highway. The trunkline continues northward and northeasterly through Pleasanton and crosses into Benzie County. Over the county line, it follows Benzie Highway northward to an intersection with M-115 (Cadillac Highway). The two merge and run north into Benzonia, following Michigan Avenue in town. Near the south shore of Crystal Lake, M-115 turns westward toward Frankfort and US 31 follows Michigan Avenue into Beulah, running around the eastern end of the lake. Near the eastern end of Platte Lake, US 31 turns to run easterly into Honor before crossing into Grand Traverse County.

Across the county line, US 31 continues eastward, passing north of the community of Interlochen, intersecting the former M-137, which connected to Interlochen State Park. The highway then angles northeasterly north of Duck Lake and south of Silver Lake. A few miles farther east, US 31 meets M-37 at a location known as Chums Corners. The two highways join and run northward through the unincorporated community. It passes Turtle Creek Stadium, the home stadium for the Traverse City Pit Spitters, a minor-league baseball team. From there, US 31/M-37 runs downhill into Garfield Township. In this area, the highway passes through a cluster of retail stores and car dealerships near the Grand Traverse Mall. North of the intersection with 14th Street, the trunkline follows Division Street into Traverse City. From there it runs to the east of Grand Traverse Commons, the former Traverse City State Hospital, before US 31/M-37 meets Grandview Parkway next to the West Arm of the Grand Traverse Bay.

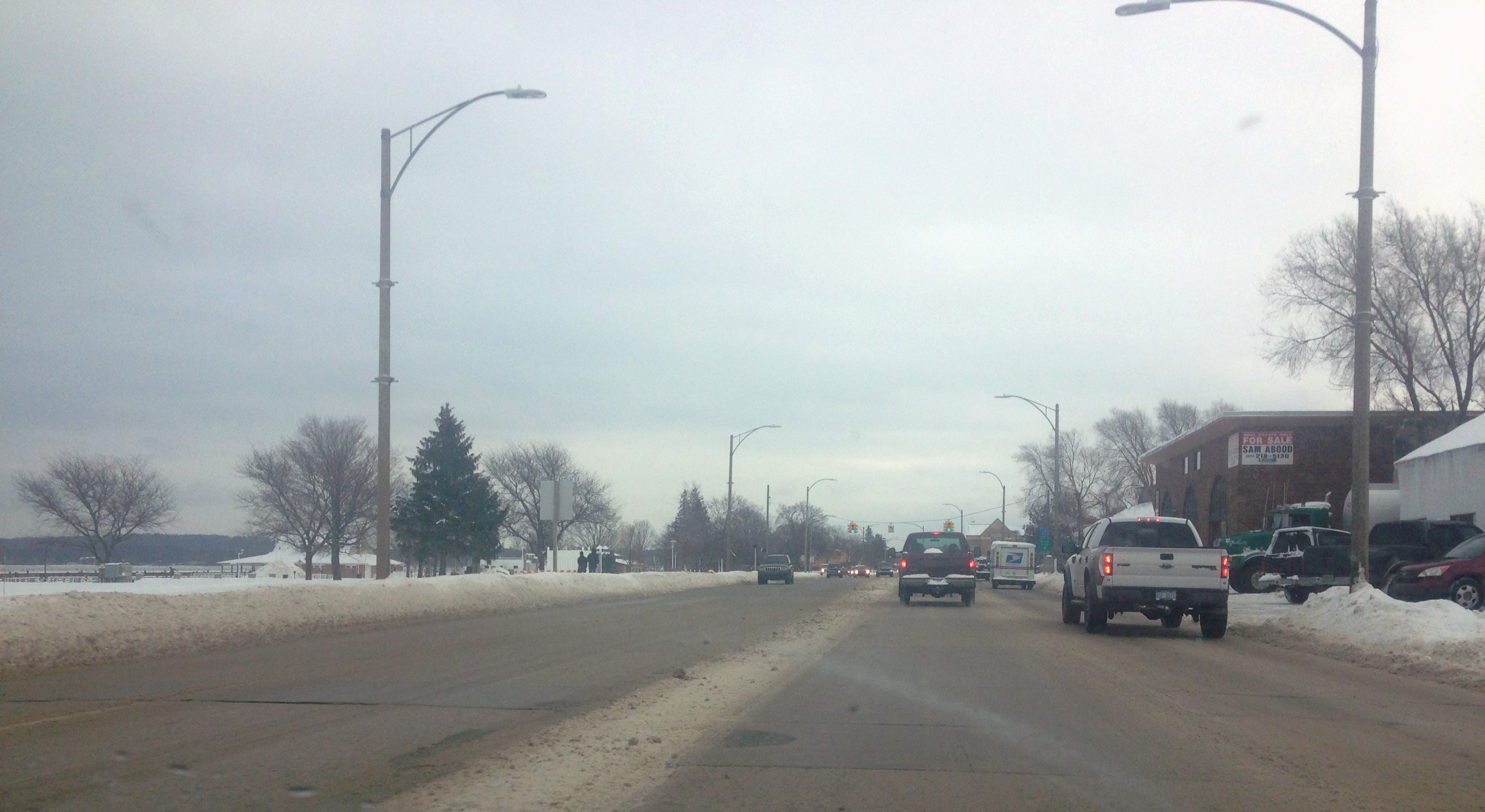
Grandview Parkway (US 31/M-37/M-72) in Traverse City

At that intersection, the trunkline meets the northern end of M-22, which is running concurrently with M-72 along the parkway. As US 31/M-37 turns east to run along the bay north of downtown, the highway merges with M-72 and picks up the LMCT again. Grandview Parkway runs between the Boardman River and the bay. Near the mouth of the river, US 31/M-37/M-72 turns to follow Front Street along the remainder of the bay's shoreline. At Garfield Avenue, M-37 turns northward to run up the Old Mission Peninsula, and US 31/M-72 continues across the base of the peninsula to the East Arm of the Grand Traverse Bay. The highway runs north of the Cherry Capital Airport near the east arm as it angles southeasterly to Traverse City State Park. East of the park, the trunkline exits suburban Traverse City and rounds the bay to run northward along its eastern shore. In the community of Acme, M-72 turns eastward while US 31 continues north past the Grand Traverse Resort.

About nine miles (14 km) north of Acme, US 31 crosses into Antrim County as it runs between Elk Lake and the Grand Traverse Bay. Between towns, the landscape is mostly agricultural lands with mixed patches of forest. A few miles north of the county line, the trunkline passes through Elk Rapids and crosses a channel connecting the Spencer Bay portion of Elk Lake to Lake Michigan. North of this crossing, US 31 continues northeasterly, running on an isthmus between Torch Lake and Grand Traverse Bay. The highway passes through Eastport at the northern end of Torch Lake and intersects the western end of M-88. Further north, US 31 runs through Atwood and crosses into Charlevoix County.

=== North to the Straits Area ===
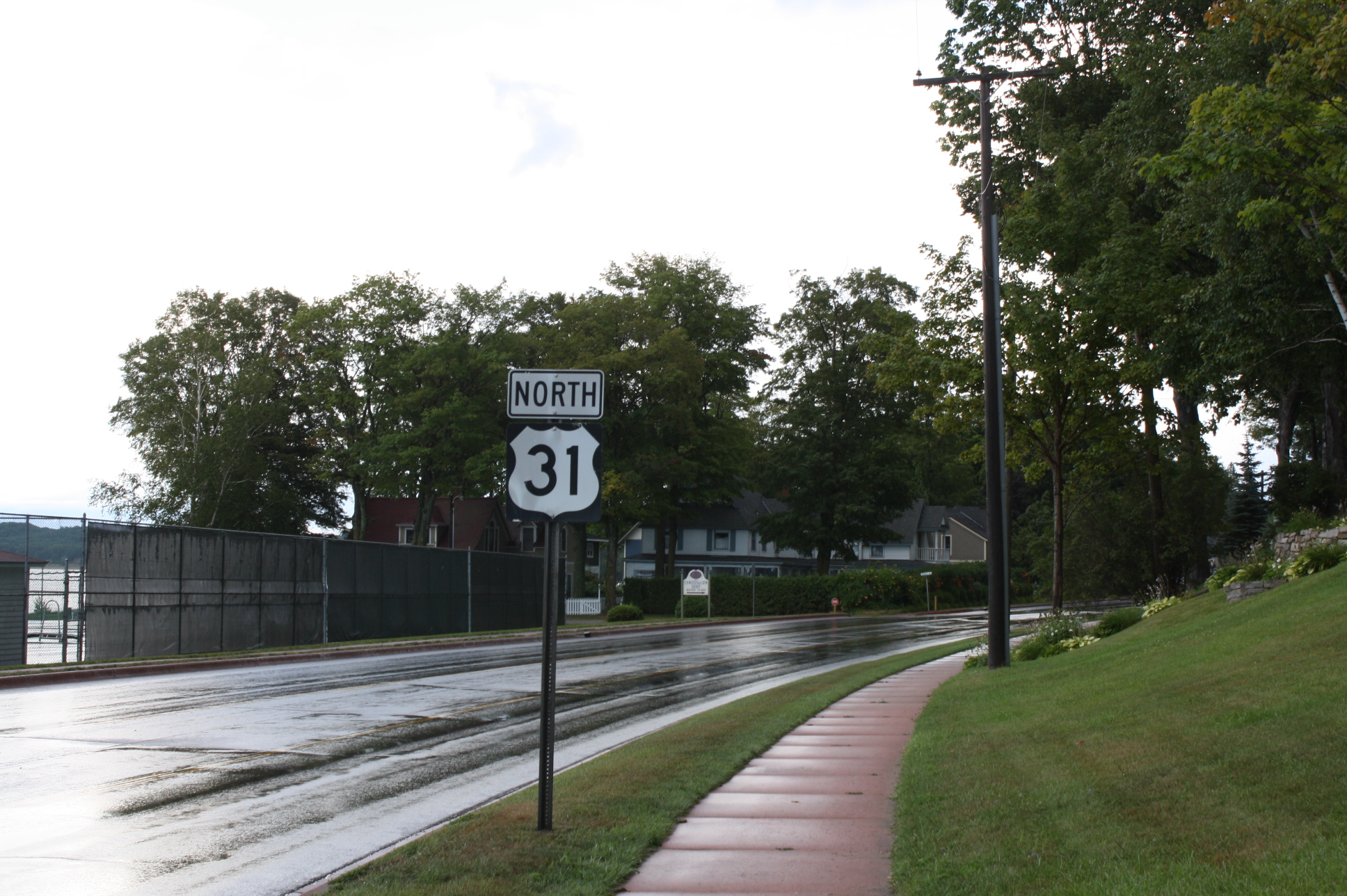
Passing through Bay View

As US 31 curves around to the northeast and east in Charlevoix County, it follows a section of the Lake Michigan shoreline that is not considered to be part of any bay. The highway continues through Northern Michigan agricultural areas to the southeast of Charlevoix. Once it enters the city, the trunkline intersects the northern end of M-66 and follows a series of city streets to a drawbridge over the channel that connects Lake Charlevoix to Lake Michigan. South of the structure it is Bridge Street, and north of the bridge it is Michigan Avenue. The highway turns eastward to exit town on Petoskey Avenue and follow the Lake Michigan shoreline. Near the community of Bay Shore, US 31 crosses into Emmet County. The trunkline continues past the Bay Harbor development on Charlevoix Avenue into the city of Petoskey.

Once in Petoskey, US 31 intersects the northern end of US 131 (Spring Street) and turns northward along Spring Street through downtown. The highway curves around to follow Mitchell Street to cross the Bear River and then follow Bay View Road. US 31 runs along the Little Traverse Bay through the eastern end of Petoskey and into Bay View. From there, it intersects the southern end of M-119 and passes through a pair of small towns, Conway and Oden, that border inland lakes like Round Lake and various bays of Crooked Lake.

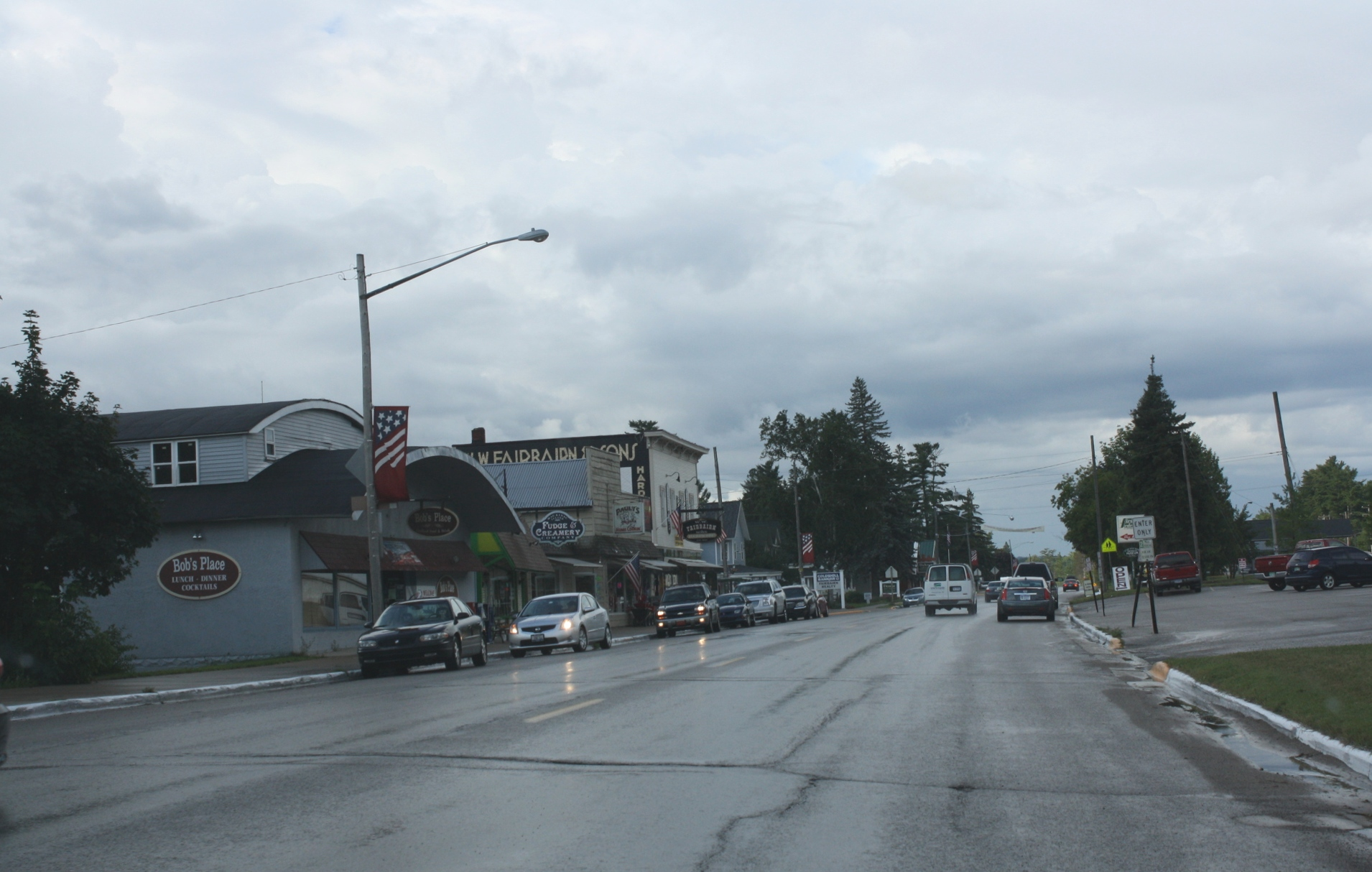
US 31 in Alanson

North of Oden, US 31 runs through Ponshewaing before entering the village of Alanson. There the highway intersects the western end of M-68 and runs parallel to the Crooked River, part of the Inland Waterway. North of town, US 31 runs through the town of Brutus before entering Pellston. The highway runs past the Pellston Regional Airport and continues due north to Levering. From there, US 31 turns northwesterly and then northeasterly on Mackinaw Highway to round Lake Paradise in the community of Carp Lake. North of the lake, US 31 follows a limited-access highway into Cheboygan County. Less than 1/2 mile (0.80 km) east of the county line, US 31 connects to I-75 in a partial interchange. At this interchange, northbound traffic defaults onto northbound I-75 and US 31 terminates.

== History ==
=== Predecessor highways ===
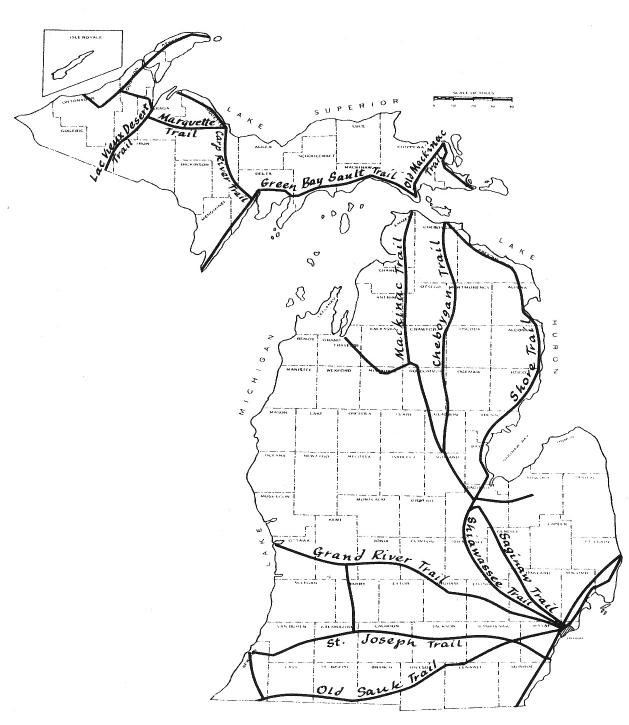
Map of the pre-statehood Indian trails

The first major overland transportation corridors in the future state of Michigan were the Indian trails. Only one of these followed part of the path of US 31; the Mackinac Trail roughly paralleled the route of US 31 from Petoskey northward.

In the age of the auto trail, the roads that later formed US 31 through Michigan were given a few different highway names. The West Michigan Lake Shore Highway Association was founded on January 10, 1912, and the group reorganized on May 30, 1913, as the West Michigan Pike Association. Their auto trail was marked by a series of concrete markers eight feet (2.4 m) tall along the 400-mile-long (640 km) roadway from the Indiana state line northward to Mackinaw City.

The highway was also a part of the Western Mainline of the Dixie Highway in Michigan, another auto trail that was built starting in 1915. In 1916, the northern junction between the West Michigan Pike and the East Michigan Pike, which served as the connection for the two mainlines of the Dixie Highway in Michigan in Mackinaw City, was marked with a stone monument at the junction of Central Avenue and Huron Street. By the middle of 1921, the trail used about 413 miles (665 km) of roadways along its western branch parallel to Lake Michigan. Michigan led all other states in the Dixie Highway Association by 1922 at improvements to its sections of the roadway.

The State Trunkline Highway System was created on May 13, 1913, by an act of the Michigan Legislature; at the time, one of the system's divisions corresponded to US 31. Division 5 followed a course from Niles northward to Mackinaw City. In 1919, the Michigan State Highway Department (MSHD) (Note: The Michigan State Highway Department was reorganized into the Michigan Department of State Highways and Transportation on August 23, 1973. The name was shortened to its current form in 1978.) signposted the highway system for the first time, and the future US 31 corridor was assigned two numbers. From the state line north through Niles to St. Joseph, it carried the original M-58 designation and from there northward it was the original M-11.

=== US Highway System era ===
The American Association of State Highway Officials (AASHO) approved the United States Numbered Highway System on November 11, 1926, and the MSHD designated US 31 in Michigan according to AASHO's plan to run northward from the Indiana state line and along the Lake Michigan shoreline to Mackinaw City. A section in the Benton Harbor–St. Joseph area overlapped US 12 and the modern concurrency with US 10 was also in place. By the end of the next year, the highway was extended across the Straits of Mackinac on the state car ferries to connect to US 2 in the Upper Peninsula north of St. Ignace. In 1930, Muskegon was bypassed; the new highway east of downtown was numbered US 31A.

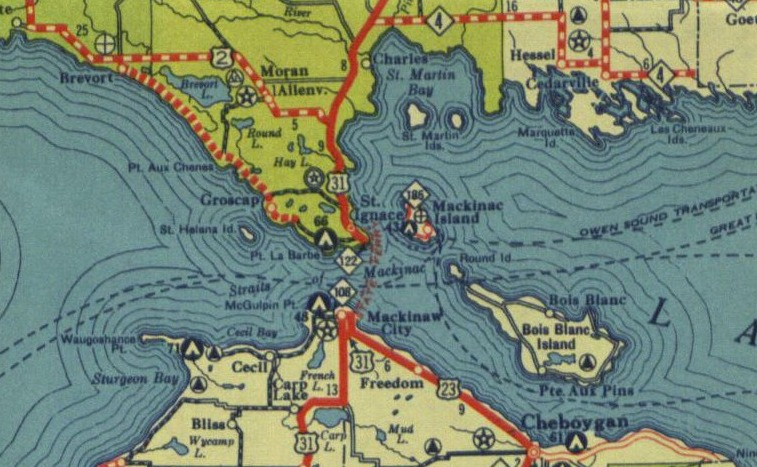
US 31 running in the Upper Peninsula in 1936

By the end of 1936, the last section of US 31 in the state was paved near Charlevoix, making the entire highway in Michigan a hard-surfaced road. Early the next year, the route of US 2 was realigned to run into St. Ignace; after the change, US 2 and US 31 ran concurrently. Later that year, a set of curves were straightened out south of Ludington and the routes of US 31 and a US 31A between Saugatuck and Holland were switched, and US 31 was realigned to bypass downtown Ludington.

In 1938, the southern end of US 31 was given a second designation when US 33 was extended into the state from Indiana to terminate in St. Joseph. Later that year, the US 31A in the Holland area was decommissioned. The next year, the US 31 concurrency was removed from US 2 in the Upper Peninsula and the former highway no longer crossed the Straits of Mackinac, terminating instead in Mackinaw City. By the early 1940, the Muskegon Bypass was given the US 31 designation, and the route downtown was redesignated US 31A.

During World War II, a bypass of downtown South Haven was built; the former route of US 31 through the heart of the city was designated Bus. US 31 at that time. After the war, the route of US 31 north of Charlevoix was realigned to follow the shoreline; this section opened by the middle of 1949. The route of the highway between Holland and West Olive was changed to run on a more angular course northwesterly in 1950. A few years later, a bypass to the south and east of Holland opened and the former route through down was redesignated as a business loop in 1954.

=== Freeway era ===
On November 1, 1957, the Mackinac Bridge opened to traffic. For the opening of the bridge, the highways coming into Mackinaw City from the south were realigned to connect to it; US 31 terminated at the southern approach to the Mackinac Bridge. In November 1960, sections of I-75's freeway opened from Indian River north to the southern Mackinac Bridge approaches, and US 31 was rerouted to follow segments of that freeway from the current northern terminus south of Mackinaw City northward. By the end of the decade, another freeway segment opened along the Muskegon Bypass as well. The next year, US 33 was extended northward along US 31 from St. Joseph for about 10 miles (16 km).

In 1962, a section of freeway along US 31 was opened between I-94 and the Berrien–Van Buren county line. This section was originally designated as part of I-96/US 31; the former route near the lakeshore became just US 33. The MSHD petitioned federal highway officials to switch the Interstate designations west of Grand Rapids, reversing the I-96 and I-196 numbers to their current configurations. After the designation switch was approved in 1963, an additional 35 miles (56 km) was opened from the northern end of the freeway near Benton Harbor to Holland as I-196/US 31. The freeway was also extended northward from Muskegon to the Muskegon–Oceana county line north of Montague in 1963.

When I-196 was completed between Holland and Grandville in 1974, the BL I-196 designation was applied along US 31 and Bus. US 31. (Note: BL I-196 diverged from US 31 to follow Bus. 31 through downtown on Washington, Michigan and Pine avenues plus the one-way pairing of 8th and 9th streets and Chicago Drive until 2004.) The next year, the US 31 freeway was extended northward into Oceana County to New Era. In 1976, this freeway was lengthened further to Hart. The section of I-196/US 31 in all but Berrien County was dedicated as the "Gerald R. Ford Freeway" in July 1978. Also that year, the US 31 freeway was extended to the southern side of Pentwater.

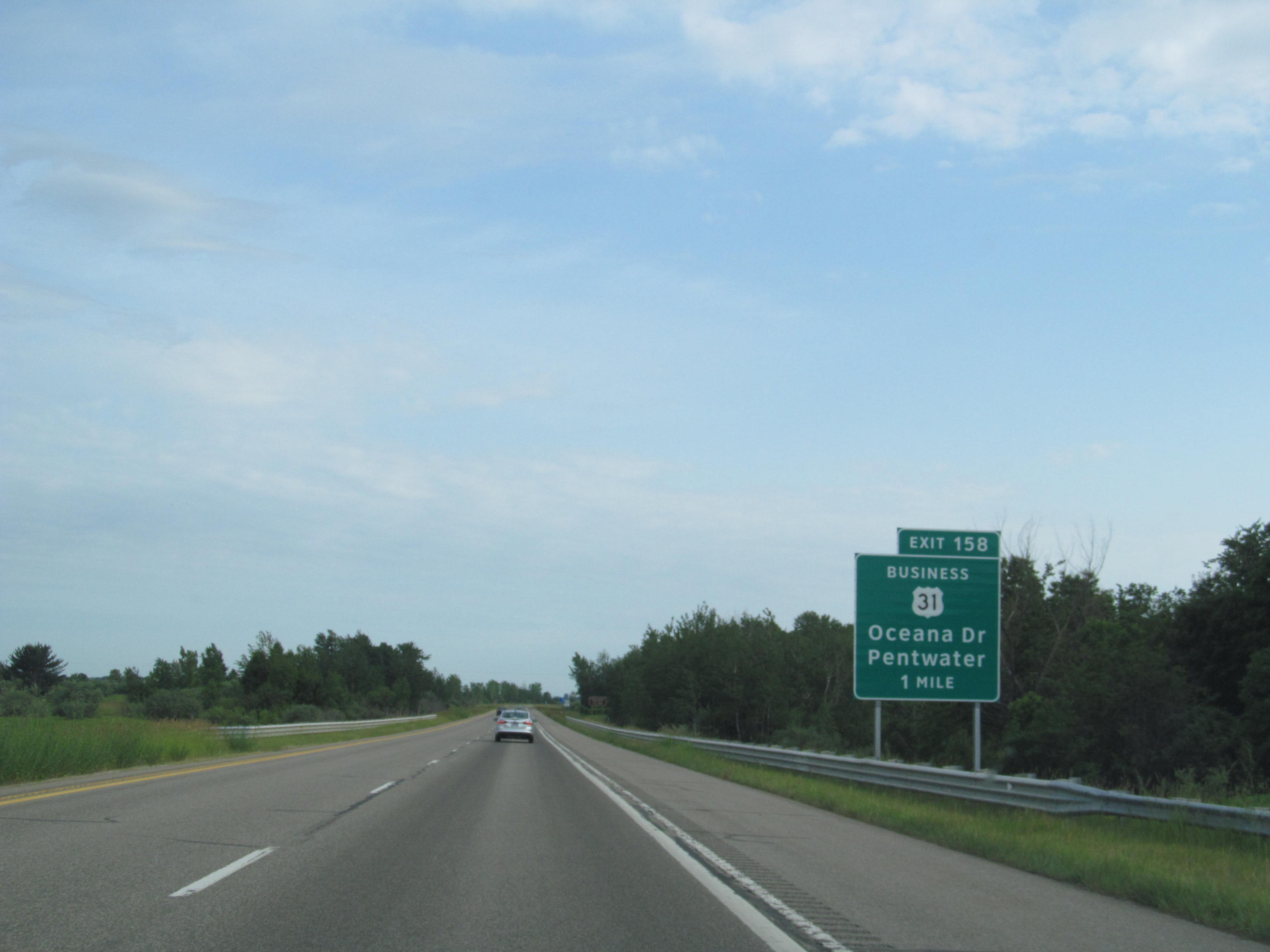
During the 1970s and 1980s, US 31 was converted into a freeway spawning business routes along the former route of the highway.

At the end of the 1970s and into the early 1990s, US 31 gained additional freeway segments on both ends of the highway. The first section of the St. Joseph Valley Parkway was completed in 1979 and ran from the Indiana state line north to US 12. The freeway was extended northward from Pentwater to the Oceana–Mason county line in 1980. Construction of the Niles Bypass was finished in 1987, bringing the parkway north to Walton Road northwest of Niles. Bus. US 31 was created along the former routing in Niles. The northern freeway was extended further into Mason County in two stages. In 1989, it was expanded to the south side of Ludington. The next year, Ludington was bypassed, completing the freeway to its current northern end at US 10 east of town. One more bypass, this time a non-freeway routing to the west of Scottville, opened in 1991. The Berrien Springs Bypass was completed in late 1992. Since then, MDOT built a 9.5-mile (15.3 km) freeway segment north from Berrien Springs to Napier Avenue that was opened on August 27, 2003, at a cost of $97 million (equivalent to $158 million in 2024). The last change to the routing of US 31 occurred in August 2004 when the route of Bus. US 31 in Holland was turned back to local control; BL I-196 was rerouted to follow US 31 around downtown instead of following the former business loop through it.

Starting in 1996, Traverse City-area residents and tourists requested a freeway bypass the city. These residents decided to not build the highway. In 2001, The idea was revived, but MDOT abandoned these plans in June of that year.

=== Completion of the St. Joseph Valley Parkway ===
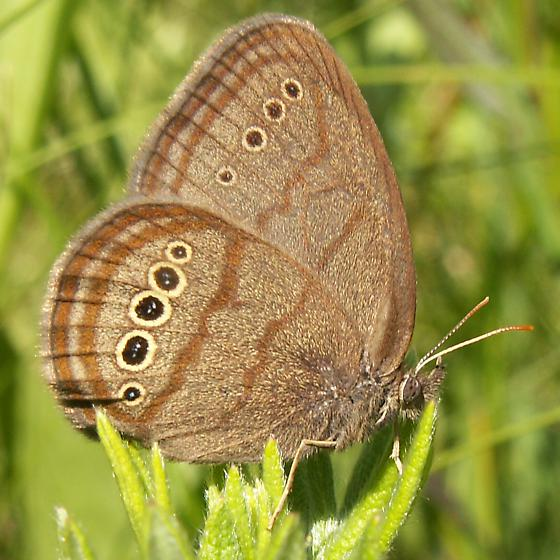
Mitchell's satyr butterfly, which has habitat near US 31

The MSHD started studies for a freeway routing of US 31 from the state line northward to I-94 in 1967. The first section northward to Niles was approved in 1972, and the remainder of the route was approved in 1981. Since then, MDOT re-evaluated the St. Joseph Valley Parkway extension east of Benton Harbor, due to environmental, economic, and historical site issues. One of the environmental concerns that was studied relates to the habitat of an endangered species, the Mitchell's satyr butterfly, which has its habitat in the area of the proposed freeway. The 40-acre (16 ha) habitat is home to the second-largest population of the rare butterfly. The freeway between Niles and Benton Harbor was planned as a series of five segments when approved in 1981. Since that approval, the butterfly was discovered in the Blue Creek Fen in the late 1980s, and it was listed as an endangered species in 1992. This listing stalled MDOT's planning and construction of the fifth freeway segment north of Berrien Springs. The United States Fish and Wildlife Service (USFWS) issued an opinion two years later that the project would jeopardize the species. MDOT was given permission to modify the previously approved freeway to cross the Blue Creek on longer bridges; the USFWS also required that any construction be done from elevated platforms, among other restrictions. In the interim, MDOT proceeded with construction of the southern portion of the last freeway segment, completing it northward from Berrien Springs to the Napier Avenue interchange in August 2003.

A revised environmental impact study to account for the butterfly's habitat in the northern area of the freeway was approved in 2004. The study compared the original routing for this extension that involved connecting directly to I-196 at I-94 with an alternate route that involved an indirect connection via the BL I-94 interchange near Benton Harbor, converting it to be to a cloverleaf interchange, and adding additional lanes to the resulting I-94 concurrency. The study recommended using a version of the alternate connection to avoid the Blue Creek Fen, both to save money and decrease impact to the Mitchell's satyr. At the time the freeway segment opened in 2003, MDOT expected the remaining segment would not take much longer to complete, but since then, funding has not been available. MDOT did not include construction of the extension for this reason in the department's 2014–18 highway projects plan released in 2013, although most of the design work and land acquisition had been completed. Until the missing freeway segment was built, US 31 followed a stretch of Napier Avenue, which was upgraded in conjunction with the St. Joseph Valley Parkway opening to that point, westward to I-94. MDOT's 2017–21 plan draft released in July 2016 split the remaining work into three phases. The department listed funding for only the first two of these three phases, with construction anticipated to start in 2021.

On December 6, 2018, MDOT announced that a $20 million discretionary grant had been received to complete the final phase of construction, building the last two miles (3.2 km) of freeway required to connect US 31 to I-94. In 2020, work began on the final link of the St. Joseph Valley Parkway to connect the US 31 freeway to I-94 east of Benton Harbor. The project cost $121.5 million dollars and involved relocating the interchange with the eastern terminus of BL I-94 and reconstructing 3.5 miles (5.6 km) of I-94 in the area. Work on that interchange started in September 2020. US 31 was rerouted to follow its new freeway section for 1.8 miles (2.9 km) from the previous end of the freeway at Napier Avenue that opened in 2003 to I-94 at BL I-94, where US 31 then followed I-94 to the I-196 interchange as before. This new routing opened on November 9, 2022.

== Future ==
As of 2014, travelers had to use either US 31 through Grand Haven or 68th Avenue through Eastmanville to cross the Grand River in Ottawa County. A new highway, part of a long-range plan to build a US 31 bypass of Grand Haven, provides a river crossing almost equidistant between the two, greatly reducing drive times between areas north and south of the river. A drive from Nunica to Robinson is a 20-mile (32 km) trip; the new highway provides a route closer to seven miles (11 km) in length. Called M-231, this highway is a scaled-down bypass of US 31 through Grand Haven, even though it will not physically connect to US 31. (Note: The final environmental impact study (FEIS) for the US 31 Holland to Grand Haven project only approved the M-231 highway as a two-lane limited access road because the additional lanes for a full freeway were judged to be unnecessary during the 20-year timespan covered by the FEIS. The study did consider alternatives that would have involved relocating US 31 to the new corridor without the intermediate M-231 stage.) By January 4, 2013, MDOT had completed work for this highway, including a bridge over North Cedar Drive, additional ramps at the I-96 and M-104 interchange, and reconstruction and widening of M-104 near I-96. The department had also completed a reconfiguration of the intersection between M-104 and Cleveland Drive and widening the bridge that carries M-104 over I-96. The expected date of completion for M-231 was set for sometime in 2016 pending funding availability. MDOT planned to build 1.4 miles (2.3 km) of the new highway starting in 2013, including the bridges over the Grand River and Little Robinson Creek. The 2005 SAFETEA-LU transportation bill provided funding earmarked for the project by US Representative Pete Hoekstra from Holland as well as matching funds from the state's Michigan Jobs Today program. The total cost of the project was expected to be near $150 million. On October 30, 2015, the highway opened to traffic.

== Memorial designations and tourist routes ==
Markers for the Lake Michigan Circle Tour and a Pure Michigan Byway

The sections of the route of US 31 in Michigan has been dedicated several times to various organizations. The route of US 33 in the state, which at the time was concurrent with US 31, was dedicated as the Blue & Gray Trail in 1938 to honor veterans of the American Civil War. The Blue Star Memorial Highway designation was applied to the highway to honor those serving in the military. The designation was dedicated on October 10, 1948, by the State Highway Commissioner Charles Ziegler.

In 1917, the Upper Peninsula Development Bureau created a tourist route that is a predecessor of the modern Great Lakes Circle Tours (GLCT). The Great Lakes Automobile Route was a series of roads on both the Upper and Lower peninsulas of Michigan. It included US 31 between Manistee and the Benton Harbor–St. Joseph area. The concept did not last a year; the American entry into World War I and a lack of focus on a single route consigned the idea into obscurity. The idea of a tourist route around the Great Lakes was revived in 1986 as a pet project of Michigan First Lady Paula Blanchard. MDOT and its counterparts in Wisconsin, Minnesota and Ontario created the GLCT scheme which includes the LMCT that follows US 31 from Lake Michigan Beach northward to Manistee and from Traverse City north to the terminus near Mackinaw City excluding locations where business loops run closer to the lake at South Haven, Muskegon, and Whitehall–Montague.

A group of area residents initiated an effort to have the former West Michigan Pike designated what is now called a Pure Michigan Byway. The designation would prioritize the area for historic preservation grants. A Preserve America grant funded a survey from June 2007 through September 2010, the results of which were a set of reports through the Michigan State Historic Preservation Office on the historical nature of the West Michigan Pike. In 2011, the group was in the process of securing resolutions from municipalities along the highway in support of the designation. According to officials working on the byway, it can take up to seven years to complete the process. The initial proposals had the byway continuing to Mackinaw City, but as approved in 2016, it runs from New Buffalo on I-94 to Ludington, following US 31 except between business loops at South Haven, Muskegon, Whitehall–Montague and Pentwater. The byway designation was moved out of the village of Pentwater in May 2023 when that business loop was removed from the highway system.

== Historic bridges ==
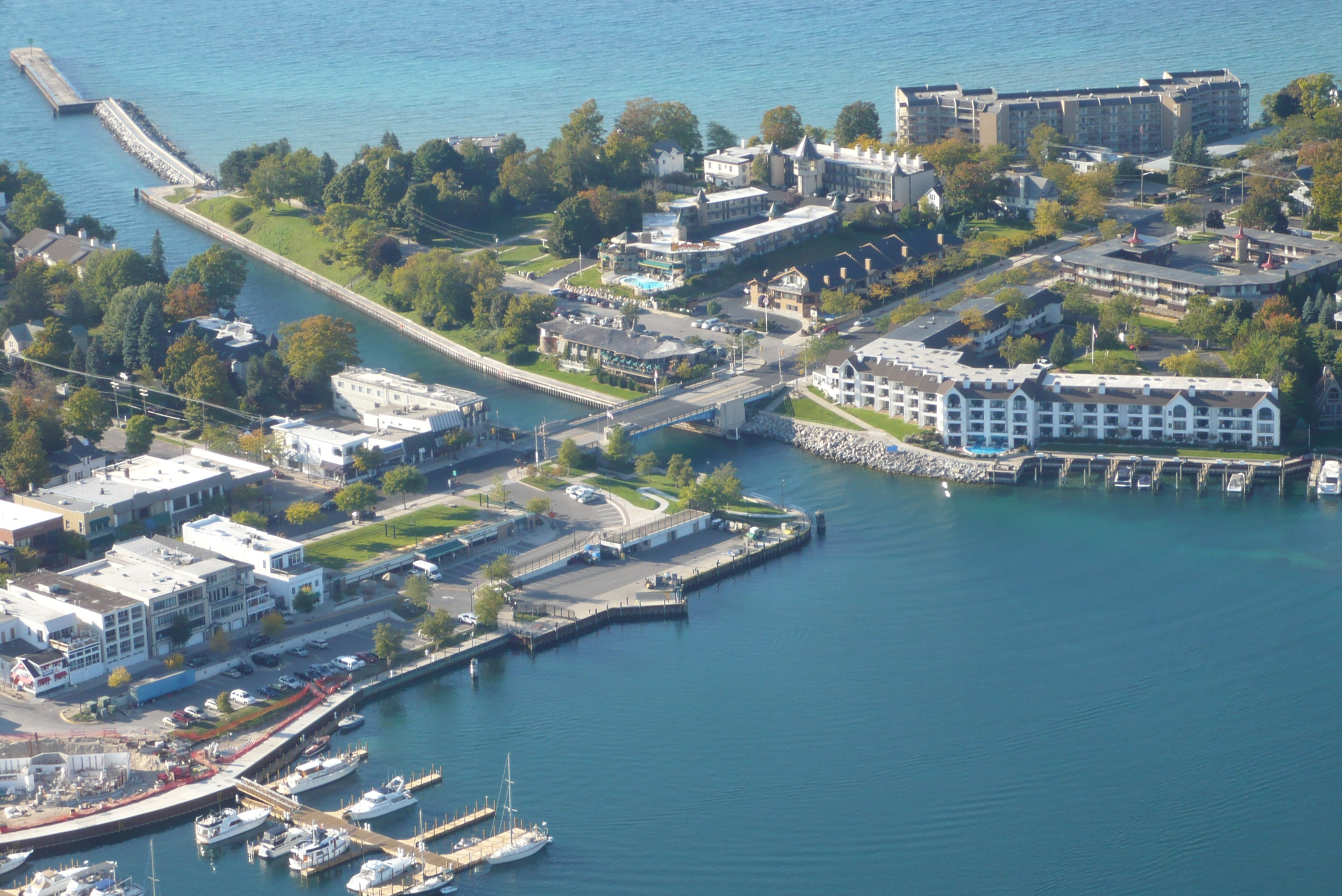
Bridge over the Island Lake Outlet, Charlevoix

MDOT maintains a listing of the historic bridges in the state; along US 31, the department has listed four structures. In downtown Charlevoix, the US-31–Island Lake Outlet Bridge carries the highway over a channel dredged between Lake Michigan and Round Lake that also connects to Lake Charlevoix. Built from 1947 through 1949, it is the fifth bridge at the location. It is a double-leaf bascule bridge. In Petoskey, the highway crosses Bear Creek on a concrete girder bridge built in 1930. At 265 feet (81 m) in length, it is the fourth longest such bridge in Michigan. In Manistee, the Manistee River is spanned by a double-leaf bascule bridge built in 1933. North of Hart in Pentwater Township, the 270-foot-long (82 m) US 31–Pentwater River Bridge is a long-span steel bridge that crosses the Pentwater River. It was listed on the National Register of Historic Places on December 20, 1999. It carries Oceana Drive along a former routing of US 31.

== Major intersections ==
County	Location	mi	km	Exit	Destinations	Notes
Berrien	Bertrand Township	0.000	0.000		US 31 south (St. Joseph Valley Parkway) – South Bend, Indianapolis	Indiana state line
Berrien	Bertrand Township	3.287	5.290	3	US 12 – Niles, Sturgis, New Buffalo	
Berrien	Bertrand Township	4.852	7.809	5	Niles–Buchanan Road	
Berrien	Bertrand Township	6.777	10.907	7	Walton Road	Former Bus. US 31
Berrien	Oronoko Township	12.987	20.901	13	Snow Road	
Berrien	Oronoko Township	15.474	24.903	15	M-139 – Benton Harbor, Berrien Springs	Signed northbound as exits 15A (south) and 15B (north)
Berrien	Berrien Township	18.080	29.097	18	Tabor Road – Eau Claire	
Berrien	Sodus Township	21.938	35.306	22	Pipestone Road – Eau Claire	Indirect access to Pipestone Road via Sodus Parkway
Berrien	Benton Township	24.441	39.334	24	Napier Avenue	
Berrien	Benton Township	26.884	43.266	27	I-94 west – Chicago BL I-94 west – Benton Harbor	Southern end of I-94 concurrency; eastern terminus of BL I-94; signed as exit 33 southbound
Berrien	Benton Township	28.654– 28.677	46.114– 46.151	34	I-94 east – Detroit I-196 north – Holland, Grand Rapids	Northern end of I-94 concurrency; southern end of I-196 concurrency
Berrien	Benton Township	29.728	47.843	1	Red Arrow Highway	
Berrien	Hagar Township	32.354	52.069	4	Coloma, Riverside	Connects to Coloma Road
Berrien	Hagar Township	35.453	57.056	7	M-63 south (Hagar Shore Road) / LMCT south – Benton Harbor, St. Joseph	Southern end of LMCT concurrency; northern terminus of M-63; LMCT, Benton Harbor and St. Joseph not signed northbound; Hagar Shore Road not signed southbound
Van Buren	Covert Township	41.301	66.468	13	Covert	Connects to 32nd Avenue
Van Buren	South Haven Township	46.249	74.431	18	BL I-196 north / LMCT north to M-43 – South Haven, Bangor M-140 south – Watervliet	Northern end of LMCT concurrency; northern terminus of M-140, southern terminus of BL I-196; northbound signage omits Watervliet; signed only as M-140 – Watervliet southbound
Van Buren	South Haven	49.060	78.954	20	BL I-196 south / LMCT south to M-43 (Phoenix Street) – South Haven, Bangor	Southern end of LMCT concurrency; signed only as Phoenix Street northbound; northern terminus of BL I-196; signed as exits 20A (east) and 20B (west) northbound
Allegan	Casco Township	50.643	81.502	22	North Shore Drive	
Allegan	Casco Township	54.986	88.491	26	109th Avenue – Pullman	
Allegan	Ganges Township	58.247	93.739	30	A-2 – Glenn, Ganges	Ganges signed northbound only
Allegan	Ganges–Saugatuck township line	62.599	100.743	34	M-89 east – Fennville	Western terminus of M-89
Allegan	Saugatuck Township	64.788	104.266	36	A-2 – Douglas, Saugatuck, Ganges	Douglas and Saugatuck signed northbound only; Ganges signed southbound only
Allegan	Laketown Township	69.602	112.014	41	A-2 (Blue Star Highway) – Saugatuck, Douglas	Blue Star Highway signed northbound only; Saugatuck and Douglas signed southbound only
Allegan	Laketown Township	73.172	117.759	44	I-196 east (G.R. Ford Freeway) – Grand Rapids BL I-196 east – Holland	Northern end of I-196 concurrency; southern end of BL I-196 concurrency; northbound exit and southbound entrance
Allegan	Holland	75.185– 75.462	120.999– 121.444	47	A-2 south (Blue Star Highway); Washington Avenue – Holland	Former Bus. US 31; signed as exits 47A (A-2) and 47B (Washington Avenue); northern terminus of A-2
Allegan	Holland	76.054	122.397	Northern end of freeway		
Allegan	Holland	76.585	123.252		M-40 south – Allegan	Northern terminus of M-40
Ottawa	Holland Township	79.364– 79.378	127.724– 127.747	—	BL I-196 east (Chicago Drive)	Northern end of BL I-196 concurrency; interchange
Ottawa	Holland Township	79.973	128.704	—	Lakewood Boulevard	Interchange
Ottawa	Grand Haven Township	92.570	148.977		M-45 east (Lake Michigan Drive) – Grand Rapids	Western terminus of M-45
Ottawa	Ferrysburg	100.215	161.280	104A	M-104 east – Spring Lake	Northbound entrance via unsigned Connector 104 and exit 104B; southern end of freeway; western terminus of M-104
Ottawa	Ferrysburg	100.480	161.707	104B	Ferrysburg	Southbound entrance via exit 104A; connects to Third Street (unsigned Connector 104)
Ottawa	Ferrysburg–Spring Lake Township line	101.622	163.545	105	Van Wagoner Street	
Muskegon	Norton Shores	104.150	167.613	107	Pontaluna Road – Fruitport	
Muskegon	Norton Shores	105.661	170.045	109	Sternberg Road – Fruitport	Signed as exits 109A (east) and 109B (west)
Muskegon	Norton Shores	106.907– 107.021	172.050– 172.234	110	I-96 east – Grand Rapids Bus. US 31 north / LMCT north – Muskegon; Airline Road – Norton Shores	Northern end of LMCT concurrency; signed as exits 110A (I-96 east) both directions; 110B signed as Bus. US 31 northbound and Airline Road southbound; western terminus of I-96; I-96 exit 1; exit 110A connects to Hile Road northbound
Muskegon	Muskegon–Norton Shores–Fruitport Township tripoint	109.230	175.789	112	B-72 east (Sherman Boulevard) – Muskegon, Rockford	Western terminus of B-72
Muskegon	Muskegon–Muskegon Township line	110.230	177.398	113	Laketon Avenue – Muskegon	
Muskegon	Muskegon–Muskegon Township line	111.246	179.033	114	M-46 – Muskegon, Cedar Springs	
Muskegon	Muskegon Township	112.853	181.619	116	Bus. US 31 south / LMCT south – Muskegon	Southern end of LMCT concurrency; signed northbound as North Muskegon; northern terminus of Bus. US 31
Muskegon	North Muskegon	115.335	185.614	118	M-120 – Fremont	
Muskegon	Dalton Township	117.926	189.784	121	B-23 north (Russell Road) – Lakewood Club	Access to Michigan's Adventure, Owasippe Scout Reservation, and Blue Lake Fine Arts Camp; southern terminus of B-23
Muskegon	Fruitland–Whitehall township line	122.874	197.747	126	White Lake Drive – Lakewood Club	
Muskegon	Whitehall Township	125.423	201.849	128	Bus. US 31 north / LMCT north – Whitehall	Northern end of LMCT concurrency; southern terminus of Bus. US 31
Muskegon	Montague Township	128.127	206.200	131	Bus. US 31 south / LMCT south – Montague B-86 east B-15 north	Southern end of LMCT concurrency; northern terminus of Bus. US 31, southern terminus of B-15, and western terminus of B-86
Oceana	Grant Township	133.365	214.630	136	Winston Road – Rothbury	
Oceana	Grant–Shelby township line	137.169	220.752	140	M-20 east (Stony Lake Road) – New Era	Western terminus of M-20
Oceana	Shelby Township	140.841	226.662	144	Shelby Road – Shelby	
Oceana	Hart	146.471	235.722	149	Hart, Mears	Former Bus. US 31
Oceana	Weare Township	151.616	244.002	154	Monroe Road – Pentwater	Former Bus. US 31
Oceana	Weare–Pentwater township line	155.764	250.678	158	Oceana Drive – Pentwater	Former Bus. US 31
Mason	Pere Marquette Township	163.528	263.173	166	Bus. US 31 north (Pere Marquette Highway) – Ludington	Southern terminus of Bus. US 31
Mason	Amber Township	166.890	268.583	170	US 10 west – Ludington	Western end of US 10 concurrency; signed as exits 170A (east) and 170B (west); northern end of freeway
Mason	Amber Township	171.502	276.006		US 10 east – Scottville, Reed City	Eastern end of US 10 concurrency
Manistee	Manistee Township	194.732	313.391		M-55 east – Cadillac	Western terminus of M-55
Manistee	Manistee Township	197.814	318.351		M-22 north / LMCT north – Onekama, Frankfort	Northern end of LMCT concurrency
Benzie	Joyfield Township	221.557	356.561		M-115 east – Mesick	Southern end of M-115 concurrency
Benzie	Benzonia	223.832	360.223		M-115 west – Frankfort	Northern end of M-115 concurrency
Grand Traverse	Interlochen	242.625	390.467		South Long Lake Road – Interlochen State Park	Former northern terminus of M-137
Grand Traverse	Chums Corners	248.357	399.692		M-37 south – Grand Rapids	Southern end of M-37 concurrency
Grand Traverse	Traverse City	255.295	410.857		M-22 north / M-72 west (Grandview Parkway) / LMCT south – Empire, Northport	Western end of M-72 concurrency; southern end of LMCT concurrency; northern terminus of M-22
Grand Traverse	Traverse City	257.280	414.052		M-37 north	Northern end of M-37 concurrency
Grand Traverse	Acme	262.962	423.196		M-72 east – Kalkaska, Grayling	Eastern end of M-72 concurrency
Antrim	Torch Lake Township	288.289	463.956		M-88 east – Mancelona	Western terminus of M-88
Antrim	Banks Township	293.786	472.803		C-48 east (Atwood Road) – Ellsworth	Western terminus of C-48
Charlevoix	Charlevoix	304.237	489.622		C-65 south (Marion Center Road) – Ellsworth	Northern terminus of C-65
Charlevoix	Charlevoix	304.438	489.945		M-66 south – East Jordan	Northern terminus of M-66
Charlevoix	Charlevoix Township	307.438	494.774		C-56 east (Boyne City Road)	Western terminus of C-56
Emmet	Petoskey	321.463	517.345		US 131 south – Kalkaska, Cadillac	Northern terminus of US 131
Emmet	Petoskey	322.189	518.513		C-58 east (Mitchell Road, Wolverine Road) C-81 south	Western terminus of C-58 and northern terminus of C-81
Emmet	Bear Creek Township	324.849	522.794		M-119 north (Harbor–Petoskey Road) – Harbor Springs	Southern terminus of M-119
Emmet	Alanson	333.107	536.084		M-68 east – Indian River	Western terminus of M-68
Emmet	Pellston	340.523	548.019		C-64 east (Robinson Road)	Western terminus of C-64
Emmet	Levering	346.235– 346.485	557.211– 557.614		C-66 (Levering Road) – Cheboygan, Cross Village	Short concurrency with C-66
Cheboygan	Mackinaw Township	354.346– 355.179	570.265– 571.605		I-75 north / LMCT north – Mackinac Bridge	Northern terminus of US 31; northern end of LMCT concurrency; southbound exit and northbound entrance; exit 336 on I-75
1.000 mi = 1.609 km; 1.000 km = 0.621 mi: Concurrency terminus; Incomplete access

== See also ==
- Business routes of U.S. Route 31 in Michigan

== Notes ==
US Highway 31
Previous state: Indiana	Michigan	Next state: Terminus
