= A-2 (Michigan county highway) =

County road in Michigan

A-2
- Blue Star Highway
- A-2 highlighted in red

Route information
- Maintained by BCRC, VBCRC, and ACRC
- Length: 41.609 mi (66.963 km)
- Existed: c. May 5, 1970–present

Major junctions
- South end: M-63 near Lake Michigan Beach
- M-43 in South Haven; M-89 in Ganges Township; I-196 near Saugatuck
- North end: BL I-196 / US 31 in Holland

Location
- Country: United States
- State: Michigan
- Counties: Berrien, Van Buren, Allegan

Highway system
- County-Designated Highways
← H-63	→ A-37

A-2 is a county-designated highway in the US state of Michigan running about 42 miles (68 km) along the shores of Lake Michigan in the southwestern part of the Lower Peninsula. The county highway starts near the town of Lake Michigan Beach in Berrien County at an intersection with M-63 and follows Blue Star Highway through rural coastal areas. Running roughly parallel to its modern freeway replacement, Interstate 196 (I-196), A-2 passes through the cities of South Haven and Saugatuck before ending at an interchange with Business Loop Interstate 196/US Highway 31 (BL I-196/US 31) in Holland.

In the early part of the 20th century, what is now Blue Star Highway was part of two auto trails before becoming a state trunkline highway. In 1926, it was designated as a part of US 31 and kept that status until I-196 bypassed the roadway in the early 1960s. Two local business owners spurred the efforts to get the older highway restored to the state highway map in 1970, and the A-2 designation was created as a result.

== Route description ==
A-2 starts at an intersection with M-63 about 1,000 feet (300 m) west of the I-196/US 31 freeway in Lake Michigan Beach. From this intersection, the county highway runs northward through forest between Lake Michigan and the freeway in northern Berrien County. A-2 crosses into Van Buren County about a mile (1.6 km) later and continues winding north-northeasterly. At various locations, local roads connect the county road to interchanges with the freeway as the two run roughly parallel together. Blue Star Highway passes the Palisades Nuclear Generating Station near Covert before coming into the southern edge of South Haven.

In South Haven, A-2 bypasses downtown, rounding the district to the south and east. The county road intersects BL I-196 at Le Grange Street due south of downtown and M-43 a block later. In this area, Blue Star Highway is bounded by a mix of mostly commercial and some residential properties. On the north side of the city, A-2 intersects BL I-196 a second time at Phoenix Street and then continues due north out of town, crossing the Black River. The landscape transitions over to a rural forest area with residential properties as A-2 continues across the county line into Allegan County and passes the South Haven Country Club and some vineyards.

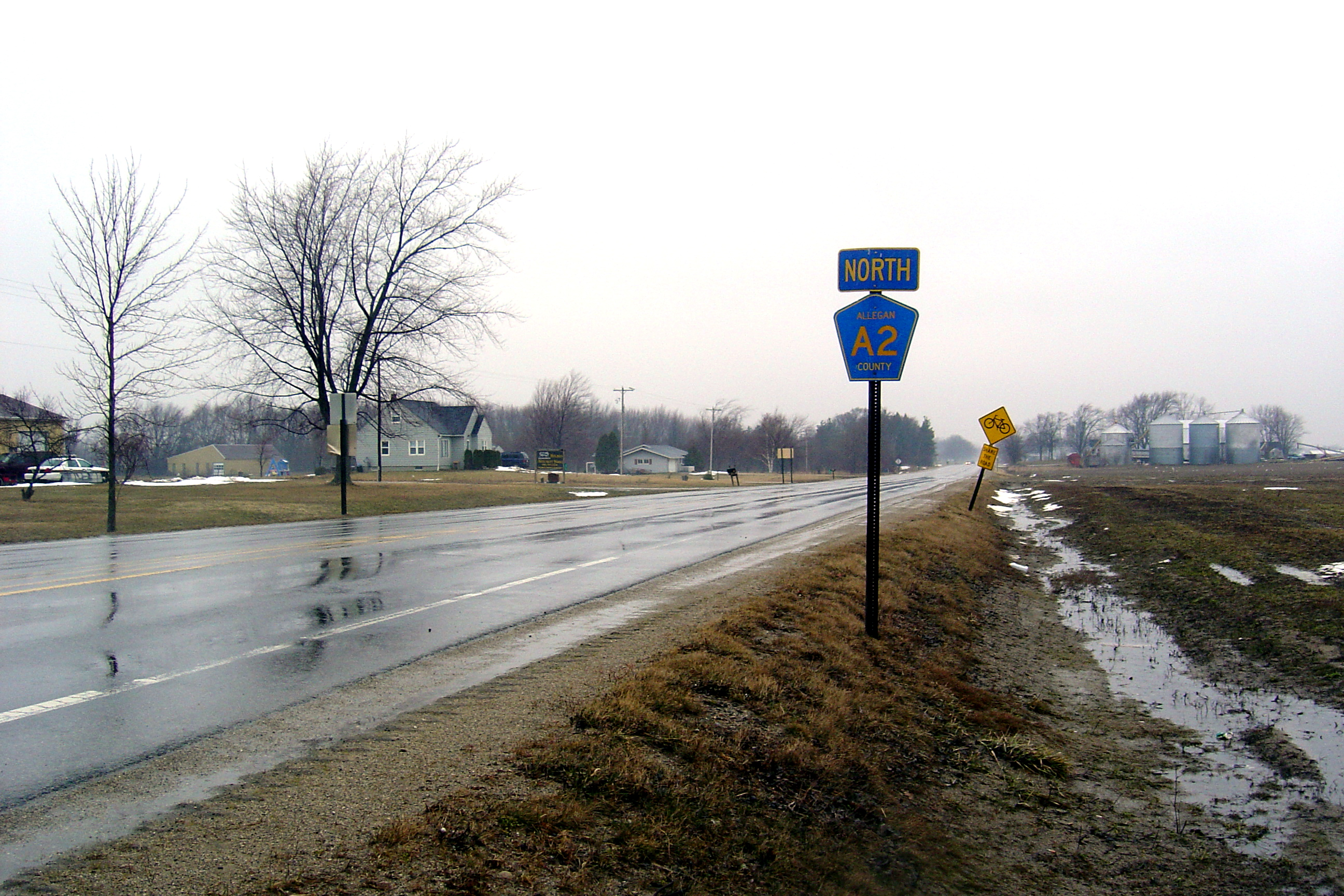
A-2 in Allegan County

A-2 turns northeasterly near Glenn and crosses over I-196/US 31 to run east of the freeway. Blue Star Highway here follows 68th Street in the county road grid through the community of Ganges. North of the community, A-2 intersects M-89 about 1,400 feet (430 m) east of its terminus at I-196/US 31. North of here, the freeway turns to the northeast and crosses under A-2. Blue Star Highway continues due north into Douglas. In the city, the county road is bounded by businesses as it S-curves northeasterly to cross a narrow spot of Kalamazoo Lake (part of the Kalamazoo River) into Saugatuck. A-2 bypasses downtown Saugatuck to its east and continues north and northeasterly out of town. The county road crosses over the freeway again and out to farmlands before turning north along 58th Street, well inland of I-196/US 31.

From here, A-2 runs due north and crosses I-196 one last time near the south side of the West Michigan Regional Airport; this crossing has no interchange. The county road passes under the west end of the airport's runway in a tunnel as it meanders along South Washington Avenue to an interchange with BL I-196/US 31 on the south side of the city of Holland where it terminates. South Washington Street continues northward into downtown without the county highway designation. As a county-designated highway, the 41.6-mile (66.9 km) length of A-2 is maintained by the Berrien, Van Buren, and Allegan county road commissions (BCRC, VBCRC, ACRC) in their respective counties.

== History ==
When auto trails were being developed in the early 20th century, the path of the modern A-2 was used for part of two. The first in 1912 was the West Michigan Pike, which ran from the Indiana state line north to the Straits of Mackinac along Lake Michigan. The second was the Western Mainline of the Dixie Highway in 1915. The state legislature created the State Trunkline Highway System on May 13, 1913, and in the legislation, Division 5 corresponded to a highway along the western Lower Peninsula near Lake Michigan. Six years later, the system was signposted for the first time, and the original M-11 ran along the former Division 5. In November 1926, the American Association of State Highway Officials approved the United States Numbered Highway System, and the state designated US 31 in Michigan along M-11. During World War II, the state highway department bypassed downtown South Haven, shifting US 31 out of downtown. US 31 was given the Blue Star Highway designation on October 10, 1948.

US 31 between the Benton Harbor and Holland areas was slated to become an Interstate Highway when that system debuted in the late 1950s. The first freeway segment in the area opened in 1962 northward from I-94 to near the Berrien–Van Buren county line, and an additional 35 miles (56 km) opened the next year from the northern end of the freeway near the county line to Holland as I-196; US 31 was removed from Blue Star Highway to run along the new freeway.

Blue Star Highway was returned to county control, the US 31 highway signs were taken down, and the roadway was removed from the state highway maps with the completion of the freeway in the area. The owners of a motel in Saugatuck, Mr. and Mrs. Howard "Gene" Temple, received a large number of cancellations because travelers could not find their business. Mrs. Temple said that signage in the area was misleading, and she contacted local officials to get better highway signage for the road. These meetings resulted in a test program for the 1970 state highway map that marked Blue Star Highway as A-2; the Allegan County Road Commission spent $2,000 (equivalent to $12,100 in 2023) to erect about 50 markers along the road in their county. At the time, the scheme was labeled "experimental". Later that year, the system was expanded in scope to the rest of the state. Mrs. Temple was credited as the first Michigan woman to secure a highway designation from the State Highway Commission.

The next year in 1971, A-2 was extended south to the junction with US 33 (now M-63) in Lake Michigan Beach. In 1972, BL I-196 in South Haven was realigned and no longer overlapped A-2. The South Washington Avenue section of A-2 on the south side of Holland was realigned in 2004 into a 885-foot-long (270 m) tunnel to make way for an expansion of the runway at Tulip City Airport (now West Michigan Regional Airport). A roundabout was added at the intersection with North Shore Drive north of South Haven in 2010.

== Major intersections ==
County	Location	mi	km	Destinations	Notes
Berrien	Lake Michigan Beach	0.000	0.000	M-63 / LMCT – Benton Harbor, St. Joseph	
Van Buren	South Haven Township	12.037	19.372	BL I-196 – South Haven, Watervliet	
Van Buren	South Haven–South Haven Township line	12.512	20.136	M-43 – South Haven, Kalamazoo	
Van Buren	South Haven	13.669	21.998	BL I-196 – South Haven	
Allegan	Ganges Township	23.056– 23.077	37.105– 37.139	I-196 / US 31 / LMCT – Benton Harbor, Holland	Exit 30 on I-196/US 31
Allegan	Ganges–Saugatuck township line	27.595	44.410	M-89	
Allegan	Saugatuck Township	29.664– 29.689	47.740– 47.780	I-196 / US 31 / LMCT – Benton Harbor, Holland	Exit 36 on I-196/US 31
Allegan	Saugatuck Township	34.720– 34.740	55.876– 55.909	I-196 / US 31 / LMCT – Benton Harbor, Holland	Exit 41 on I-196/US 31
Allegan	Holland	41.609	66.963	BL I-196 / US 31 – Holland, Niles, Muskegon	Exit 47 on BL I-196/US 31
1.000 mi = 1.609 km; 1.000 km = 0.621 mi
