= Interstate 196 =

Interstate Highway in Michigan

Interstate 196
- I-196 highlighted in red

Route information
- Auxiliary route of I-96
- Maintained by MDOT
- Length: 80.594 mi (129.703 km)
- Existed: 1963–present
- Tourist routes: Lake Michigan Circle Tour; West Michigan Pike Pure Michigan Byway
- NHS: Entire route

Major junctions
- South end: I-94 / US 31 near Benton Harbor
- US 31 near Holland; M-6 near Hudsonville; US 131 in Grand Rapids
- East end: I-96 / M-37 near Grand Rapids

Location
- Country: United States
- State: Michigan
- Counties: Berrien, Van Buren, Allegan, Ottawa, Kent

Highway system
- Interstate Highway System; Main; Auxiliary; Suffixed; Business; Future; Michigan State Trunkline Highway System; Interstate; US; State; Byways
← M-195	→ M-196

Interstate 196 (I-196) is an auxiliary Interstate Highway that runs for 80.6 miles (129.7 km) in the US state of Michigan. It is a state trunkline highway that links Benton Harbor, South Haven, Holland, and Grand Rapids. In Kent, Ottawa, and Allegan counties, I-196 is known as the Gerald R. Ford Freeway, or simply the Ford Freeway, after President Gerald Ford, who was raised in Grand Rapids and served Michigan in the House of Representatives for 25 years. This name generally refers only to the section between Holland and Grand Rapids. I-196 changes direction; it is signed as a north–south highway from its southern terminus to the junction with US Highway 31 (US 31) just south of Holland, and as an east–west trunkline from this point to its eastern terminus at an interchange with I-96, its parent highway. There are three business routes related to the main freeway. There are two business loops (BL I-196) and one business spur (BS I-196) that serve South Haven, Holland and the Grand Rapids areas. Another business spur for Muskegon had been designated relative to the I-196 number.

The freeway numbered I-196 is the second in the state to bear the number. Originally to be numbered as part of the I-94 corridor in the state, the Benton Harbor–Grand Rapids freeway was given the I-96 number in the 1950s while another Interstate between Muskegon and Grand Rapids was numbered I-196. That I-196 was built in the late 1950s and completed in the early 1960s. The first segment of the current I-196 was opened as I-96 near Benton Harbor in 1962. Michigan officials requested a change in 1963 which reversed the two numbers, and the subsequent segments of freeway opened northward to Holland and from Grand Rapids westward under the current number. The gap between Holland and Grandville was filled in the 1970s, and a section of freeway that runs through downtown Grand Rapids was rebuilt as a wider freeway in 2010.

== Route description ==
Like other state highways in Michigan, I-196 is maintained by the Michigan Department of Transportation (MDOT). In 2011, the department's traffic surveys showed that on average, 77,500 vehicles used the highway daily between Lane Avenue and US 131 in Grand Rapids and 12,778 vehicles did so each day north of the split with US 31 near Holland. These are the highest and lowest counts along the highway, respectively. As an Interstate Highway, all of I-196 is listed on the National Highway System, a network of roads important to the country's economy, defense, and mobility. In addition, the highway has been named by the Michigan Legislature the Gerald R. Ford Freeway to honor the 38th President of the United States. The original legislation from 1974 extended that name to the full length of the freeway, but when the various memorial highway names were re-codified in 2001, the name was not applied to the Berrien County segment. From the junction with M-63 north to the split with US 31 except for the section that connects the ends of the South Haven business loop, the freeway is also a part of the Lake Michigan Circle Tour (LMCT), a tourist route that follows Lake Michigan.

=== Benton Harbor to Holland ===
The freeway starts northeast of Benton Harbor at exit 34 on I-94 in Benton Charter Township in Berrien County. At the trumpet interchange, I-196 runs north from I-94 and passes to the west of the Point O'Woods Golf & Country Club. US 31 joins I-196 from the southwest and runs concurrently with I-196 as the freeway passes through farm fields in southwestern Michigan. The trunkline turns northwesterly near the Lake Michigan Hills Golf Course and crosses the Paw Paw River. Past the river, the freeway turns northeasterly and runs roughly parallel to the Lake Michigan shoreline several miles inland. At the community of Lake Michigan Beach, I-196/US 31 meets the northern terminus of M-63 at exit 7, and the LMCT joins the freeway for the first time. North of this interchange, the freeway parallels A-2, a county road that follows the Blue Star Highway, the former route of US 31.

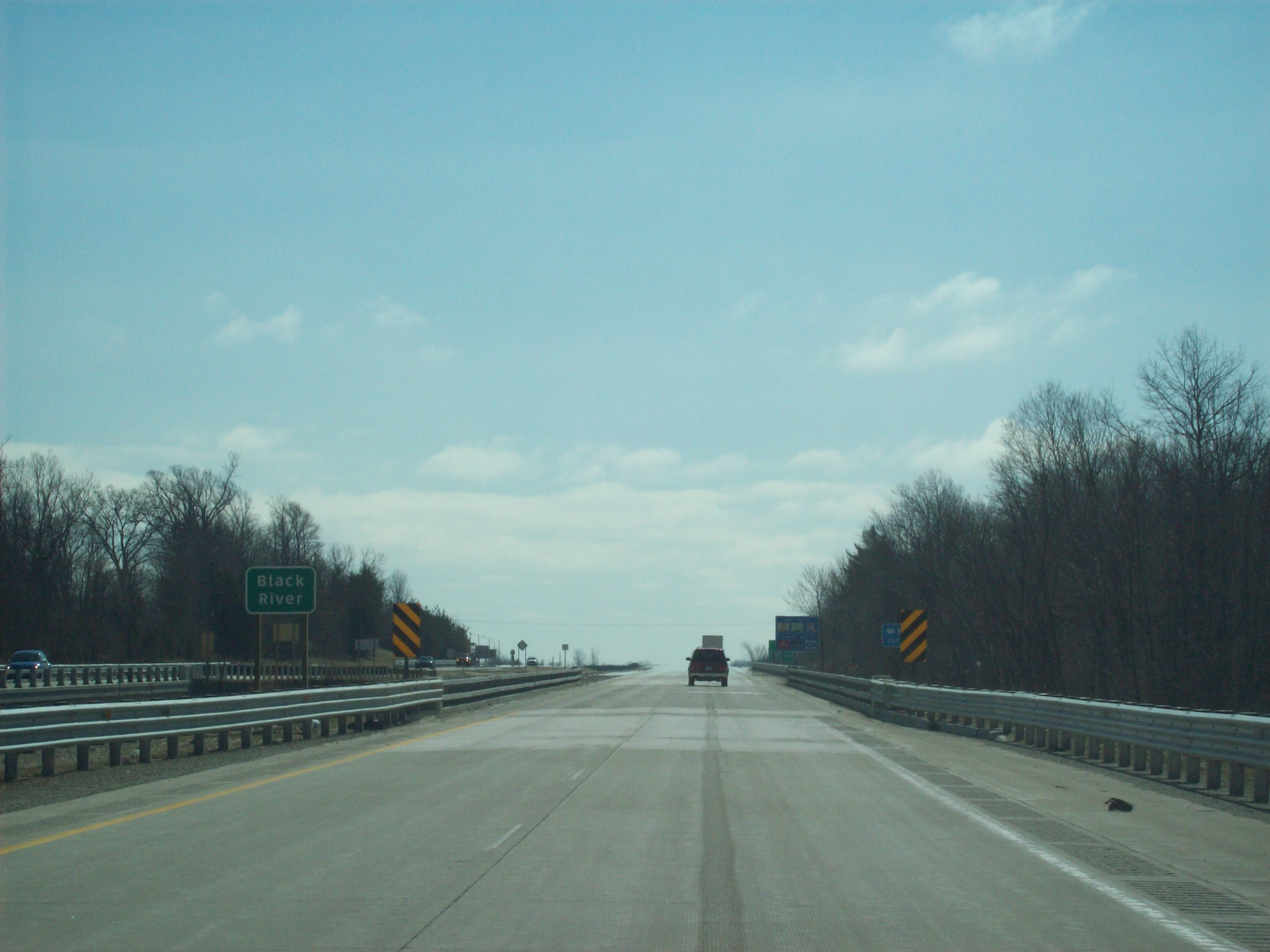
Crossing the Black River bridge near South Haven

A bit further north, I-196/US 31 crosses into Van Buren County and assumes the Gerald R. Ford Freeway name. The inland side of the freeway is forested while the lakeward side is predominantly either forest or fields. As it approaches South Haven, the freeway passes near the Palisades Nuclear Generating Station and Van Buren State Park. North of the power plant and park, the freeway turns farther inland to bypass the city of South Haven. There is an interchange on the south side of town that provides access to Business Loop I-196 (BL I-196) and M-140. The freeway crosses over M-43 without an interchange and then intersects the other end of the business loop about two miles (3.2 km) later. It crosses the Black River near the Van Buren–Allegan county line.

In Allegan County, I-196/US 31 passes a pair of golf courses and continues northward through farm fields. Near the community of Glenn, A-2 crosses over the freeway and runs parallel to it on the east. They trade places again when I-196/US 31 turns northeasterly on the south side of the twin cities of Saugatuck and Douglas. The freeway crosses over a section of Kalamazoo Lake, a wider section of the Kalamazoo River that flows between the two towns. A-2 crosses back to the eastern side of the freeway north of Saugatuck, and I-196/US 31 continues north-northeasterly toward Holland.

=== Holland to Grand Rapids ===
On the south side of Holland, the two highways split apart; US 31 separates from I-196 at a partial interchange near the West Michigan Regional Airport (formerly the Tulip City Airport). At this interchange, northbound traffic may follow a left exit to continue on the BL I-196/US 31 freeway or continue along I-196 which turns more eastward; the LMCT departs I-196 at this point as well. Signage along I-196 changes after this interchange. Up to this point, it had been signed north–south, but from the US 31 split onward, the directions are now signed east–west. The freeway passes to the south side of the airport, and it crosses a rail line owned by CSX Transportation and used by Amtrak's Pere Marquette train before curving northeasterly through the interchange with M-40. The freeway crosses into Ottawa County south of the Macatawa River before meeting the other two interchanges for Holland, the second of which is the northern end of the business loop in Zeeland.

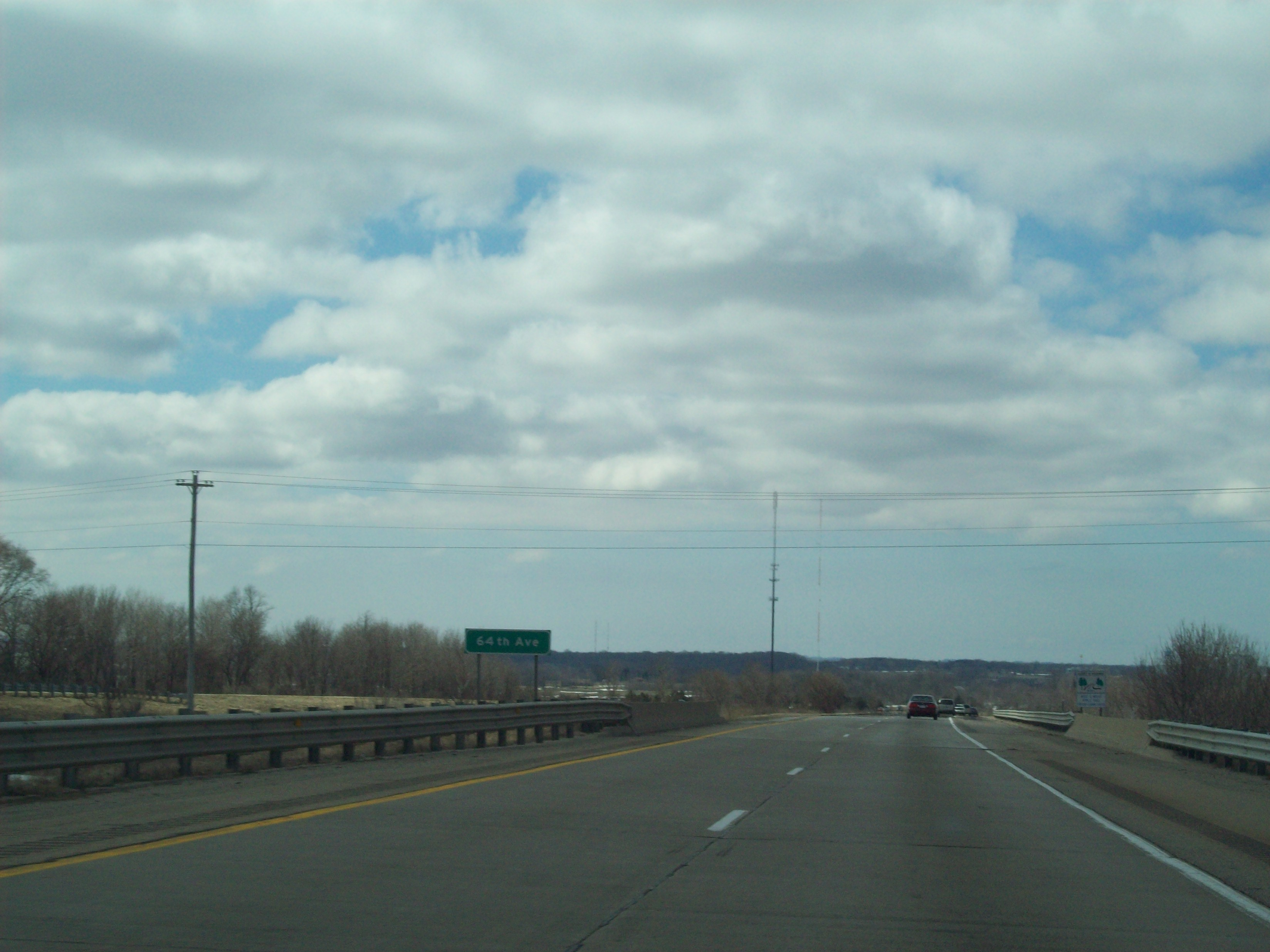
I-196 overpass at 64th Avenue in Zeeland

Continuing past Zeeland, I-196 runs more east-northeasterly as it parallels M-121 (Chicago Drive). The freeway passes to the south side of Hudsonville and intersects A-37. About two miles (3.2 km) past Hudsonville, the trunkline has an interchange with M-6, a freeway that runs along the south side of the Grand Rapids area. Just past this interchange, the freeway crosses into Kent County at the Kenowa Avenue overpass. Now in the city of Grandville, I-196 turns northward to run parallel to the county line. The freeway has an interchange for 44th Street, which provides access to the RiverTown Crossings mall and other retail and restaurant establishments in the area. At exit 69, I-196 crosses Chicago Drive and the rail line and turns northeasterly next to Jenison, an unincorporated community opposite the Kent–Ottawa county line. The Ford Freeway name is now prominently used on the freeway signage as I-196 follows a section of the Grand River. Past the interchange for M-11 (28th Street), the freeway crosses into the suburb of Wyoming.

In Wyoming, the freeway runs along the river, passing Millennium Park on the opposite banks in Walker and Hopewell Indian Mounds Park on the near banks. To the south of the freeway, the business spur for Wyoming and Grand Rapids departs to follow Chicago Drive near an industrial area. After the interchange for Market Avenue, I-196 crosses the Grand River and enters the city of Grand Rapids. The freeway meanders northward past the transmission antennas for radio stations WJRW and WYHA and around the west side of the John Ball Zoological Garden. The trunkline has an interchange with M-45 (Lake Michigan Drive) on the north side of the zoo before I-196 runs downhill turning eastward.

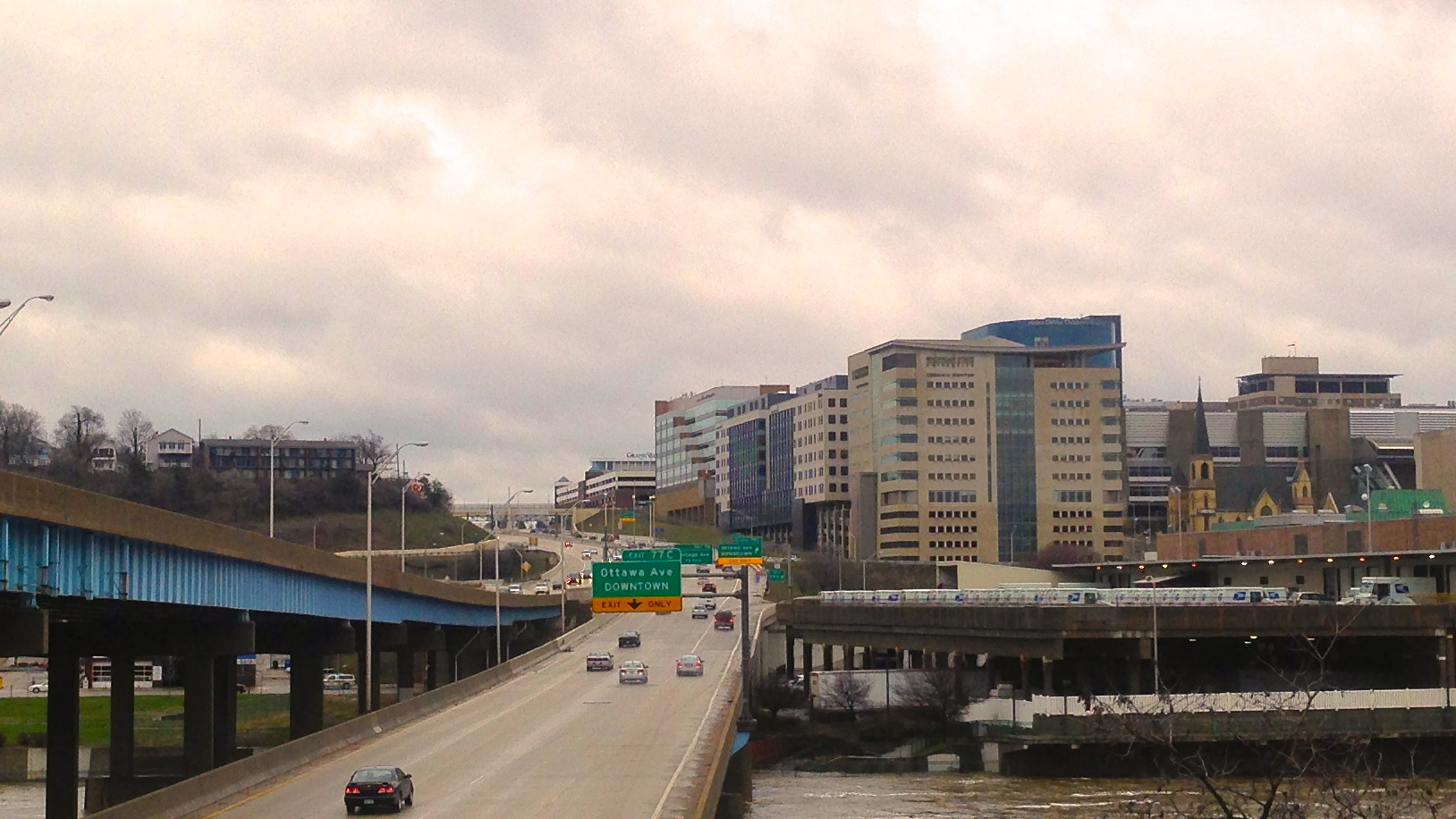
Entering downtown Grand Rapids

At the bottom of the hill, I-196 enters the urban core of Grand Rapids. The freeway runs eastward through residential neighborhoods on the city's west side as it approaches the interchange with US 131. This complex structure is adjacent to the Grand River north of the Gerald R. Ford Presidential Museum. The carriageways for I-196 run through the interchange on different levels, with the eastbound traffic carried down near river level and the westbound lanes above the crisscrossing carriageways of US 131's freeway. I-196 crosses the river on the opposite side of the interchange and both directions return to the same level. The freeway picks up an additional lane at this point as the median is replaced by a concrete barrier.

As the freeway runs eastward, it passes the area of Grand Rapids known as the "Medical Mile", a district anchored by the Van Andel Institute, Helen DeVos Children's Hospital, a campus of the Michigan State University College of Human Medicine and the Butterworth Hospital campus of Corewell Health. The Ford Freeway jogs slightly to the northeast as it crosses a line of the Grand Rapids Eastern Railroad between College and Eastern avenues. It then passes to the south of the office buildings that house the Kent County Health Department, the Sheriff's Department and the animal shelter. A little over a mile and a quarter (2.0 km) east of those offices, I-196 meets its parent highway, I-96 on the east side of the city. This interchange marks the eastern terminus of the Ford Freeway and I-196.

== History ==
=== Previous designation ===
Interstate 196
- Location: Muskegon–Grand Rapids
- Length: 37.073 mi (59.663 km)
- Existed: 1959–1963

In the first tentative Interstate numbering plans, the freeways in Michigan now numbered I-96 and I-196 were supposed to be part of the I-94 corridor, and the freeway between Muskegon and Grand Rapids was to be I-94N. Later, the initial approvals by the federal government routed I-96 from Benton Harbor north to Grand Rapids and then east to Detroit, and I-196 was the spur route from Grand Rapids to Muskegon. (Note: The MSHD was awaiting final numbering approval in 1959 before it would sign any Interstates in the state, a fact borne out by its 1958 recommendations on the numbers to be used and the 1957 general approval of the numbering scheme.) The first segment of freeway built was a relocated section of US 16 near Coopersville and Marne. The freeway opened at the end of 1957 or in early 1958, and the first markers for I-196 were erected in 1959. The full Grand Rapids–Muskegon I-196 freeway was completed and opened to traffic in December 1962, connecting to an I-96 freeway that led east toward Lansing; the US 16 corridor was a continuous freeway with two different Interstate designations. Before the Grand Rapids–Benton Harbor segment was completed, the Michigan State Highway Department (MSHD), predecessor to the modern MDOT, petitioned federal highway officials to switch the Interstate designations west of Grand Rapids. Permission for this switch was granted in 1963, and the signs were changed in January 1964. Consideration was also made to name the Grand Rapids–Benton Harbor freeway I-67. The previously completed I-196 was redesignated as an extension of I-96, and the completed freeway segments southwest of Grand Rapids were redesignated I-196; I-67 was rejected by the American Association of State Highway Officials.

=== Current designation ===
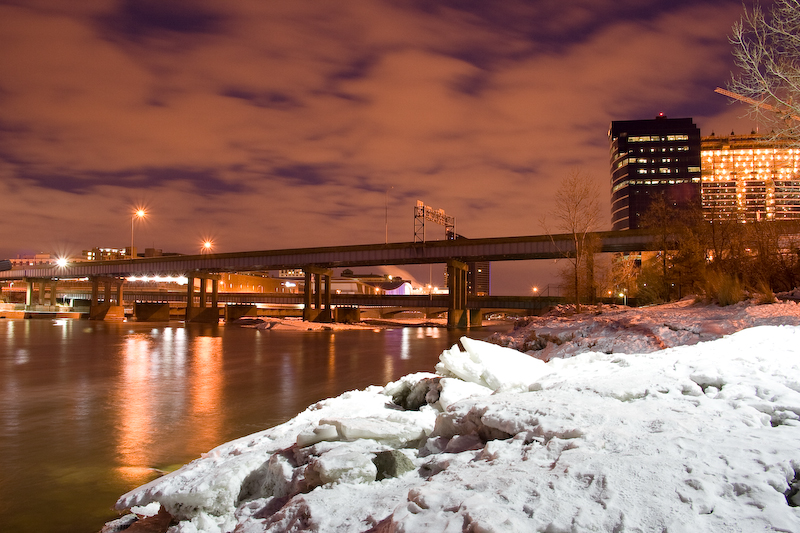
Bridges carrying I-196 over the Grand River

In August 1963, a section of freeway along US 31 was opened between I-94 and South Haven. This section was originally designated as part of I-96/US 31. After the designation switch later in 1963, an additional section was opened from South Haven to Holland as I-196. An additional section of freeway was opened between Grandville through downtown Grand Rapids to meet I-96 at the end of 1964. M-21 was moved to the freeway from its previous surface-street routing. The final link in the freeway was completed in November 1974 along the Holland–Grandville segment, completing I-196 for a second time. At the same time, M-21 was removed from the freeway, truncating that highway designation to end in Grand Rapids.

In 2009, access to Jenison was improved by the addition of a partial interchange with Baldwin Street. The section through downtown Grand Rapids east of the Grand River was rebuilt during 2010 in a project MDOT dubbed the "Fix on I-196". The project added a third travel lane in each direction with weave-merge lanes between interchanges and rebuilt several of the overpasses in the area. In 2016, the sections of I-196 that run concurrently with US 31 north of the M-63 interchange, except between the ends of the business loop at South Haven were designated as part of the West Michigan Pike Pure Michigan Byway.

== Exit list ==
County	Location	mi	km	Exit	Destinations	Notes
Berrien	Benton Township	0.000	0.000	—	I-94 / US 31 south – Detroit, Chicago, South Bend	Southern end of US 31 concurrency; southbound exit and northbound entrance; exit 34 on I-94
Berrien	Benton Township	1.051	1.691	1	Red Arrow Highway	
Berrien	Hagar Township	3.677	5.918	4	Coloma, Riverside	Connects to Coloma Road
Berrien	Hagar Township	6.751	10.865	7	M-63 south / LMCT south (Hagar Shore Road) – Benton Harbor, St. Joseph	Southern end of LMCT concurrency; Hagar Shore Road signed northbound only; Benton Harbor and St. Joseph signed southbound only
Van Buren	Covert Township	12.624	20.316	13	Covert	Connects to 32nd Avenue
Van Buren	South Haven Township	17.572	28.279	18	BL I-196 north / LMCT north to M-43 – South Haven, Bangor M-140 south – Watervliet	Northern end of LMCT concurrency; northern terminus of M-140, southern terminus of BL I-196; northbound signage omits Watervliet; signed only as M-140 – Watervliet southbound
Van Buren	South Haven	20.383	32.803	20	BL I-196 south / LMCT south to M-43 (Phoenix Street) – South Haven, Bangor	Southern end of LMCT concurrency; signed only as Phoenix Street northbound; northern terminus of BL I-196; signed as exits 20A (east) and 20B (west) northbound
Allegan	Casco Township	21.966	35.351	22	North Shore Drive	
Allegan	Casco Township	26.309	42.340	26	109th Avenue – Pullman	
Allegan	Ganges Township	29.570	47.588	30	A-2 – Ganges, Glenn	Ganges signed northbound only
Allegan	Ganges–Saugatuck township line	33.922	54.592	34	M-89 – Fennville	Western terminus of M-89
Allegan	Saugatuck Township	36.111	58.115	36	A-2 – Douglas, Saugatuck, Ganges	Saugatuck and Douglas signed northbound only; Ganges signed southbound only; southern terminus of locally designated LMCT Harbor Tour
Allegan	Laketown Township	40.925	65.862	41	A-2 (Blue Star Highway) – Douglas, Saugatuck	Blue Star Highway signed northbound only; LMCT Harbor Tour, Saugatuck, and Douglas signed southbound only; northern terminus of locally designated LMCT Harbor Tour
Allegan	Laketown Township	44.495	71.608	44	US 31 north / BL I-196 east (LMCT north) – Holland, Muskegon	Northern end of US 31 and LMCT concurrencies; northbound left exit and southbound entrance; I-196 cardinal direction changes between north–south and east–west
Allegan	Holland	48.600	78.214	49	M-40 – Allegan	
Ottawa	Holland Township	52.230	84.056	52	Adams Street, 16th Street	
Ottawa	Zeeland Township	55.485	89.294	55	BL I-196 west (Byron Road) – Holland, Zeeland	Eastern terminus of BL I-196; eastbound signage omits BL I-196 and Holland; westbound signage omits Byron Road
Ottawa	Hudsonville	62.217	100.129	62	A-37 (32nd Avenue) – Hudsonville	
Ottawa	Georgetown Township	64.174– 64.886	103.278– 104.424	64	M-6 east (Paul B. Henry Freeway) – Lansing	Western terminus of M-6
Kent	Grandville	67.346	108.383	67	44th Street, Rivertown Parkway	
Kent	Grandville	68.748	110.639	69	M-121 west / Chicago Drive – Jenison	Signed as exits 69A (east) and 69B (west) westbound; eastern terminus of M-121
Kent	Grandville	68.940	110.948	69C	Baldwin Street	Westbound exit and eastbound entrance; exit opened November 2009
Kent	Grandville	69.747	112.247	70	M-11 (28th Street, Wilson Avenue)	Signed as exits 70A (M-11 east, 28th Street) and 70B (M-11 west, Wilson Avenue) eastbound
Kent	Wyoming	71.716	115.416	72	BS I-196 east (Chicago Drive)	Eastbound exit and westbound entrance from westbound Chicago Drive only
Kent	Grand Rapids	73.406	118.136	73	Market Avenue	
Kent	Grand Rapids	74.898	120.537	75	M-45 west (Lake Michigan Drive)	No access from westbound Lake Michigan Drive to eastbound I-196 or westbound I-196 to eastbound Lake Michigan Drive; eastern terminus of M-45
Kent	Grand Rapids	75.774	121.946	76	Lane Avenue	
Kent	Grand Rapids	76.515– 76.567	123.139– 123.223	77	US 131 (I-296 north) – Kalamazoo, Cadillac	Signed as exits 77A (US 131 north, Cadillac) and 77B (US 131 south, Kalamazoo); southern terminus of unsigned I-296
Kent	Grand Rapids	76.932	123.810	77C	Ottawa Avenue – Downtown Grand Rapids	No access to northbound Ottawa Avenue from westbound I-196; entrances from Ionia Avenue and Division Street
Kent	Grand Rapids	77.601	124.887	78	College Avenue	
Kent	Grand Rapids	78.491	126.319	79	Fuller Avenue	
Kent	Grand Rapids	80.594	129.703	38	M-44 / M-37 south (East Beltline Avenue)	Eastbound exit only; exit number follows I-96
Kent	Grand Rapids	80.594	129.703		I-96 east – Lansing	Eastern terminus; exit 37 on I-96
1.000 mi = 1.609 km; 1.000 km = 0.621 mi: Concurrency terminus; Incomplete access

== Business routes ==
There are currently three business loops (BL I-196) and one business spur (BS I-196) along I-196. A BS I-196 in Muskegon was designated along what is now Bus. US 31 before the Muskegon–Grand Rapids freeway was redesignated I-96.

=== South Haven ===
Business Loop Interstate 196
- Location: South Haven
- Length: 3.572 mi (5.749 km)
- Existed: 1963–present
- Tourist routes: Lake Michigan Circle Tour; West Michigan Pike Pure Michigan Byway

Business Loop I-196 (BL I-196) is a loop that runs in South Haven for 3.572 miles (5.749 km). The loop begins at exit 18 on I-196/US 31 and runs due north along La Grange Street. It then turns onto Phillips Street and merges into Broadway Street. BL I-196 follows Phoenix Street eastward where the trunkline ends at exit 20 on I-196. The entire length is a part of the LMCT. A bypass of downtown was built during World War II; the former route of US 31 through downtown was designated Bus. US 31 at that time. When I-196 was built outside of South Haven in 1963, the former US 31 bypass was redesignated BL I-196. In 1972, the loop was shifted to follow the pre-war routing through downtown. In 2016, all of the business loop was designated as part of the West Michigan Pike Pure Michigan Byway.

Major intersections
The entire highway is in Van Buren County.

Location	mi	km	Destinations	Notes
South Haven Township	0.000	0.000	I-196 / US 31 / LMCT – Benton Harbor, Holland M-140 south – Watervliet	Exit 18 on I-196; northern terminus of M-140; southern end of LMCT concurrency
South Haven Township	1.189	1.914	A-2 (Blue Star Highway)	
South Haven	2.125	3.420	M-43 east – Kalamazoo	Western terminus of M-43
South Haven	3.273	5.267	A-2 (Blue Star Highway)	
South Haven	3.572	5.749	I-196 / US 31 / LMCT – Benton Harbor, Holland; Phoenix Road	Exit 20 on I-196; northern end of LMCT concurrency; roadway continues eastward as Phoenix Road
1.000 mi = 1.609 km; 1.000 km = 0.621 mi

=== Holland ===
Business Loop Interstate 196
- Location: Holland–Zeeland
- Length: 11.649 mi (18.747 km)
- Existed: 1974–present
- Tourist routes: Lake Michigan Circle Tour; West Michigan Pike Pure Michigan Byway

Business Loop I-196 (BL I-196) is a loop that runs for 11.649 miles (18.747 km) in Holland and Zeeland. The loop starts at a connection with I-196/US 31 at exit 44 and continues concurrently along the freeway into Holland. BL I-196/US 31 has an interchange for A-2 (Blue Star Highway) and Washington Avenue before the freeway ends in the southern reaches of Holland. The trunkline then runs as a divided highway northward, bypassing downtown Holland to the east and intersecting M-40. Northeast of downtown, BL I-196 leaves US 31 and the LMCT at an interchange to follow an expressway along the route of Chicago Drive. The loop follows this expressway through Zeeland and back out to I-196 at exit 55.

The loop was created in 1974 when I-196 was completed south of the city of Holland. From that point, the old route of M-21 inside the cities to US 31 was redesignated as a business loop of I-196 with the state taking control of Washington Avenue to the downtown area. Then from downtown looping back up to Chicago Drive, the business loop used the old M-21. Along Washington Avenue and Chicago Drive between junctions with US 31, the highway bore a concurrent Bus. US 31 designation. The concurrent trunkline inside the downtown area of Holland was transferred to the City of Holland in 2005, and BL I-196 was rerouted to follow US 31. In 2016, the section of the business loop that runs concurrently with US 31 was designated as part of the West Michigan Pike Pure Michigan Byway.

Major intersections
All exits are unnumbered.

County	Location	mi	km	Destinations	Notes
Allegan	Laketown Township	0.000	0.000	I-196 south (Gerald R. Ford Freeway) / US 31 south / LMCT south – South Haven	Southern end of US 31/LMCT concurrency; southbound exit and northbound entrance only; exit 44 on I-196/US 31
Allegan	Holland	2.013	3.240	A-2 (Blue Star Highway) / Washington Avenue	Northern terminus of A-2; former southern terminus of Bus. US 31; signed as Exit 47A-B
Allegan	Holland	2.882	4.638	Northern end of freeway	
Allegan	Holland	3.413	5.493	M-40 south – Allegan	Northern terminus of M-40
Ottawa	Holland	6.192	9.965	US 31 north / LMCT north – Grand Haven	Northern end of US 31/LMCT concurrency; partial cloverleaf interchange
Ottawa	Zeeland	10.952	17.626	M-121 east – Hudsonville	Western terminus of M-121
Ottawa	Zeeland	11.649	18.747	I-196 – Grand Rapids, South Haven	Exit 55 on I-196
1.000 mi = 1.609 km; 1.000 km = 0.621 mi: Concurrency terminus

=== Wyoming ===
Business Spur Interstate 196
- Location: Wyoming–Grand Rapids
- Length: 2.433 mi (3.916 km)
- Existed: 1974–present

Business Spur I-196 (BS I-196) is a spur that serves the Godfrey–Lee area of Wyoming, Michigan. It starts at the partial interchange for exit 72 on I-196 and then moves onto the surface street Chicago Drive for the majority of the distance in Wyoming, running through an industrial area. After about a mile (1.6 km), the highway runs through residential areas. Upon reaching the Grand Rapids city limits, it ends at Cesar E Chavez Avenue. Its total length is 2.4 miles (3.9 km). It can be accessed only from eastbound I-196 on the western end.

In 1953, the state highway department completed enough of the Grand Rapids beltline to reroute M-21 to it. The former routing of M-21 was then redesignated Bus. M-21. With the completion of I-196 from Holland to Grand Rapids in 1974, the highway was truncated to run between I-196 and US 131 and renamed BS I-196. In December 2017, it was shortened further to end at the Grand Rapids city limits at the intersection between Chicago Drive and Clyde Park Avenue when the remainder of the trunkline along Grandville Avenue and Franklin Street (Note: Grandville Avenue and Franklin Street were renamed to Cesar E Chavez Avenue and Martin Luther King Jr. Street, respectively, in February 2022.) was turned over to local control.

Major intersections
The entire highway is in Kent County.

Location	mi	km	Destinations	Notes
Wyoming	0.000– 0.231	0.000– 0.372	I-196 west – Holland; Chicago Drive	Westbound exit to, and eastbound entrance from, exit 72 on I-196; roadway continues westerly as Chicago Drive
Wyoming–Grand Rapids city line	2.433	3.916	Clyde Park Avenue; Cesar E Chavez Avenue	Roadway continues as Cesar E Chavez Avenue
1.000 mi = 1.609 km; 1.000 km = 0.621 mi: Incomplete access
