= Interstate 67 =

Interstate 67 was a proposed designation for several Interstate Highways:

- A former proposed highway connecting South Bend, Indiana, with Kalamazoo, Michigan, which would eventually be shifted further east and designated Interstate 69
- A former proposed designation for what would become Interstate 196
- A former proposal from the state of Indiana to upgrade U.S. Route 31 between Indianapolis, Indiana, and South Bend, Indiana, to Interstate Highway standards
- A former proposed highway connecting Owensboro, Kentucky, to Interstate 69 near Washington, Indiana
