= M-137 (Michigan highway) =

Former state highway in Grand Traverse County, Michigan, United States

M-137
- M-137 highlighted in red

Route information
- Maintained by MDOT
- Length: 2.884 mi (4.641 km)
- Existed: 1930–2020

Major junctions
- South end: Vagabond Lane at Interlochen State Park
- North end: US 31 in Interlochen

Location
- Country: United States
- State: Michigan
- Counties: Grand Traverse

Highway system
- Michigan State Trunkline Highway System; Interstate; US; State; Byways
← M-136	→ M-138

M-137 was a state trunkline highway in the US state of Michigan that served as a spur route to the Interlochen Center for the Arts and Interlochen State Park. It started south of the park and ran north between two lakes in the area and through the community of Interlochen to US Highway 31 (US 31) in Grand Traverse County. The highway was first shown without a number label on maps in 1930 and labeled after an extension the next year. The highway's current routing was established in the 1950s. Jurisdiction of the roadway was transferred from the Michigan Department of Transportation (MDOT) to the Grand Traverse County Road Commission in June 2020, and the highway designation was decommissioned in the process; signage was removed by August 2020 to reflect the changeover.

== Route description ==
M-137 began at the southern end of Interlochen State Park at an intersection with Vagabond Lane. Farther south, the roadway continues toward Green Lake Airport as County Road 137 (CR 137), also known as Karlin Road. The state highway was a two-lane road that meandered north, passing the entrance to the state park and near the Interlochen Center for the Arts. The road continued along the isthmus between Green and Duck lakes. North of the school, the highway passed through a wooded section before entering the community of Interlochen itself near the Green Lake Township Hall. There M-137 ran almost due north before terminating at its connection with the rest of the state trunkline system at US 31 at Interlochen Corners. The roadway continues north of US 31 as South Long Lake Road after the M-137 designation ended.

M-137 was maintained by MDOT like other state highways in Michigan. According to the department in 2010, 4,868 vehicles used the highway daily on average. No section of M-137 had been listed on the National Highway System, a network of roads important to the country's economy, defense, and mobility.

== History ==
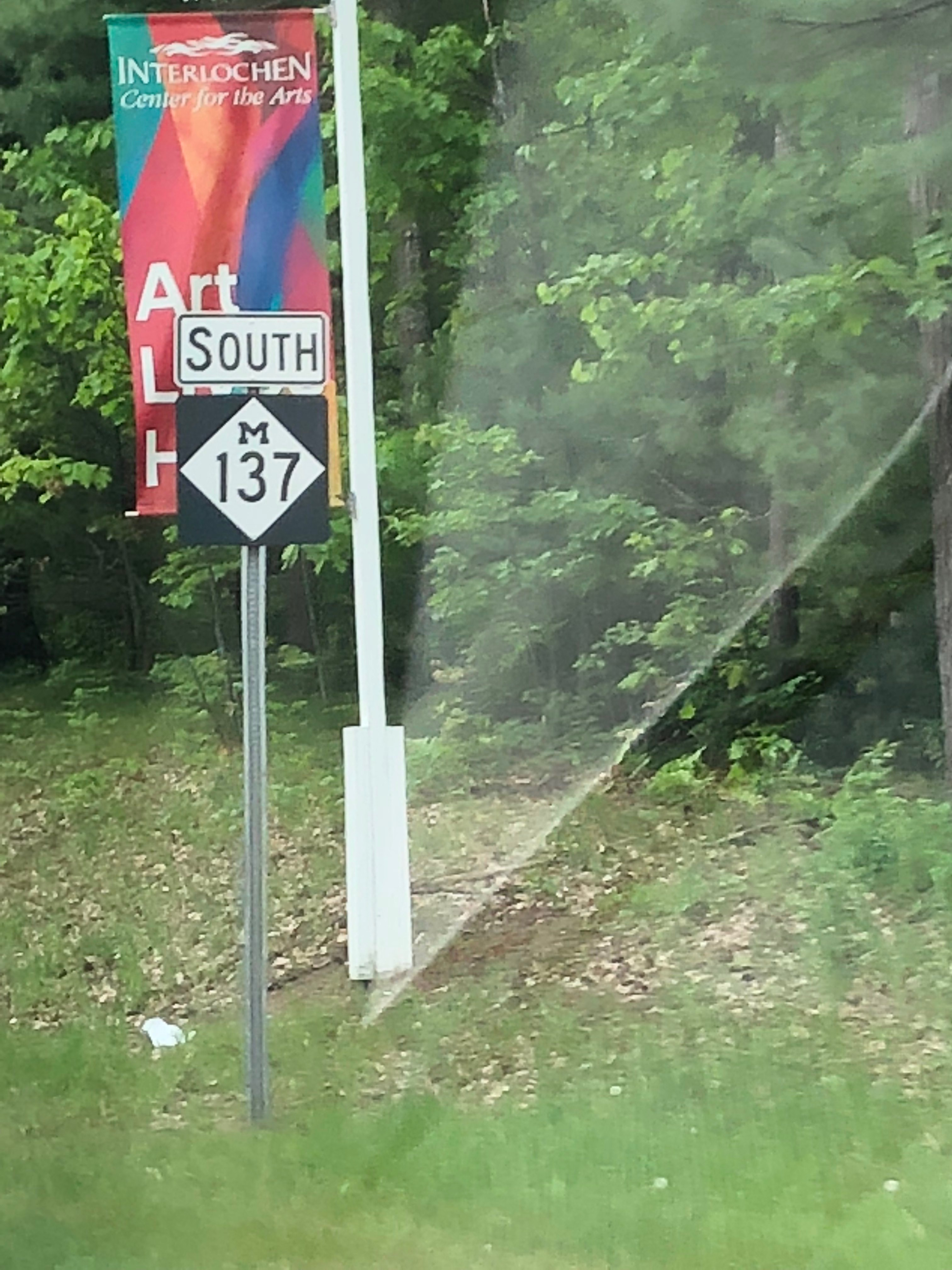
M-137 reassurance marker near Diamond Park Road and the entrance to Interlochen Center for the Arts, May 2018

A highway along the route of M-137 connecting US 31 south to the state park was added to the state highway system during the first half of 1930, initially lacking a designation label on the state maps of the time. This routing was extended by 0.9 miles (1.4 km) and labelled as M-137 on maps in 1931. The former route through the campus of the Interlochen Center for the Arts was abandoned as a roadway on March 26, 1956, after M-137 was realigned to pass to the east of the school and extended further south through the state park area.

On April 30, 2020, the GTCRC was to vote on a resolution to accept jurisdiction over M-137 from MDOT, effective June 1, 2020; the board approved the resolution. MDOT announced on August 6, 2020, that jurisdiction had been transferred at the beginning of June and that all M-137 signage had since been removed.

== Major intersections ==
The entire highway was in Grand Traverse County.

Location	mi	km	Destinations	Notes
Interlochen State Park	0.000	0.000	Vagabond Lane; CR 137	Roadway continues south as CR 137
Green Lake Township	2.884	4.641	US 31 – Manistee, Traverse City	Roadway continues north as South Long Lake Road
1.000 mi = 1.609 km; 1.000 km = 0.621 mi
