= Ganges Township, Michigan =

- Township
- Location within the state of Michigan
- Coordinates: 42°32′32″N 86°11′56″W
- Country: United States
- State: Michigan
- County: Allegan

Area
  - Total: 32.7 sq mi (84.7 km^{2})
  - Land: 32.0 sq mi (83.0 km^{2})
  - Water: 0.66 sq mi (1.7 km^{2})
- Elevation: 699 ft (213 m)

Population (2020)
  - Total: 2,574
  - Density: 79/sq mi (30.5/km^{2})
- Time zone: UTC-5 (Eastern (EST))
  - Summer (DST): UTC-4 (EDT)
- FIPS code: 26-31360
- GNIS feature ID: 1626332
- Website: www.gangestownship.org

Ganges Township is a civil township of Allegan County in the U.S. state of Michigan. The population was 2,574 at the 2020 census.

== Communities ==
There are no incorporated villages within the township, but several unincorporated communities:

- Belknap is located at 66th Street and 116th Avenue in the southern part of the township.
- Ganges is located in the northwest part of the township at the junction of 122nd Ave and Blue Star Highway at 42°34′37″N 86°12′37″W. Interstate 196 / US 31 is less than a quarter mile to the west, but the nearest access is from M-89 about a mile to the north.
- Glenn is located within the southwest part of the township at the junction of 114th Ave and A-2 (Blue Star Highway/Adams Rd) at 42°31′13″N 86°13′39″W. A post office (ZIP Code 49416) was established here in 1876. Glenn is known as "Pancake Town", stemming from an incident during a 1937 snowstorm in which travelers stranded at a restaurant had nothing to eat except for pancakes.
- Grange Corners is located in the northern part of the township at 66th Street and 122nd Avenue (42°34′39″N 86°11′26″W; Elevation: 682 feet/208 meters).
- Pier Cove is located in the northwestern corner of the township at Lake Shore Drive and 123rd Avenue (42°35′09″N 86°13′34″W; Elevation: 584 feet/178 meters).
- Plummerville is located in the northwestern part of the township at Lake Shore Drive and 121st Avenue.
- Shorecrest is located in the southwestern corner of the township off Adams Road/Blue Star Highway (42°30′23″N 86°14′40″W; Elevation: 656 feet/200 meters).

== History ==
Ganges Township was established in 1847. Esther was the name of a post office here from 1894 until 1901.

== Geography ==
According to the United States Census Bureau, the township has a total area of 32.7 square miles (84.7 km^{2}), of which 32.0 square miles (83.0 km^{2}) is land and 0.66 square miles (1.7 km^{2}), or 1.95%, is water.

== Demographics ==
Historical population
Census	Pop.	Note	%±
1960	1,672		—
1970	2,061		23.3%
1980	2,009		−2.5%
1990	2,124		5.7%
2000	2,524		18.8%
2010	2,530		0.2%
2020	2,574		1.7%
Source: Census Bureau. Census 1960- 2000, 2010.

At the 2000 census, there were 2,524 people, 982 households and 676 families residing in the township. The population density was 77.8 inhabitants per square mile (30.0/km^{2}). There were 1,384 housing units at an average density of 42.6 per square mile (16.4/km^{2}). The racial makeup of the township was 93.38% White, 0.48% African American, 0.75% Native American, 0.20% Asian, 4.12% from other races, and 1.07% from two or more races. Hispanic or Latino of any race were 11.93% of the population.

There were 982 households, of which 28.1% had children under the age of 18 living with them, 57.7% were married couples living together, 7.9% had a female householder with no husband present, and 31.1% were non-families. 23.0% of all households were made up of individuals, and 8.2% had someone living alone who was 65 years of age or older. The average household size was 2.51 and the average family size was 2.99.

24.9% of the population were under the age of 18, 6.8% from 18 to 24, 27.2% from 25 to 44, 26.5% from 45 to 64, and 14.7% who were 65 years of age or older. The median age was 40 years. For every 100 females, there were 104.4 males. For every 100 females aged 18 and over, there were 102.6 males.

The median household income was $47,143 and the median family income was $52,333. Males had a median income of $38,235 and females $24,917. The per capita income was $22,753. About 4.7% of families and 5.9% of the population were below the poverty line, including 9.0% of those under age 18 and 3.4% of those age 65 or over.
