= Lake Michigan Beach, Michigan =

- Census-designated place (CDP) & unincorporated community
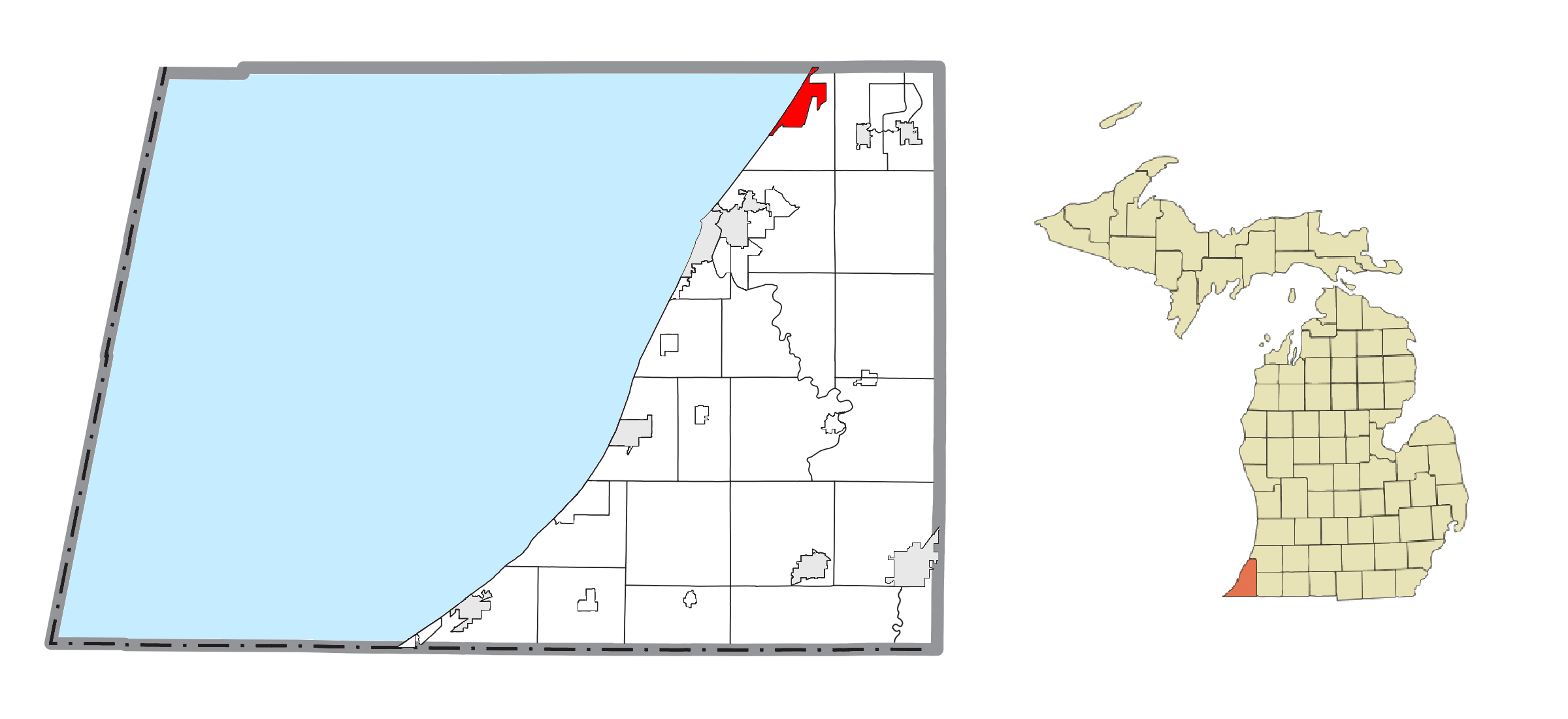
- Location within Berrien County

- Location within the state of Michigan Lake Michigan Beach (the United States)
- Coordinates: 42°13′15″N 86°22′10″W
- Country: United States
- State: Michigan
- County: Berrien
- Township: Hagar

Area
  - Total: 3.93 sq mi (10.18 km^{2})
  - Land: 3.83 sq mi (9.93 km^{2})
  - Water: 0.097 sq mi (0.25 km^{2})
- Elevation: 663 ft (202 m)

Population (2020)
  - Total: 1,101
  - Density: 287.1/sq mi (110.85/km^{2})
- Time zone: UTC-5 (Eastern (EST))
  - Summer (DST): UTC-4 (EDT)
- ZIP code(s): 49038
- Area code: 269
- FIPS code: 26-44820
- GNIS feature ID: 0629980

Lake Michigan Beach is an unincorporated community in Berrien County in the U.S. state of Michigan. It is a census-designated place (CDP) for statistical purposes, without any legal status as a municipality. The population was 1,101 at the 2020 census.

The community is in Hagar Township on the shore of Lake Michigan. The area is also known as Hagar Shores.

== History ==
Lake Michigan Beach was established in 1922. It was originally primarily a summer resort but later became a village with 1,200 permanent residents. The Hagar Shores name came about in 1958 when the post office rejected the name Lake Michigan Beach.

== Geography ==
According to the United States Census Bureau, the CDP has a total area of 3.9 square miles (10.2 km^{2}), of which 3.8 square miles (9.9 km^{2}) is land and 0.077 square miles (0.2 km^{2}), or 2.44%, is water.

== Demographics ==
Historical population
Census	Pop.	Note	%±
2000	1,509		—
2010	1,216		−19.4%
2020	1,101		−9.5%
U.S. Decennial Census

As of the census of 2000, there were 1,509 people, 635 households, and 405 families residing in the CDP. The population density was 393.2 inhabitants per square mile (151.8/km^{2}). There were 1,012 housing units at an average density of 263.7 per square mile (101.8/km^{2}). The racial makeup of the CDP was 96.16% White, 0.73% Black or African American, 1.33% Native American, 0.20% Asian, 0.93% from other races, and 0.66% from two or more races. Hispanic or Latino of any race were 2.12% of the population.

There were 635 households, out of which 30.1% had children under the age of 18 living with them, 48.0% were married couples living together, 10.9% had a female householder with no husband present, and 36.1% were non-families. 29.1% of all households were made up of individuals, and 8.3% had someone living alone who was 65 years of age or older. The average household size was 2.38 and the average family size was 2.93.

In the CDP, the population was spread out, with 24.8% under the age of 18, 8.3% from 18 to 24, 30.2% from 25 to 44, 24.3% from 45 to 64, and 12.4% who were 65 years of age or older. The median age was 37 years. For every 100 females, there were 97.3 males. For every 100 females age 18 and over, there were 95.0 males.

The median income for a household in the CDP was $33,150, and the median income for a family was $39,196. Males had a median income of $34,271 versus $25,054 for females. The per capita income for the CDP was $20,253. About 6.5% of families and 7.7% of the population were below the poverty line, including 1.7% of those under age 18 and 3.4% of those age 65 or over.
