= Saugatuck Township, Michigan =

Township in the United States

- Township
- Location within the state of Michigan
- Coordinates: 42°38′36″N 86°11′25″W
- Country: United States
- State: Michigan
- County: Allegan

Area
  - Total: 24.2 sq mi (62.7 km^{2})
  - Land: 23.4 sq mi (60.5 km^{2})
  - Water: 0.85 sq mi (2.2 km^{2})
- Elevation: 627 ft (191 m)

Population (2020)
  - Total: 3,443
  - Density: 148.9/sq mi (57.48/km^{2})
- Time zone: UTC-5 (Eastern (EST))
  - Summer (DST): UTC-4 (EDT)
- ZIP code: 49453
- Area code: 269
- FIPS code: 26-71720
- GNIS feature ID: 1627046
- Website: saugatucktownshipmi.gov

Saugatuck Township is a civil township of Allegan County in the U.S. state of Michigan. The population was 3,443 at the 2020 census, up from 2944 at the 2010 census. The city of Saugatuck is in the northwestern corner of the township, but is administratively autonomous; the two share a ZIP code.

== Communities ==
There are no villages within the township, but there are two unincorporated communities:

- Macks Landing is located at Riverside Drive and 62nd Street, near the Kalamazoo River (423753N 0860916W; elevation: 614 ft (187 m).).
- Oxbow is located on Rupprecht Way, just north of Saugatuck (elevation: 594 feet/181 meters).

== History ==
In 1837, Oshea Wilder and his sons founded the community named for the southeastern Asia city of Singapore at the mouth of the Kalamazoo River. In 1875, Singapore was abandoned.

The township name was Newark until 1861.

On December 13, 2004, Douglas residents voted to adopt a charter changing the status of the village into a city form of government removing Douglas from the Township.

From 2004 to 2006, Oklahoma billionaire Aubrey McClendon bought 400 acres (160 ha) of undeveloped duneland in Saugatuck Township for $39.5 million with plans to build luxury homes, 28 condos, a hotel, a marina, and a golf course. In 2006, the Saugatuck Township Board re-zoned the land, making McClendon unable to build his planned project. The Saugatuck Dunes Coastal Alliance opposes McClendon's plans, citing environmental concerns. In 2009, McClendon sold 171 acres (69 ha) of the land in order to alleviate the group's concerns. In March 2010, McClendon sued the township in federal court to overturn the zoning. The township has spent more than $250,000 fighting the lawsuit, and has raised taxes in the township in order to raise revenue.

== Geography ==
According to the United States Census Bureau, the township has a total area of 24.2 square miles (62.7 km^{2}), of which 23.4 square miles (60.5 km^{2}) is land and 0.85 square miles (2.2 km^{2}), or 3.50%, is water.

== Demographics ==
Historical population
Census	Pop.	Note	%±
1990	2,896		—
2000	3,590		24.0%
2010	2,944		−18.0%
2020	3,443		16.9%
Source: Census Bureau. Census 1960- 2000, 2010.

As of the census of 2000, there were 3,590 people, 1,581 households, and 937 families residing in the township. The population density was 142.2 inhabitants per square mile (54.9/km^{2}). There were 2,089 housing units at an average density of 82.7 per square mile (31.9/km^{2}). The racial makeup of the township was 96.43% White, 0.42% African American, 0.31% Native American, 0.22% Asian, 0.03% Pacific Islander, 1.25% from other races, and 1.34% from two or more races. Hispanic or Latino of any race were 4.12% of the population.

There were 1,581 households, out of which 24.7% had children under the age of 18 living with them, 48.1% were married couples living together, 8.2% had a female householder with no husband present, and 40.7% were non-families. 33.3% of all households were made up of individuals, and 13.6% had someone living alone who was 65 years of age or older. The average household size was 2.20 and the average family size was 2.82.

In the township the population was spread out, with 20.8% under the age of 18, 4.6% from 18 to 24, 26.3% from 25 to 44, 30.6% from 45 to 64, and 17.8% who were 65 years of age or older. The median age was 44 years. For every 100 females, there were 97.5 males. For every 100 females age 18 and over, there were 97.0 males.

The median income for a household in the township was $43,771, and the median income for a family was $49,600. Males had a median income of $37,845 versus $30,543 for females. The per capita income for the township was $30,056. About 5.4% of families and 7.9% of the population were below the poverty line, including 10.4% of those under age 18 and 4.6% of those age 65 or over.
