= West Michigan Regional Airport =

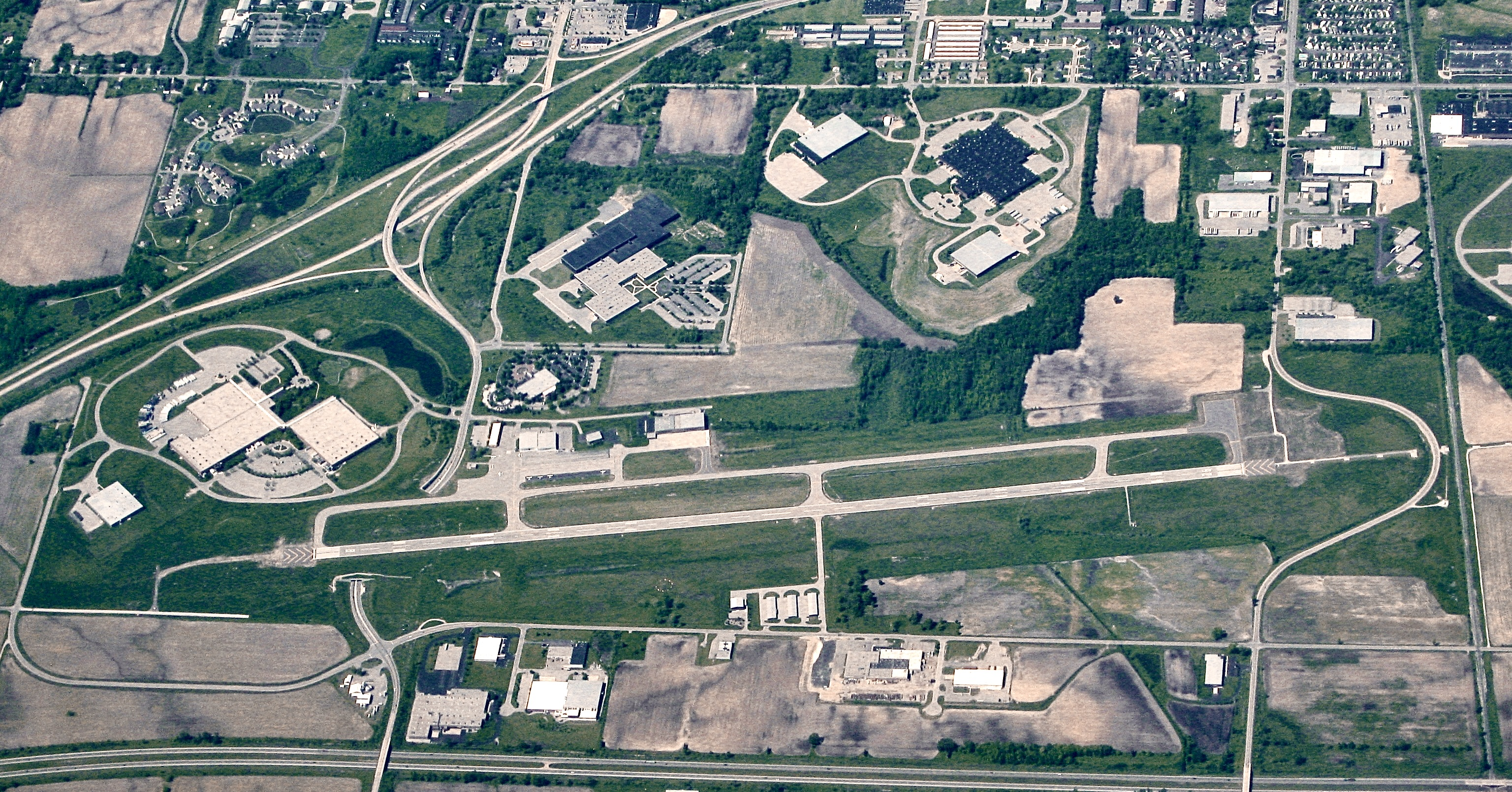
- IATA: none; ICAO: KBIV; FAA LID: BIV

Summary
- Airport type: Public
- Owner: Holland, Zeeland, Park Township
- Operator: West Michigan Airport Authority
- Serves: Holland, Michigan
- Elevation AMSL: 698 ft (213 m)
- Coordinates: 42°44′34″N 086°06′28″W
- Website: westmichiganregionalairport.com

Map
- Location of airport in Michigan BIV (the United States)

Runways
Direction	Length		Surface
Direction	ft	m	Surface
8/26	6,002	1,829	Asphalt

Statistics (2021)
- Aircraft operations: 35,000
- Based aircraft: 49
- Source: Federal Aviation Administration

West Michigan Regional Airport (ICAO: KBIV, FAA LID: BIV), formerly Tulip City Airport, is a public-use airport located in Holland, Michigan, 2 nautical miles (3.7 km) south of Holland's central business district. It is included in the Federal Aviation Administration (FAA) National Plan of Integrated Airport Systems for 2017–2021, in which it is categorized as a national general aviation facility.

The airport is owned by Holland, Zeeland, and Park Township, and operated by the West Michigan Airport Authority. The airport relies on user fees, federal and state grants, and donations to operate. A provision in the city charter prohibits tax dollars from being used for airport operations.

Although many U.S. airports use the same three-letter location identifier for the FAA and IATA, this airport is assigned BIV by the FAA but has no designation from the IATA (which assigned BIV to Bria Airport in Bria, Central African Republic).

== History ==
The airport first opened in the 1940s as a private grass strip. It was originally known as the Tulip City Airport.

The airport was originally owned by a private individual and then a corporation. In 1982, it was sold to the city of Holland so it could support public corporate traffic coming into the area. Residents initially opposed the sale because they didn't want tax dollars going towards the airport. However, since federal funds cannot be relegated to private airports, the airport was bought by the city using private funds.

A regional airport authority was authorized by area voters in November 2008. The West Michigan Airport Authority consists of representatives from Holland, Zeeland, and Park Township. In October 2011, the airport authority formally voted to change the airport's name from Tulip City Airport to West Michigan Regional Airport.

In 2014, a new business center opened on airport property to support the local fixed-base operator and airport authority.

The airport's terminal received an upgrade in 2016, with donations provided by local businesses and residents. Upgrades include an expanded aircraft ramp and a new parking lot for cars. A new terminal was also built, replacing a building that was first constructed in the 1950s. As part of the upgrade, the airport purchased adjacent farmland and relocated a ditch near the airport.

In 2017, the airport received an Airport Sponsor of the Year award from the Michigan Department of Transportation to recognize sustained excellence in service to the aviation community through the development of numerous airport improvement and infrastructure preservation projects. This award was specifically granted to recognize the airport's efforts in building the Airport Business Center and Aircraft Apron projects.

The airport received new funds for upgrades through the FAA's Airport Improvement Program in 2019.

== Activities ==
The airport hosted an Aviation Day in partnership with Wings of Mercy in 2022. It included a pancake breakfast, a 5K race on the airport's runway, and free airplane rides sponsored by the EAA Young Eagles.

In 2021, the airport was a stop on the Civil Air Patrol's Operation Good Cheer to deliver gifts to children in need in the area.

== Facilities and aircraft ==
West Michigan Regional Airport covers an area of 432 acres (175 ha) at an elevation of 698 feet (213 m) above mean sea level. It has one runway designated 8/26 with an asphalt surface measuring 6,002 by 100 feet (1,829 x 30 m). Passenger loading is from the tarmac. Flights range from light sport aircraft to business jets; it has no regularly scheduled commercial flights. A full-service fixed-base operator (FBO) offers aircraft rental, flight instruction, charter flights, and aircraft maintenance.

The airport has two public viewing areas. One is located near the southwest corner of the airport (accessed from 64th Street), and the other is located on the northeast corner of the airport (accessed from Lincoln Avenue). Both are paved and equipped with a picnic table.

There is a fixed-base operator at the operator which sells fuel and provides general maintenance, courtesy transportation, rental cars, a conference rooms, a crew lounge, snooze rooms, and other amenities.

For the 12-month period ending December 31, 2021, the airport had 35,000 aircraft operations, an average of 96 per day: 94% general aviation, 6% air taxi, and 1% military. At that time there were 49 aircraft based at this airport: 29 single-engine and seven multi-engine airplanes, as well as 13 jets.

== See also ==
- List of airports in Michigan
