= List of shipwrecks in November 1886 =

The list of shipwrecks in November 1886 includes ships sunk, foundered, grounded, or otherwise lost during November 1886.

== 1 November ==
List of shipwrecks: 1 November 1886
Ship	State	Description
Arklow	United Kingdom	The fishing lugger was discovered by the Coastguard off the Old Head of Kinsale, County Cork. She was towed in to Oyster Haven, County Cork.
Darien, and E. F. Sawyer	United Kingdom; United States	The ship E. F. Sawyer collided with a pontoon and the steamship Darien at Antwerp, Belgium and was severely damaged. Darien was driven into the steamship Strassburg (Germany) and was also severely damaged.
Italia	Flag unknown	The steamship ran aground at Middlesbrough, Yorkshire, United Kingdom. She was on a voyage from Middlesbrough to Cardiff, Glamorgan, United Kingdom. She was refloated.
Norvegia	Norway	The barque was run into by the barque Dundale (United Kingdom) at Penarth, Glamorgan and was severely damaged. She was taken in to Cardiff for repairs.
Prins Hendrik	Netherlands	The steamship was run down and sunk at Aden, Aden Governorate by the steamship Hubbock (United Kingdom). She was refloated in mid-November.

== 2 November ==
List of shipwrecks: 2 November 1886
Ship	State	Description
Brilliant	United Kingdom	The ship was run into by the steamship Huntsman (United Kingdom) in the River Mersey and became waterlogged.
Myles	Canada	The steamer was sunk on a reef, today known as Myles Shoal, in the harbour of Kingston, Ontario. She was refloated on 20 April 1887. Subsequently repaired and returned to service.

== 3 November ==
List of shipwrecks: 3 November 1886
Ship	State	Description
Aunus	France	The steamship collided with Earl of Rosebery (United Kingdom) off Penarth, Glamorgan, United Kingdom and became severely leaky. She was on a voyage from La Rochelle, Charente-Inférieure to Cardiff, Glamorgan.
Scotia	United Kingdom	The barquentine was driven ashore at Dungeness, Kent. She was on a voyage from the West Indies to London. She was refloated and taken into London by the tug Challenger (United Kingdom).

== 4 November ==
List of shipwrecks: 4 November 1886
Ship	State	Description
Ellen Spry	United States	The schooner sprung a leak and sank in the Great Lakes.
Raleigh's Cross	United Kingdom	The steamship ran aground on the wreck of Mysotis (Flag unknown) at Bilbao, Spain. Six would-be rescuers were drowned when their boat capsized. Raleigh's Cross subsequently became a wreck.
Sophie	Norway	The ship was driven ashore at Farsund. She was refloated with assistance and found to be severely leaky.

== 5 November ==
List of shipwrecks: 5 November 1886
Ship	State	Description
City of Cheboygan	United States	The schooner was sunk or wrecked at DeTour Village, Michigan. Refloated in June 1887, repaired and returned to service.
Detroit	United States	The schooner was wrecked on Summer Island, Michigan, or on Skillagalee Reef, near Beaver Island.
M. Stalker	United States	The schooner was rammed and sunk while anchored 3 nautical miles (5.6 km) off Mackinaw City, Michigan (45°47′N 84°41′W) in a storm by Severn or Muskoka (Flags unknown). The wreck was located in 1967.
Ocean Bride	United Kingdom	The barque ran aground on the West Sunk Bank, in the North Sea and was wrecked. Her crew were rescued by the Clacton Lifeboat. She was on a voyage from South Shields, County Durham to Granville, Manche, France.
Queen Victoria	United Kingdom	The ship was driven ashore at Dovercourt, Essex. She was refloated on 7 November and taken in to Harwich, Essex in a severely leaky condition.

== 6 November ==
List of shipwrecks: 6 November 1886
Ship	State	Description
A D Gilber	United Kingdom	The schooner stranded near Chipiona, Spain and became a total wreck.
Hallamshire	United Kingdom	The steamship ran aground near Kabret, Egypt. She was on a voyage from the East Indies to a British port. She was refloated on 8 November and resumed her voyage.
Iris	Germany	The ship was abandoned in the North Sea 30 nautical miles (56 km) off Texel, North Holland, Netherlands. Her crew were rescued by the fishing vessel Maggie (United Kingdom). Iris was on a voyage from Brake to Ipswich, Suffolk, United Kingdom.
Janet Duncan	United Kingdom	Attempting to take shelter at Eyemouth, Berwickshire in a heavy gale (Stockton-on-Tees, County Durham for Dundee, Scotland with iron), the steamship was driven onto rocks in southern Eyemouth Bay; three crew were rescued by rocket apparatus, the remaining three were drowned.
Kalara	Queensland	The paddle steamer was holed by her anchor and sank in the Tweed River, New South Wales.
Royal Adelaide	United Kingdom	The fishing lugger was driven ashore at Folkestone, Kent.

== 7 November ==
List of shipwrecks: 7 November 1886
Ship	State	Description
Star of Tay	United Kingdom	The steam trawler was severely damaged by fire at Scarborough, Yorkshire.
Unnamed	Flag unknown	A ship foundered in the North Sea. Five crew were rescued from a boat by the steam trawler Albert Edward (United Kingdom).

== 8 November ==
List of shipwrecks: 8 November 1886
Ship	State	Description
Hercules	Germany	The brig was abandoned in the North Sea. Her crew were rescued by the steamship Knuthenborg (Denmark).
Prince of Wales	United Kingdom	The flat sprang a leak and was beached on Walney Island, Lancashire. She was on a voyage from the River Duddon to Ulverston, Lancashire.
Unnamed	Flag unknown	A ship capsized 26 nautical miles (48 km) north west of the Bishop Rock, Isles of Scilly, United Kingdom.

== 9 November ==
List of shipwrecks: 9 November 1886
Ship	State	Description
Harrington	United Kingdom	The steamship was run into by the steamship Caroline and sank in the River Thames at Gravesend, Kent. Her crew were rescued.
Unnamed	Flag unknown	A steamship foundered in the Atlantic Ocean (44°38′N 9°20′W) with the loss of all hands. Witnessed by Torbay Lass (United Kingdom).

== 10 November ==
List of shipwrecks: 10 November 1886
Ship	State	Description
Borderer	United Kingdom	The steamship ran aground in the River Thames at Newham, Essex.
Dazzle	United Kingdom	The fishing trawler collided with the fishing trawler Why Not and sank in Plymouth Sound. Her crew were rescued by Why Not.
Flyn Nilsen	Denmark	The brig was taken in to Slettestrand in a capsized and wrecked condition.
Plainmeller	United Kingdom	The steamship departed from Otaru for Yokohama, Japan. No further trace, reported missing.
Sutlej	United Kingdom	The steamship ran aground in the River Thames at Barking, Essex.

== 11 November ==
List of shipwrecks: 11 November 1886
Ship	State	Description
Eusebia	Spain	The ship was abandoned in the Atlantic Ocean (41°10′N 9°50′W). Her crew were rescued by the steamship Roumania (United Kingdom). Eusebia was on a voyage from Torrevieja to Riva de Sella.
Hero	United Kingdom	The Thames barge was run into by a steamship and sank at Thames Haven, Essex. Her three crew were reported missing.
Reaper	United Kingdom	The schooner collided with Kate (United Kingdom) and sank off Mizen Head, County Cork. Her crew were rescued by another schooner. Reaper was on a voyage from Cardiff, Glamorgan to Sligo.
Trader	United Kingdom	The barge was run into by the steamship Tay (United Kingdom) and sank in the River Thames at Gravesend, Kent with the loss of her captain.

== 12 November ==
List of shipwrecks: 12 November 1886
Ship	State	Description
Northerner	United States	The steam barge ran aground on a reef off Kelly's Island in Lake Erie. She caught fire and burned to the waterline. Rebuilt in 1887 and returned to service.

== 13 November ==
List of shipwrecks: 13 November 1886
Ship	State	Description
Anna Bella	United Kingdom	The barque was abandoned in the Bay of Biscay. Her ten crew were rescued by the steamship Iberia (United Kingdom).
Silksworth	United Kingdom	The steamship struck the Chapel Rock and was holed. She was on a voyage from Antwerp, Belgium to Sharpness, Gloucestershire. She completed her voyage waterlogged at the bow.
Snowbird	United States	The schooner was wrecked on the Great Lakes.

== 14 November ==
List of shipwrecks: 14 November 1886
Ship	State	Description
Flying Scud	United States	The schooner departed from Douglas Station near Cape Douglas Department of Alaska (57°34′10″N 154°27′30″W) for Kodiak with 26 people on board and was never heard from again. Wreckage and broken baidarkas were found weeks later, but the loss of Flying Scud did not finally become fully apparent until the spring of 1887.

== 15 November ==
List of shipwrecks: 15 November 1886
Ship	State	Description
Bertha	United Kingdom	The steamship was run into by the steamship Kampokus at Queenstown, County Cork and sank at the stern.
Skylark	United Kingdom	The lugger collided with HMS Firefly (Royal Navy) and sank in the North Sea. Her crew were rescued by HMS Firefly.

== 17 November ==
List of shipwrecks: 17 November 1886
Ship	State	Description
B. B. Buckout	United States	The barge ran aground in a blizzard at McDougall, Ontario, Canada.
B. M. Baker	United States	The barge ran aground in a blizzard at East Tawas, Michigan.
Belle Cross	United States	The steamship ran aground in a blizzard opposite China Beach.
City of New York	United States	The steamship ran aground in a blizzard at North Point in Hammond's Bay, near Cheboygan, Michigan.
Cuyahoga	United States	The schooner ran aground in a blizzard in North Bay.
David Wallace	United States	The schooner barge, being towed by Robert Wallace (flag unknown), ran aground in a blizzard at Chocolay, Michigan, sinking the next day. She was later raised, repaired and returned to service.
Emerald	United States	The barge foundered in a blizzard near Kewaunee, Wisconsin with the loss of five of her crew.
F. M. Dickinson	United States	The barge foundered in a blizzard near Kewaunee. Two crewmen and the female cook were lost.
Florida	United States	The schooner slipped her anchor and was dashed to pieces against a dock at Marquette, Michigan in a blizzard. Her mate was crushed between her hull and the hull of the rescue tug Gilett (United States).
Golden	United States	The schooner ran aground in a blizzard below China Beach.
Golden Harvest	United States	The barge ran aground in a blizzard at East Tawas.
Harvey Bissell	United States	The schooner barge ran aground in a blizzard near Alpena, Michigan. She was refloated and returned to service.
Helen	United States	The schooner foundered in a blizzard on Lake Michigan about three miles (4.8 km) north of the Muskegon channel. Lost with all hands, four crewmen, her captain and his wife.
Lingard	Norway	The barque was wrecked on a reef 12 nautical miles (22 km) south south west of the South Point Lighthouse, Barbados. Her eleven crew survived. She was on a voyage from Rio de Janeiro, Brazil to Barbados.
L. J. Conway	United States	The schooner was wrecked in a blizzard near Frankfort, Michigan. Lost with all hands.
Mary	Canada	The schooner ran aground in a blizzard near Blenheim, Ontario.
Nashua	United States	The steamship ran aground in a blizzard near Grass Island in Green Bay.
Nelson Mills	United States	The schooner ran aground in a blizzard in the St. Clair River.
P. S. March	United States	The schooner ran aground in a blizzard on St. Ignace, Michigan.
Pathfinder	United States	The schooner ran aground in a blizzard near Rawley Point, Two Rivers, Wisconsin. She broke up over the next several days.
Robert Wallace	United States	The steamship ran aground in a blizzard at Chocolay four miles (6.4 km) east of Marquette, sinking the next day. Raised, repaired and returned to service.
South Haven	United States	The schooner ran aground in a blizzard near Sherman's Point, Ontario, Canada (44°10′N 77°06′W).
Star of the North	United States	The barge foundered in a blizzard near East Tawas.
HMS Swallow	Royal Navy	The Nymphe-class sloop ran aground off Yarmouth, Isle of Wight. She was refloated and taken in to Plymouth, Devon.
Thomas P. Sheldon	United States	The schooner went aground in a blizzard at Oscoda, Michigan, later sinking off Fish Point after being cut loose by her tug. Apparently raised, repaired and returned to service.
Tonawanda	United States	The barge ran aground in a blizzard at McDougall.
William Jones	United States	The schooner was driven ashore in a blizzard on Little Sable Point, south of Pentwater, Michigan.
Unnamed	Flag unknown	A schooner ran aground in a blizzard at St. Ignace.
Two unnamed vessels	United States	Two scows were driven ashore in a blizzard in North Bay.

== 18 November ==
List of shipwrecks: 18 November 1886
Ship	State	Description
Australia	United Kingdom	The steamship ran aground in the River Thames downstream of Gravesend, Kent.
European	United Kingdom	The brig was wrecked on the Cross Sand, in the North Sea off the coast of Norfolk with the loss of three of her eight crew. She was on a voyage from Sunderland, County Durham to Bastia, Corsica, France.
Hanna Butler	Canada	The schooner was wrecked in Weller's Bay off Stoney Point, Ontario after rescuing the crew rescued by Ida Walker ( Canada). All on board rescued a day later by the Wellington Lifeboat.
Ida Walker	Canada	The schooner dragged anchor in a blizzard and was wrecked on a reef in Weller's Bay. Broke in two the next day. Her crew were rescued by Hanna Butler ( Canada).
John G. Kolfage	Canada	The schooner ran aground in a blizzard near Goderich, Ontario.
Lucerne	United States	The schooner sank in a gale/snowstorm in Chequamegon Bay, Lake Superior off the north side of Long Island at La Pointe, Wisconsin, with the loss of all hands.
Marinette	United States	The schooner, under tow by Manistique (United States), lost her tow in a blizzard on Lake Michigan and was wrecked four miles (6.4 km) south of Frankfort, Michigan (44°32′N 86°13′W) with the loss of all but one of her crew.
Pathfinder	United States	While under tow by the steam barge Jim Sheriffs (United States) and carrying a cargo of 1,200 tons of iron ore, the three-masted schooner broke her towline in a gale and snowstorm and ran aground in Lake Michigan on the coast of Wisconsin 2.5 miles (4 km) north of Two Rivers. Her crew abandoned ship in a yawl and rowed to safety aboard Jim Sheriffs. Pathfinder broke up a few days later. Her wreck lies in 15 feet (4.6 m) of water at 44°14.429′N 087°30.397′W in the Wisconsin Shipwreck Coast National Marine Sanctuary.
Queen of the Lakes	Canada	The schooner was wrecked on Stoney Point, Ontario. Reportedly went to pieces, but was pulled off in 1887 and taken to Kingston, Ontario, repaired and returned to service.

== 19 November ==
List of shipwrecks: 19 November 1886
Ship	State	Description
Buncrana	United Kingdom	The barquentine was wrecked on a coral reef. Her seven crew survived.
Menekaunee	United States	The schooner, under tow by Manistique (United States), lost her tow in a blizzard on Lake Michigan on 18 November and was wrecked four miles (6.4 km) south of Frankfort, Michigan the next day. The vessel was lost with all hands.

== 20 November ==
List of shipwrecks: 20 November 1886
Ship	State	Description
Engineer	United Kingdom	The steamship was wrecked on "Andrea Cellia Island", in the Red Sea. She was abandoned on 25 November. She was on a voyage from Cagliari, Sardinia, Italy to Massowah, Eritrea.
Thames	United Kingdom	The schooner struck the Scarweather Sands in the Bristol Channel and consequently foundered off The Mumbles, Glamorgan. Her crew survived. She was on a voyage from Port Talbot, Glamorgan to Bilbao, Spain.

== 24 November ==
List of shipwrecks: 24 November 1886
Ship	State	Description
Comeragh, and Ossian	United Kingdom	The steamship ran aground in the River Avon. She was on a voyage from Waterford to Bristol, Gloucestershire. She was refloated but collided with the steamship Ossian, which had to be beached.Ossian was on a voyage from Bristol to the Charente. She was refloated and put back to Bristol.
HMS Serapis	Royal Navy	The Euphrates-class troopship ran aground at Southsea, Hampshire. She was on a voyage from Suez, Egypt to Portsmouth, Hampshire. She was refloated with assistance from two tugs and taken in to Portsmouth.
Unnamed	United Kingdom	A fishing boat capsized off Helmsdale, Sutherland with the loss of four of her six crew.

== 25 November ==
List of shipwrecks: 25 November 1886
Ship	State	Description
Maria	Greece	The schooner collided with the steamship Ben Voirlich (United Kingdom) and sank in Greek waters. Maria was on a voyage from Brăila, Romania to Cephalonia.
Mary Ann	United Kingdom	The Thames barge was run into by the steamship Glenfruin (United Kingdom and sank in the River Thames at Woolwich, Kent.
Rutland	United Kingdom	The waterlogged barque ran aground at Greenock, Renfrewshire.
Sunbeam, and an unnamed vessel	United States	The tug suffered a boiler explosion in the East River, New York and was obliterated with the loss of all four crew. A schooner also sank with the loss of a crew member.
Telephone	United Kingdom	The tug sank in the North Sea off Cromer, Norfolk. Her crew were rescued by the pilot cutter Alpha (United Kingdom).
Unnamed	Flag unknown	A steamship was driven ashore at Atherfield, Isle of Wight, United Kingdom.

== 26 November ==
List of shipwrecks: 26 November 1886
Ship	State	Description
Rap	United Kingdom	The schooner was severely damaged by an onboard explosion at Low Walker, Northumberland. A crew member was severely wounded.

== 27 November ==
List of shipwrecks: 27 November 1886
Ship	State	Description
56S	Regia Marina	The 56S-class torpedo boat collided with the torpedo boat 57S (Regia Marina) and sank in the Bay of Biscay. Her crew were rescued.
Oregon	United States	The steamship collided with the steamship Alaska (United States) and was beached on Bois Blanc Island, Ontario, Canada. She was refloated on 29 November and taken in to Detroit, Michigan for repairs.
Richmond	United States	The steamship was destroyed by fire at the mouth of the Black River with the loss of two of her crew.

== 28 November ==
List of shipwrecks: 28 November 1886
Ship	State	Description
Bayswater	United Kingdom	The steamship was holed by her anchor at Madeira and became waterlogged at the bow.
Josephine Marie	France	The ship departed from Luçon, Vendée for the Bristol Channel. No further trace, reported overdue.
Widgeon	United Kingdom	The steamship was run into by the steamship Falcon and sank in the River Thames at London. She was refloated and taken in to Greenwich, Kent.

== 29 November ==
List of shipwrecks: 29 November 1886
Ship	State	Description
Alfred P. Wright	United States	The tug went aground on a beach 3 nautical miles (5.6 km) north of Manistee, Michigan and was abandoned. Her crew were rescued.
Anne Levine	United Kingdom	The ship departed from Safi, Morocco for a British port. No further trace, reported missing.
Félicité	France	The smack was driven ashore at Cardiff, Glamorgan, United Kingdom. She was refloated with assistance from the tug John Bull (United Kingdom).
Narayana	Norway	The barque was driven ashore and wrecked on Coney Island, County Sligo, United Kingdom. Her crew survived. She was on a voyage from the Saint Lawrence River to Ayr, United Kingdom.
Otteren	Norway	The barque was abandoned at sea. Her crew were rescued by Montgomeryshire (United Kingdom). Otteren was on a voyage from Cardiff to Santos, Brazil. The ship Otteren was abandoned at the height of Madeira on 29 November 1886 according to handwritten recommendation letter from captain Ferdinand Pande to deckman Oscar Bengtsson. The letter was written on 17 December 1886 onboard the rescuing ship Montgomeryshire.

== 30 November ==
List of shipwrecks: 30 November 1886
Ship	State	Description
Arundel	United States	The schooner, under tow of Maggie Marshall (Canada), went aground on a beach three miles (4.8 km) south of Manistee, Michigan. Her crew were rescued.
B. F. Farnham	United States	The schooner was driven ashore on the Isla de Mujures, Mexico. She was on a voyage from Puerto Cortés, Honduras to New York. She was refloated and taken in to Progresso, Mexico in a leaky condition.
Carthage	United States	The fishing schooner departed from Gloucester, Massachusetts for the Georges Bank. No further trace, lost with all twelve crew.
Cranbrook	United Kingdom	The steamship departed from Newport, Monmouthshire for Baltimore, Maryland, United States. No further trace, presumed foundered with the loss of all hands.
Maggie Marshall	Canada	The steamer went aground on a beach three miles (4.8 km) south of Manistee, Michigan. Her crew were rescued. She was refloated and returned to service.
Unnamed	Flag unknown	A barque caught fire in the English Channel 18 nautical miles (33 km) north east by north of Cap La Hougue, Manche, France.

== Unknown date ==
List of shipwrecks: Unknown date in November 1886
Ship	State	Description
Ahus	Sweden	The schooner was driven ashore at Kalmar. She was on a voyage from Blyth, Northumberland, United Kingdom to Westervik.
Alert	Norway	The brig foundered at sea. Her crew were rescued. She was on a voyage from an English port to Odense, Denmark.
Alice M. Minot	United States	The ship was destroyed by fire. She was on a voyage from West Point to Liverpool, Lancashire, United Kingdom.
Anna	(Russian Empire) Grand Duchy of Finland	The schooner was driven ashore on Skagen, Denmark.
Anna Camp	Norway	The barque ran aground at Maassluis, South Holland, Netherlands. She was on a voyage from Philadelphia, Pennsylvania, United States to Rotterdam, South Holland. She was refloated.
Anna Olga	Russia	The schooner was driven ashore at "Takona". She was on a voyage from Saint Petersburg to Ystad, Sweden.
Anna Victoria	Russia	The schooner was driven ashore on Læsø, Denmark. She was on a voyage from Amsterdam, North Holland, Netherlands to Randers, Norway. She was refloated with assistance and taken in to Fredrikshavn, Denmark.
Apollo	Germany	The steamship was driven ashore at Blyth. She was refloated but consequently sank.
Arcona	Germany	The brig was driven ashore on Saltholm, Denmark. She was later refloated and resumed her voyage.
Ariadne	Norway	The barque ran aground at Gothenburg, Sweden. She was on a voyage from Middlesbrough, Yorkshire, United Kingdom to Varberg, Sweden. She was refloated and found to be leaky.
Batoum	Russia	The steamship was run down and sunk in the Sea of Marmara by the steamship Danish Prince (United Kingdom) with the loss of six lives.
Belair	United Kingdom	The steamship ran aground near Belize City, British Honduras. She was later refloated and resumed her voyage in a leaky condition.
Beresford	United Kingdom	The ship was damaged by fire at New Orleans, Louisiana, United States.
Bergliot	United Kingdom	The ship was destroyed by fire at Bermuda. She was on a voyage from New York, United States to Liverpool.
Brambletye	United Kingdom	The full-rigged ship was driven ashore in the Nieuw Diep. She was on a voyage from Calcutta, Bombay, India to Amsterdam.
Brazilianeren	Norway	The brig ran aground at Avilés, Spain.
Canada	United Kingdom	The ship was driven ashore at Métis, Quebec, Canada. She was on a voyage from London to Saguenay, Quebec.
Celsus	United Kingdom	The steamship was driven ashore at "Svalferort", Russia. She was on a voyage from Sunderland, County Durham to Riga, Russia. She was a total loss.
Charles S. Parnell	Flag unknown	The ship was driven onto a reef at Richibucto, New Brunswick, Canada. She was a total loss.
Consecretia	Germany	The schooner was driven ashore at Näsby, Öland, Sweden.
Cygnet	United Kingdom	The steamship was driven ashore. She was refloated on 26 November and taken in to Penarth, Glamorgan.
Delphin	Russia	The schooner ran aground off "Dracko". She was on a voyage from Newcastle upon Tyne, Northumberland, United Kingdom to Libava, Courland Governorate.
Der Dritte Julli	Germany	The barque was driven ashore on Skagen.
Dewdrop	United Kingdom	The steamship ran aground at Kastrup, Denmark.
Dortia	Denmark	The schooner was abandoned in the Skaggerak before 7 November.
Druid, and Henrietta H.	United Kingdom	The steamship Henrietta H. broke from her moorings and was driven into the steamship Druid at Barcelona, Spain. Both vessels were severely damaged.
Drumadoon	United Kingdom	The barque was destroyed by fire at Galveston, Texas.
Dunnorthen Castle	United Kingdom	The barque was wrecked on a reef in the Pacific Ocean 2,000 nautical miles (3,700 km) off Honolulu, Kingdom of Hawaii. Eight crew took to a boat and sailed to Honolulu. Fate of the rest of the crew, who remained on the wreck, unknown.
E	United Kingdom	The lighter was driven ashore at Queensferry, in the Firth of Forth. She was on a voyage from Leith, Lothian to Glasgow, Renfrewshire. She was refloated and towed in to Leith, Lothian in a severely leaky condition.
Eberstein	Germany	The steamship was driven ashore at Breaksea Point, Glamorgan. She was refloated and towed in to Penarth.
Edgar	United Kingdom	The steamship ran aground in the Danube 17 nautical miles (31 km) from its mouth.
Elizabeth Charlotta	United Kingdom	The schooner was driven ashore near "Udbyhoi", Norway. She was on a voyage from Harburg, Germany to Randers.
Ellen Catherine	United Kingdom	The schooner was driven ashore at Gibraltar.
Elmfield	United Kingdom	The steamship was damaged by an onboard explosion at Saint Thomas, Virgin Islands.
Energy	United Kingdom	The Thames barge collided with the steamship Admiral (United Kingdom) and sank in the River Thames at Rosherville, Kent.
Eschot	United Kingdom	The brig was driven ashore at "Micheau", Nova Scotia, Canada.
Europa	Germany	The steamship was damaged by an onboard explosion at Port Said, Egypt. She was on a voyage from PenarthPenarth to Colombo, Ceylon.
Flora Isabella	United Kingdom	The smack collided with another vessel 5 nautical miles (9.3 km) off the Kentish Knock and became leaky.
Formica	Austria-Hungary	The schooner foundered off Pula with the loss of two lives. She was on a voyage from Cyprus to Port-Vendres, Pyrénées-Orientales, France.
Freden	Norway	The barque ran aground off "Scarcia", Sierra Leone. She was refloated in early December.
George C. Roberts	United Kingdom	The brigantine was wrecked on the North Highland Reef. Her crew survived.
George R. Roberts	United Kingdom	The schooner was wrecked on The Maidens, off the coast of County Antrim. She was on a voyage from Ayr to Belfast, County Antrim.
Giovannino M.	Italy	The barque was wrecked on Grand Cayman, Cayman Islands. Her crew were rescued. She was on a voyage from Buenos Aires, Argentina to Pensacola, Florida, United States.
Graphic	United Kingdom	The steamship was driven ashore in the River Thames at Greenhithe, Kent.
Greyhound	United Kingdom	The steamship was driven ashore in the Hainan Strait.
Harvest	United Kingdom	The steamship collided with the steamship Prinses Marie (Netherlands) in the Nordzeekanaal and was severely damaged.
Hispania	Netherlands	The steamship ran aground at Maassluis. She was on a voyage from Bilbao, Spain to Rotterdam. She was refloated.
Horseguards	United Kingdom	The steamship was damaged by fire at Charleston, South Carolina, United States.
Ironton	United States	The steam barge sank in Lake Superior at L'Anse, Michigan in early November.
Isabella Blyth	United Kingdom	The ship ran aground on the St. Thomas Shoal. She was on a voyage from Quebec City to Saguenay.
Ithuriel	United Kingdom	The barque ran aground in the River Thames at the Mucking Lighthouse.
Jeanette	Denmark	The brig was abandoned in the Bay of Biscay. Her crew were rescued by a Swedish barque.
John Gibson	United Kingdom	The barque was driven ashore on the coast of Florida. She was on a voyage from Pensacola, Florida to Rosario, Brazil. She was refloated and taken in to Havana, Cuba in a leaky condition.
Juno	United Kingdom	The ship sprang a leak and was beached in the River Mersey. She was on a voyage from Belize City to Goole, Yorkshire.
Kimberley	United Kingdom	The steamship was driven ashore in the River Thames at Rising Sun Point, Essex. She was on a voyage from London to New Orleans. She was refloated and put in to Gravesend, Kent.
Lady Ernestine	United Kingdom	The schooner was driven ashore and wrecked at Sizewell, Suffolk. Her crew were rescued by the Southwold Lifeboat. She was on a voyage from Newcastle upon Tyne to Plymouth, Devon.
Lingard	Norway	The barque was driven ashore and wrecked on Barbados.
Lizzie May	United Kingdom	The ship ran aground and was beached at the Mumbles, Glamorgan.
Lord O'Neill	United Kingdom	The steamship ran aground in the River Laggan. She was refloated on 18 November.
Loch Trool	United Kingdom	The ship ran aground at Hull, Yorkshire. She was on a voyage from San Francisco, California, United States to Hull. She was refloated on 3 November.
Louise	Norway	The barque was driven ashore at Ronehamn, Sweden. She was on a voyage from Hudiksvall, Sweden to Cherbourg, Manche, France.
Lovisa	Norway	The barque was driven ashore on Gotland, Sweden. Her crew were rescued. She was on a voyage from Eggesund, Sweden to Cherbourg.
Lubrene	United States	The schooner was lost in the blizzard of 17–19 November near Ashland, Illinois. Eight lives were lost.
Lucia B.	Austria-Hungary	The barque was towed in to Lisbon, Portugal in a waterlogged condition by the steamship Danos (United Kingdom). Lucia B. was on a voyage from Chatham, New Brunswick to Bristol, Gloucestershire, United Kingdom.
Maas	Netherlands	The steamship collided with the steamship Nettlesworth (United Kingdom) at Cuxhaven, Germany. Maas became waterlogged at the bow and ran aground.
Magdalena	Spain	The ship was driven ashore and damaged at Vinaròs.
Maggie	United Kingdom	The schooner was driven ashore at Nexø, Denmark. She was on a voyage from Fraserburgh, Aberdeenshire to Danzig, Germany.
Margaret Murray	United Kingdom	The ship was driven ashore in the Rio Grande. She was later refloated.
Mary Brown	United Kingdom	The schooner was lost off Baccalieu Island, Newfoundland Colony with the loss of three of her six crew.
Mary Nixon	United Kingdom	The steamship was driven ashore at Roath, Glamorgan.
Māwhera	New Zealand	The ship was driven ashore at Greymouth.
Medbor	United Kingdom	The ship was lost whilst on a voyage from Cardiff to Maranhão, Brazil. Her crew were rescued.
Mercur	Germany	The galiot foundered in the North Sea. Her crew were rescued.
Michael Krohn	Norway	The steamship sank off Cette, Hérault, France.
Normandie	Flag unknown	The steamship foundered off "Passima", Japan with the loss of 60 of the 72 people on board. She was on a voyage from Japan to the United States.
Northcote	United Kingdom	The steamship was driven ashore at "Alsoarne", Sweden.
North Sea	United Kingdom	The steamship was driven ashore at "Aquilas".
Nostra Signora del Carmelo	Italy	The ship was driven ashore at Coombe. She was on a voyage from Cardiff, Glamorgan to Buenos Aires. She was refloated and put back to Cardiff.
Ocean Pride	(United Kingdom of Great Britain and Ireland) Guernsey	The schooner was wrecked on the West Sunk Sand, in the North Sea off the coast of Essex. Her crew were rescued by the Clacton Lifeboat.
P. G.	United Kingdom	The brig was driven ashore and wrecked at Dénia, Spain.
Pearl	United Kingdom	The ship was driven ashore in the Carimon Islands. She was a total loss.
Persian Monarch	United Kingdom	The steamship was driven ashore at Portland, Dorset. She was later refloated, arriving at Millwall, Middlesex on 7 November.
Pontyprid	United Kingdom	The steamship was driven ashore at IJmuiden, North Holland. She was on a voyage from Brăila, Romania to Amsterdam. She was refloated.
Rask	Norway	The brig was driven ashore in the Marquesas Islands. She was on a voyage from Laguna to Havre de Grâce, Seine-Inférieure, France. She was later refloated.
Roma	Flag unknown	The barque caught fire at Alexandria, Egypt and was towed out of port.
Roxburgh Castle	United Kingdom	The steamship ran aground at Maassluis. She was on a voyage from Odesa, Russia to Rotterdam. She was refloated.
Saghalien	France	The steamship collided with the steamship City of Peking (United Kingdom) at Hong Kong and was beached. She was refloated.
Schwanette	Germany	The galiot collided with another vessel. She was towed in to Flekkefjord, Norway in a waterlogged condition.
Snowdon	Russia	The barque was taken in to Tenby, Pembrokeshire, United Kingdom in a derelict condition. She was on a voyage from Port Royal, South Carolina, United States to Belfast. It was subsequently established that all seventeen crew had perished.
St. Dunstan	United Kingdom	The ship ran aground on the Ebbles. She was on a voyage from India to Hull. She was refloated on 20 November and taken in to Hull.
Stephanotis	United Kingdom	The steamship ran aground at Maassluis. She was refloated with assistance and towed back to Rotterdam in a leaky condition.
Stephen and Sarah	United Kingdom	The schooner was driven ashore at Thames Haven, Essex. She was on a voyage from Whitstable, Kent to Grays, Essex.
St. Thomas	United Kingdom	The steamship sprang a leak and sank in the North Sea 10 nautical miles (19 km) north east of the Dudgeon Sandbank. Her crew were rescued by the smack Gazelle (United Kingdom). St. Thomas was on a voyage from Dundee, Forfarshire to London.
Sulina	United Kingdom	The steamship ran aground and was wrecked 3 nautical miles (5.6 km) off Cape Sable Island, Nova Scotia. She was on a voyage from Antwerp, Belgium to Boston, Massachusetts, United States.
Surprise	United Kingdom	The schooner ran aground on the Blyth Sand. She was on a voyage from Woodbridge, Suffolk to London.
Takala-Maru	China	The steamship foundered off "Neegata", Japan with the loss of 95 of the 96 people on board. She was on a voyage from Hakodate, Japan to Neegata.
Tchihatchoff	Russia	The steamship ran aground on the Dohoaslan Shoal.
Theodore Korner	United Kingdom	The full-rigged ship was destroyed by fire at Philadelphia, Pennsylvania.
Torfaeus	United Kingdom	The barque was wrecked near Piombino, Italy.
Unita	Norway	The barque was driven ashore at Ronehamn. She was on a voyage from Riga, Russia to a Dutch port.
Vancouver	United Kingdom	The ship was wrecked on the Manicougan Shoals. She was on a voyage from Quebec City to Londonderry.
Vandyck	Flag unknown	The ship was driven ashore at The Battery, New York. She was on a voyage from New York to Liverpool.
Volunteer	United Kingdom	The schooner was driven ashore at Hornsea, Yorkshire. Her five crew were rescued by rocket apparatus. She was on a voyage from London to Dundee.
Washisti	Flag unknown	The ship ran aground on the Vizadrug Rocks and was wrecked.
W. C. Warren	United States	The ship was driven ashore in the Squan Inlet and became hogged. She was on a voyage from Demerara, British Guiana to New York.
Webfoot	United Kingdom	The barque was destroyed by fire off Cape Flattery, Washington, United States. She was on a voyage from the Puget Sound to Callao, Peru.
Whitburn	United Kingdom	The steamship was driven ashore at Cape Cavello, Sardinia, Italy.
Yuca	United Kingdom	The barque was destroyed by fire at sea. Her crew were rescued. She was on a voyage from South Shields, County Durham to Valparaíso, Chile.
Zulu Chief	United Kingdom	The barque foundered at sea. She was on a voyage from the Clyde to Pernambuco, Brazil.
Two unnamed vessels	Flags unknown	Two schooners were wrecked at Rimouski, Quebec.
