= Mears State Park =

Park in Michigan, USA

Charles Mears State Park
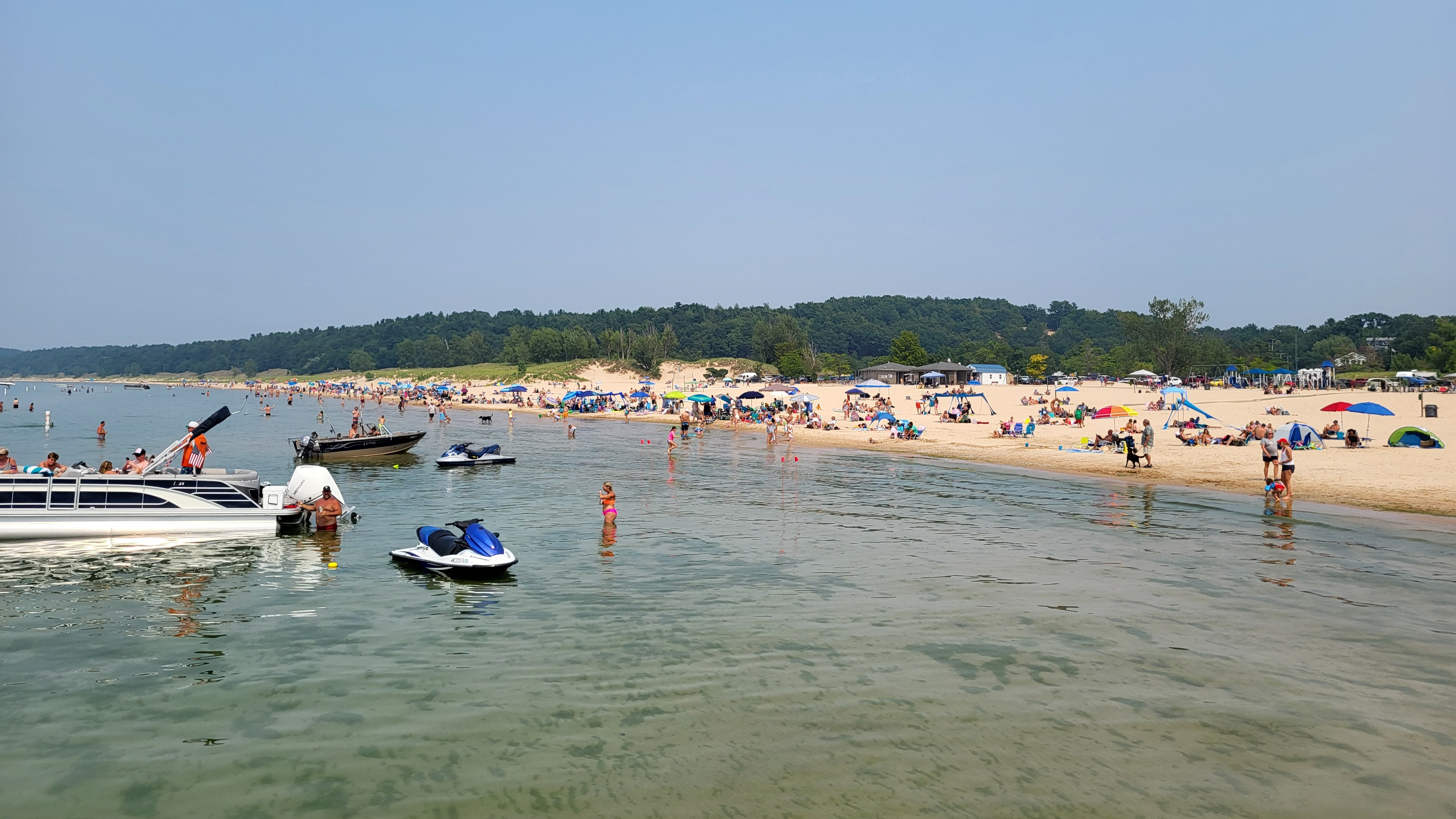
- Beachfront along Lake Michigan

- Location within Michigan Location within the United States
- Location: Pentwater, Michigan, United States
- Coordinates: 43°47′00″N 86°26′26″W
- Area: 50 acres (20 ha)
- Elevation: 610 feet (190 m)
- Established: 1920
- Administrator: Michigan Department of Natural Resources
- Designation: Michigan state park
- Website: Official website

Charles Mears State Park is a public recreation area in the village of Pentwater, Oceana County, Michigan. The state park encompasses 50 acres (20 ha) on the north side of the channel that connects Lake Michigan and Pentwater Lake.

== History ==
Mears State Park was among 13 parks established in 1920 following the creation of the Michigan State Parks Commission a year earlier. The park land, which was once owned by lumber baron Charles Mears, was donated to the state by his daughter Carrie Mears. The park originally comprised only 16 acres "strictly made up of lake sand." In 1921, the vegetation that held the sand in place was disturbed during a grading process, resulting in a loss of sand to the winds, much to the annoyance of neighboring dwellers. To cure the man-made problem, five tons of marsh hay were "evenly distributed and disked in." A toilet and fireplaces were also constructed.

== Activities and amenities ==
In addition to fishing, swimming, camping, and picnicking, the park offers a one-mile (1.6 km) hiking trail that ascends the Old Baldy sand dune. The park also includes the Pentwater North Pierhead Light, which is listed on the National Register of Historic Places.
