= Kalara (disambiguation) =

Kalara may refer to:

- Kalara, a town in West Bengal, India
- Kalara, Bhopal, a village in Madhya Pradesh, India
- Kalara International Properties, a company of Thailand
- PS Kalara, a paddle steam vessel which sunk off Tweed Heads, Australia
