= Charles Mears Silver Lake Boardinghouse =

- U.S. National Register of Historic Places
- Michigan State Historic Site
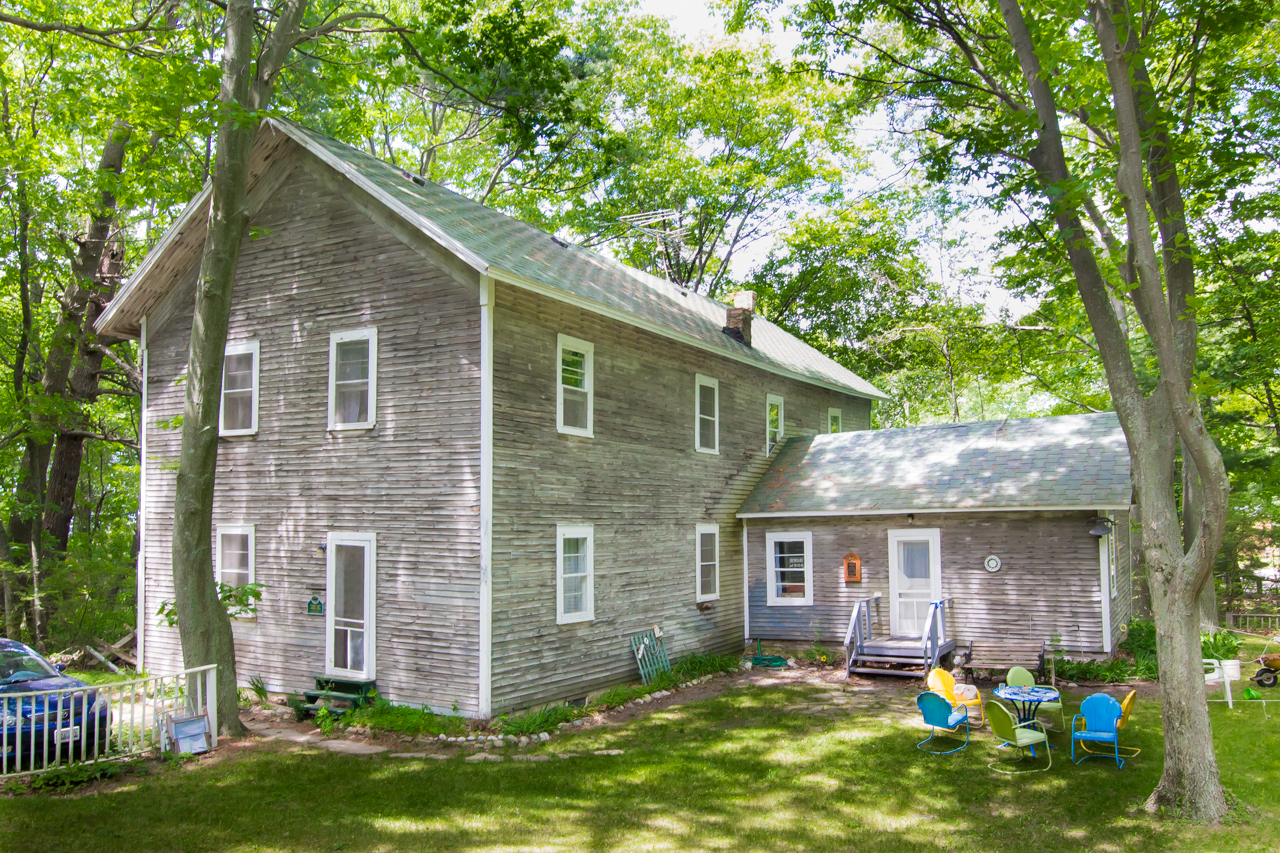

- Location within Michigan Location within the United States
- Interactive map
- Nearest city: Mears, Michigan
- Coordinates: 43°39′20″N 86°32′15″W
- Area: 1.5 acres (0.61 ha)
- Built: 1866
- NRHP reference No.: 86002115

Significant dates
- Added to NRHP: July 31, 1986
- Designated MSHS: December 5, 1986

The Charles Mears Silver Lake Boardinghouse is a boardinghouse located at the outlet of Silver Lake, near Mears, Michigan. It is one of the few remaining structures built to serve the lumbering industry, which was Michigan's predominant industry in the 19th century. It was designated a Michigan State Historic Site and listed on the National Register of Historic Places in 1986.

== History ==
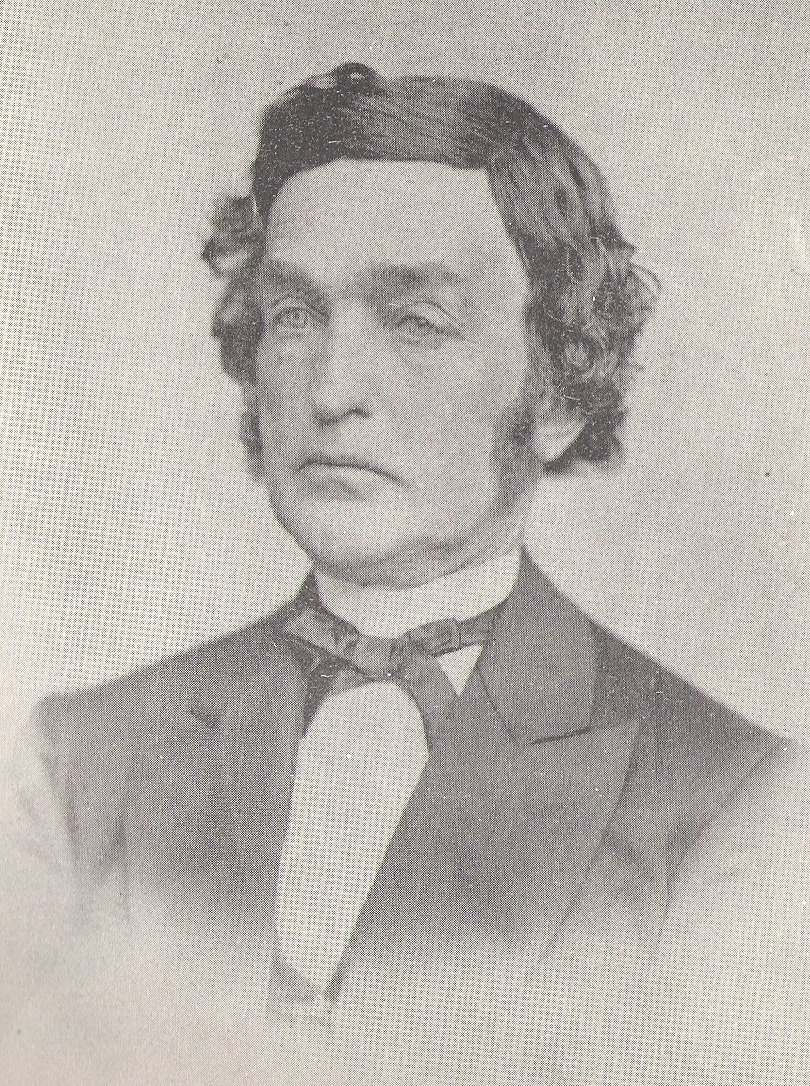
Charles Mears c. 1856

Charles Mears was born in 1814 in North Billerica, Massachusetts, the son of Nathan and Lucy Mears. In 1836, Charles and his brothers Edwin and Nathan opened a general store in Paw Paw, Michigan. The next year, Charles and another brother, Albert, began considering starting business along the west shore of Lake Michigan. Realizing the potential of the lumber trade, Charles purchased land near White Lake, Michigan, and by early 1838 had opened a sawmill nearby. Mears decided that the then small village of Chicago would be a good market for timber, and he commissioned a lumber sloop to haul lumber from his mill to Chicago.

In 1844, Mears established a second sawmill, and soon controlled timberland and owned mills across Michigan. Mears built a number of boardinghouses for his workers, as did other lumbermen. However, other lumbermen tended to build crude boardinghouses strictly for the mill hands. Mears's mills were close to Lake Michigan, and a fair amount of traffic passed. Thus, uniquely, Mears opened his boardinghouses to the general public. To attract public customers, the boardinghouses themselves were also of higher quality construction.

This boardinghouse was constructed in 1866. When the lumbering trade declined, Mears continued to operate the boardinghouse to serve the public, with his former mill foreman as the innkeeper. Mears died in 1895, and passed the boardinghouse to his daughter, Carrie Ellen Mears. She closed the boardinghouse, but retained ownership until her own death in 1957. At that time, she bequeathed the boardinghouse and surrounding land to the state of Michigan. Part of the bequest became Mears State Park, and part was added to Silver Lake State Park. Other portions were sold, including the lot on which this boardinghouse sits. The building was renovated and reopened to the public.

== Description ==
The Charles Mears Silver Lake Boardinghouse is a two-story, rectangular structure measuring 70 feet (21 m) by 28 feet (8.5 m), with a one-story wing kitchen measuring 25 feet (7.6 m) by 25 feet (7.6 m) connected to one side. The exterior is covered with clapboard, and the roof with asphalt shingles. The windows are two-over-two double hung.

On the interior, walls are lath and plaster, and the floors are of wood. There are four rooms on the main floor, two of which are large public rooms (one a sitting room and one a dining room). The two smaller rooms were originally used by the innkeeper. There are three more rooms in the kitchen wing: a kitchen, pantry, and storage room. The upper floor contains one large bunkroom for use by the mill hands and six smaller bedrooms for travelers.
