= Pentwater =

Pentwater may refer to a community in the United States:

- Pentwater, Michigan
- Pentwater Township, Michigan
