= Adolph Walter Rich =

American businessman

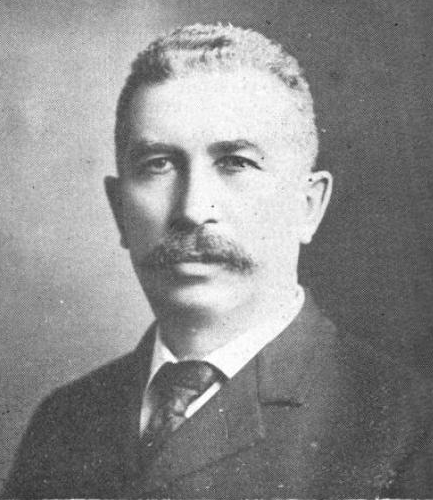

Adolph Walter Rich (27 July 1843 – 6 March 1917) was a Milwaukee manufacturer, merchant and philanthropist best known for his work in founding the Jewish agricultural colony at Arpin, Wisconsin, United States.

== Early life ==
He was born Adolphus Reich on 27 July 1843 in the town of Somos (now Sumig), in east central Hungary, the son of Emanuel Rich (ca. 1819- 24 April 1888) and Sarah H. Gladstone (ca. 1826 - ca. 1871). Soon after their arrival in the United States, the family Americanized its surname to "Rich". In later life, Rich generally used the given name “Adolph”, but in his patents and passport application styled himself “Adolphus Rich.” In Hungary, Rich learned German, Hungarian, and Hebrew, but eventually became fluent and well read in English.

When he was 10, his family left Europe, arriving at New York City on 24 October 1854 on the ship M. du Emile. In 1855 Emanuel Rich took his family to join relatives in Cleveland, Ohio. After two years in Cleveland, the family moved to Michigan. On 3 October 1857 Emanual purchased 120 acres (0.49 km^{2}) in Saginaw County, Michigan from the United States government. The land was heavily wooded and Rich worked with his father to clear the land. After three years, the family moved to nearby Owosso, in Shiawassee County, where the elder Rich made a living as a peddler. The Emanuel Rich family eventually settled in Pentwater, Michigan.

== Manufacturer ==
At the age of 17, Rich left Owosso to work as a peddler, factory hand, and eventually as a traveling salesman of eyeglasses. In 1863 he became a naturalized United States citizen. In 1865, he arrived in Milwaukee, Wisconsin and began an optical business, which soon failed. He then began the manufacture and sale of ladies' goods, particularly hoop skirts. Within six years the firm had grown to 300 employees. From 1874 to 1893 he worked in partnership with Lewis Silber, doing business as A.W. Rich and Company with their store located. on Broadway in Milwaukee. The firm handled a complete line of ladies' goods. Rich also continued as a manufacturer, increasingly specializing in the production of shoes. The A.W. Rich Shoe Company manufactured a wide range of footwear products. Perhaps their best-known project was Wigwam slippers. Which were available in black, chocolate, tan and wine colors for $10. He was eventually granted several patents for shoe design. By the 1880s he employed 800 workers and produced 2,500 pairs of shoes a day. The factory was located in a massive brick building at the corner of Reed and Water Streets in Milwaukee; the building survives and is now listed on the National Register of Historic Places. Another manufacturing enterprise was the Cream City Clothing Company begun in 1883.

== Philanthropy ==
Rich was involved in numerous charitable projects. Perhaps the best known was the Jewish agricultural colony at Arpin, in Wood County, Wisconsin. The project was assisted by The Industrial Removal Office which had been established by Baron Maurice de Hirsch. Its goal was to funnel some of the large number of newly arrived Eastern European Jews away from larger cities and into the countryside. Rich led the efforts of its Wisconsin branch, the Milwaukee Jewish Industrial Aid Society. Its aim was to settle 18 families on a 720-acre (2.9 km^{2}) tract of cutover timberland. They wanted to establish “a true Zion”, but “on a moderate scale. The first settlers arrived on 1 December 1904. In 1915, a Jewish house of worship was established. Wisconsin Public Television’s 2008 video, “Chosen Towns”, features interviews with several former residents of Arpin. The settlement at Arpin was at first successful, but the days of the successful small-scale farmer was over, and the families eventually dispersed.

Among Rich's many other charitable projects were the Hebrew Relief Organization, the Milwaukee Industrial Exposition of 1880, the Young Men's Hebrew Association, the Milwaukee Musical Society, the Provident Dispensary, and Associated Charities. He helped raise funds for the relief of the several yellow fever epidemics, the 1875 Oshkosh fire, the 1889 Johnstown flood, and the 1900 Galveston hurricane.

== Family ==
On 4 February 1871 Rich married Rosa Sidenberg (1850 – 11 November 1838). Five of the couple's eight children reached maturity. Rich was deeply interested in literature, music and the arts. He was president of two literary societies. In the 1890s, he was head of the Milwaukee Theatre Company, which performed at the Davidson Theatre. He converted the third floor of his house at 638 Astor Street into a theatre where his daughters' stage group gave amateur performances for friends and family. His third daughter, Edith Juliet Rich Isaacs, (27 March 1878 – 10 January 1876) became a noted American drama critic and long-time editor of Theatre Arts. Rich traveled extensively and wrote a series of travel letters for Milwaukee newspapers using the pen name "Lillian". Adolph W. Rich died of a heart attack on 6 March 1917 and was buried at Greenwood Cemetery in Milwaukee with his wife, several children, and his father, who had died in Pentwater in 1888.
