= Bald Head Island =

Bald Head Island may refer to:

- Bald Head Island, North Carolina
- Bald Head Island (Lake Ontario), part of Wellers Bay, a protected wildlife area in Ontario
