= Navigation Structures at Pentwater Harbor =

Navigation structures in Michigan, United States

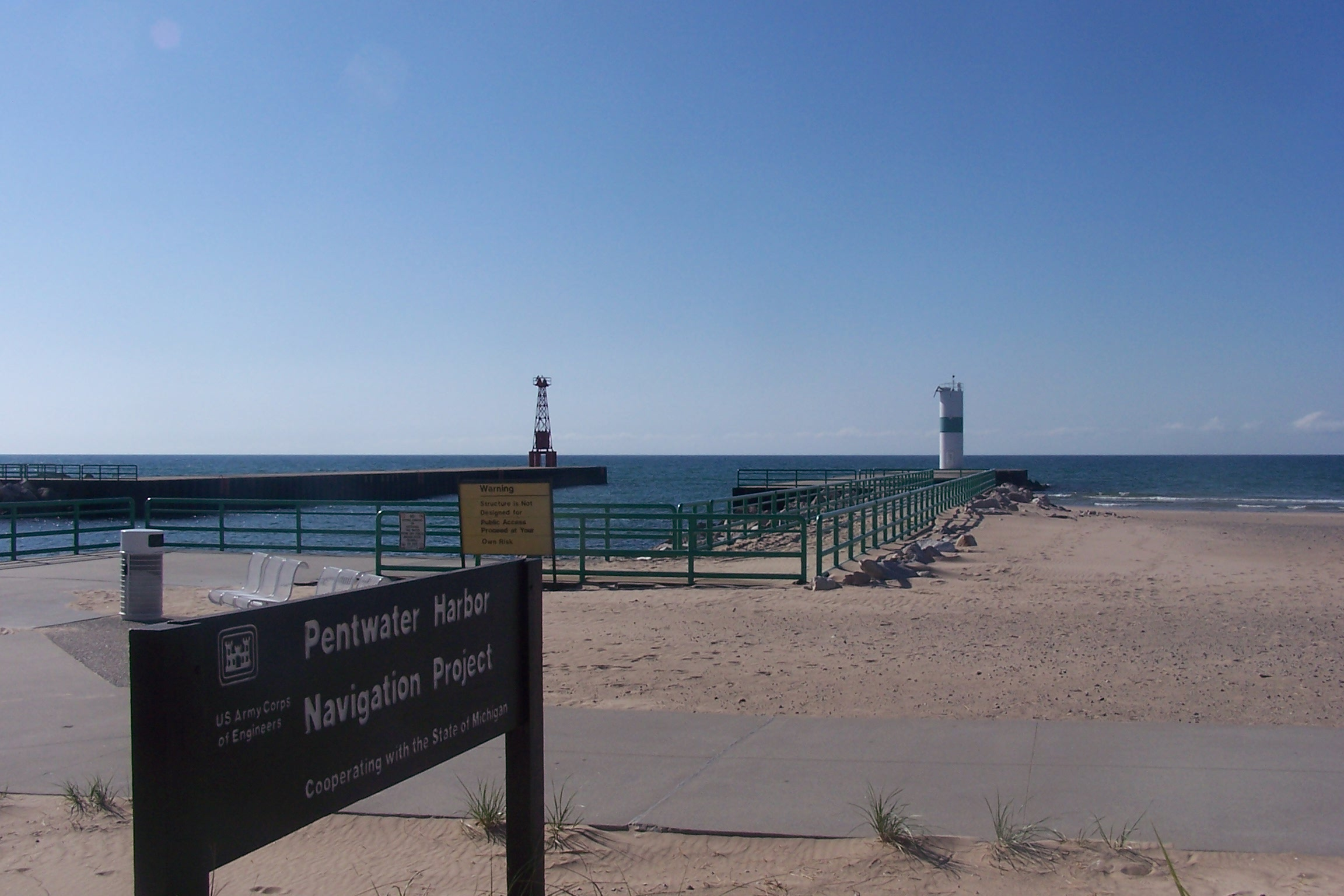
- Pentwater Pier, showing south (left) and north (right) pierhead lights
- Location: Pentwater, Michigan, United States
- Coordinates: 43°47′N 86°26′W
- Heritage: National Register of Historic Places listed place
- Pentwater North Pierhead Light
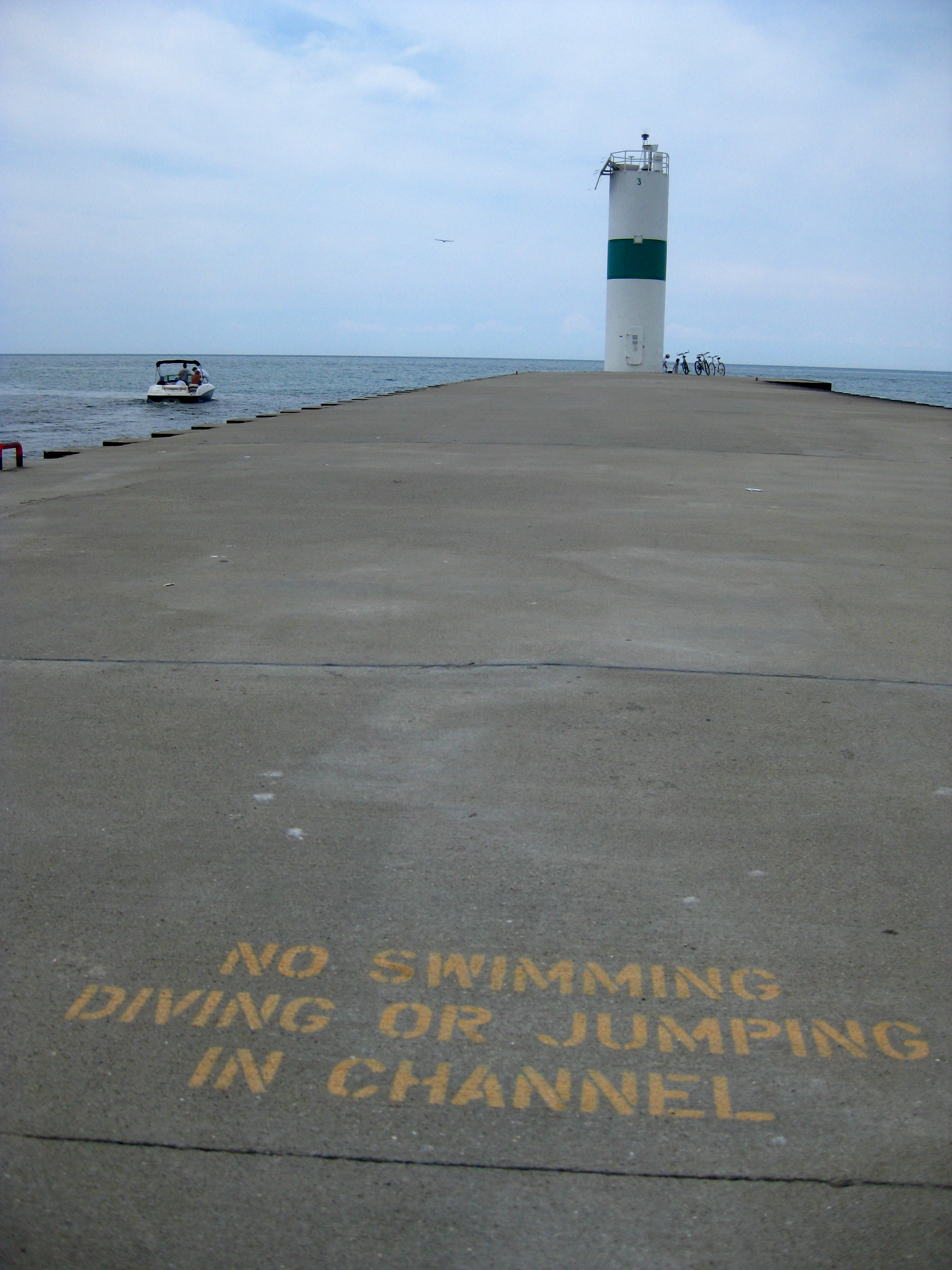
- Constructed: 1997
- Foundation: concrete pier
- Construction: cylindrical "D9-type" tower
- Height: 11 m (36 ft)
- Fog signal: 3sec every 30sec
- Focal height: 43 ft (13 m)
- Lens: 12 inches (300 mm) optic
- Range: 9 nmi (17 km; 10 mi)
- Characteristic: Fl G 2.5s
- Pentwater South Pierhead Light
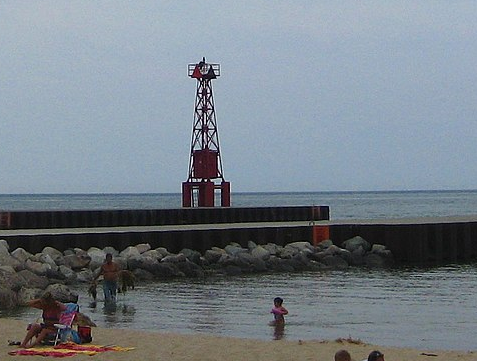
- Constructed: 1937
- Construction: concrete (pier), steel (tower)
- Height: 10 m (33 ft)
- Heritage: National Register of Historic Places contributing property
- Focal height: 48 ft (15 m)
- Lens: 12 inches (300 mm) optic
- Range: 4 nmi (7.4 km; 4.6 mi)
- Characteristic: Fl R 4s
- Navigation Structures at Pentwater Harbor
- U.S. National Register of Historic Places
- Area: less than 1 acre (0.40 ha)
- NRHP reference No.: 00001638
- Added to NRHP: January 11, 2001
- Original light
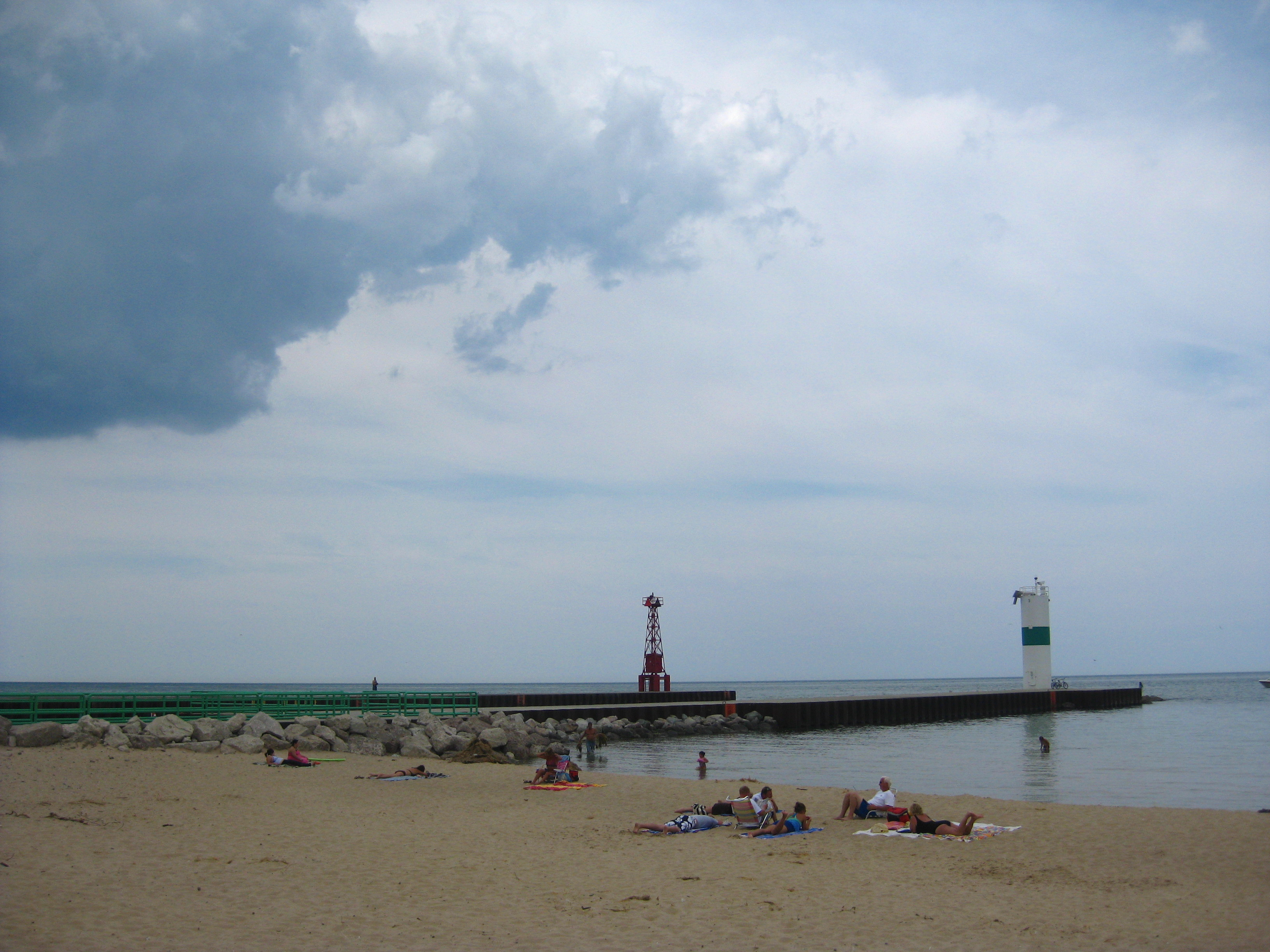
- Constructed: 1873
- Construction: structural wood (artificial physical structure)
- Automated: 1917
- Height: 33 ft (10 m)
- Deactivated: 1937

The Navigation Structures at Pentwater Harbor are navigational structures located at the west end of Lowell Street in Pentwater, Michigan. They were listed on the National Register of Historic Places in 2001.

== History ==
In 1855, Charles Mears constructed a 70-foot-wide (21 m) channel from Pentwater Lake to Lake Michigan, lined with timber cribbing, to accommodate his lumbering interests. In 1858, he built a pier extending over 600 feet (180 m) into Lake Michigan where ships could dock. Additional pier structures were built to line the channel. The first incarnation of the channel was relatively shallow, but Mears continued to improve it, and by 1865 it was deep enough that a lake-going steamer, the Daylite, was able to sail into Pentwater Lake.

In 1868 the US government began widening and improving Mears's channel. The channel was widened to 150 feet (46 m) and dredged to a depth of 16 feet (4.9 m). Two piers were constructed, and in 1873 a timber-framed lighthouse, 33 feet (10 m) high, was built on the south pier. A red 6th-order Fresnel lens was installed. A life-saving station was constructed on the north pier in 1887, and in 1917 the pierhead light was automated.

In 1937, the entire pier structure was replaced by the Army Corps of Engineers with a concrete pier. At the same time, the timber-framed lighthouse was replaced with a steel skeleton structure, and the optic replaced with a 12-inch (300 mm) lens. Most of the life-saving station site, with the exception of the flag tower, was demolished in 1958. A second light was erected on the north pier in 1997.

== Description ==
The Pentwater navigational structures consist of two concrete piers extending into Lake Michigan. At the end of the north pier sits a cylindrical modified "D9-type" tower topped with a 300-millimeter flashing green acrylic optic at a focal plane of 43 feet (13 m). At the end of the south pier sits a steel skeleton tower topped with a 300-millimeter flashing acrylic optic at a focal plane of 48 feet (15 m).
