= Pentwater Lake =

Lake in the state of Michigan, United States

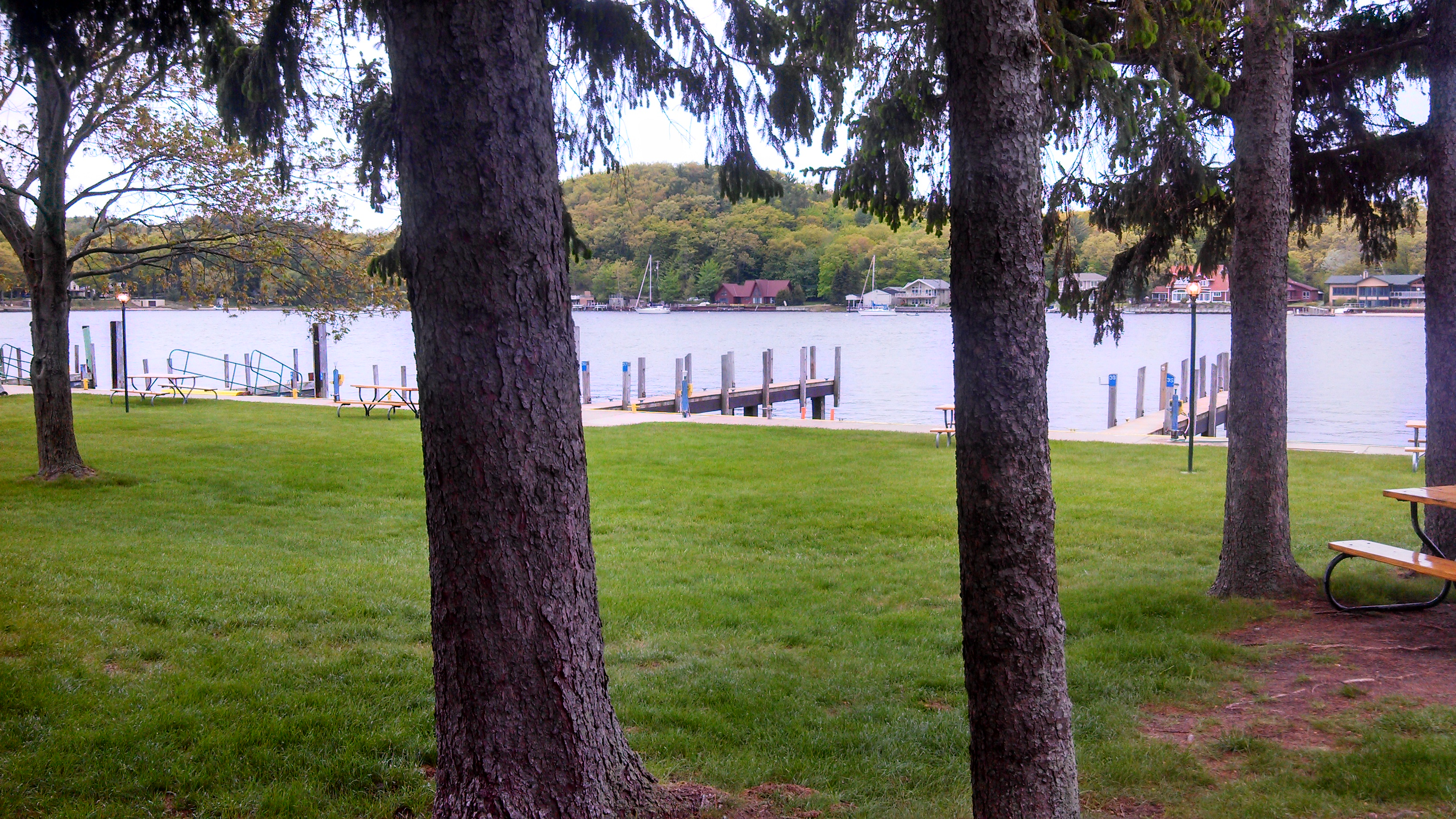
- The western section of the lake

- Location within Michigan Location within the United States
- Location: Oceana County, Michigan
- Coordinates: 43°46′09″N 86°25′17″W
- Primary inflows: Pentwater River
- Primary outflows: Pentwater Lake Channel
- Max. length: 1.8 mi (2.9 km)
- Max. width: 4,756 ft (1.450 km)
- Surface area: 431 acres (174 ha)
- Average depth: 27 ft (8.2 m)
- Max. depth: 50 ft (15 m)
- Water volume: 15,900 acre⋅ft (19,600,000 m^{3})
- Shore length^{1}: 6.2 mi (10.0 km)
- Surface elevation: 581 ft (177 m)
- Settlements: Pentwater
- ^{1} Shore length is not a well-defined measure.

Pentwater Lake is a water body adjacent to the village of Pentwater, Michigan. Its primary inlet is the Pentwater River; its outlet is a man-made channel flowing into Lake Michigan.

Pentwater Lake has a surface area of 431 acres (174 ha), a maximum depth of 50 feet (15 m), and an average depth of 27 feet (8.2 m). The lake contains 11,590 acre-feet (14,300,000 m^{3}), a volume of water that would cover 18 square miles (47 km^{2}) to a depth of 1 foot (0.30 m). Its shoreline is 6.2 miles (10.0 km) long.

== See also ==
- List of lakes in Michigan
