= Pentwater River =

Coordinates: 43°46′53″N 86°26′28″W

Location
- Country: United States

Physical characteristics
- Source
  - location: Michigan

The Pentwater River is a 10.8-mile-long (17.4 km) river in Oceana County, Michigan, in the United States. It rises east of Hart at the inflow of the South Branch Pentwater River and flows northwest to Lake Michigan at the village of Pentwater.

== See also ==
- List of rivers of Michigan
