= Arpin, Wisconsin =

- Village
- Location of Arpin in Wood County, Wisconsin
- Country: United States
- State: Wisconsin
- County: Wood

Area
  - Total: 0.82 sq mi (2.12 km^{2})
  - Land: 0.82 sq mi (2.12 km^{2})
  - Water: 0 sq mi (0.00 km^{2})
- Elevation: 1,142 ft (348 m)

Population (2020)
  - Total: 305
  - Estimate (2023): 296
  - Density: 372.6/sq mi (143.87/km^{2})
- Time zone: UTC-6 (Central (CST))
  - Summer (DST): UTC-5 (CDT)
- Zip code(s): 54410
- Area codes: 715 & 534
- FIPS code: 55-03050
- GNIS feature ID: 1582718
- Website: https://arpinvillagewi.gov/

Arpin is a village in Wood County, Wisconsin, United States. The population was 305 at the 2020 census.

== Geography ==
According to the United States Census Bureau, the village has a total area of 0.82 square miles (2.12 km^{2}), all land.

North Wood County Park is located nearby.

== History ==
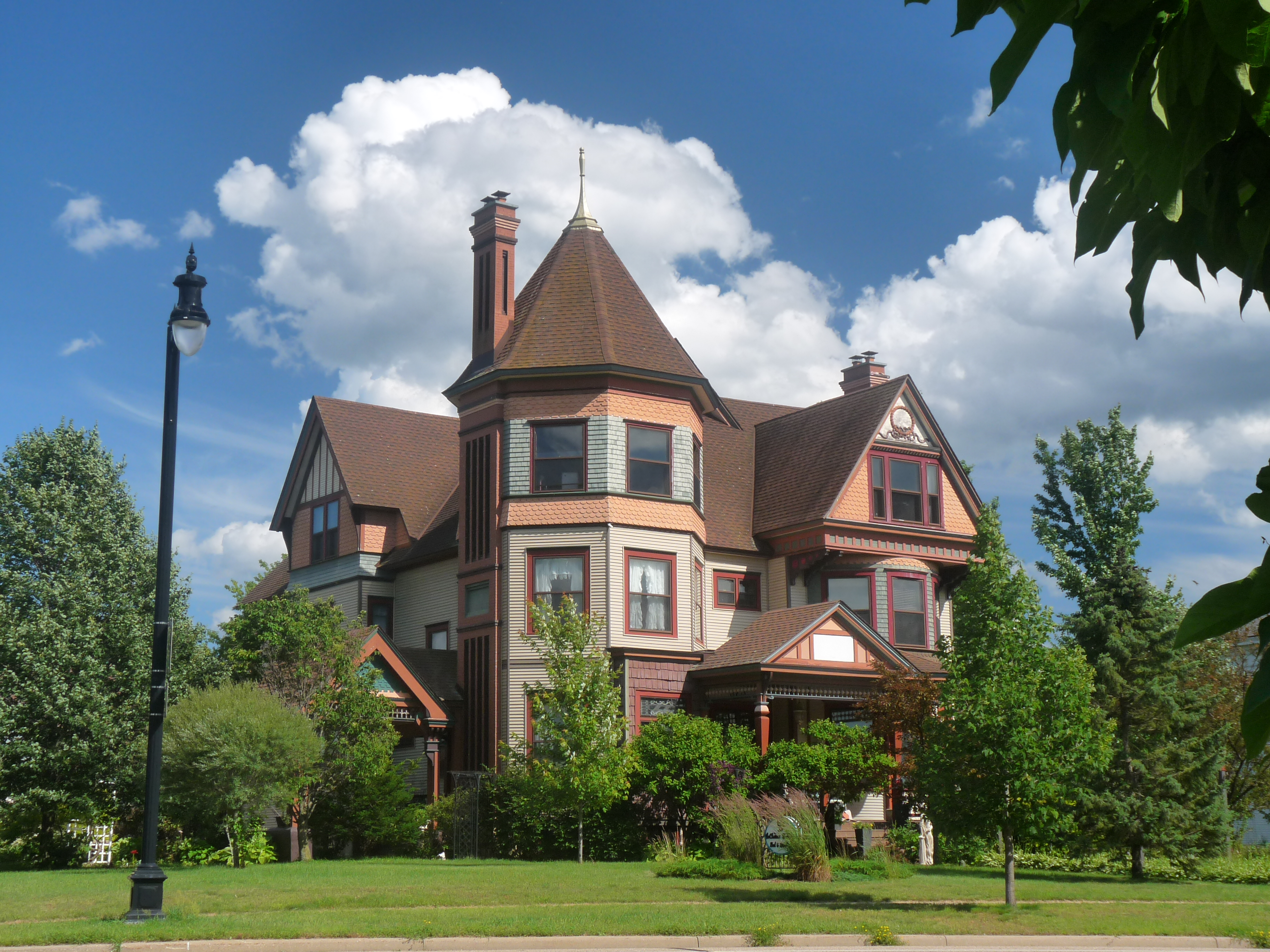
John B. Arpin house, built in 1890 in Rapids

The first village of Arpin was started around 1890 when the John Arpin Lumber Company built a sawmill a mile east of the present village, on Little Hemlock Creek. John Baptiste Arpin and his twin brother Antoine came from Quebec and had been logging in this part of Wisconsin since the 1860s. By 1890 they were working with John's sons. To give an idea of their scale of operations, John Arpin's house built in 1890 still stands in Wisconsin Rapids - the beautiful Queen Anne-styled house on First Street facing the river. Back in that first Arpin, a store, a post office, some homes, a Presbyterian church, and a creamery grew up near the sawmill. The first postmaster was John's son, J. Z.

Also in 1890, the Port Edwards, Centralia & Northern Railway (later acquired by the Wisconsin Central) built its line from Rapids to Marshfield a mile to the west of the first village. Martin Pfyle started another little village a mile south on the rail line. It had a store, a cheese factory, a saloon, and homes. However, the railroad had built its depot where it crossed the road that is now County N - not at the sawmill or the second village - but where the current village is. Near that depot a store started, and a saloon, and a blacksmith's shop. Gradually the businesses and most of the homes shifted from the other two villages to cluster around the depot.

Around 1891 the Wood County Railroad built a spur to the mill from Vesper and in 1892 the John Edwards Manufacturing Company built a logging spur NE out of Arpin, three miles into its timber holdings. The Arpin planing mill burned in 1893 and the sawmill in June 1894, but the Arpins still had lumber to cut, so they rebuilt. In 1902 the Chicago & Northwestern built another rail line alongside the first, also running from Rapids to Marshfield.

In Arpin there is a community of Potawatomi and other Native Americans lived at Skunk Hill, four miles to the southwest.

Arpin was the site of an early twentieth century agricultural settlement of Jewish families from Europe. The German philanthropist Baron Maurice de Hirsch had become concerned about the plight of European Jews who were migrating in increasing numbers to large cities. He established the Industrial Removal Office to settle Jewish families into what were seen as more healthy environments. The Milwaukee branch of the office was the Milwaukee Jewish Industrial Aid Society, headed by Adolph Walter Rich, Milwaukee merchant, manufacturer, and philanthropist. As the trees near Arpin were cut and the sawmill ceased operations, both houses and land were available. The society purchased 720 acres (2.9 km^{2}) of land just north of town, and Rich eventually added additional acres. Each family was to be assigned a 40-acre (160,000 m^{2}) tract with livestock, implements, a suitable dwelling, and funds to cover incidental expenses. A foreman was to be appointed to supervise the settlement.

On December 1, 1901 the first five families arrived. More followed. Many of the new settlers were from Russia. By May 1906 the new settlers had cleared an average of 10 acres (40,000 m^{2}) each and had begun to produce crops of corn and vegetables and to cut cord wood. With the money from these crops the settlers were able to begin payment of interest owed to the society. Rich made frequent trips to Arpin. In 1915 a Jewish house of worship was built. A strong feeling of community developed among the settlers and they got along well with their Christian neighbors. The number of people in the settlement was never large, about seventy or eighty people at most, almost of all of whom were engaged in agriculture. In the 1920s people began to drift away; bitterly cold winters, better paying jobs in nearby cities, and the difficulties of anyone in Wisconsin trying to making a living on small farms were all factors in the slow decline of the colony. In 2008 Wisconsin Public Television produced a program, Chosen Towns, which features interviews with people remembering Arpin and other similar settlements.

By the 1920s dairying had surpassed lumbering. Four cheese factories were operating near the village. The Dairyman's State Bank had started in 1914. The town had also added various churches, a hardware store, a meat market, a boot and shoe store, a lumber yard, a garage, a restaurant, and a hotel and livery and taxicab stable.

== Demographics ==
Historical population
Census	Pop.	Note	%±
1980	361		—
1990	312		−13.6%
2000	337		8.0%
2010	333		−1.2%
2020	305		−8.4%
2023 (est.)	296	▼	−3.0%
U.S. Decennial Census

=== 2010 census ===
As of the census of 2010, there were 333 people, 143 households, and 81 families residing in the village. The population density was 391.8 inhabitants per square mile (151.3/km^{2}). There were 153 housing units at an average density of 180.0 per square mile (69.5/km^{2}). The racial makeup of the village was 96.7% White, 0.3% Native American, 0.3% Asian, 0.3% from other races, and 2.4% from two or more races. Hispanic or Latino of any race were 0.6% of the population.

There were 143 households, of which 26.6% had children under the age of 18 living with them, 44.8% were married couples living together, 5.6% had a female householder with no husband present, 6.3% had a male householder with no wife present, and 43.4% were non-families. 33.6% of all households were made up of individuals, and 15.4% had someone living alone who was 65 years of age or older. The average household size was 2.27 and the average family size was 2.98.

The median age in the village was 38.8 years. 23.7% of residents were under the age of 18; 8.7% were between the ages of 18 and 24; 24.6% were from 25 to 44; 29.7% were from 45 to 64; and 13.2% were 65 years of age or older. The gender makeup of the village was 49.5% male and 50.5% female.

=== 2000 census ===
As of the census of 2000, there were 337 people, 139 households, and 93 families residing in the village. The population density was 397.3 people per square mile (153.1/km^{2}). There were 148 housing units at an average density of 67.2 persons/km^{2} (174.5 persons/sq mi). The racial makeup of the village was 98.81% White, 0.00% African American, 0.89% Native American, 0.00% Asian, 0.00% Pacific Islander, 0.00% from other races, and 0.30% from two or more races. 1.19% of the population were Hispanic or Latino of any race.

There were 139 households, out of which 33.8% had children under the age of 18 living with them, 54.7% were married couples living together, 8.6% have a woman whose husband does not live with her, and 32.4% were non-families. 26.6% of all households were made up of individuals, and 12.9% had someone living alone who was 65 years of age or older. The average household size was 2.42 and the average family size was 2.96.

In the village, the population was spread out, with 26.7% under the age of 18, 5.3% from 18 to 24, 33.5% from 25 to 44, 16.0% from 45 to 64, and 18.4% who were 65 years of age or older. The median age was 37 years. For every 100 females, there were 98.2 males. For every 100 females age 18 and over, there were 93.0 males.

The median income for a household in the village was $31,563, and the median income for a family was $43,125. Males had a median income of $32,019 versus $21,964 for females. The per capita income for the village was $15,812. 4.3% of the population and 2.0% of families were below the poverty line. Out of the total people living in poverty, 2.1% are under the age of 18 and 13.0% are 65 or older.

== Notable people ==
- Adolph Walter Rich, businessman and philanthropist
- Byron Whittingham, Wisconsin State Representative

== See also ==
- List of villages in Wisconsin
