= North Wood County Park =

County park in Wisconsin, United States

Coordinates: 44°30′55″N 90°08′20″W

North Wood County Park is a county park in Wood County, Wisconsin. Entrances to the park are located in Pittsville and Arpin. North Wood County Park was so named for its location relative to nearby South Wood County Park.

The park has an area of 172 acres (0.70 km^{2}). Amenities include campsites, disc golf course, playgrounds, and a hiking trail.
