= South Wood County Park =

County park in the U.S. state of Wisconsin

Coordinates: 44°21′51″N 89°44′26″W

South Wood County Park is a county park in Wood County, Wisconsin. The entrance to the park is in Wisconsin Rapids. South Wood County Park was so named for its location relative to nearby North Wood County Park.

The park has an area of 332 acres (1.34 km^{2}). Amenities include a boat landing, a camping area, and hiking trails.
