= Pentwater Township, Michigan =

- Civil township
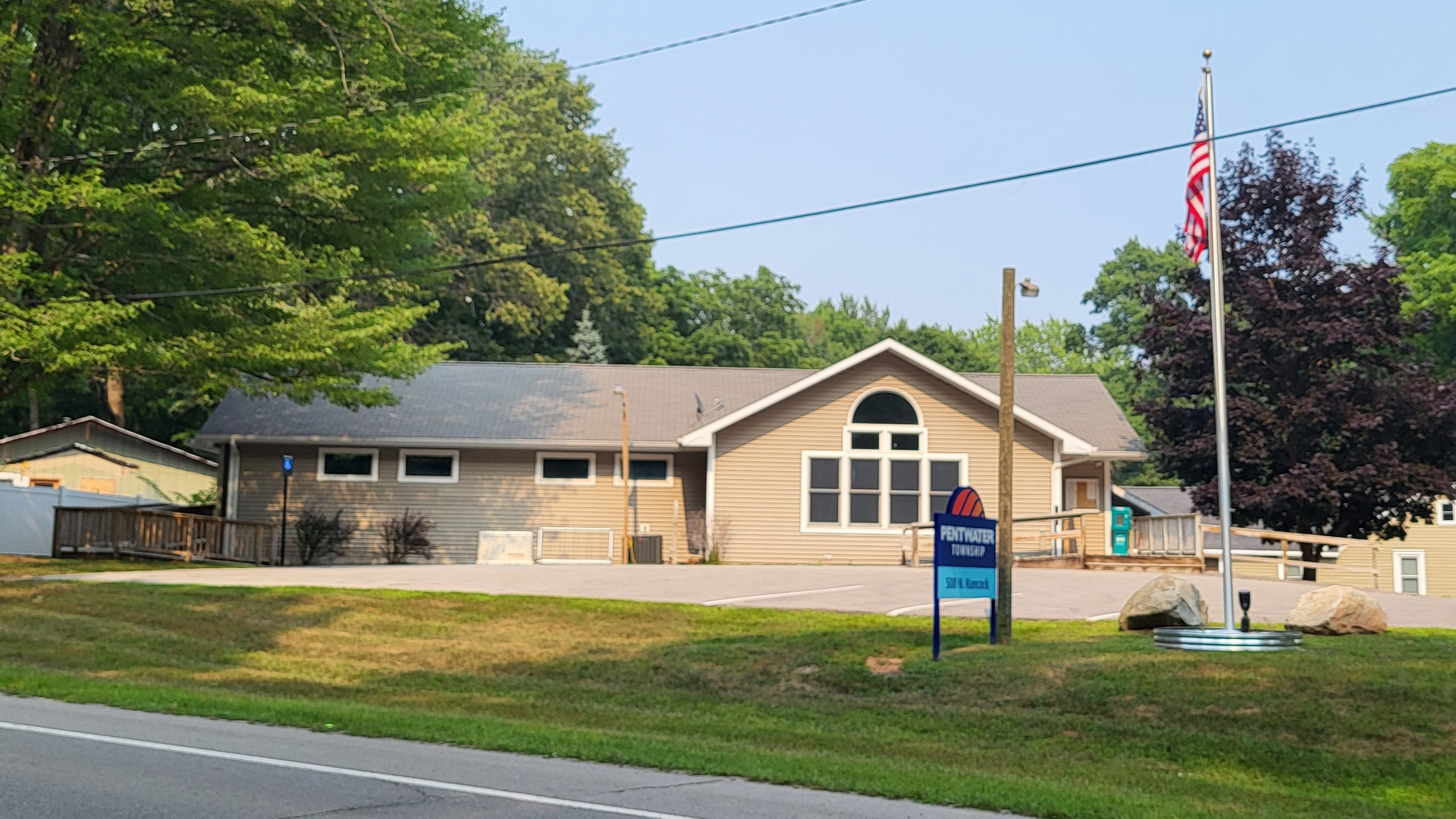
- Pentwater Township Hall

- Location within the state of Michigan Location within the United States
- Coordinates: 43°46′50″N 86°25′32″W
- Country: United States
- State: Michigan
- County: Oceana

Area
  - Total: 14.2 sq mi (36.7 km^{2})
  - Land: 13.4 sq mi (34.8 km^{2})
  - Water: 0.73 sq mi (1.9 km^{2})
- Elevation: 620 ft (189 m)

Population (2020)
  - Total: 1,652
  - Density: 123/sq mi (47.5/km^{2})
- Time zone: UTC-5 (Eastern (EST))
  - Summer (DST): UTC-4 (EDT)
- ZIP code: 49449
- Area code: 231
- FIPS code: 26-63560
- GNIS feature ID: 1626893

Pentwater Township is a civil township of Oceana County in the U.S. state of Michigan. The population was 1,652 at the 2020 census. The Village of Pentwater is located within the township.

== Geography ==
According to the United States Census Bureau, the township has a total area of 14.2 square miles (37 km^{2}), of which, 13.4 square miles (35 km^{2}) of it is land and 0.8 square miles (2.1 km^{2}) of it (5.29%) is water.

== Demographics ==
As of the census of 2000, there were 1,513 people, 712 households, and 481 families residing in the township. The population density was 112.8 inhabitants per square mile (43.6/km^{2}). There were 1,571 housing units at an average density of 117.1 per square mile (45.2/km^{2}). The racial makeup of the township was 96.70% White, 0.20% African American, 0.46% Native American, 0.33% Asian, 0.20% Pacific Islander, 0.59% from other races, and 1.52% from two or more races. Hispanic or Latino of any race were 2.12% of the population.

There were 712 households, out of which 19.0% had children under the age of 18 living with them, 58.4% were married couples living together, 6.7% had a female householder with no husband present, and 32.4% were non-families. 29.4% of all households were made up of individuals, and 14.2% had someone living alone who was 65 years of age or older. The average household size was 2.12 and the average family size was 2.56.

In the township the population was spread out, with 16.6% under the age of 18, 5.3% from 18 to 24, 16.1% from 25 to 44, 34.4% from 45 to 64, and 27.6% who were 65 years of age or older. The median age was 52 years. For every 100 females, there were 92.2 males. For every 100 females age 18 and over, there were 89.5 males.

The median income for a household in the township was $42,574, and the median income for a family was $47,875. Males had a median income of $37,500 versus $26,250 for females. The per capita income for the township was $23,837. About 5.9% of families and 7.4% of the population were below the poverty line, including 11.6% of those under age 18 and 3.7% of those age 65 or over.
