= Jewish Industrial Removal Office =

The Industrial Removal Office (IRO) was an agency assisting European Jewish immigrants to the United States in the early 20th century. It was formed in 1901 by the Jewish Agricultural Society. The Jewish Immigrant Information Bureau was founded in 1907 as an offshoot of the IRO. The IRO also had an uncertain relationship with the Jewish Territorial Organization, led by Israel Zangwill.

== Background ==
Jews in the twentieth century were met with antisemitic attitudes in various places. In Spain and Portugal, they had previously been confronted by the Spanish Inquisition. The Inquisition forced Jews to renounce their faith and convert to Christianity, with the penalty of being exiled if they did not do so. Once Jews converted to Christianity, they were branded New Christians by the Spanish. This served to continuously single out the Jewish even when they attempted to assimilate completely to the society around them. In Romania Jews were faced with similar problems. These struggles caused major migration among Jewish groups.

== Establishment ==
As a consequence of this increase in migration from Jewish groups, immigration records were created, and organizations were formed to facilitate the migration of Jews. A branch of the Jewish Agricultural Society called The Industrial Removal Office (IRO), created and funded by philanthropist Maurice de Hirsch, was created in 1901 in order to help Jewish immigrants to integrate economically, culturally, and permanently into the affairs of American Society in the United States of America.

== Activities ==
Agents from The Industrial Removal Office received applications from Jews and sent them to be reviewed by The New York Bureau, who then responded to The Industrial Removal Office with opportunities that fit their individual clients needs so as to promote a welcoming environment that provided its newcomers a more likely chance at long-term success in their new communities.

== Related groups ==
The Jewish Immigrant Information Bureau (JIIB), which was established in 1907, was the branch of The Industrial Removal Office that met with these Jewish immigrants in Galveston and sent them to their new communities. The Jewish Immigrant Information Bureau also worked with The Jewish Territorial Organization (ITO), which was founded in 1905 and led by Israel Zangwill, in sending pamphlets to Europe to convince Russian Jews to come to the United States through the port of Galveston, furthering the goals of The Industrial Removal Office. These migrants were put in American communities with the intention of setting up larger Jewish communities around them through the eventual immigration of their friends and family.

Israel Zangwill was hesitant at first in working with the Galveston Immigration Plan, which was furthered by The Industrial Removal Office and The Jewish Immigrant Information Bureau, because he did not want to send Jewish immigrants to a place where they could fully assimilate. This was because Israel Zangwill's beliefs were in support of the Zionist movement which advocated for the return of Jewish people to their motherland in Israel. Israel Zangwill wanted a Jewish homeland in Palestine.

== Later history ==
With a financial depression in 1907, The Industrial Removal Office was forced to increase the advertisement of their operations and send its agents further away. However, the offices which were in less populated areas of the United States, or were most affected, like Philadelphia and Boston, had to temporarily close at the end of the depression. Following this, and World War I, The Industrial Removal Office was left with very low funds and consequently a decreased reach prompting it to dissolve in 1922.
