= Jewish Agricultural Society =

Letterhead of a bond issued by the Jewish Agricultural Society

The Jewish Agricultural Society (formerly known as the Jewish Agricultural and Industrial Aid Society) was a subsidiary organization of the Baron de Hirsch Fund, which was first created in 1891 by the wealthy Jewish industrialist and philanthropist Maurice de Hirsch. Hirsch established the fund in order to help resettle Russian Jewry - mainly in Argentina, Canada and the United States - following the events of the pogroms of the early 1880s.

== History ==
The Jewish Agricultural Society was incorporated in the U.S. in 1900, four years after Hirsch's death, with the primary agenda, in the same vein as its parent organization, to help Jewish immigrants purchase, develop and maintain farmland. In addition to identifying and securing properties and issuing mortgage loans, the J.A.S. also provided vocational training and many other resources for new Jewish farmers and their families. Though the early efforts of the Baron de Hirsch Fund focused on establish farming colonies in the U.S., the leadership of the J.A.S., taking note of the unsuccessful nature of this enterprise, over time, decided instead to settle single farming families; with the aim of establishing a class of real farmers.
