= Kalara, Bhopal =

Kalara
- village
- Location within Madhya Pradesh Location within India
- Coordinates: 23.4862978°N 77.3001325°E
- Country: India
- State: Madhya Pradesh
- District: Bhopal
- Tehsil: Berasia
- Elevation: 508 m (1,667 ft)

Population (2011)
  - Total: 2,520
- Time zone: UTC+5:30 (IST)
- ISO 3166 code: MP-IN
- 2011 census code: 482291

Kalara is a village in the Bhopal district of Madhya Pradesh, India. It is located in the Berasia tehsil.

== Demographics ==
According to the 2011 census of India, Kalara has 539 households. The effective literacy rate (i.e. the literacy rate of population excluding children aged 6 and below) is 78.73%.

Demographics (2011 Census)
	Total	Male	Female
Population	2520	1317	1203
Children aged below 6 years	371	195	176
Scheduled caste	503	269	234
Scheduled tribe	36	20	16
Literates	1692	1013	679
Workers (all)	1243	713	530
Main workers (total)	522	383	139
Main workers: Cultivators	164	139	25
Main workers: Agricultural labourers	244	152	92
Main workers: Household industry workers	26	15	11
Main workers: Other	88	77	11
Marginal workers (total)	721	330	391
Marginal workers: Cultivators	66	28	38
Marginal workers: Agricultural labourers	570	258	312
Marginal workers: Household industry workers	49	24	25
Marginal workers: Others	36	20	16
Non-workers	1277	604	673
