= Wellers Bay =

Bay in Ontario, Canada

Coordinates: 44.01°N 77.59°W

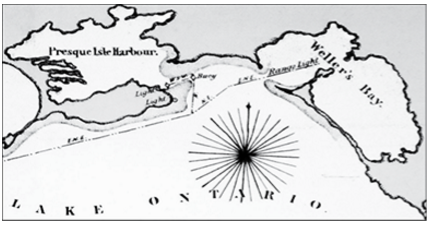
In 1861 government officials considered making the bay a harbour of refuge.

Wellers Bay is a small bay on Lake Ontario, on the west side of Prince Edward County. In 1861 the Government of the Province of Canada considered making it a "harbour of refuge", and installing a lighthouse.

During World War II the beach was part of the Consecon Air Weapons Range and was used as a firing range, for pilot-trainees.

In 1978 the Wellers Bay National Wildlife Area was created. Subsequently, locals used to using the area for fishing, snowmobiling, and other recreational uses started clashing with officials charged with a responsibility to protect wildlife. In the 1990s officials started issuing fines. Municipal politicians tried negotiating a relaxation of the rules, without success. On May 27, 2011, the Canadian Wildlife Service announced the bay's beaches would be off limits.

A key 83 hectares (210 acres) of the 8 kilometres (5.0 mi) bay are set aside as a National Wildlife Area, including Bald Island, Bald Head Island, Fox Island, and the spit that protects the bay, one of the last undeveloped spits on the Great Lakes and an important bird habitat.
