= PS Kalara =

Coordinates: 28.152785°S 153.564035°E

History

Australia
- Name: Kalara
- Owner: Messrs. D. L. Brown and Co.
- Port of registry: (Australia) official number 78167
- Ordered: Messrs. D. L. Brown and Co
- Builder: Messrs. Smith, Forrester, and Co
- Launched: 3 November 1880 Kangaroo Point
- Christened: 3 November 1880 by Mrs D. L. Brown.
- Maiden voyage: 2 April 1880
- Fate: Wrecked 6 November 1886

General characteristics
- Type: Iron paddle steamer
- Tonnage: 166 GRT; 90 NRT
- Length: 130 ft 0 in (39.62 m)
- Beam: 20 ft 0 in (6.10 m)
- Draught: Unloaded 2 ft 9 in (0.84 m) Loaded 5 ft 0 in (1.52 m)
- Depth of hold: 7 ft 0 in (2.13 m)
- Installed power: Twin compound surface-condensing steam engines
- Propulsion: Feathering floats paddle steamer
- Speed: 9 knots (17 km/h; 10 mph)

The Kalara was an iron paddle steamer built in 1881 by Smith, Forrester, and Co., and launched at Kangaroo Point for Messrs. D. L. Brown and Co. It ran regular trips between Brisbane and the Tweed River. On Saturday 6 November 1886 the Kalara whist exiting the tweed river ran over its own anchor and pierced its hull causing it to sink approximately 30 minutes later approximately one mile north-east of Point Danger and from the Tweed River bar in 15 fathoms.

== Ship launch, description and construction ==
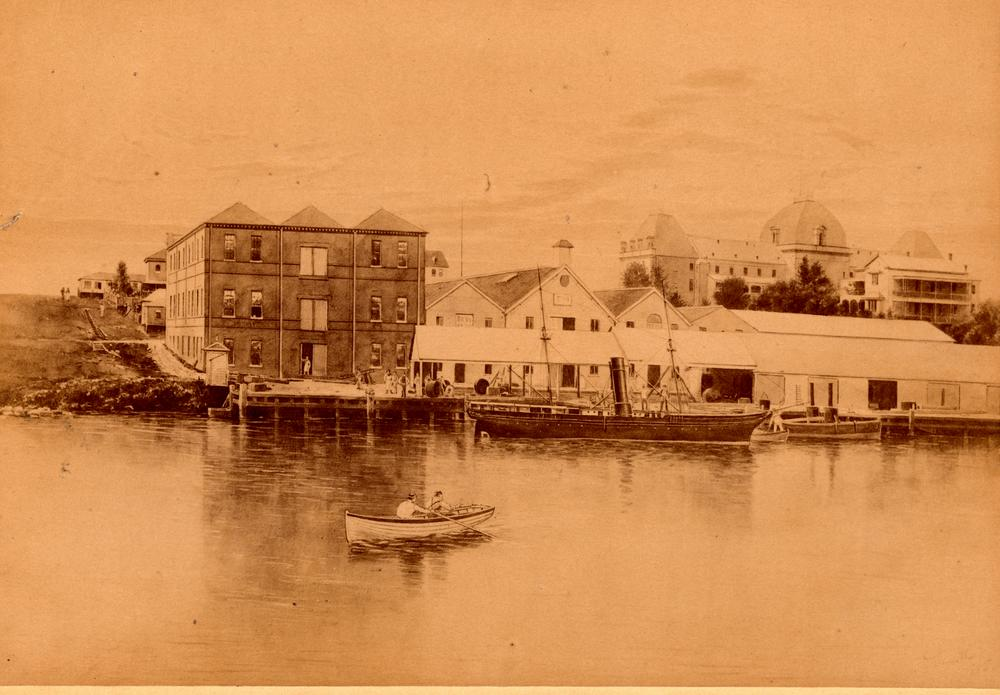
Brisbane River looking towards the wharf and buildings on Short Street, ca. 1889 with the Bulk stores and the tailoring department of D. L. Brown and Company, which fronted onto Short Street

The steamer Kalara was built for Messrs. D. L. Brown and Co. (David Laughland Brown a leading Brisbane merchant) by Smith, Forrester, and Co., was launched at Kangaroo Point very shortly after 10am on 3 November 1880 and christened by Mrs D. L. Brown. It made its maiden test trip down the Brisbane River on Thursday 24 March 1881 to test the engines. It was reported that the vessel steamed out to the quarries and back, and the engines, it was found, worked admirably, and although the machinery was new and considered stiff at first, the vessel attained the speed of nine knots per hour

Shortly later on Saturday 2 April the vessel made its public debut with a trial trip. The over 100 passengers included a number of the employs of the firm of Messrs. D. L, Brown and Co., those who had taken part in the construction of the steamer, and several invited guests. Captain Burna, Government inspecting engineer, and Captain Murray, shipwright surveyor. The steamer had left the wharf of D. L. Brown and Co. at Short street, at twenty minutes past 1, and steamed down the river with the tide, passed the Moreton Bay Pile Light of Francis Channel two hours afterwards. She proceeded some distance out into the Moreton Bay in the direction of Humpybong, turning in the direction of home at about 4 o'clock, and reaching her wharf shortly after 7 p.m.

The Vessel was he Kalara is built from the designs of Mr. Preston, Town Hall Chambers and described as

Length of Keel 130 feet 0 inches (39.62 m)
Beam 20 feet 0 inches (6.10 m)
Depth of Hold 7 feet 0 inches (2.13 m)
Draft when loaded 5 feet 0 inches (1.52 m)
Draft when no load 2 feet 9 inches (0.84 m)

The vessel had a 166.0 gross register tons (GRT) and a 90.0 net register tons (NRT) when first manufactured

The vessel was described in appearance as a trim-looking iron paddle-wheel steamer, built and fitted up in a way that will especially adapt her for the trade between Brisbane and the Tweed and Brunswick rivers. Although not what may be called a large vessel, it was believed at the time to be the biggest steamer having been built in Brisbane.

The vessel was said to have had a very comfortable cabin in the stern, raised above the deck and a poop over this cabin, as well as a roomy bridge amidships, which afforded first rate accommodation for passengers. The cabin had open berths, and is capable of accommodating twenty-five passengers with a small cabin partitioned off for the use of ladies.

=== Propulsion ===
Her engines were by an English firm and shipped to Brisbane by the ships Greta (Arrived 4 December Ship 1190 tons Captain Chellew from Glasgow 27 August) and Perthshire (Arrived 8 November barque, 596 tons, Captain Sember, from Glasgow 23 July). The engines were compound and surface-condensing described as having all the latest improvements being 35 horse power (nominal) and capable of working up to 200-horse power.

The Paddle wheels had a patent feathering floats system as the means of propulsion where by use of levers and linkages connected to a fixed eccentric slightly forward of the main wheel centre coupled to each paddle via a rod and lever designed such that the paddles are kept almost vertical for the short duration that they are in the water.

== Shipwreck event date ==
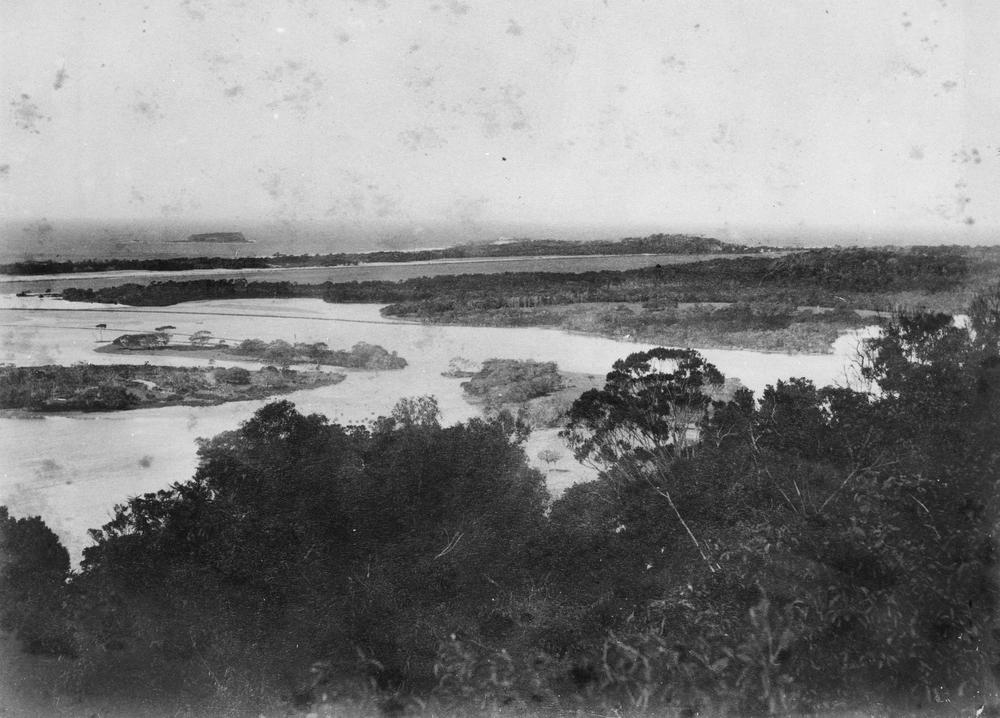
View of the mouth of the Tweed River, ca. 1895

The Kalara, left the Tweed River for Brisbane at half-past 1 o'clock on the Saturday afternoon of 6 November, and was under charge of Tweed River Pilot Captain William McGregor with five passengers and about 20,000 ft of beech, cedar, and pine, valued at from £100 to £150, consigned to the South Brisbane Sawmill Company on board.

When straightening up in rounding the South Spit the vessel got too far on the lee bank. The anchor was accordingly let go by the orders of the pilot, and the Kalara straightened up to the tide. The anchor was then hove up, and the steamer proceeded out across the bar as usual, nothing apparently being wrong. The pilot left the steamer just inside the break, and she crossed the bar about 2 p.m.

Statements differ as to whether she touched the bar in crossing, several of the crew stating that she did not, or that if she did the contact must have been so slight that they did not perceive it while others say she touched very slightly, but not by any means with such force as she had done frequently on previous occasions. However, ten minutes had scarcely elapsed from the time the pilot left her until the mate reported that the vessel was filling. Captain R. D. Henry instantly gave orders to ascertain whether the sluice valves were closed, and to get the force pumps into work. The mate however, anticipated the order, and making a hasty examination found the sluice valves closed. The force pump was quickly got into action, and the vessel headed for the sandy beach.

By this time the fore compartment, in which most of the heavy timber was stowed, was nearly fall of water and filling rapidly. It was at once seen that the pump could not lessen the rapid in pour of water, and the Kalara being down by the head was quite unmanageable. In the short space of five or seven minutes from the time the mate made his first report, the fore compartment was fall of water, and the vessel via visibly settling down by the head. Captain Henry, who had hoisted signals of distress the moment he realised the dangerous position of his vessel, in the hope that they would be seen and responded to from the Pilot Station, when he saw his ship must inevitably founder, ordered the lifeboat to be lowered.

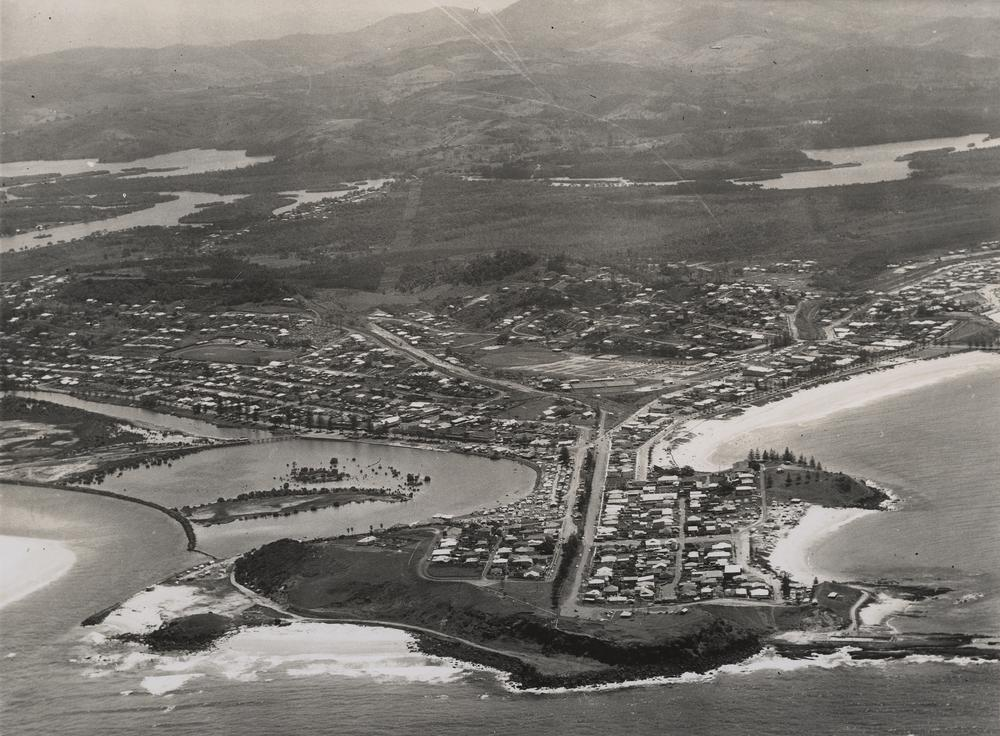
1952 Aerial view looking towards Point Danger

The order was promptly obeyed, and the passengers, who had to leave all their belongings behind them, were soon safe on board of her. All this time the steamer was sinking lower and lower, and there was now not a moment to be lost The dingy was lowered with all possible haste, and the crew, numbering seven, all told, including the captain and mate, got into it, with just the garments they stood up in, and shoved off. The captain and two seamen then got into the lifeboat, leaving the dingy in charge of the mate. - It was now between twenty minutes and half-past 2 o'clock. The boats got clear of the Kalara not a moment too soon, for only a short distance separated them when her head went under, her stern rose almost perpendicularly, and the Kalara disappeared beneath the waves in fifteen fathoms of water at a spot as near as possible one mile north-east of Point Danger and from the Tweed River bar

The mate steered the dingy in for the beach, effected a landing, and reported the matter at the Pilot Station. Meanwhile, Captain Henry laid off in the lifeboat, not deeming it prudent to land as there was a nasty sea on, and one of his passengers was ill, while another was lame. Half-an-hour later the tug Tweed came out and all were safely got aboard of her. The tug then cruised over the scene of the wreck, and some of the passengers' luggage which floated was recovered.

Two theories are advanced as to the cause of this mysterious loss. One is that as the water is shallow at the South Spit where the anchor was let go the vessel, in passing over the anchor, may have sustained an injury to her bottom, which being possibly increased by touching on the bar, would have been sufficiently serious to cause the foundering. The other is that at the particular spot where, she touched the bar—assuming, of course, that she did touch—there may have been a rock which would no doubt have inflicted serious injury

The Kalara had been commanded by Captain A, H. Gruer until two months prior, when he resigned, and Captain Henry received the appointment of the vessel.

=== Marine Board of Queensland inquiry ===
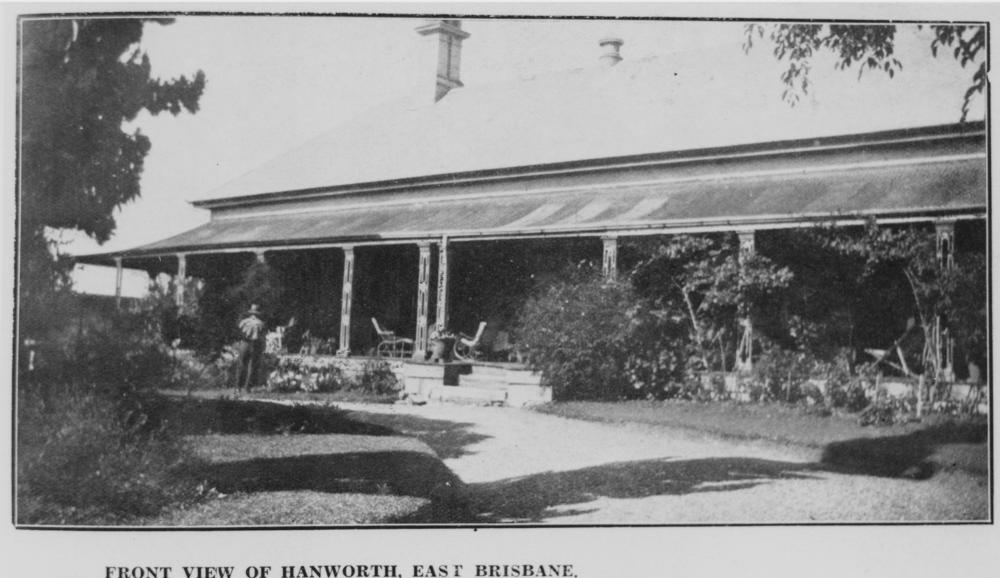
Hanworth, a substantial, brick, single-storeyed residence near Norman Creek at East Brisbane, was erected in 1864-65 for Lieutenant George Poynter Heath, RN, Portmaster of Queensland and member of the Marine Board, and his family. It was designed by early Brisbane architect James Cowlishaw

Commander George Poynter Heath, R.N., the Chairman of the Marine Board in Brisbane lead the hearing into the fate of the Kalara on 16 November 1886

It was found that the pilot was in charge of the vessel when exiting the bar and that the tide was in first quarter flood. The speed of the vessel did not exceed four knots, and the vessel was about half-loaded with cedar and hardwood log timber. On getting to the elbow of the channel at the mouth of the Tweed, the tide caught her on the starboard bow and threw her off to port. To avoid being thrown up on the west bank of the channel, the port anchor was let go to bring her head to the tide, and the engines were stopped and reversed. The vessel, however, bad so much way on her when the anchor was let go in shoal water that she passed over her anchor, the cable streaming on the starboard beam. The anchor was again weighed, and tho pilot having left, the vessel went out over the bar; the mate felt her touch slightly forward in crossing, but it was not noticed by the master or the engineer.

The board were of opinion that the leak, though not suspected at the time, was caused by the vessel passing over the peak of her anchor when going out to the bar of the Tweed, and that, under the circumstances, the star hoard anchor should have been let go, and not the port anchor.' The vessel at the time being in charge of the pilot (who is not within the jurisdiction of the Queensland Government), the board were unwilling to attach any positive blame to Mr. R. Henry, the master.
