= Charles Mears =

American politician

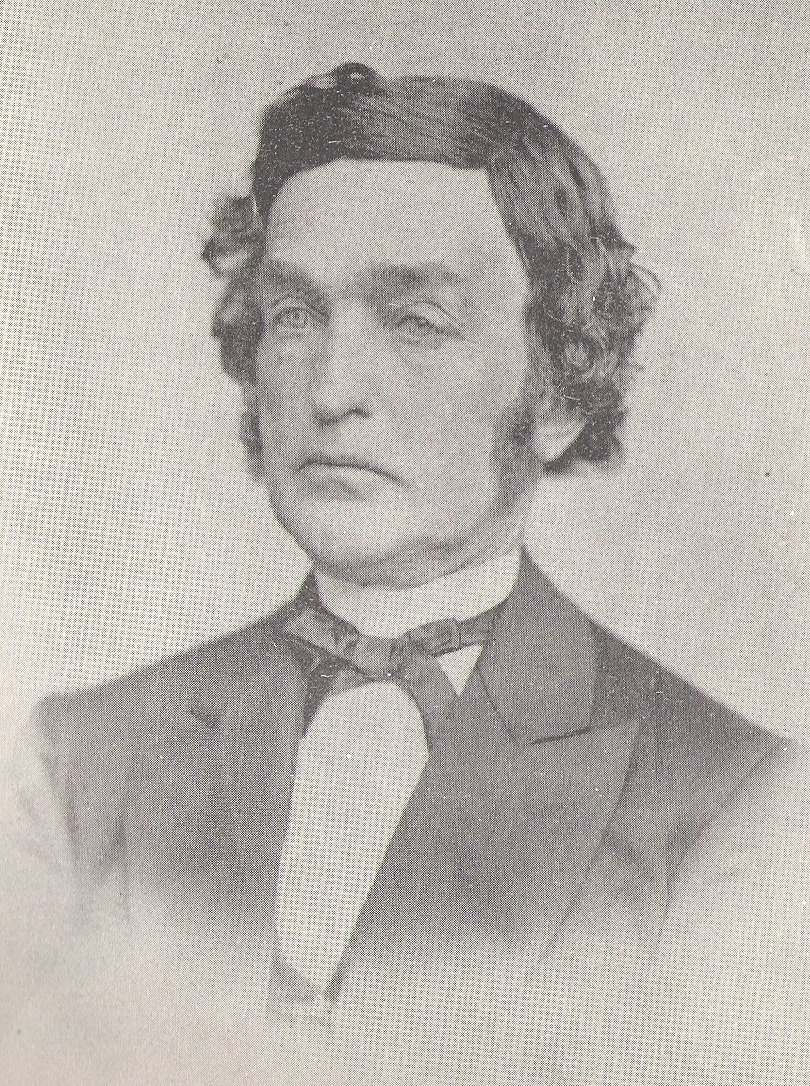
- Mears in 1856

Member of the Michigan Senate
- In office 1863

Personal details
- Born: March 16, 1814 North Billerica, Territory of Massachusetts, U.S.
- Died: May 23, 1895 (aged 81) Chicago, Illinois, U.S.
- Resting place: Rosehill Cemetery
- Party: Republican
- Relatives: Thomas Mears (grandfather)

Charles Mears (March 16, 1814 – May 23, 1895) was an American politician. A member of the Republican Party, he served in the Michigan Senate in 1863.

== Life and career ==
Mears was born in North Billerica, Territory of Massachusetts, the son of Nathan, a selectman, and Lucy Mears. He was the grandson of Thomas Mears, a minuteman in the American Revolutionary War. He attended Hopkinton Academy and Westford Academy. After completing his education, he worked as a lumberman in West Michigan, and was an industrialist in Chicago, Illinois.

Mears served in the Michigan Senate in 1863.

== Death ==
Mears's grave (front row, fourth from left) at Rosehill Cemetery

Mears died on May 23, 1895, at his home in Chicago, at the age of 81, and was buried at Rosehill Cemetery.
