= Pentwater, Michigan =

- Village
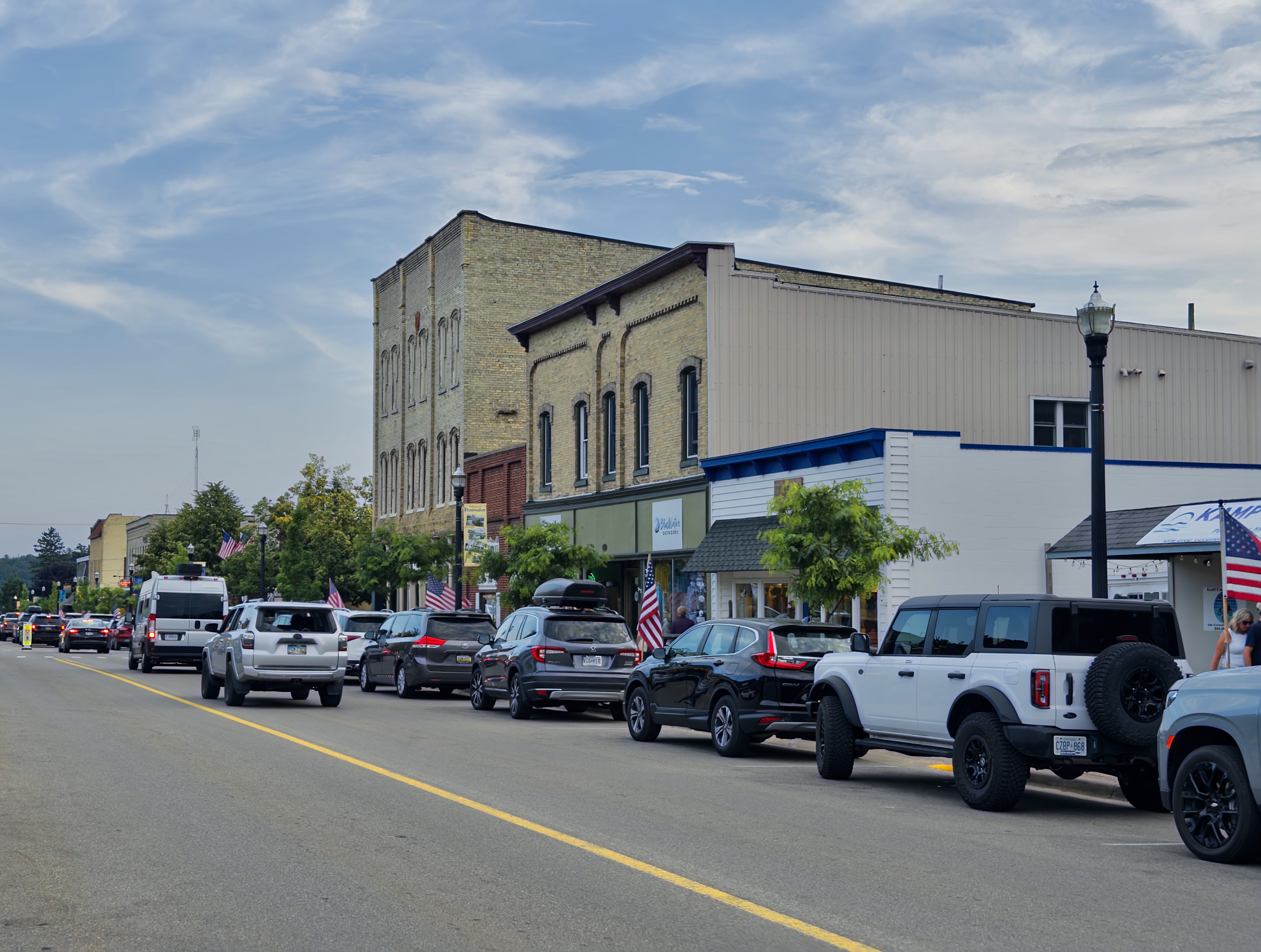
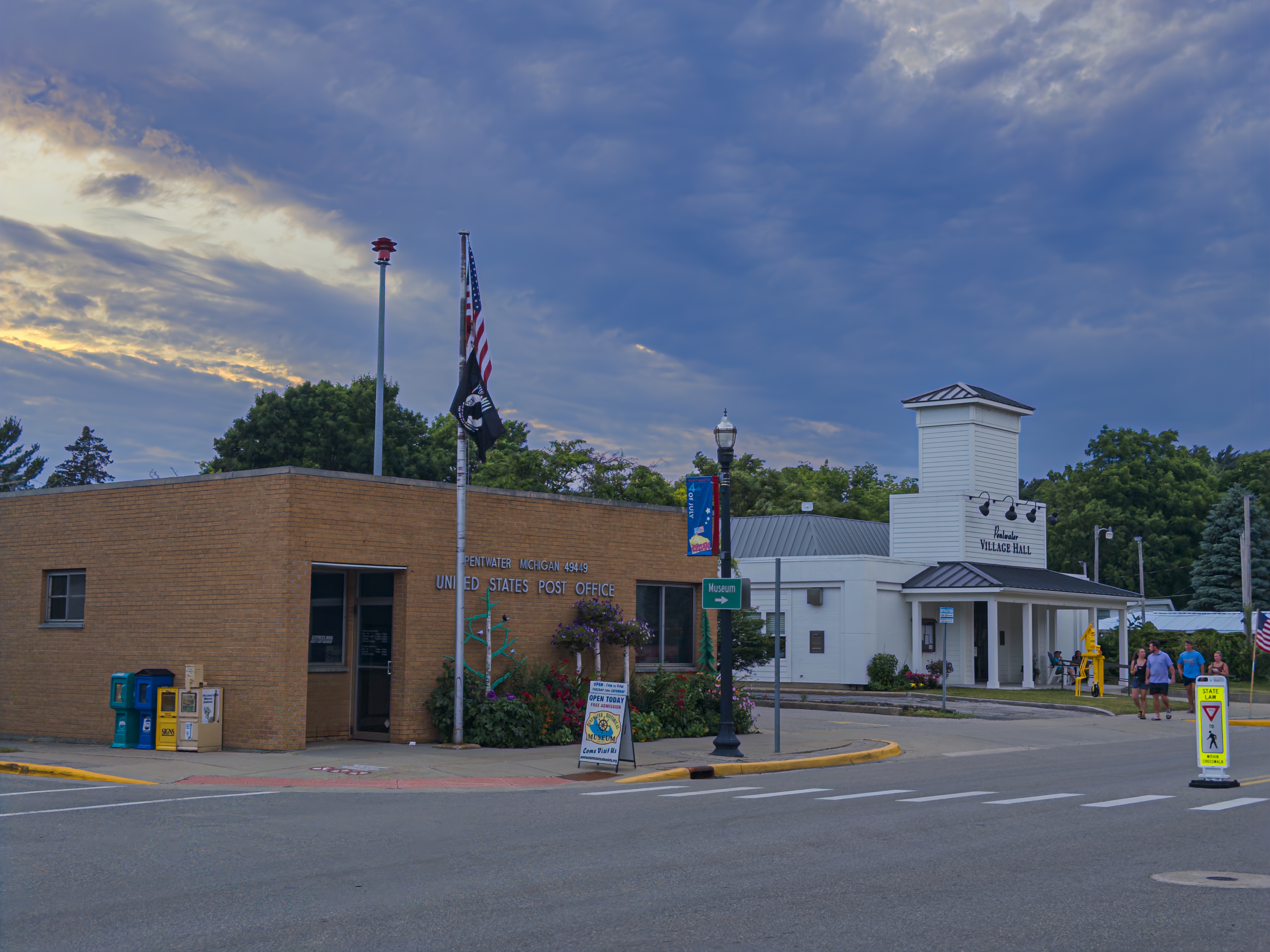
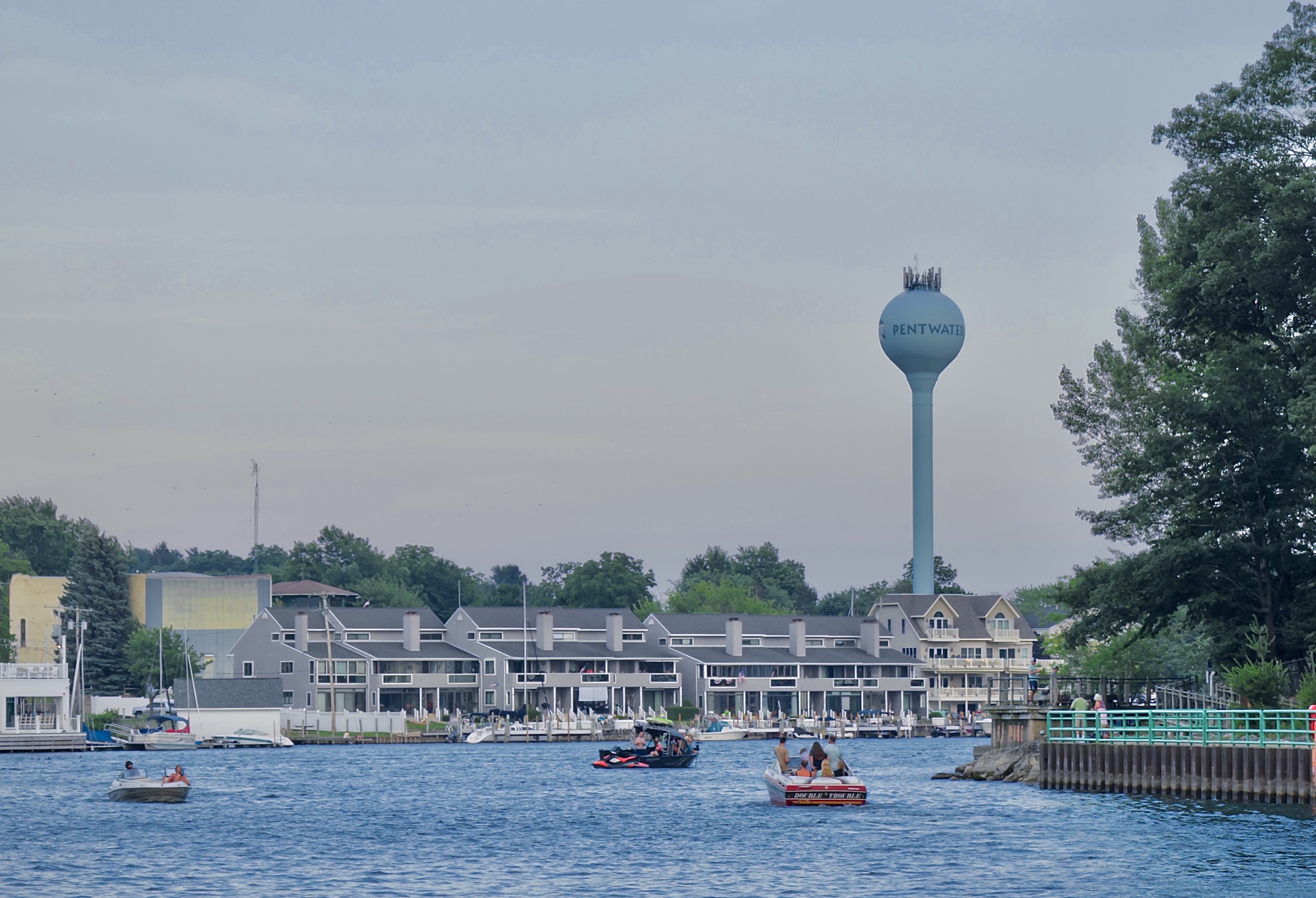
- Downtown Pentwater Post office and village hall Pentwater Lake and canal

- Location of Pentwater, Michigan
- Coordinates: 43°46′49″N 86°25′48″W
- Country: United States
- State: Michigan
- County: Oceana
- Township: Pentwater

Area
  - Total: 1.72 sq mi (4.46 km^{2})
  - Land: 1.34 sq mi (3.46 km^{2})
  - Water: 0.38 sq mi (0.99 km^{2})
- Elevation: 610 ft (186 m)

Population (2020)
  - Total: 890
  - Density: 665.4/sq mi (256.92/km^{2})
- Time zone: UTC-5 (Eastern (EST))
  - Summer (DST): UTC-4 (EDT)
- ZIP code: 49449
- Area code: 231
- FIPS code: 26-63540
- GNIS feature ID: 1621203

Pentwater is a village in Oceana County in the U.S. state of Michigan. The population was 890 at the 2020 census. The village is located within Pentwater Township. Pentwater is home to Mears State Park. The name Pentwater comes from Pent or Penned up waters. The entrance to the channel is notoriously shallow and for many years dictated the size of vessels that the village was able to accommodate.

== Geography ==
According to the United States Census Bureau, the hamlet has a total area of 1.62 square miles (4.20 km^{2}), of which 1.28 square miles (3.32 km^{2}) is land and 0.34 square miles (0.88 km^{2}) is water. Pentwater is the biggest community in Oceana County due to the community's area.

== Transportation ==
- US 31 passes east of the village and runs south toward Muskegon and north toward Ludington.
- Bus. US 31 is a former business loop that ran through downtown Pentwater until May 4, 2023.
- B-15 is a county-designated highway running southerly from Pentwater, closer to (but generally not within sight of) Lake Michigan.

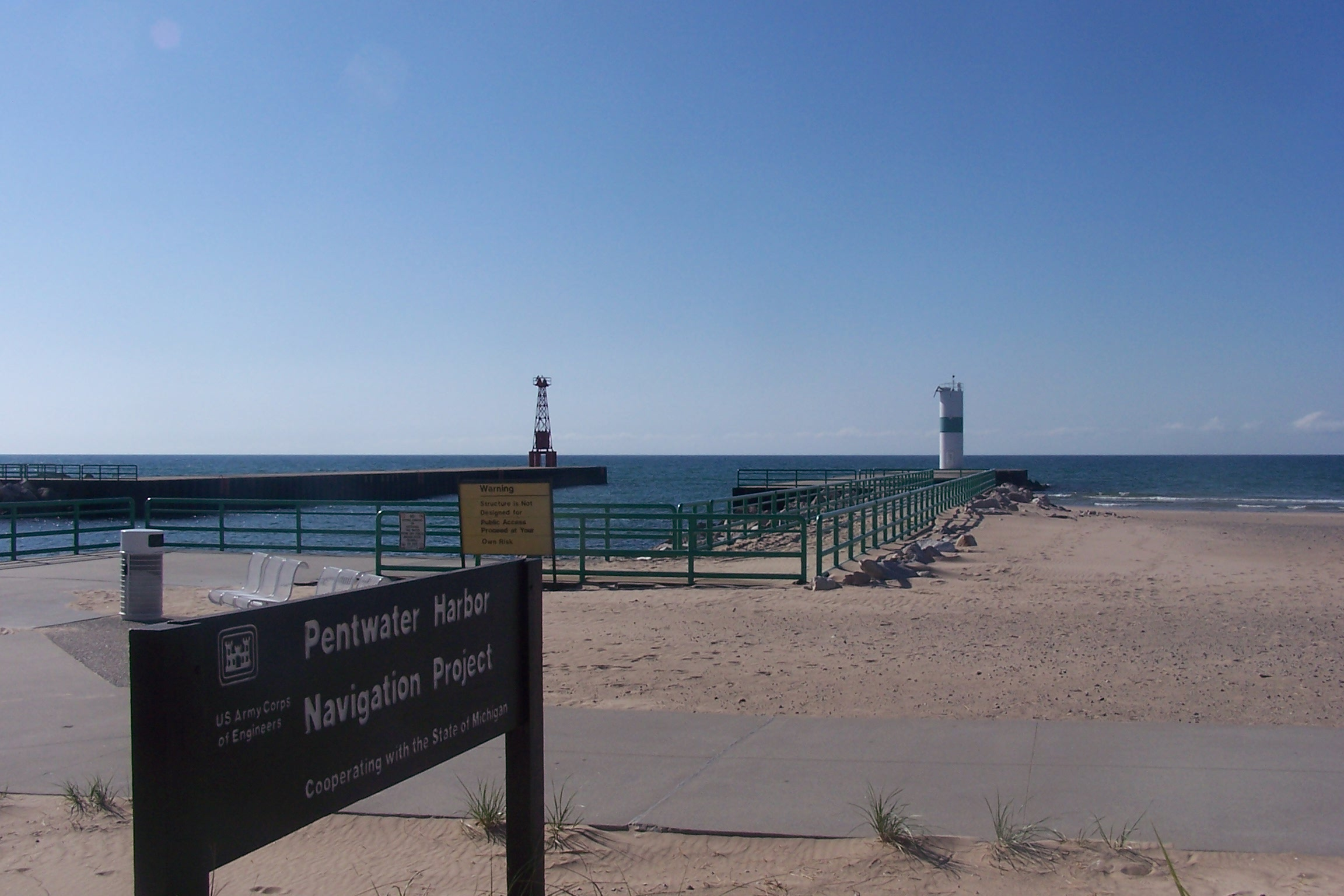
Pentwater harbor and beach

Eight streets within the village: Hancock, Carroll, Wythe, Rutledge, Rush, Ellery, Morris, and Clymer, are named after signers of the Declaration of Independence.

== Demographics ==
Historical population
Census	Pop.	Note	%±
1870	1,294		—
1890	1,510		—
1900	1,061		−29.7%
1910	1,129		6.4%
1920	956		−15.3%
1930	772		−19.2%
1940	820		6.2%
1950	1,097		33.8%
1960	1,030		−6.1%
1970	993		−3.6%
1980	1,165		17.3%
1990	1,050		−9.9%
2000	958		−8.8%
2010	857		−10.5%
2020	890		3.9%
U.S. Decennial Census

=== 2010 census ===
As of the census of 2010, there were 857 people, 450 households, and 269 families residing in the village. The population density was 669.5 inhabitants per square mile (258.5/km^{2}). There were 997 housing units at an average density of 778.9 per square mile (300.7/km^{2}). The racial makeup of the village was 97.3% White, 0.1% African American, 0.2% Native American, 0.9% from other races, and 1.4% from two or more races. Hispanic or Latino of any race were 2.5% of the population.

There were 450 households, of which 13.1% had children under the age of 18 living with them, 50.0% were married couples living together, 7.8% had a female householder with no husband present, 2.0% had a male householder with no wife present, and 40.2% were non-families. 36.0% of all households were made up of individuals, and 19.7% had someone living alone who was 65 years of age or older. The average household size was 1.89 and the average family size was 2.38.

The median age in the village was 60.3 years. 11.2% of residents were under the age of 18; 4.3% were between the ages of 18 and 24; 10.1% were from 25 to 44; 36.2% were from 45 to 64; and 38.3% were 65 years of age or older. The gender makeup of the village was 45.5% male and 54.5% female.

=== 2000 census ===
As of the census of 2000, there were 958 people, 463 households, and 301 families residing in the village. The population density was 733.8 inhabitants per square mile (283.3/km^{2}). There were 904 housing units at an average density of 692.5 per square mile (267.4/km^{2}). The racial makeup of the village was 97.60% White, 0.21% African American, 0.31% Native American, 0.42% Asian, 0.10% Pacific Islander, 0.63% from other races, and 0.73% from two or more races. Hispanic or Latino of any race were 1.15% of the population.

There were 463 households, out of which 17.7% had children under the age of 18 living with them, 54.4% were married couples living together, 8.0% had a female householder with no husband present, and 34.8% were non-families. 31.3% of all households were made up of individuals, and 14.9% had someone living alone who was 65 years of age or older. The average household size was 2.06 and the average family size was 2.51.

In the village, the population was spread out, with 15.8% under the age of 18, 5.4% from 18 to 24, 15.1% from 25 to 44, 33.6% from 45 to 64, and 30.1% who were 65 years of age or older. The median age was 53 years. For every 100 females, there were 89.0 males. For every 100 females age 18 and over, there were 86.4 males.

The median income for a household in the village was $38,542, and the median income for a family was $45,909. Males had a median income of $40,750 versus $25,833 for females. The per capita income for the village was $22,783. About 6.6% of families and 8.4% of the population were below the poverty line, including 17.1% of those under age 18 and 2.7% of those age 65 or over.

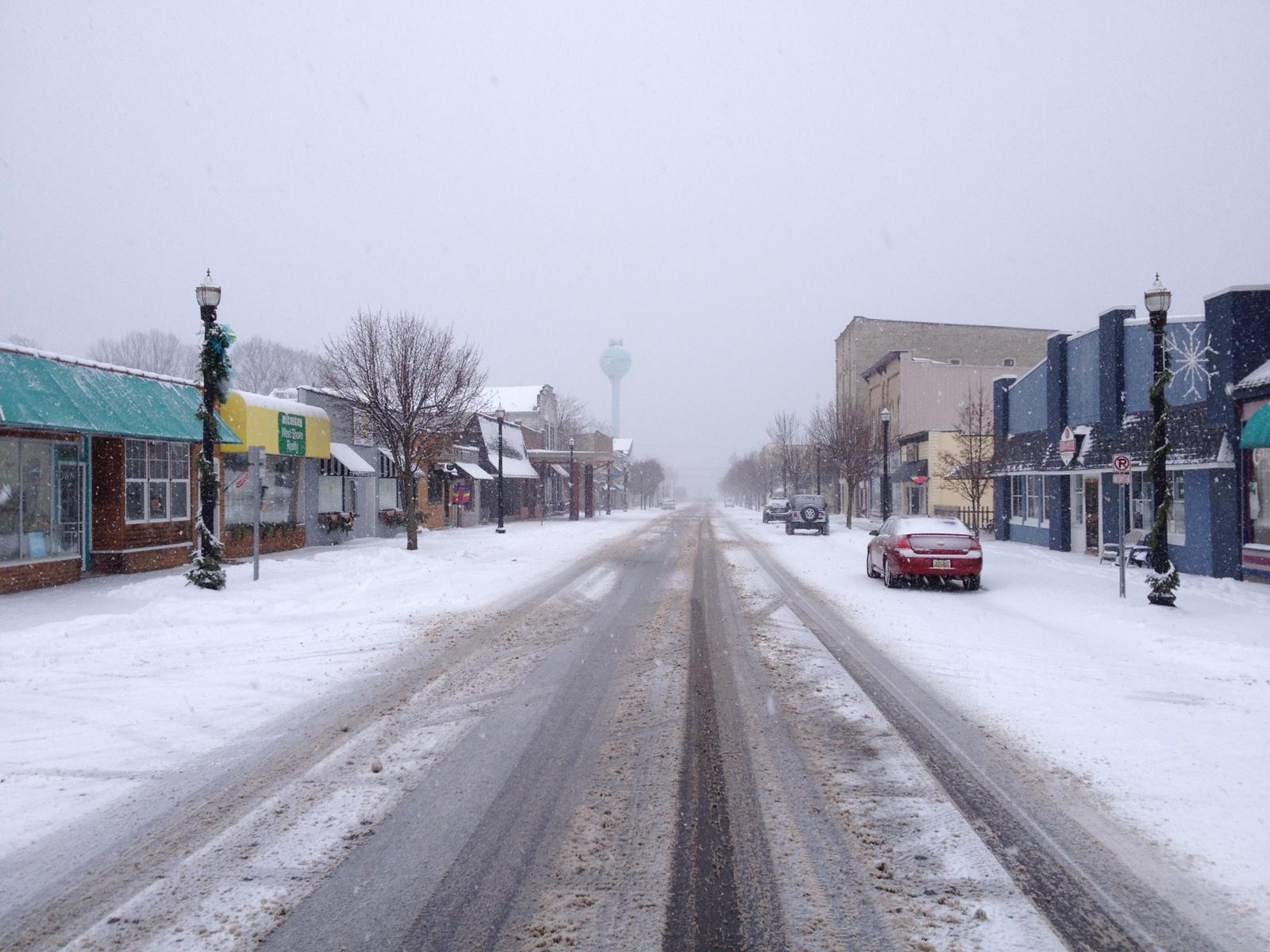
Main street in Pentwater in the fall of 2018

== Local events ==
Pentwater's specialty is its location to Lake Michigan. The area is a tourist mecca in the summer, frequently visited by Chicagoans looking to get away. The Pentwater area has a number of bed and breakfasts, in addition to the more traditional motels. Sportfishing, including Lake Michigan salmon, is popular in the area, as is shopping. The village has a number of art galleries. Adjacent Charles Mears State Park is a popular location during the summer months as well. The village hosts a juried art fair mid-July. Memorial Day in Pentwater is considered the beginning of the summer season, and there is a popular annual fishing contest.

Pentwater is home to several bands, which play concerts Thursday nights during the summer, beginning in late June, in the outdoor bandshell at the village green, a park and natural amphitheater located downtown on the shore of Pentwater Lake.

Pentwater holds an annual Homecoming, which is usually the week of second Thursday of August. Homecoming festivities include a parade, fireworks, and sandcastle-building contest.

== Notable people ==
- Adolph Walter Rich, founder of the Jewish agricultural colony at Arpin, Wisconsin
