= West Michigan Pike Pure Michigan Byway =

The West Michigan Pike Pure Michigan Byway is a Pure Michigan Byway on the Lower Peninsula of the US state of Michigan that follows several different highways, most notably Interstate 94 (I-94), I-196 and US Highway 31 (US 31) and various business routes from the Indiana state line near New Buffalo to the Ludington area. The routing is also mostly part of the Lake Michigan Circle Tour, although it deviates from that tourist route in a few locations in Berrien County. From south to north, the byway specifically follows:

- I-94 from the Indiana state line at New Buffalo Township to M-63 in St. Joseph Township;
- M-63 from I-94 in St. Joseph Township through Benton Harbor to I-196/US 31 in Lake Michigan Beach, including a segment that runs concurrently with Business Loop I-94 (BL I-94) in St. Joseph;
- I-196/US 31 from M-63 in Lake Michigan Beach to BL I-196 in South Haven Township;
- BL I-196 from I-196/US 31 in South Haven Township to I-196/US 31 in South Haven;
- I-196/US 31 from BL I-196 in South Haven to BL I-196/US 31 in Laketown Township;
- BL I-196/US 31 from I-196/US 31 in Laketown Township through Holland to US 31 in Holland Township;
- US 31 from BL I-196/US 31 in Holland Township to Bus. US 31 in Norton Shores;
- Business US 31 (Bus. US 31) from US 31 in Norton Shores through Muskegon to US 31 in Muskegon Township;
- US 31 from Bus. US 31 in Muskegon Township to Bus. US 31 in Whitehall Township;
- Bus. US 31 from US 31 in Whitehall Township through Whitehall and Montague to US 31 in Montague Township;
- US 31 from Montague Township to Bus. US 31 in Pere Marquette Township;
- Bus. US 31 from US 31 to US 10 in Pere Marquette Township near Ludington; and
- US 10 from Bus. US 31 in Pere Marquette Township to US 31 in Amber Township.
