= Business routes of U.S. Route 31 in Michigan =

Routes of a highway in Michigan

Business US Highway 31
- Business routes of US 31 highlighted

Location
- Country: United States
- State: Michigan

Highway system
- United States Numbered Highway System; List; Special; Divided; Michigan State Trunkline Highway System; Interstate; US; State; Byways
← US 31	→ M-31

There have been seven business routes of US Highway 31 in the state of Michigan, of which three of those routes still exist. All seven of the business routes are former sections of US Highway 31 (US 31). They connect the freeway mainline of US 31 to the various downtowns of cities bypassed by US 31. One of the current business routes, for Ludington, are business spur, connecting to US 31 on only one end, while the remaining two for Muskegon and Whitehall–Montague are business loops. The four former routes, for Niles, Holland, Hart and Pentwater, were 2 business spurs and 2 loops, respectively.

== Niles ==
Business US Highway 31
- Location: Niles
- Length: 3.587 mi (5.773 km)
- Existed: 1987–2010

Business US Highway 31 (Bus. US 31) was a business spur running to the Niles downtown area along a former routing of US 31 from US 31 exit 7 (Walton Road) northeasterly then southeasterly into downtown, ending at Bus. US 12 at the corner of Front and Main streets. At the time it was decommissioned, Bus. US 31 was only designated along the north–south segment between Walton Road and Main Street.

It was commissioned in 1987 as a loop connecting to US 31 on both ends, running along US 12 to US 33 (11th Street) north into downtown and along Bus. US 12. Bus. US 31 followed Front Street northward back to the mainline US 31 at Walton Road northwest of downtown. The business loop was extended along Walton Road in 1992 when the next segment of the US 31 freeway opened in Berrien County. The highway was truncated to a spur route in 1998 when M-51 was extended southward. The northernmost remaining portion along Walton Road was turned over to the Berrien County Road Commission on October 23, 2007, and the remaining portion was replaced by an extended M-139 in April 2010.

Major intersections
The entire highway was in Berrien County.

Location	mi	km	Destinations	Notes
Niles	0.000	0.000	Bus. US 12	
Niles Township	1.862	2.997	M-140 north – Watervliet	Southern terminus of M-140
Niles Township	3.587	5.773	Walton Road; Old US 31	Roadway continued as Old US 31
1.000 mi = 1.609 km; 1.000 km = 0.621 mi

== South Haven ==
Business US Highway 31
- Location: South Haven
- Length: 3.992 mi (6.425 km)
- Existed: c. 1942–1963

Business US Highway 31 (Bus. US 31) was a business loop running through downtown South Haven along a former routing of US 31. The loop started at an intersection with US 31 in South Haven Township south of town and ran along LaGrange Road, Phillips Street and Broadway Street into downtown. On the north side, Bus. US 31 crossed the Black River and then followed North Shore Drive back to US 31.

The business loop was created during World War II when the state moved US 31 to bypass downtown South Haven; the former routing was designated as the business loop. In 1963, South Haven was bypassed again by I-196/US 31, and the former bypass of downtown became BL I-196.

Major intersections

County	Location	mi	km	Destinations	Notes
Van Buren	South Haven Township	0.000	0.000	US 31 (Blue Star Highway) – Benton Harbor, Holland M-140 south	Roadway continues southward as M-140
Van Buren	South Haven	0.936	1.506	M-43 east – Kalamazoo	Western terminus of M-43
Allegan	Casco Township	3.992	6.425	US 31 (Blue Star Highway) – South Haven, Holland	
1.000 mi = 1.609 km; 1.000 km = 0.621 mi

== Holland ==
Business US Highway 31
- Location: Holland
- Length: 4.120 mi (6.630 km)
- Existed: 1954–2004
- Tourist routes: Lake Michigan Circle Tour

Business US Highway 31 (Bus. US 31) was a 4.1-mile-long (6.6 km) business loop running through Holland. It started at an interchange on the southern edge of the city where Business Loop Interstate 196 (BL I-196), US 31 and A-2 all converged near West Michigan Regional Airport. BL I-196 turned northward off the US 31 freeway and ran concurrently with Bus. US 31 along Washington Avenue through a residential area on the southern side of Holland in Allegan County. At the intersection with 32nd Street, BL I-196/Bus. US 31 crossed into Ottawa County and turned northeasterly on Michigan Avenue. Michigan Avenue ends at an intersection with State Street and 19th Street, and the business loop turned due north on River Street into downtown. The business loop split along the one-way pairing of 7th and 9th streets in downtown. The northbound direction ran eastward on 9th Street while the southbound direction was routed two blocks north on 7th street. On the eastern side of downtown at Lincoln Street, southbound traffic was routed on 8th Street., and one block further east, both directions followed 8th Street. At Chicago Drive, BL I-196/Bus. US 31 turned northeasterly to follow that street out downtown. Bus. US 31 ended at an interchange with US 31 in Holland Township while BL I-196 continued northeasterly on Chicago Drive.

The initial bypass of Holland, rerouting US 31 out of downtown opened in 1954. The former routing through downtown was redesignated as Bus. US 31 at this time. The first segment of I-196/US 31 freeway in the Holland area opened in 1963, adding an interchange to the southern terminus of Bus. US 31. In 1974, the I-196 bypass around Holland was completed, and Chicago Drive east of US 31 becomes a business route for I-196. By 1976, this business route was extended along Bus. US 31 through downtown as well. In 2004, all of Bus US 31 was decommissioned and BL I-196 was rerouted to follow US 31 around downtown.

Major intersections

County	Location	mi	km	Destinations	Notes
Allegan	Holland	0.000	0.000	BL I-196 south / US 31 / LMCT south A-2 south (Blue Star Highway)	Southern end of BL I-196/LMCT concurrency; northern terminus of A-2
Ottawa	Holland Township	4.120	6.630	US 31 / LMCT south BL I-196 (Chicago Drive)	Northern end of BL I-196/LMCT concurrency
1.000 mi = 1.609 km; 1.000 km = 0.621 mi: Concurrency terminus

== Muskegon alternate route ==
US Highway 31A
- Location: Muskegon
- Length: 4.763 mi (7.665 km)
- Existed: 1932–1941

US Highway 31A (US 31A) was an alternate route through Muskegon. The designation was first commissioned in 1932 for a highway that bypassed downtown Muskegon to the east. In 1940, the alternate route and the mainline highway were flipped through the area, rerouting US 31A to run through downtown. At the same time, US 16 was rerouted to run into Muskegon, partially following US 31A. This last version of US 31A ran northwesterly along Airline Highway and Peck Street into downtown, where US 16 turned westward along M-46. US 31A continued northeasterly along Muskegon Avenue back to US 31 at Marquette Avenue. A year later, the alternate route was redesignated as business loop instead, removing the US 31A designation from the state highway system.

Major intersections
The entire highway is in Muskegon County.

Location	mi	km	Destinations	Notes
Muskegon Heights	0.000	0.000	US 16 east – Grand Rapids; US 31 – Ludington, Holland	Southern end of US 16 concurrency
Muskegon	3.769	6.066	US 16 west / M-46	Northern end of US 16 concurrency
Muskegon	4.763	7.665	US 31 – Ludington, Holland	
1.000 mi = 1.609 km; 1.000 km = 0.621 mi: Concurrency terminus

== Muskegon business loop ==
Business US Highway 31
- Location: Muskegon
- Length: 9.870 mi (15.884 km)
- Existed: 1941–present
- Tourist routes: Lake Michigan Circle Tour; West Michigan Pike Pure Michigan Byway

Business US Highway 31 (Bus. US 31) is a 9.87-mile-long (15.88 km) business loop running through the Muskegon area. It starts in Norton Shores and an interchange with US 31 as the westward continuation of Interstate 96 (I-96) and continues as a freeway for about a mile (1.5 km) before downgrading to an expressway with Michigan left turns near the Muskegon County Airport. The business loop runs along the southern edge of Muskegon Heights and then turns northward near the Roosevelt Park city line. This north–south segment forms the boundary between commercial properties to the west and residential neighborhoods to the east as far north as the intersection with Broadway Avenue. North of Sherman Avenue, the business loop crosses into the city of Muskegon and runs through commercial properties on Seaway Drive. As it approaches Muskegon Lake, Bus. US 31 turns northeasterly along Shoreline Drive, running around the northern edge of downtown. On the northeastern corner of downtown, the business loop turns sharply northeasterly along Moses J. Jones Parkway. Along this parkway segment, Bus. US 31 meets the southern terminus of M-120 and turns easterly along a freeway segment in Muskegon Township to terminate at US 31.

The first bypass of Muskegon opened to traffic in 1932 to the east of downtown; it was designated US 31A. This first alternate route and the mainline were flipped in 1940, routing US 31A through downtown (partially along a section of US 16) and US 31 along the bypass. In 1941, US 31A was redesignated Bus. US 31. The business route was extended on each end in 1950 or 1951 when the mainline was shifted further out of the city to the east. At the end of the 1950s, the US 31 bypass east of Muskegon was converted to a freeway, and the southern section of the business loop was rerouted to follow Seaway Drive. When US 16 was decommissioned in the state in 1962, the section of US 16/Bus. US 16 is redesignated BS I-196, and the following year, it becomes BS I-96; Bus. US 31 remains in place through both changes.

The northern end of the business loop near downtown was rerouted onto the one-way pairing of Muskegon and Webster avenues in 1965. In 1984, the BS I-96 designated into Muskegon was decommissioned. The northern section of Bus. US 31 near downtown was rerouted again, this time to follow Shoreline Drive, in 2007. In 2016, all of the business loop was designated as a part of the West Michigan Pike Pure Michigan Byway.

Major intersections
The entire highway is in Muskegon County.

Location	mi	km	Destinations	Notes
Norton Shores	0.000	0.000	US 31 south / LMCT – Ludington, Holland I-96 east – Grand Rapids	Southern end of LMCT concurrency; eastern terminus of I-96; exit 1 on I-96; exit 110 on US 31
Norton Shores	0.905	1.456	Western end of freeway	
Muskegon	5.613– 5.767	9.033– 9.281	Muskegon Avenue, Webster Avenue	Northbound exit to Muskegon Avenue and southbound entrance from Webster Avenue; former routing of Bus. US 31
Muskegon	8.172– 8.381	13.152– 13.488	M-120 north – North Muskegon	Southern terminus of M-120
Muskegon–Muskegon Township line	8.687	13.980	Western end of freeway	
Muskegon Township	9.870	15.884	US 31 north / LMCT – Ludington, Holland	Northern end of LMCT concurrency; exit 116 on US 31
1.000 mi = 1.609 km; 1.000 km = 0.621 mi: Concurrency terminus; Incomplete access

== Whitehall–Montague ==
Business US Highway 31
- Location: Whitehall–Montague
- Length: 4.680 mi (7.532 km)
- Existed: 1964–present
- Tourist routes: Lake Michigan Circle Tour; West Michigan Pike Pure Michigan Byway

Business US Highway 31 (Bus. US 31) is a business loop running through Whitehall and Montague. It starts at an interchange with US 31 in Whitehall Township east of the city of Whitehall and runs westward on Colby Street past a cluster of businesses. Farther west, Bus. US 31 runs through residential areas before entering downtown Whitehall and turning northward on Thompson Street to cross the White River near its mouth on White Lake. On the northern side of the river, the business loop follows Dowling Street in Montague and then turns north-northeasterly on Water Street through downtown. Bus. US 31 exits downtown and passes through a residential area before leaving Montague. North of town, the business loop runs past various businesses and next to farm fields to an intersection with B-15 (Fruitvale Road) in Montague Township. The business loop turns eastward and runs concurrently with the county highway for a short distance to an interchange with US 31 that marks the northern terminus of the business loop.

A freeway bypass of Whitehall and Montague opened in 1964, and the former routing of US 31 through the downtowns of the two cities was redesignated Bus. US 31. At the northern end, the routing split to follow two connections with the new freeway, running east on Fruitvale Road and running north on Whitehall Road. B-15 was designated in 1970, overlapping the business loop at the northern end. The bifurcated northern connection to the freeway was removed in 1975 when the next segment of US 31 opened heading north into Oceana County. In 2016, all of the business loop was designated as a part of the West Michigan Pike Pure Michigan Byway.

Major intersections
The entire highway is in Muskegon County.

Location	mi	km	Destinations	Notes
Whitehall Township	0.000	0.000	US 31 / LMCT south – Ludington, Muskegon	Southern end of LMCT concurrency; exit 128 on US 31
Montague Township	4.199	6.758	B-15 north (Fruitvale Road) – Pentwater	Western end of B-15 concurrency
Montague Township	4.680	7.532	US 31 north / LMCT – Ludington, Muskegon B-15 north B-86 east (Fruitvale Road)	Northern end of LMCT concurrency; eastern end of B-15 concurrency; western terminus of B-86; exit 131 on US 31
1.000 mi = 1.609 km; 1.000 km = 0.621 mi: Concurrency terminus

== Hart ==
Business US Highway 31
- Location: Hart
- Length: 2.138 mi (3.441 km)
- Existed: 1987–2025

Business US Highway 31 (Bus. US 31) was a 2.1-mile-long (3.4 km) business spur running into the Hart downtown area. It started at exit 149 on US 31 in Hart Township and ran eastward along Polk Road into the southern part of the city. The business spur passed some commercial properties along Polk Road before turning northward on State Street next to the Oceana County Fairgrounds. Bus. US 31 passed more businesses before entering a residential area. The business spur terminated at the intersection with Johnson Street in Hart.

A segment of US 31 freeway opened from the Polk Road interchange northward to Monroe Road southeast of Pentwater in 1978. At that time, US 31 was rerouted out of Hart. The former routing along Polk Road and State Street was designated as Bus. US 31 in 1987 and turned back to local control in 2025.

Major intersections
The entire highway was in Oceana County.

Location	mi	km	Destinations	Notes
Hart Township	0.000	0.000	US 31 / LMCT – Ludington, Muskegon	Exit 149 on US 31
Hart	2.138	3.441	Johnson Street; State Street	Roadway continues northward as State Street
1.000 mi = 1.609 km; 1.000 km = 0.621 mi

== Pentwater ==
Business US Highway 31
- Location: Pentwater
- Length: 7.151 mi (11.508 km)
- Existed: 1955–May 4, 2023
- Tourist routes: Lake Michigan Circle Tour; West Michigan Pike Pure Michigan Byway

Business US Highway 31 (Bus. US 31) was a 7.2-mile-long (11.6 km) business loop running through the Pentwater downtown area. It started at an interchange on US 31 in Weare Township southeast of Pentwater. It ran westward and northwesterly along Monroe Road and across the Pentwater River through a rural wooded area. The business loop intersected B-15 at that county highway's northern terminus in Pentwater Township on the shores of Pentwater Lake. The business loop followed the northern shore of the lake and then turned west on 6th Street through a residential area into the village of Pentwater. In downtown, Bus. US 31 turned northward along Hancock Street. The business loop exited downtown and passed through another residential area on the north side of the village before exiting town northeast of Charles Mears State Park. Bus. US 31 meandered through rural woodlands north of Pentwater as it approached the Oceana–Mason county line near Bass Lake. The business loop turned eastward, briefly following the county line before turning southeasterly to an interchange with US 31 on the Pentwater–Weare township line.

US 31 was rerouted to run further east of Pentwater in 1955, and the former route through the village was redesignated as Bus. US 31 at that time. In 1978, a section of US 31 freeway opened between Hart and Pentwater. Bus. US 31 was slightly truncated on its southern end to terminate at the new freeway interchange, and part of Monroe Road was redesignated as the mainline of US 31 between the end of the freeway and the former routing of US 31. The next freeway segment opened in 1980, and Bus. US 31 was slightly lengthened to connect to the new freeway interchange with Oceana Road. resulting in the current configuration. In 2016, all of the business loop was dedicated as a part of the West Michigan Pike Pure Michigan Byway. The segment of highway within the village of Pentwater was transferred to the control of the village on May 4, 2023, and the remainder of the highway was to have its signage removed, remaining an unsigned state trunkline highway. The remainder was transferred to county control on May 18, 2023, and reclassified as primary county roads.

Major intersections

County	Location	mi	km	Destinations	Notes
Oceana	Weare Township	0.000	0.000	US 31 / LMCT – Ludington, Muskegon	Southern end of LMCT concurrency; exit 154 on US 31
Oceana	Pentwater Township	1.394	2.243	B-15 south	Northern terminus of B-15
Oceana–Mason county line	No major junctions				
Oceana	Pentwater–Weare township line	7.151	11.508	US 31 / LMCT – Ludington, Muskegon	Northern end of LMCT concurrency; exit 158 on US 31
1.000 mi = 1.609 km; 1.000 km = 0.621 mi: Concurrency terminus

== Ludington ==
Business US Highway 31
- Location: Ludington
- Length: 3.172 mi (5.105 km)
- Existed: 2005–present
- Tourist routes: West Michigan Pike Pure Michigan Byway

Business US Highway 31 (Bus. US 31) is a 3.2-mile-long (5.1 km) business spur running into the Ludington downtown area. The highway starts at exit 166 on the US 31 and follows Pere Marquette Highway northwesterly and northward toward Ludington. The business spur crosses the Pere Marquette River near Pere Marquette Lake. North of the river, Bus. US 31 passes through an industrial area on the edge of Ludington in Pere Marquette Township. The business spur terminates at an intersection with US 10 east of downtown.

Ludington was bypassed in 1989 with the extension of the US 31 freeway in Mason County. The former route of US 31 along Pere Marquette Highway north of the freeway was retained as an unsigned highway. In 2005, it was designated as Bus. US 31. In 2016, the business route was dedicated as a part of the West Michigan Pike Pure Michigan Byway.

Major intersections
The entire highway is in Pere Marquette Township, Mason County.

mi	km	Destinations	Notes
0.000	0.000	US 31 / LMCT – Ludington, Muskegon	
3.172	5.105	US 10 to US 31 – Ludington, Manistee, Reed City	Northern terminus of Bus. US 31
1.000 mi = 1.609 km; 1.000 km = 0.621 mi
