= Clear Springs Nature Preserve =

Nature preserve in Michigan, US

Coordinates: 43.441529°N 86.332027°W

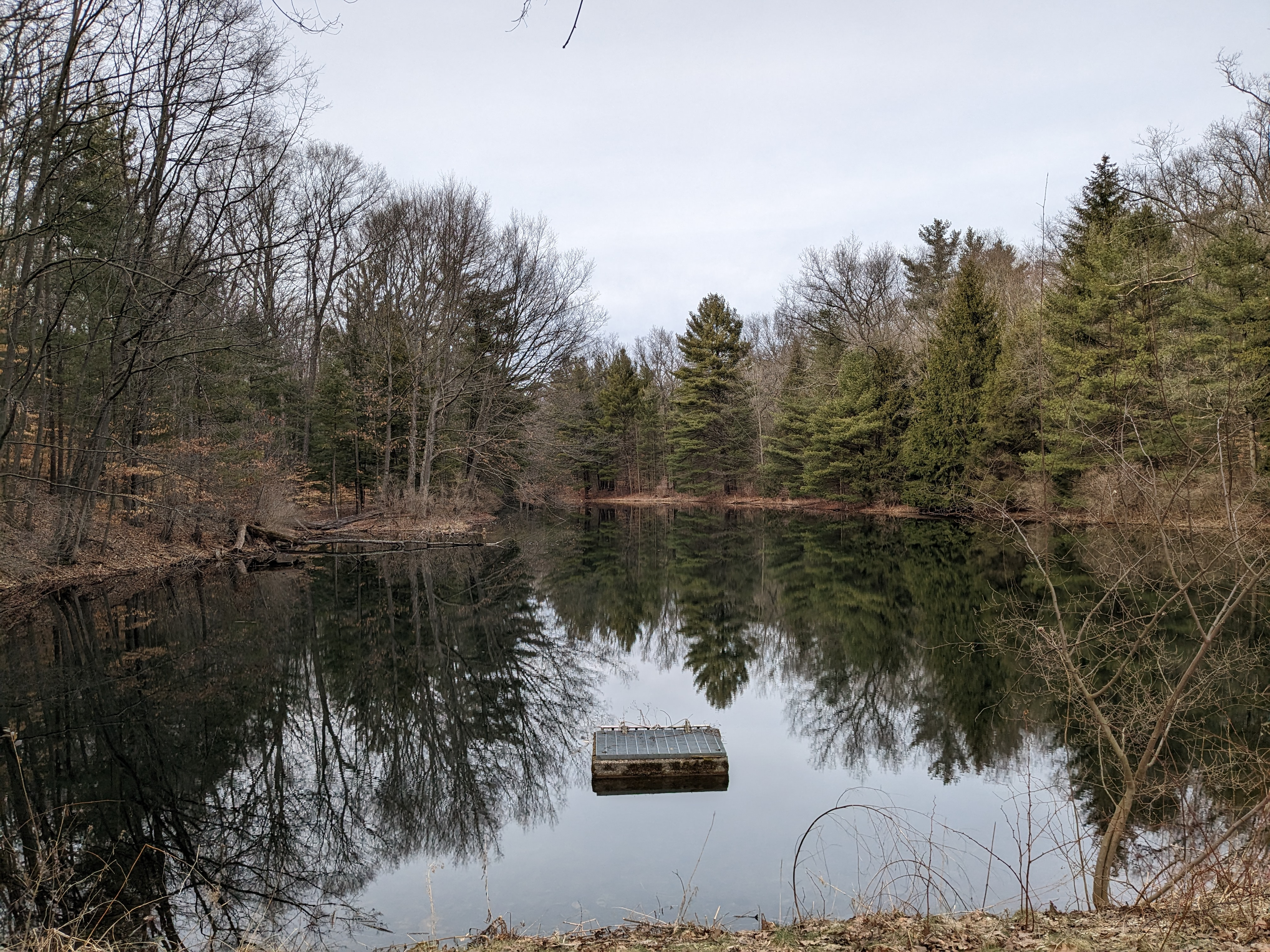
- A view of the pond
- Length: 2.6 miles (4.2 km)
- Location: Montague Township, Michigan, United States
- Established: 2000
- Use: Hiking, Dog walking, Canoeing, Picnicking
- Difficulty: Easy
- Season: All
- Surface: Dirt
- Route of all trails (in red)
Trail map

Clear Springs Nature Preserve is a nature preserve located in Montague Township, Michigan, less than half a mile from the interchange between US Highway 31 (US 31) and Business US 31 near Montague. It is heavily forested and features a pond, a creek, and six different hiking trails, the Rim Trail, Pond Side Trail, Crest Trail, Spring Trail, East Boundary Trail, and West Boundary Trail. These trails can be hiked in two different loop distances. The long loop goes from Spring Trail to the West Boundary trail to the Rim Trail, and ends with the East Boundary Trail, a total of 1.5 mils (3.8×10^{−8} km) while the short loop goes from Spring Trail to the Pond Side Trail and ends with the Rim Trail, a total of 0.9 miles (1.4 km). In total, there are 2.6 miles (4.2 km) of hiking trails. There are no other developed facilities except for a donation box, map display, and a small dirt parking area located at the main entrance near Fruitvale Road and the US 31 interchange, while the other entrance is located at Walsh Road. The nature preserve also has many benches and signposts that inform visitors of the many different species and tree types, most notably the red pine tree.

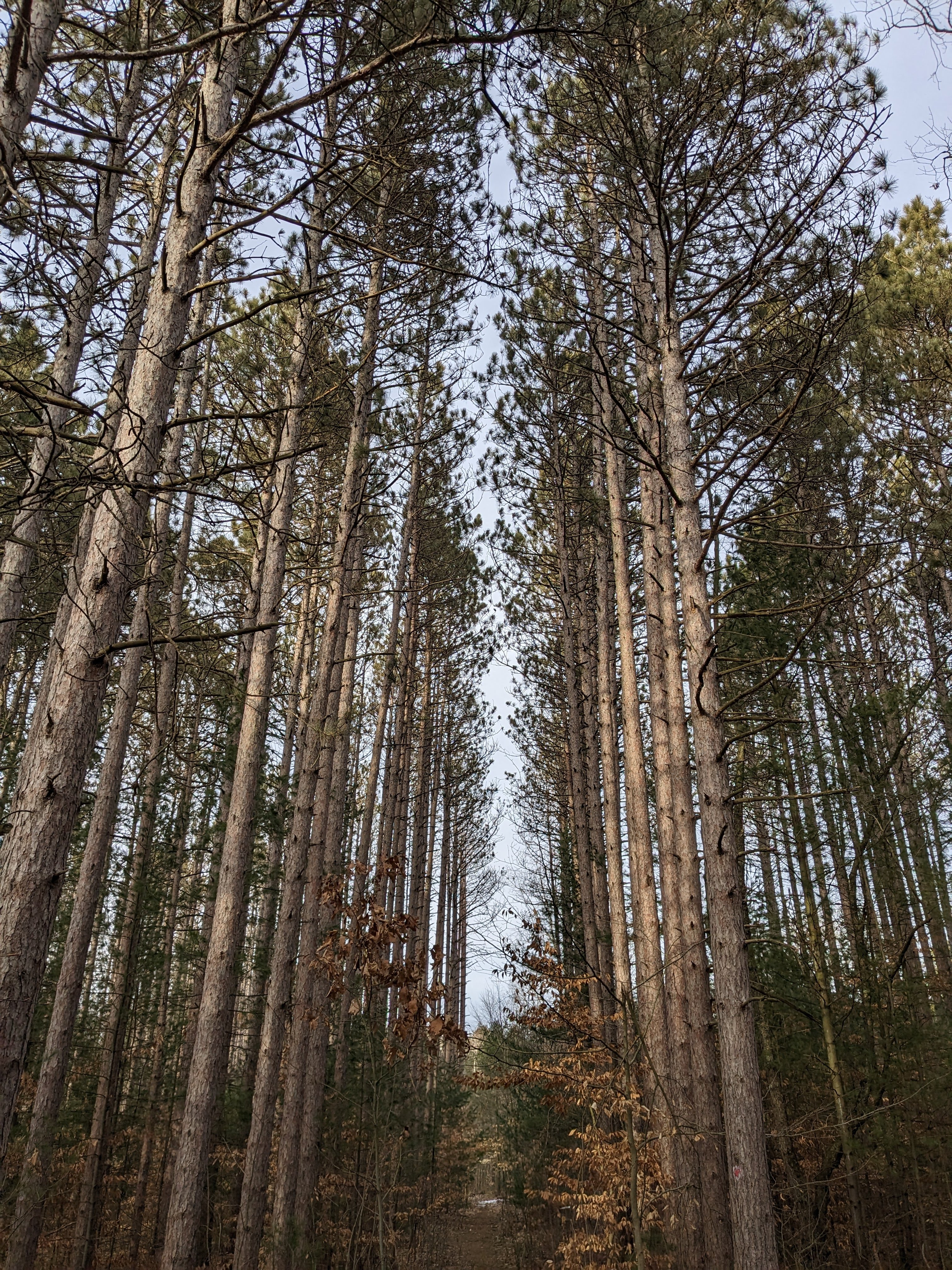
Red Pine trees

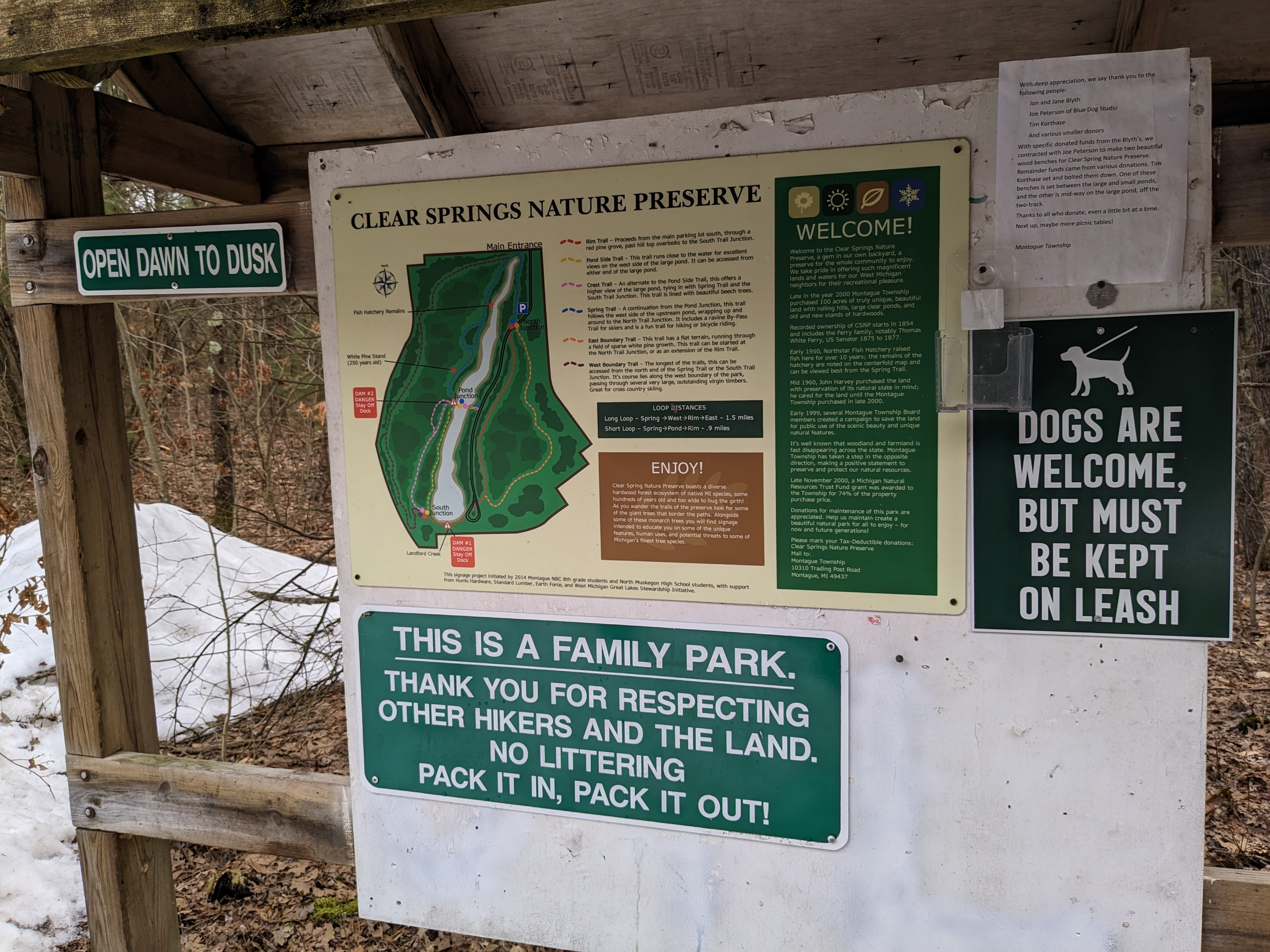
Information board

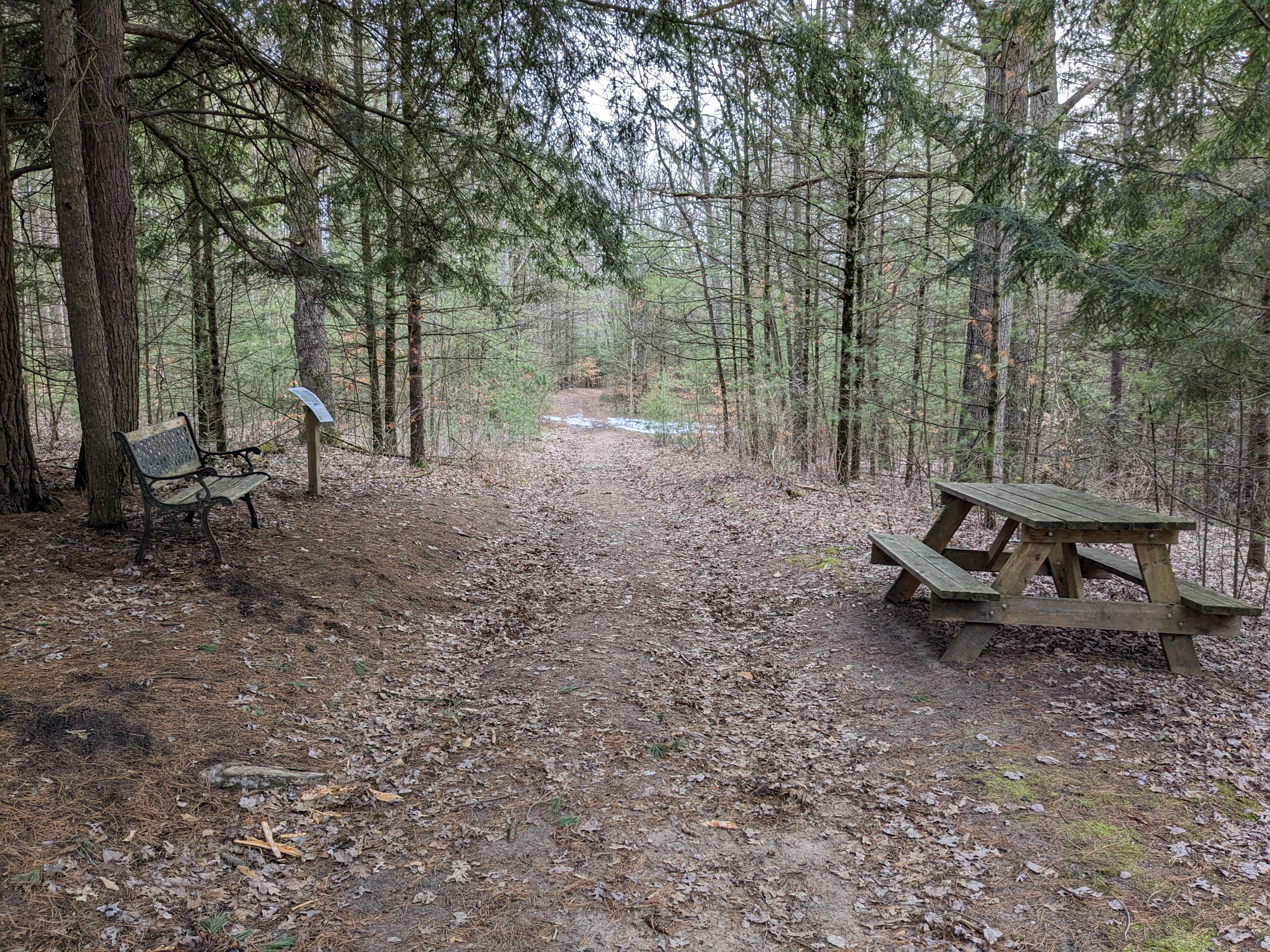
One of the trails with a bench, informational sign, and picnic table.

== History ==
In 1848, the land was used for one of the first trading posts in the Montague area. Later in the 1800s, U.S. Senator Thomas W. Ferry owned the land; the only Michigan senator to have held position in multiple congresses, (44th and 45th) and the only Michigan politician to be the president pro tempore of the United States Senate. In the 1940s and early 1950s, the property would be home to North Star Fishery, where fish were raised on the property for over 10 years, with the remains of a hatchery viewable from the Spring trail. In 1960, John Harvey would purchase the land because he wanted to preserve the nature. He would maintain the land until the 1990s, when plans were made for the property to be turned into a 90-home housing district, however Montague Township would end up buying the land in 2000 for $950,000 (equivalent to $1.64 million in 2024); $703,000 (equivalent to $1.21 million in 2024) came from a Michigan Natural Trust Fund to preserve the nature. On September 28, 2016, the donation box located at the main entrance was cut open and money was stolen.

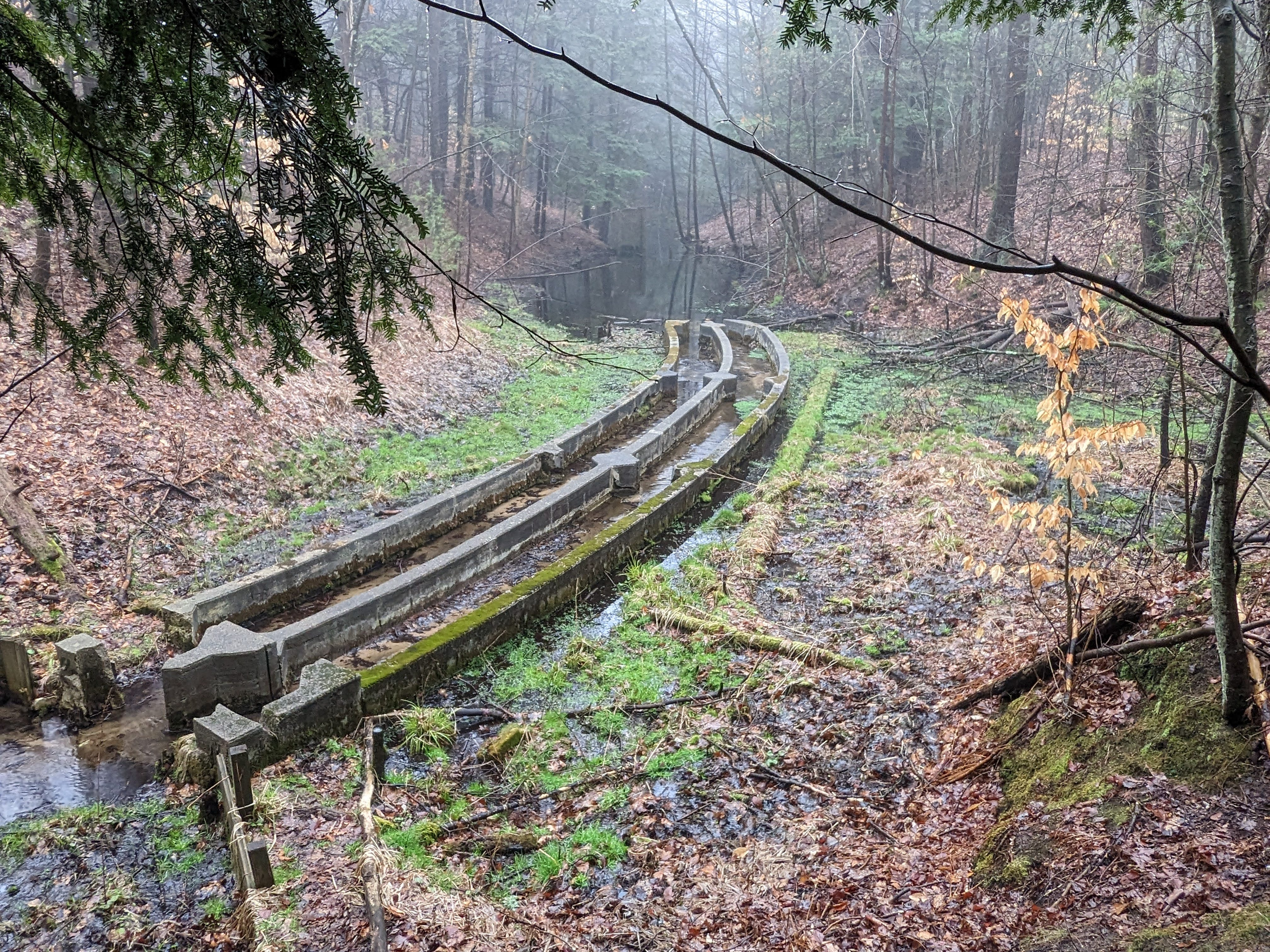
Remains of a fishing hatchery
