= Pure Michigan Byway =

Segment of the State Trunkline Highway System

Pure Michigan Byways
- Highway marker for Pure Michigan Byways
- Map of the Pure Michigan Byways; Historic Recreational Scenic

System information
- Maintained by MDOT
- Length: 1,259.880 mi (2,027.580 km)
- Formed: June 22, 1993

Highway names
- Interstates: Interstate nn (I-nn)
- US Highways: US Highway nn (US nn)
- State: M-nn

System links
- Michigan State Trunkline Highway System; Interstate; US; State; Byways

A Pure Michigan Byway is the designation for a segment of the State Trunkline Highway System in the US state of Michigan that is a "scenic, recreational, or historic route that is representative of Michigan's natural and cultural heritage." The designation was created with the name Michigan Heritage Route by the state legislature on June 22, 1993, and since then six historic, seven recreational and seven scenic byways have been designated by the Michigan Department of Transportation (MDOT), and another two have been proposed. These byways have been designated in both the Upper and Lower peninsulas (UP, LP) of the state. The current name was adopted on December 30, 2014, and it references the Pure Michigan tourism marketing campaign.

To be listed as a Pure Michigan Byway, a road must be a state trunkline highway, and it must be nominated through a two-stage process. Candidates are evaluated based on a set of objective criteria by MDOT in a process that can take several years to complete. The criteria include a highway's relationship to sites or districts on the National Register of Historic Places, to recreational areas, or to scenic landscapes. Each candidate must be supported by local stakeholders, including the appropriate local units of government. Each byway has a local organization that produces a management plan for the roadway and the preservation of its surrounding environment.

== Program ==
According to MDOT, the department's Pure Michigan Byway Program works with local communities, organizations, and government agencies to identify roads that access Michigan's "unique recreational, scenic and historic cultural treasures". The program also attempts to preserve the unique and irreplaceable qualities of selected corridors, improve distinct roads in a careful and considerate way, and promote a greater awareness of and appreciation for the state's scenic, recreational, historical and cultural resources, according to the Federal Highway Administration. These actions provide economic benefits by stimulating tourism. Staffers for State Representative Peter Pettalia of Presque Isle said that the point of the program, in context of the 2014 change to the Pure Michigan Byway name, was to get people to drive the selected roads and spend money at local businesses.

Additions to the system are made when local organizations apply to MDOT through a two-stage process. First, a local organization proposes the addition, verifying that the suggested byway is a state trunkline highway and noting which local governments support the designation. MDOT reviews this pre-application to determine initial eligibility. If the proposed byway is determined to be eligible, the organization is asked to submit a full application to the department for approval. The full process can take up to seven years to complete. The MDOT director compiles a report annually that is submitted to the governor, members of the Michigan Legislature and members of the State Transportation Commission; this report details any new additions in the previous year and any changes or deletions affecting the system.

== Types and requirements ==
The three types of byways are defined in Public Act 69 of 1993, the legislation that originally established the system. The Legislature defined these types to be:

Historic
significant to the history, archeology, architecture, engineering, or culture of this state.
Recreational
facilities normally associated with leisure-time activities, including, but not limited to, parks, public access sites, wildlife refuges, forest areas, marinas, swimming areas, hiking trails, and sightseeing areas.
Scenic
an area of outstanding natural beauty whose features include, but are not limited to, significant natural features such as vegetation, land form, water, and open areas with exceptional vistas and views, that singly or in combination make that area unique and distinct in character.

In his annual report to the State Legislature at the end of 2014, MDOT Director Kirk Steudle described an additional three categories of byway not listed in the legislation setting up the system.

Cultural
A state highway traversing an area with unique cultural and/or ethnic heritage amenities such as art galleries, theaters, opera houses, restaurants, markets, and music venues.
Archaeological
A state highway traversing a corridor with ruins, artifacts, and structural remains.
Natural
A state highway that traverses a corridor with natural features that are relatively undisturbed, unique geological landforms, vegetation, water bodies, or conservation areas.

In establishing specific objective criteria related to the selection of potential byways, MDOT has set up limitations on these classifications. Regardless of classification, all byways are supported with a management plan for the corridor designed to deal with protection, preservation, and enhancement of the roadway. All routes are given specific termini points with a reasonable length. They must also have the backing of local units of government, landowners and organizations. No specific criteria have been published for cultural, archaeological or natural byways.

Historic byways are assessed based on the numbers of sites listed, or eligible for listing, on the National Register of Historic Places. These sites need to be visible from the route of the byway, or, in the case of historic districts, a "substantial portion of the district must lie adjacent to the highway". Local organizations backing a proposed historic byway must also have promotional plans and demonstrate coordination with state agencies related to state history.

Recreational byways must be used mainly for recreational purposes, connecting to one or more recreation sites. They can also connect multiple sites together with a common theme, and they are assessed on their scenic qualities with lower inclusion standards than scenic byways.

Scenic byways must exclude commercial or industrial zones adjacent to the trunkline. These roads are also assessed on qualities such as the uniqueness, vividness, intactness, unity, and viewshed of the roadway and its surrounding environment as set up in department guidelines.

== History ==
Michigan Heritage Route signage
Before the system's name was changed in 2014, these signs were used for Historic, Recreational and Scenic Heritage Routes; new signs were unveiled in October 2015.

The Michigan Heritage Route System was created after Public Act 69 of 1993 was signed into law on June 22, 1993, going into effect immediately. The law required MDOT to set up specific criteria and procedures related to selecting and maintaining heritage routes, subject to approval of the Legislature. Since the program was put into operation in 1993, 16 heritage routes have been approved by the department. The first two were approved in 1995 at opposite ends of the state: a scenic route along US Highway 41 (US 41) in the Keweenaw Peninsula region of the northern UP and a historic route along M-125 in downtown Monroe in the southeastern corner of the LP. The first recreational route was approved in 1998 along M-15 in the southeastern LP. Since 2008, local groups have proposed the creation of a heritage route along the former West Michigan Pike (US 31) on the western side of the LP and a loop around Ontonagon County in the western UP. In a department report dated December 22, 2014, the UP byway was no longer under active proposal, and the West Michigan Pike was dedicated on July 25, 2016.

The Legislature proposed another change to the system in 2013 to rename the Heritage Routes in the system to Pure Michigan Byways under a bill introduced in the state House of Representatives. The bill passed in the House in March 2014, and the state Senate during the lame duck session in December 2014. Sponsors of the bill said that including the highways in the Pure Michigan tourism advertising campaign would provide promotional benefits, and they stated that the change "allows the state to comply with federal changes, which require the word 'route' be changed to 'byway'." The bill received the governor's signature and was filed on December 30, 2014, taking effect as Public Act 445 that day. MDOT had one year from that effective date to obtain a trademark license from the Michigan Economic Development Corporation, owners of the Pure Michigan trademark, and to unveil the new signage bearing the updated program name. They unveiled the new signage as part of the dedication of the M-134 North Huron Byway in October 2015.

== List ==
There are six historic, seven recreational and six scenic byways in Michigan, with one additional route proposed.

List of Pure Michigan Byways
Type	Name	Length (mi)	Length (km)	Southern or western terminus	Northern or eastern terminus	Date	Description	Ref(s).
Proposed	Bridge to the Clouds	82.389	132.592	Loop in Ontonagon County		—	Would follow US 45, M-26, M-38, M-64, and M-28 connecting Bruce Crossing, Ontonagon, Silver City and Bergland; proposal inactive as of December 22, 2014	
Historic	Center Avenue Heritage Route	1.474	2.372	Madison Avenue in Bay City	Livingston Street in Bay City	1997	Originally named the "Bay City Historic Heritage Route"; follows M-25 through the Center Avenue Neighborhood Residential District in Bay City, which is listed on the National Register of Historic Places	
Recreational	Chief Noonday Trail Recreational Heritage Route	16.963	27.299	US 131 in Bradley	M-43 near Hastings	1998	Follows M-179 in Allegan and Barry counties providing access to Gun Lake and the Yankee Springs State Recreation Area	
Scenic	Copper Country Trail	47.617	76.632	Portage Lake Lift Bridge in Hancock	M-26 in Copper Harbor	1995	Follows US 41 in the Copper Country; also designated as a National Scenic Byway by the Federal Highway Administration; first Scenic Heritage Route in the state	
Recreational	Huron Shores Heritage Route	193.061	310.702	Cedar Street in Standish	Nicolet Avenue in Mackinaw City	2004	Originally named the "Sunrise Side Coastal Highway"; follows US 23 along the Lake Huron shoreline	
Recreational	I-69 Recreational Heritage Route	47.188	75.942	Indiana state line south of Kinderhook	Calhoun–Eaton county line	2004	Follows I-69 from the Indiana state line in Branch and Calhoun counties in the southern Lower Peninsula	
Historic	Iron County Heritage Trail	15.577	25.069	M-189 (4th Avenue) in Iron River	5th Street in Crystal Falls	2000	Follows US 2 through Iron County past sites such as the Iron County Courthouse and the local museums on the area's iron mining heritage	
Scenic	Leelanau Scenic Heritage Route	81.007	130.368	Benzie–Leelanau county line south of Empire	M-72 in Traverse City	2002	Follows M-22 (66.956 mi, 107.755 km) and M-109 (6.831 mi, 10.993 km) around the Leelanau Peninsula, along the Lake Michigan and Grand Traverse Bay shorelines and includes M-204 (7.220 mi, 11.619 km) across the peninsula	
Scenic	M-22 Pure Michigan Byway	49.695	79.976	US 31 north of Manistee	Benzie–Leelanau county line south of Empire	2016	Follows M-22	
Recreational	M-134 North Huron Byway	50.233	80.842	I-75 north of St. Ignace	Four Corners on Drummond Island	2015	Follows M-134 along the Lake Huron shoreline across the southeastern section of the Upper Peninsula and onto Drummond Island	
Historic	Marshall's Territorial Road Heritage Route	2.052	3.302	Western Marshall city limits	Eastern Marshall city limits	2001	Follows Business Loop I-94 along the former Territorial Road in downtown Marshall past 30 historical markers and four museums	
Historic	Monroe Historic Heritage Route	2.115	3.404	Southern Monroe city limits	Northern Monroe city limits	1995	Follows M-125 through downtown Monroe and next to the East Elm–North Macomb Street Historic District, which is listed on the National Register of Historic Places	
Scenic	Old Mission Peninsula Scenic Heritage Route	17.304	27.848	Peninsula Drive north of Traverse City	Cul-de-sac at Old Mission Lighthouse	2008	Follows M-37 along the Old Mission Peninsula north of Traverse City through vineyards and orchards bounded by the East and West arms of Grand Traverse Bay	
Recreational	Pathway to Family Fun Recreational Heritage Route	72.765	117.104	Waldron Road in Clarkston	M-25 in Bay City	1998	Originally named the "Miles to Smiles Recreational Heritage Route"; follows M-15 from Clarkston in Oakland County to Bay City providing access to parks and campgrounds in the area	
Scenic	Tahquamenon Scenic Byway	62.505	100.592	M-28 south of Newberry	M-28 near Eckerman	2007	Originally a locally designated byway in 1998 named the Tahquamenon Heritage Trail and later named the Tahquamenon Scenic Heritage Route when recognized by the state; follows M-123 in an inverted U-shape north of M-28 in Luce and Chippewa counties past the Tahquamenon Falls State Park	
Scenic	Top of the Lake Scenic Byway	92.345	148.615	M-149 at Thompson	I-75 in St. Ignace	2017	Follows US 2 along the northern shoreline of Lake Michigan	
Scenic	Tunnel of Trees Scenic Heritage Route	21.028	33.841	Western Harbor Springs city limits	C-66/C-77 (State Road) in Cross Village	2003	Follows M-119 through the "Tunnel of Trees"	
Recreational	UP Hidden Coast Recreational Heritage Trail	64.451	103.724	Wisconsin state line in Menominee	Mather Avenue in Gladstone	2007	Follows M-35, US 2, and US 41 proving access to recreational areas along the Green Bay and Little Bay de Noc	
Historic	US 12 Heritage Trail	210.367	338.553	Indiana state line in New Buffalo	Woodward Avenue in Detroit	2004	Follows US 12 parallel to the route of an original 19th-century stagecoach trail from Detroit to Chicago across the southern Lower Peninsula, including segments previously designated separately along Michigan Avenue in Saline in May 2001 and in Lenawee County in October 2002	
Historic	West Michigan Pike Pure Michigan Byway	186.658	300.397	Indiana state line south of New Buffalo	Ludington	2016	Follows I-94; M-63; I-196; US 31; the BL I-196 routings for South Haven and Holland; the Bus. US 31 routings for Muskegon, Whitehall–Montague, Pentwater and Ludington; and US 10 parallel to the route of the former West Michigan Pike and along the Lake Michigan shoreline	
Recreational	Woodward Avenue Recreational Heritage Route	25.475	40.998	Jefferson Avenue in Detroit	Cesar E. Chavez Boulevard in Pontiac	1999	Follows M-1 and BL I-75/Bus. US 24 (Woodward Avenue) connecting to museums, theaters and parks in Metro Detroit; also designated the Automotive Heritage Trail All-American Road by the Federal Highway Administration and a part of the MotorCity National Heritage Area	

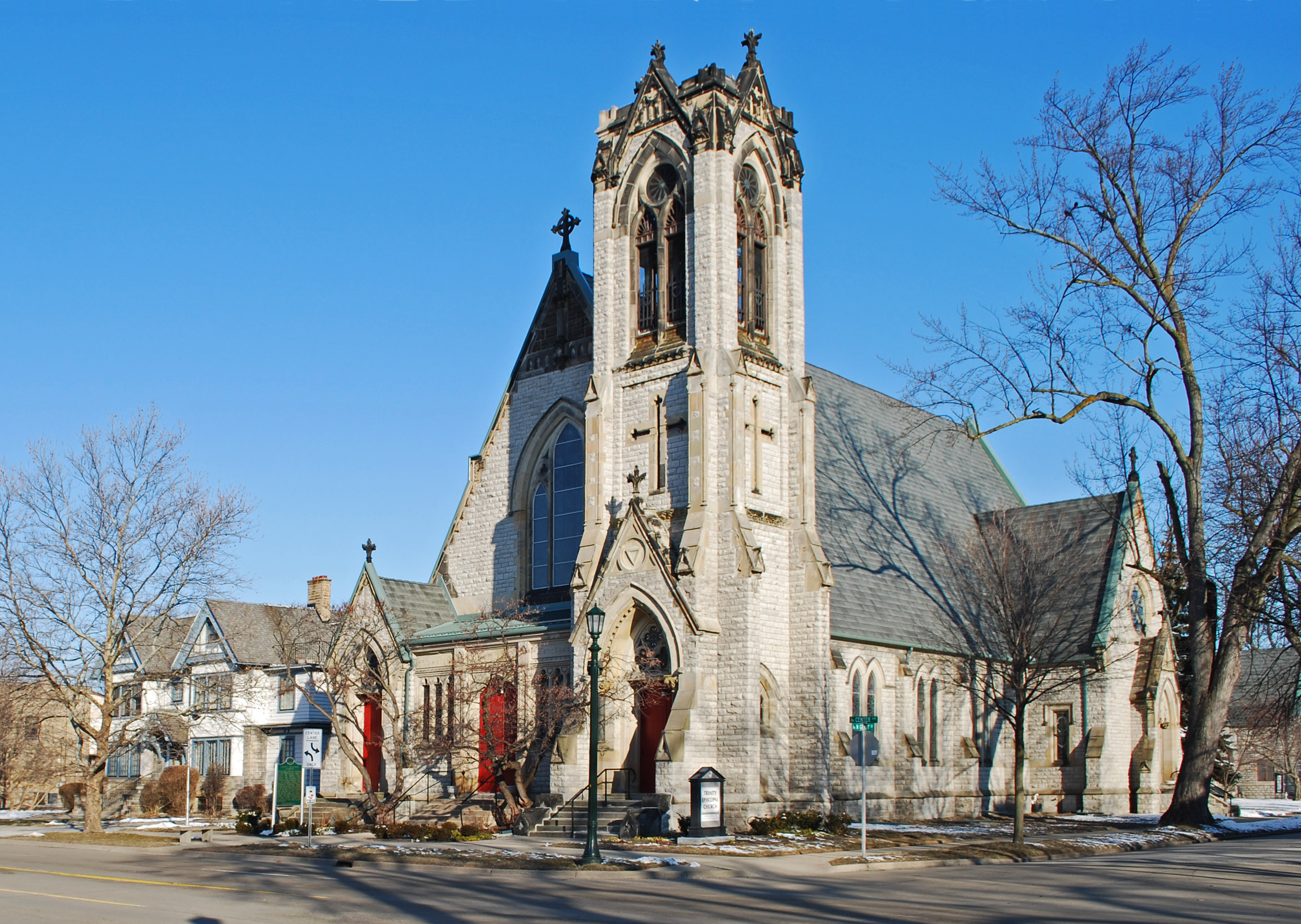
Center Avenue Heritage Route in Bay City

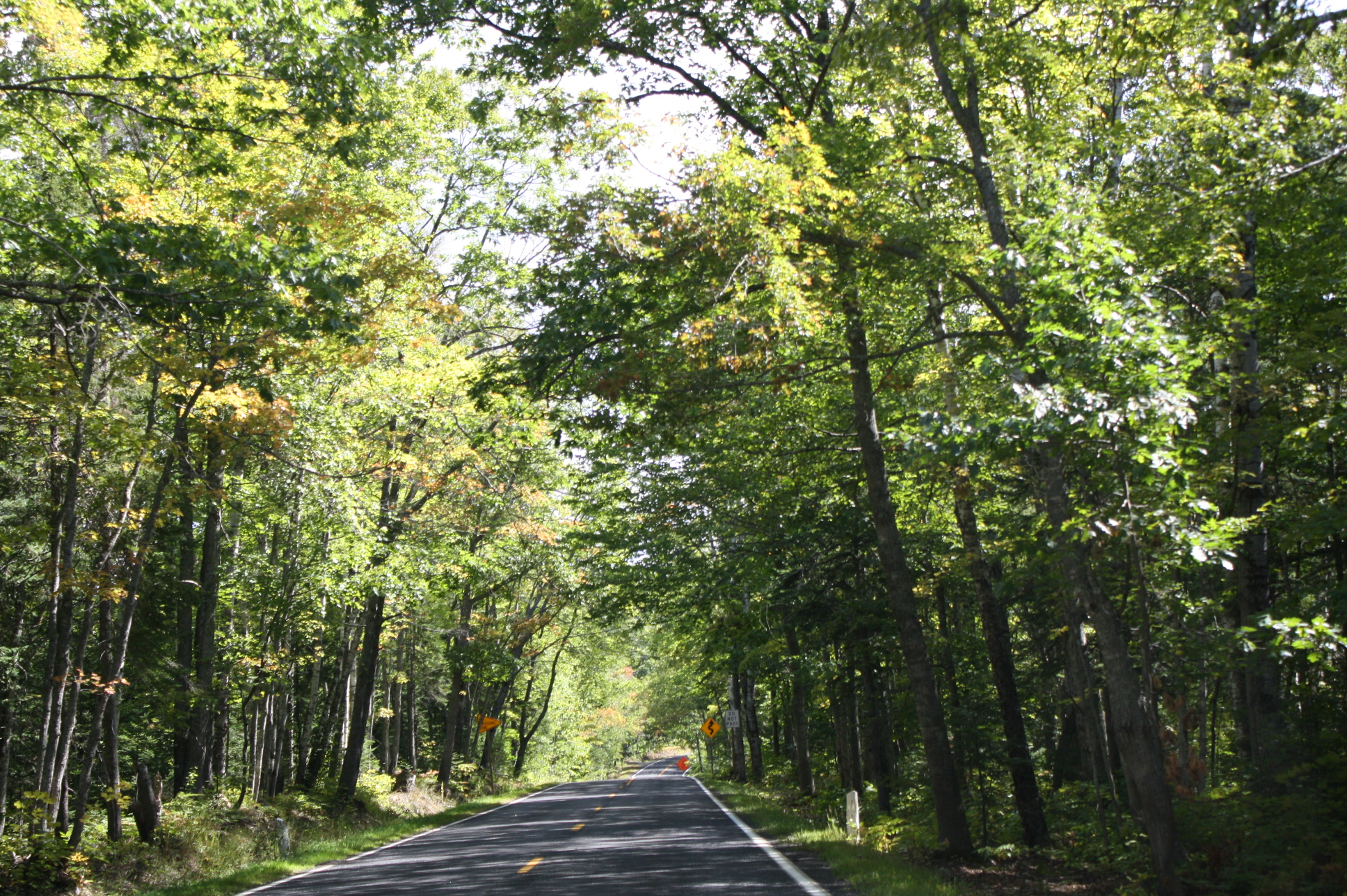
Covered trail section of US 41 south of Copper Harbor, part of the Copper Country Trail

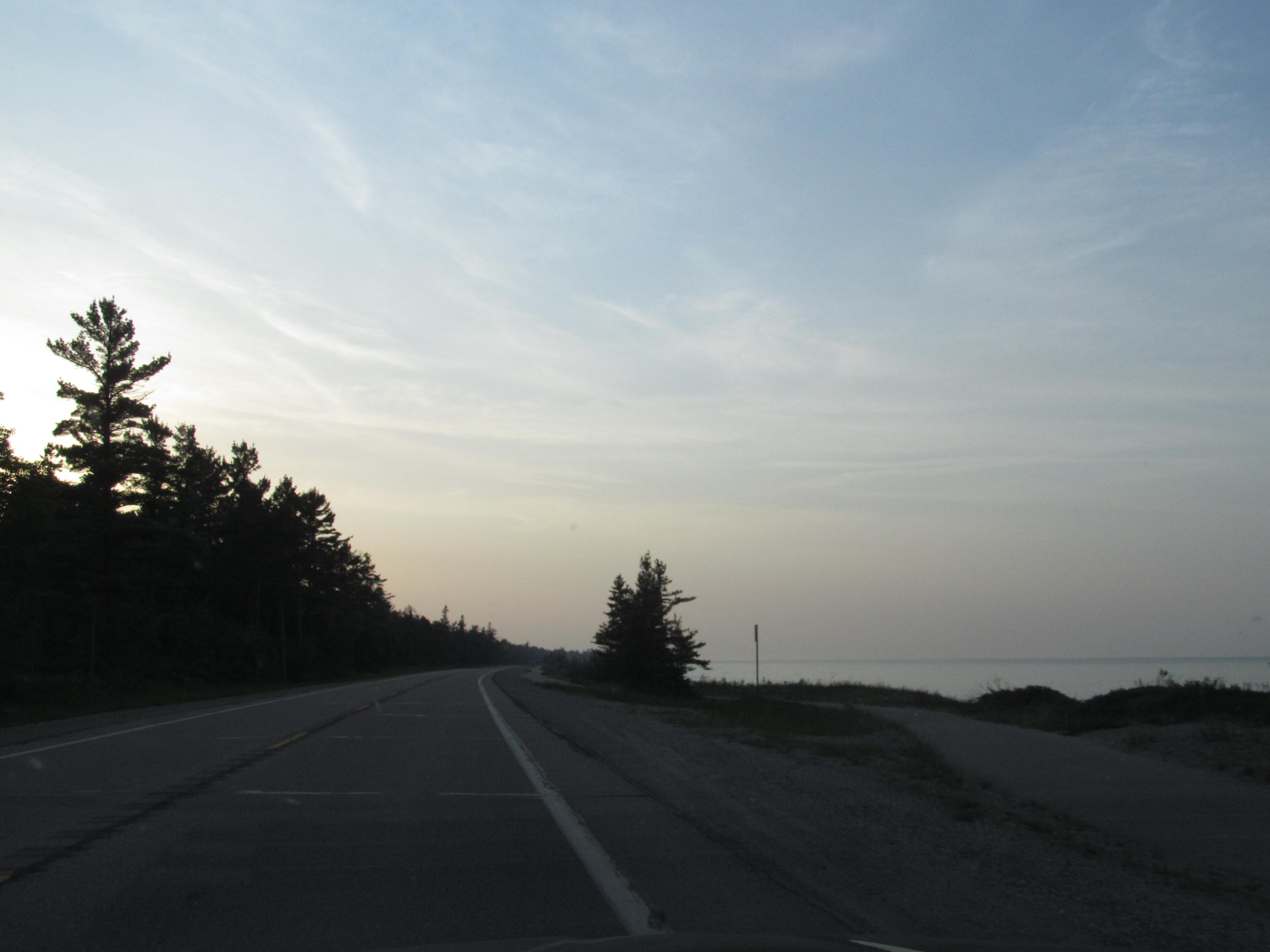
US 23 running next to Lake Huron

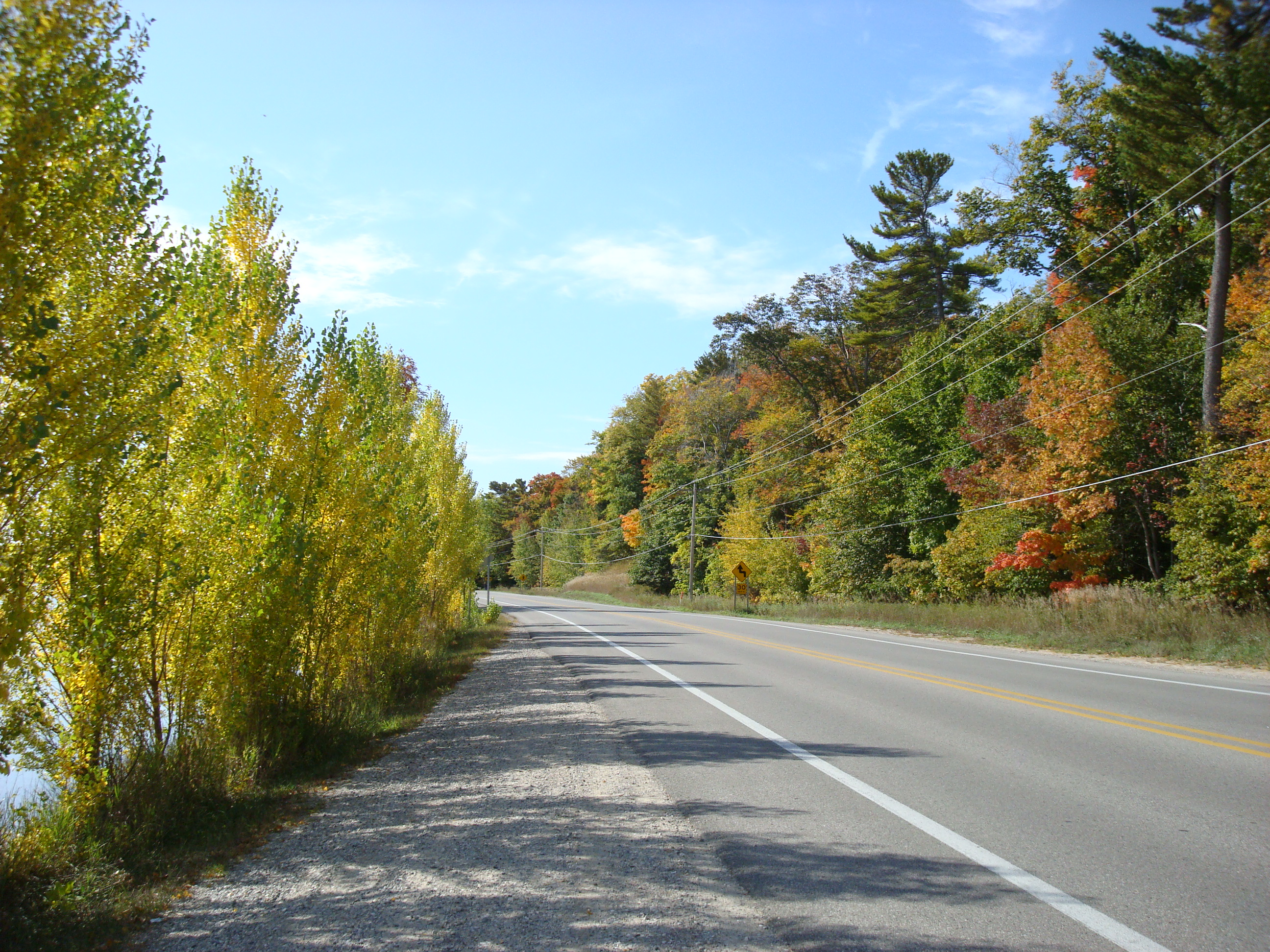
Fall color along M-22, part of the Leelanau Scenic Heritage Route

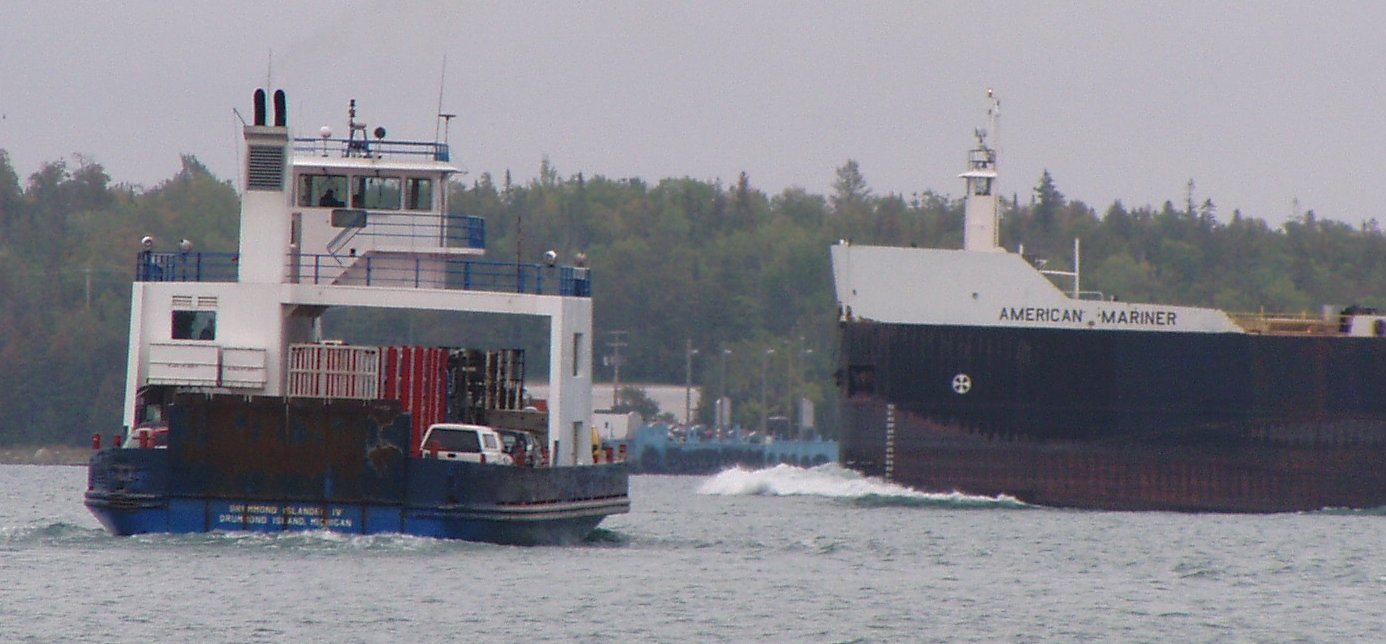
SS Drummond Islander IV carrying M-134 between DeTour Village and Drummond Island

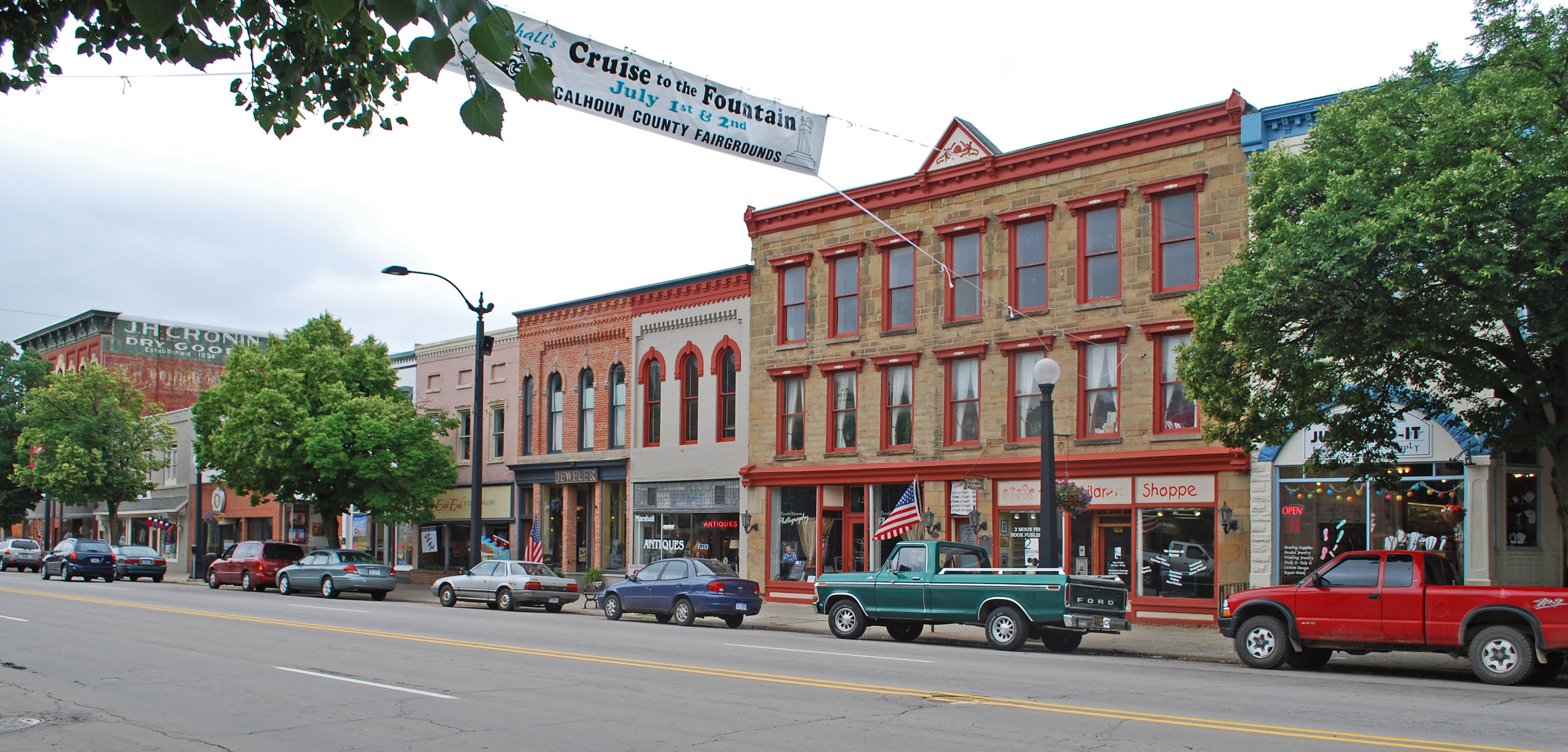
Michigan Avenue downtown Marshall, part of the Territorial Road

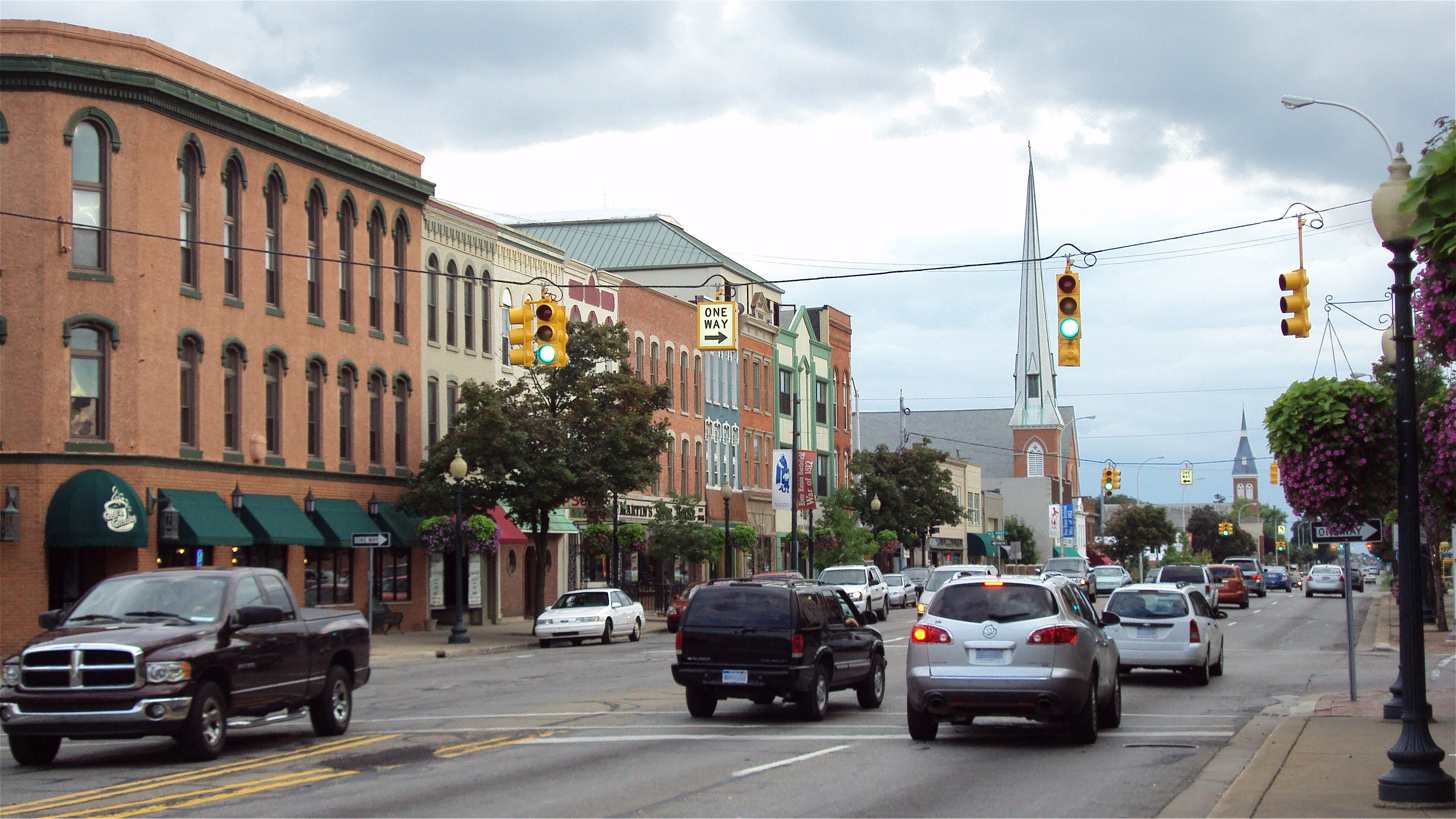
Monroe Street (M-125) downtown Monroe

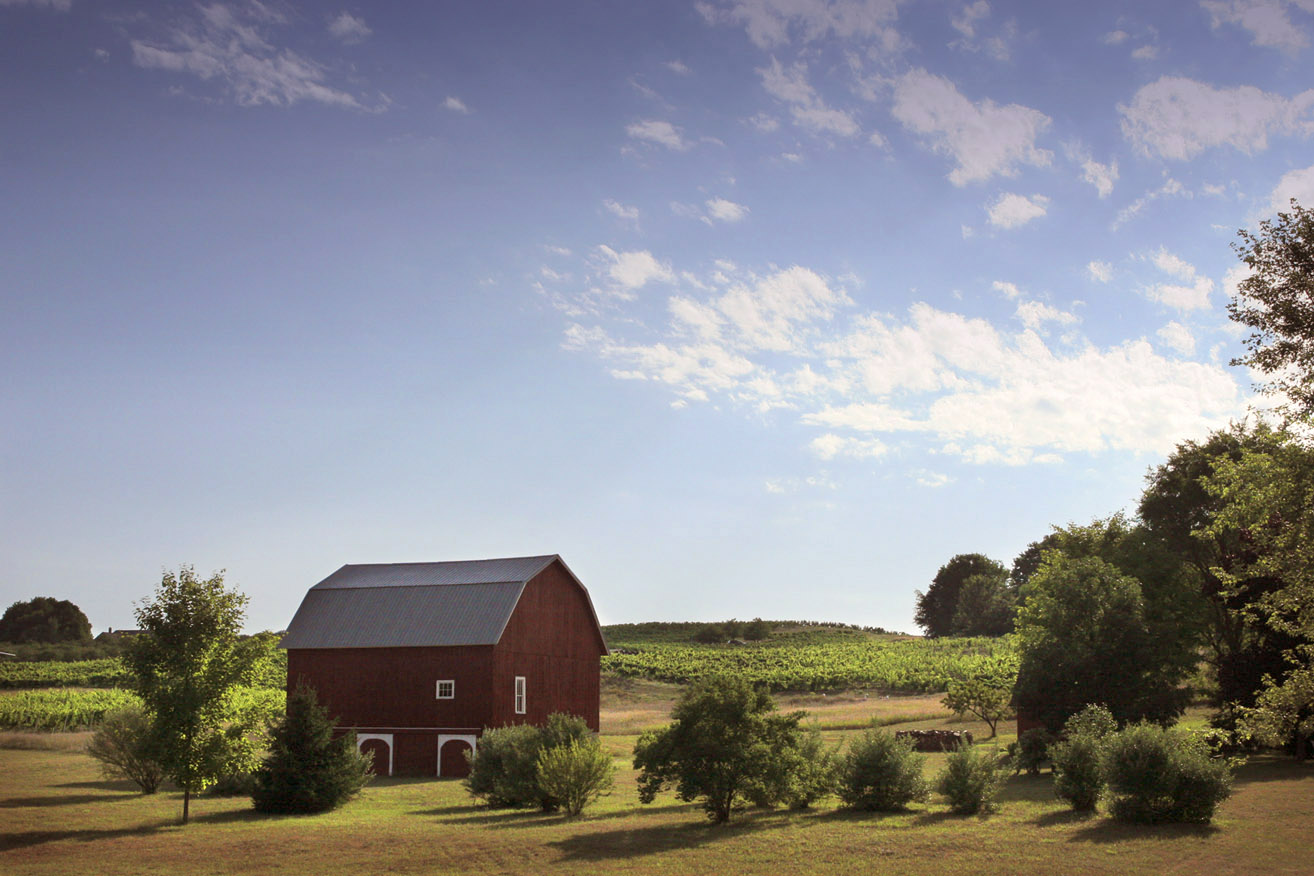
A pastoral farm scene on the Old Mission Peninsula near M-37

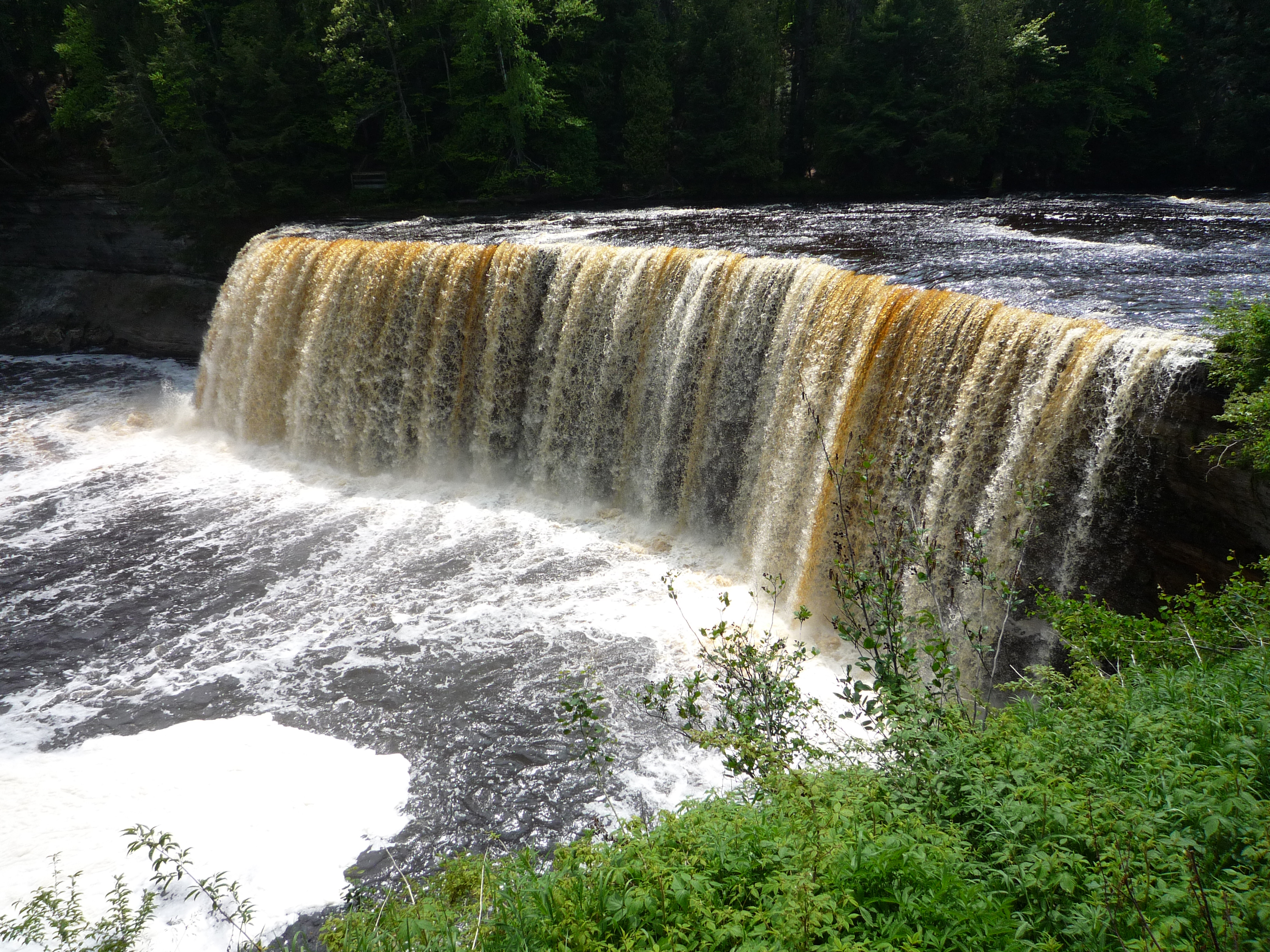
Tahquamenon Falls near M-123 in Luce County

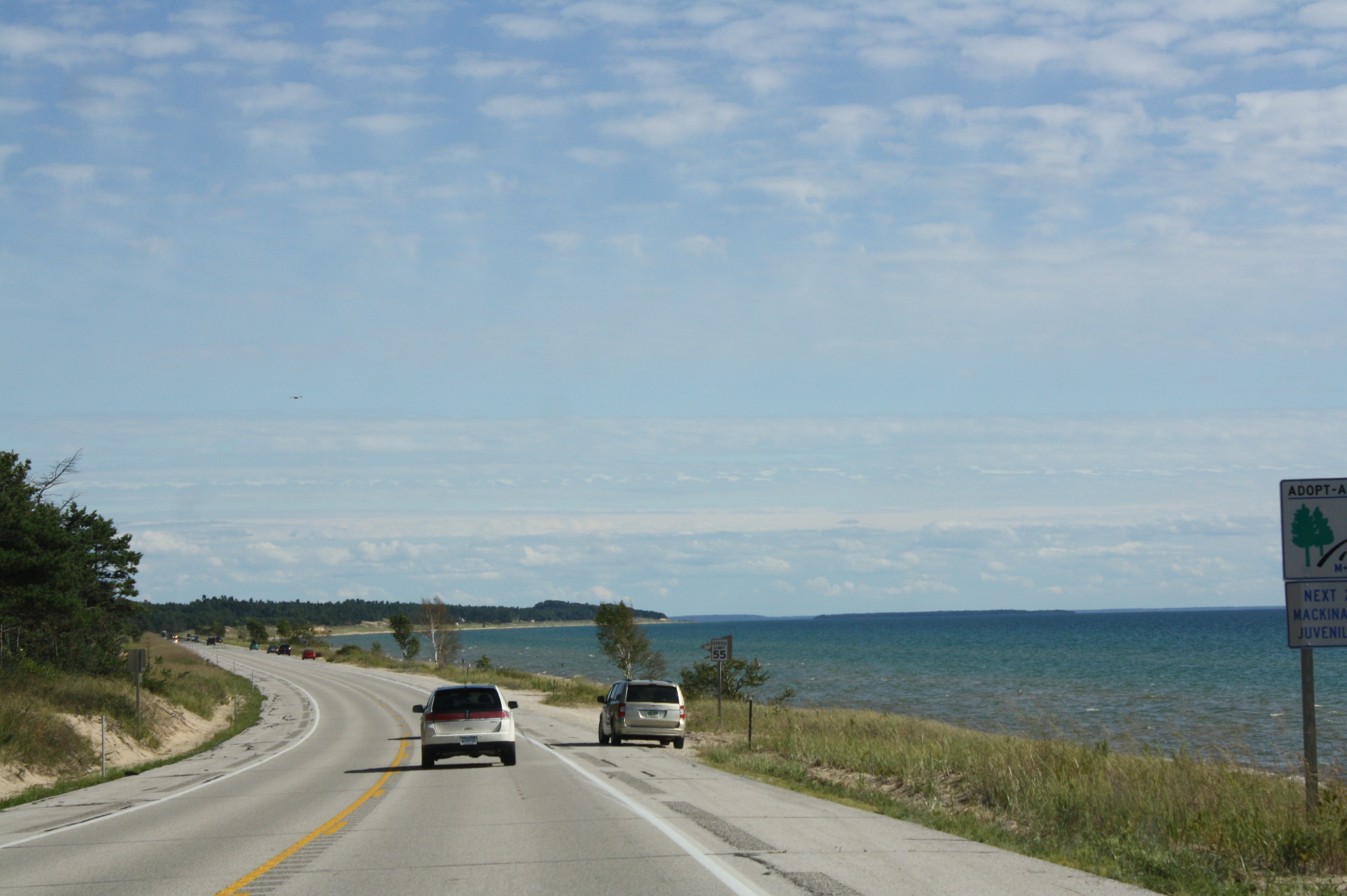
US 2 along Lake Michigan, the Top of the Lake Scenic Byway

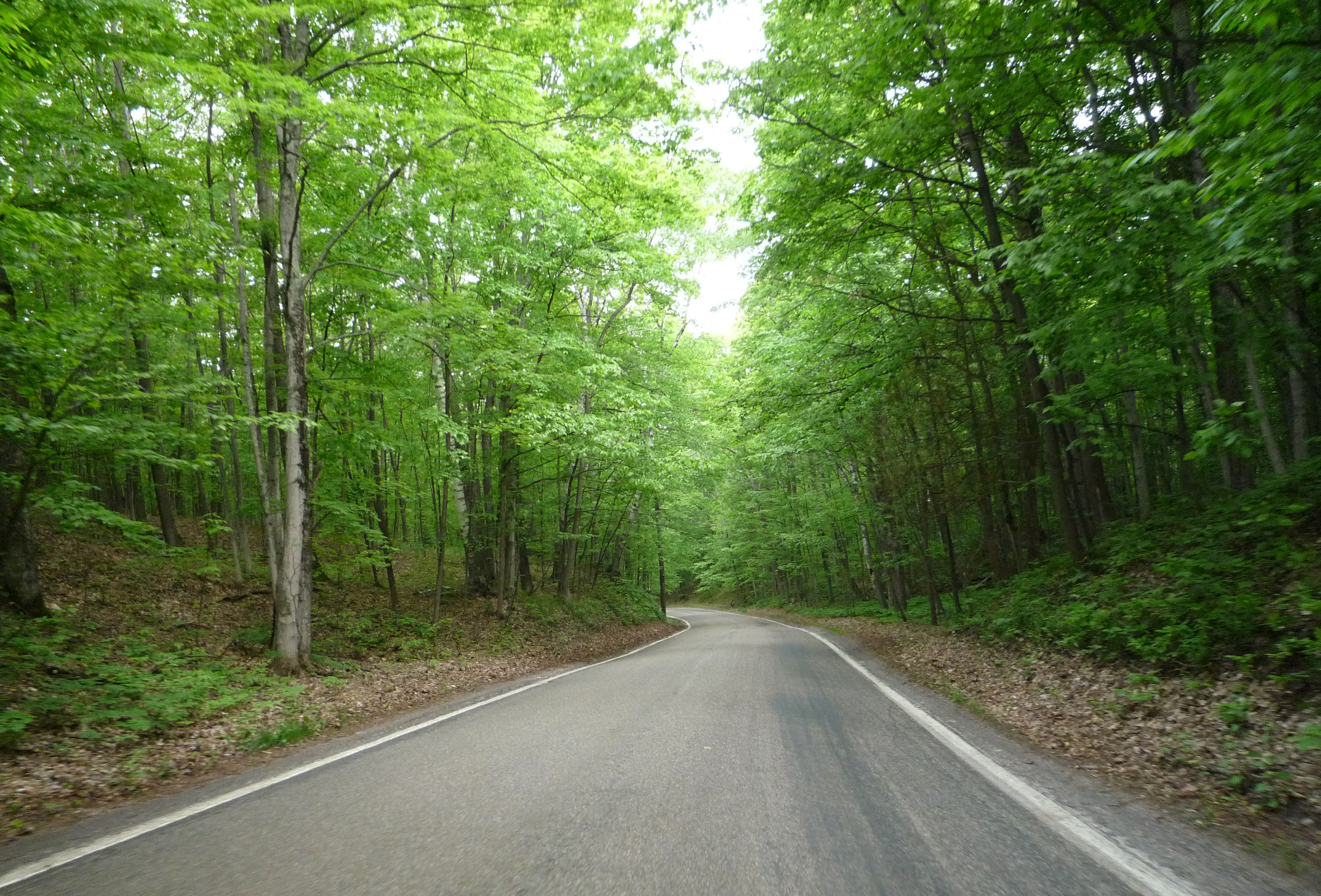
M-119's Tunnel of Trees without a centerline

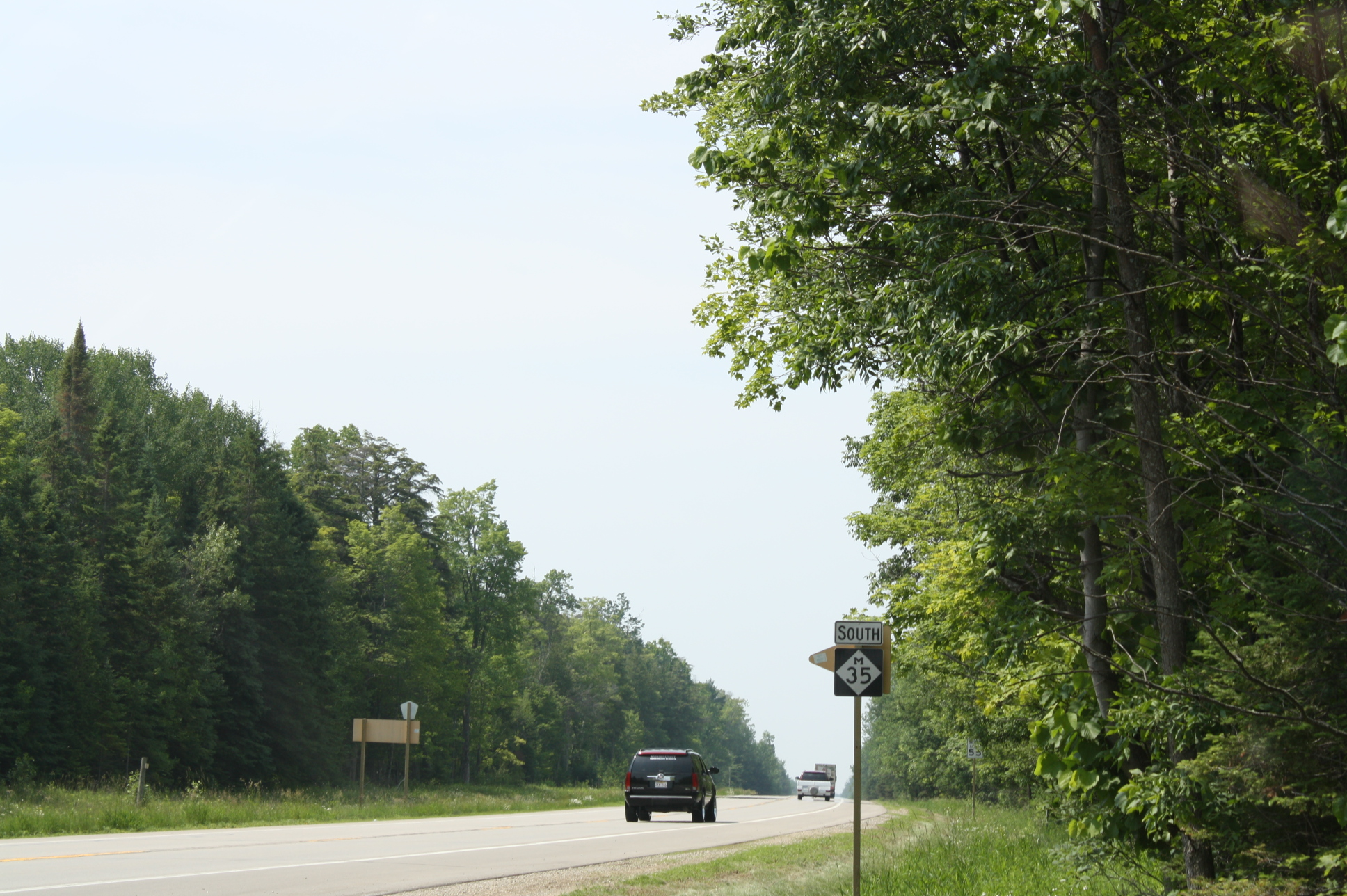
M-35 in Menominee County, dubbed the UP's Hidden Coast

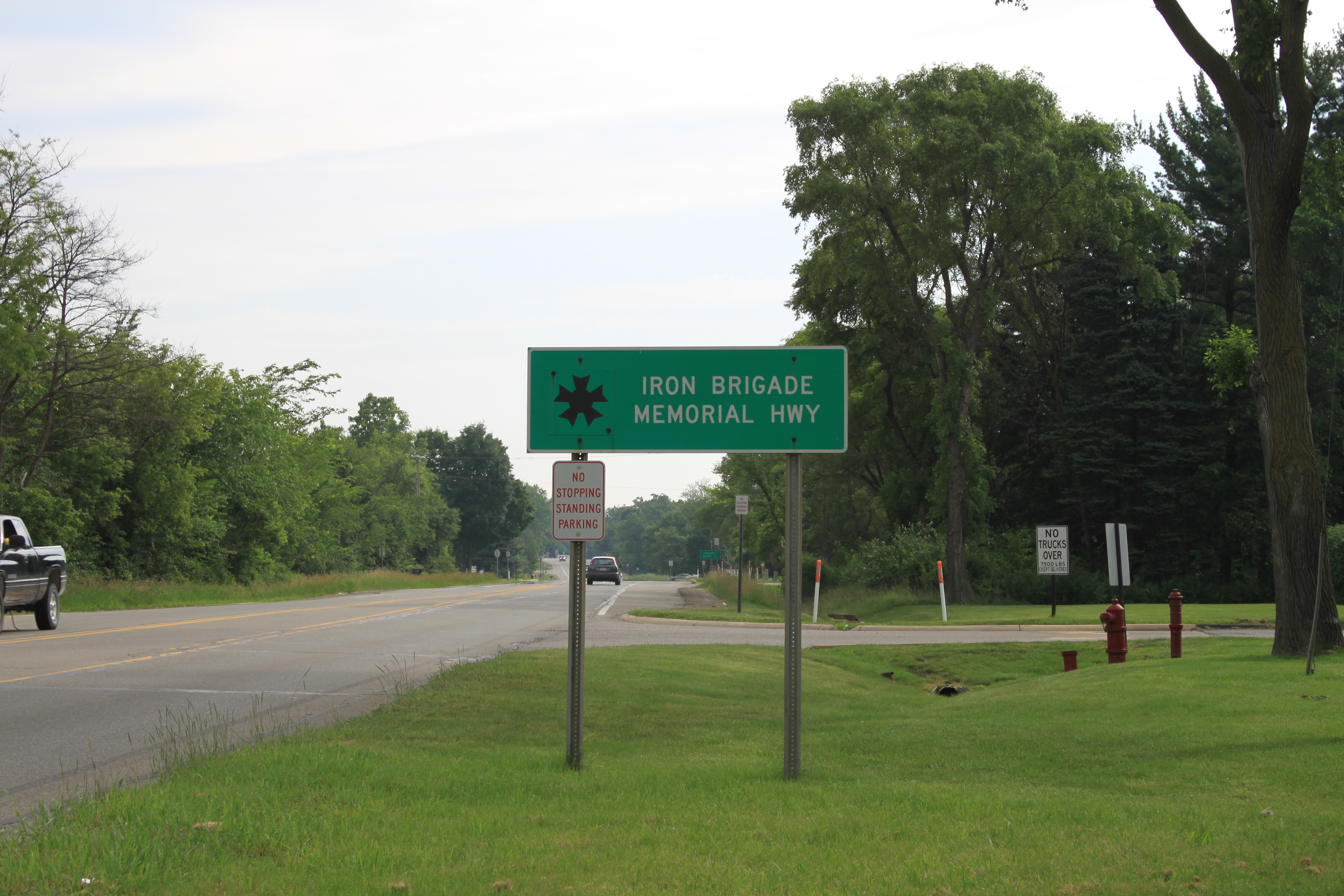
US 12 in Pittsfield Township

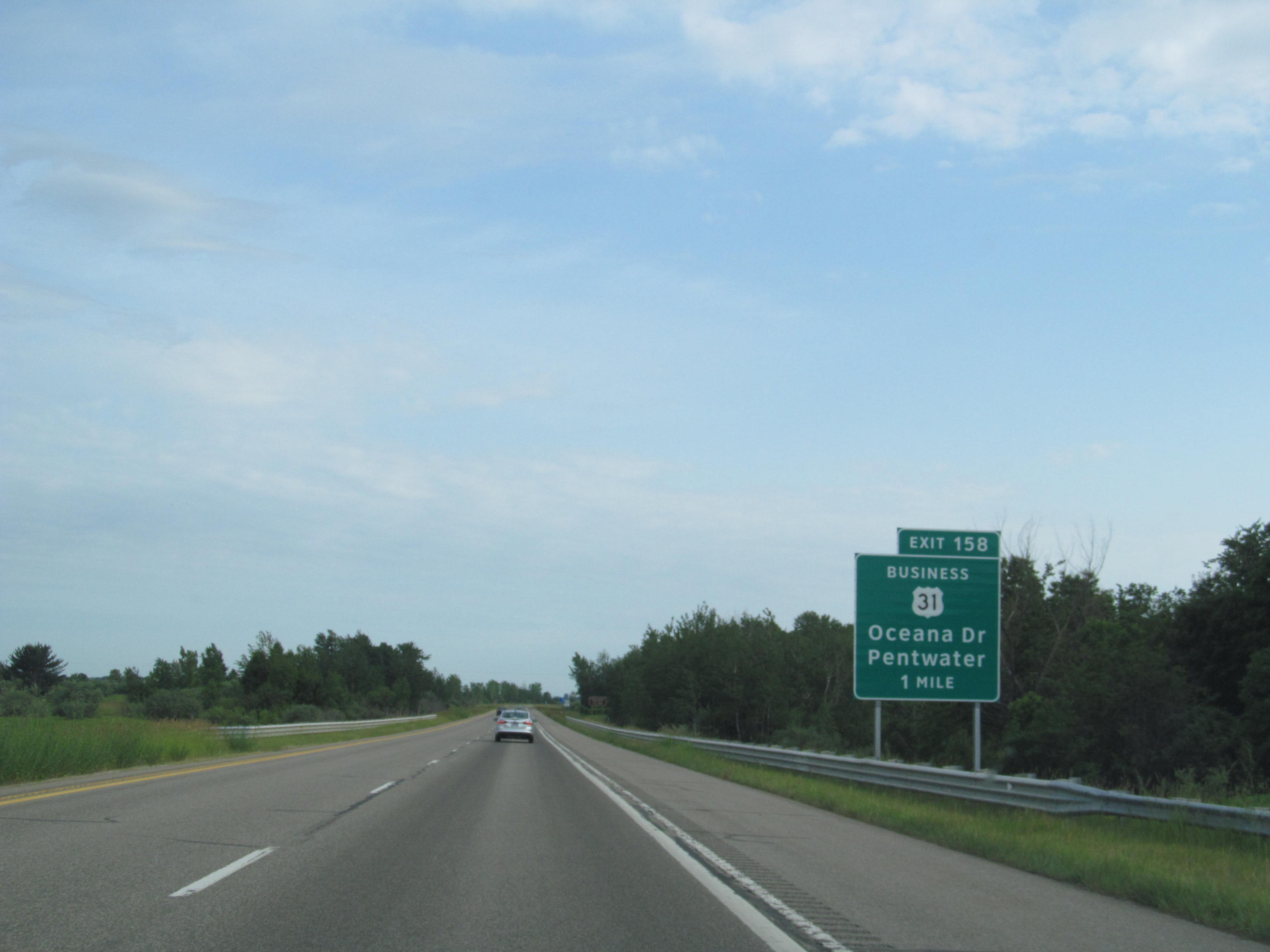
US 31 in Oceana County

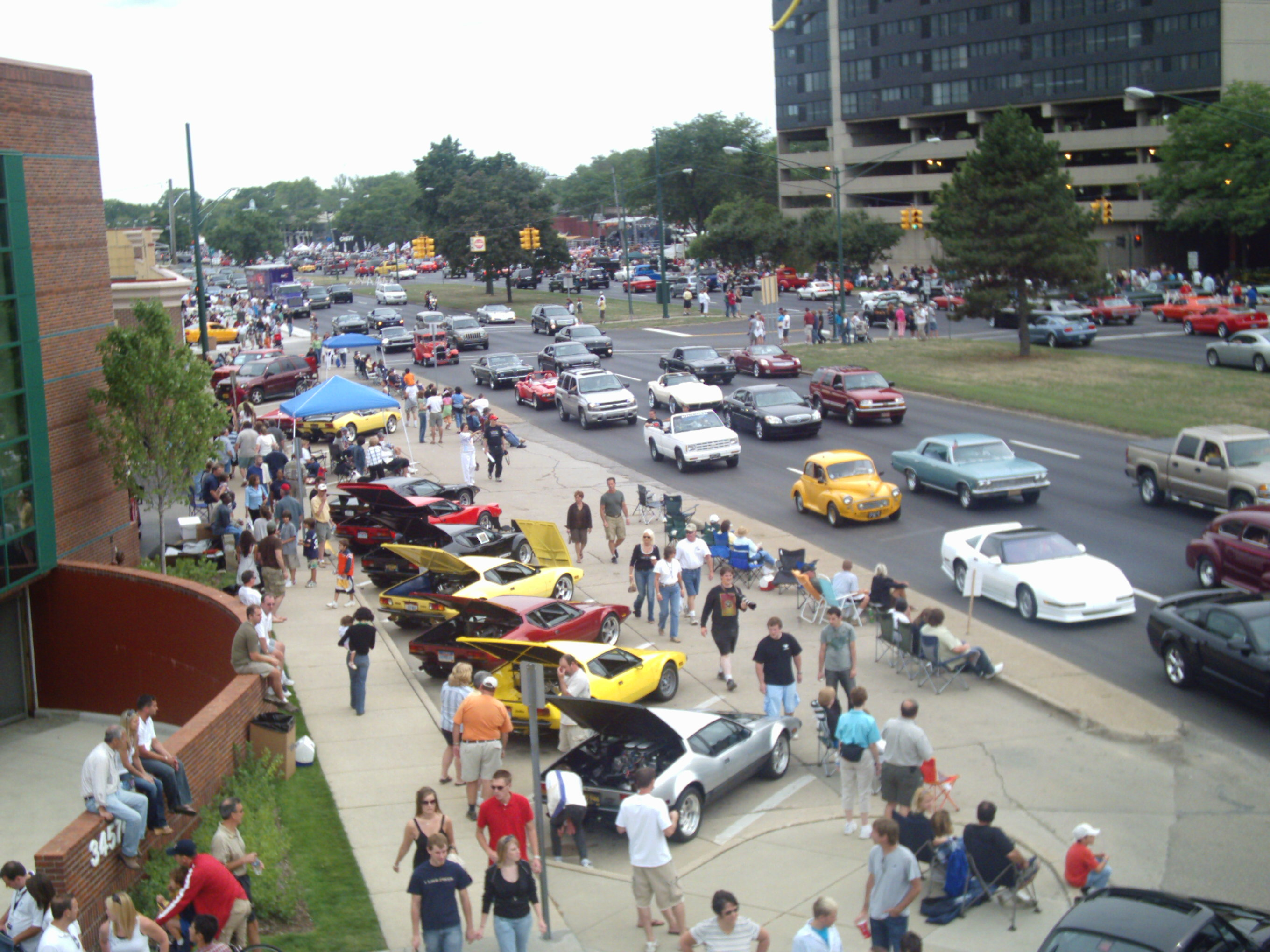
Woodward Avenue during the Woodward Dream Cruise in 2007

== See also ==
Michigan has three National Forest Scenic Byways that run along county roads and a National Park Service-maintained scenic drive, which are ineligible to be Pure Michigan Byways:

- Black River National Forest Scenic Byway
- River Road National Forest Scenic Byway (also a National Scenic Byway)
- Whitefish Bay National Forest Scenic Byway
- Pierce Stocking Scenic Drive
