= Leelanau Scenic Heritage Route =

The Leelanau Scenic Heritage Route is a Pure Michigan Byway on the Leelanau Peninsula in Leelanau County in the US state of Michigan that follows three different highways:

- M-22 around the shoreline of the peninsula between the Benzie–Leelanau county line south of Empire and Traverse City;
- M-109 through the Sleeping Bear Dunes National Lakeshore; and
- M-204 between M-22 at Leland and Suttons Bay.
