= Weare Township, Michigan =

- Township
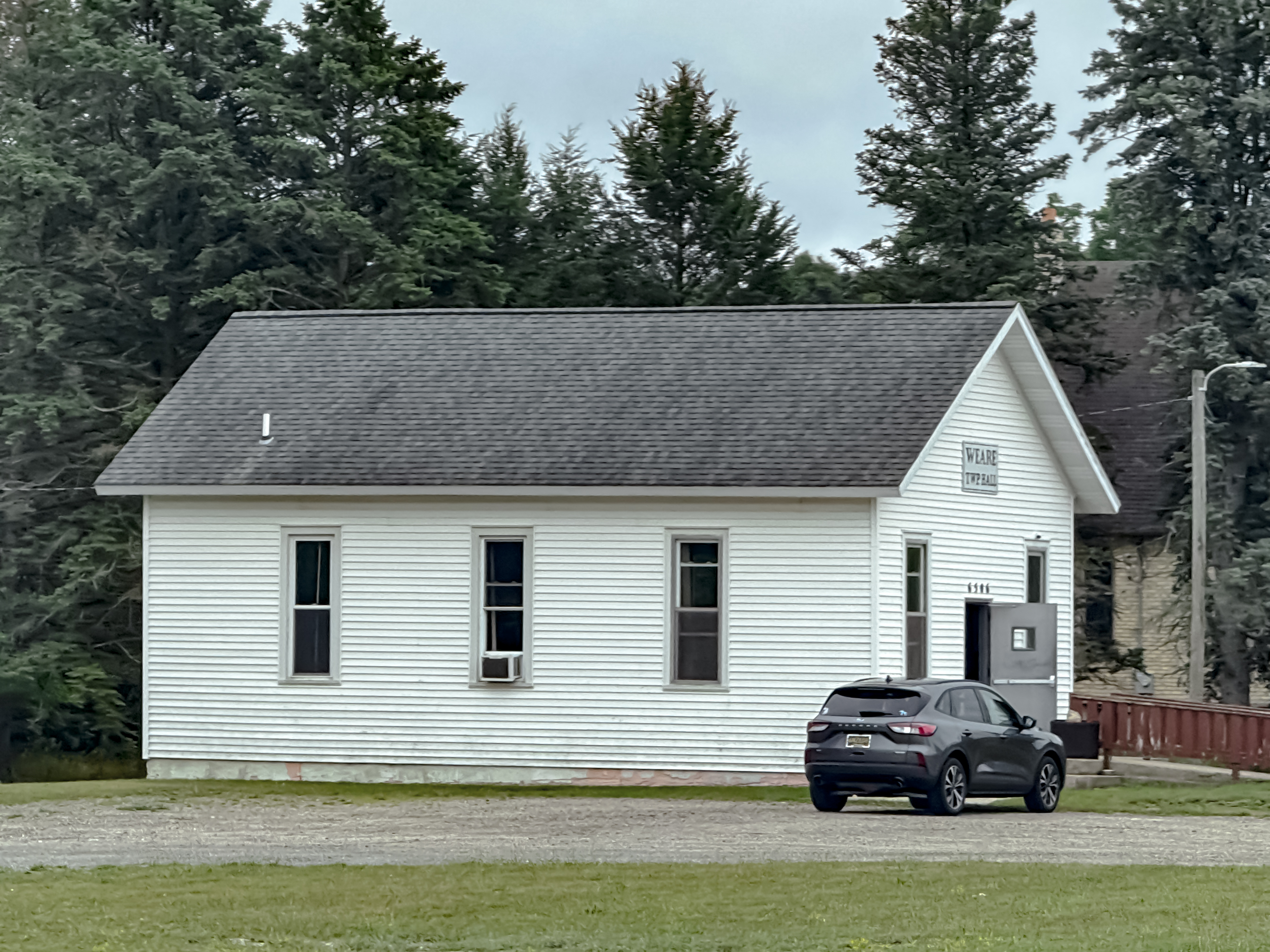
- Township hall

- Location within the state of Michigan Weare Township, Michigan (the United States)
- Coordinates: 43°46′20″N 86°20′28″W
- Country: United States
- State: Michigan
- County: Oceana

Area
  - Total: 36.1 sq mi (93.4 km^{2})
  - Land: 36.1 sq mi (93.4 km^{2})
  - Water: 0 sq mi (0.0 km^{2})
- Elevation: 653 ft (199 m)

Population (2020)
  - Total: 1,224
  - Density: 33.9/sq mi (13.1/km^{2})
- Time zone: UTC-5 (Eastern (EST))
  - Summer (DST): UTC-4 (EDT)
- FIPS code: 26-85040
- GNIS feature ID: 1627235
- Website: https://wearetownship.org/

Weare Township is a civil township of Oceana County in the U.S. state of Michigan. The population was 1,224 at the 2020 census.

== Geography ==
According to the United States Census Bureau, the township has a total area of 36.1 square miles (93 km^{2}), all land.

== Demographics ==
As of the census of 2000, there were 1,261 people, 428 households, and 327 families residing in the township. The population density was 35.0 inhabitants per square mile (13.5/km^{2}). There were 607 housing units at an average density of 16.8 per square mile (6.5/km^{2}). The racial makeup of the township was 92.39% White, 0.24% African American, 0.87% Native American, 0.08% Asian, 4.44% from other races, and 1.98% from two or more races. Hispanic or Latino of any race were 10.55% of the population.

There were 428 households, out of which 40.7% had children under the age of 18 living with them, 63.6% were married couples living together, 9.1% had a female householder with no husband present, and 23.4% were non-families. 20.1% of all households were made up of individuals, and 7.0% had someone living alone who was 65 years of age or older. The average household size was 2.79 and the average family size was 3.21.

In the township the population was spread out, with 31.6% under the age of 18, 6.8% from 18 to 24, 28.7% from 25 to 44, 19.3% from 45 to 64, and 13.6% who were 65 years of age or older. The median age was 35 years. For every 100 females, there were 107.4 males. For every 100 females age 18 and over, there were 103.1 males.

The median income for a household in the township was $37,283, and the median income for a family was $41,131. Males had a median income of $29,821 versus $22,500 for females. The per capita income for the township was $14,106. About 10.4% of families and 13.3% of the population were below the poverty line, including 13.3% of those under age 18 and 16.9% of those age 65 or over.
