= Pere Marquette Charter Township, Michigan =

Pere Marquette Township, Michigan
- Charter township
- Charter Township of Pere Marquette
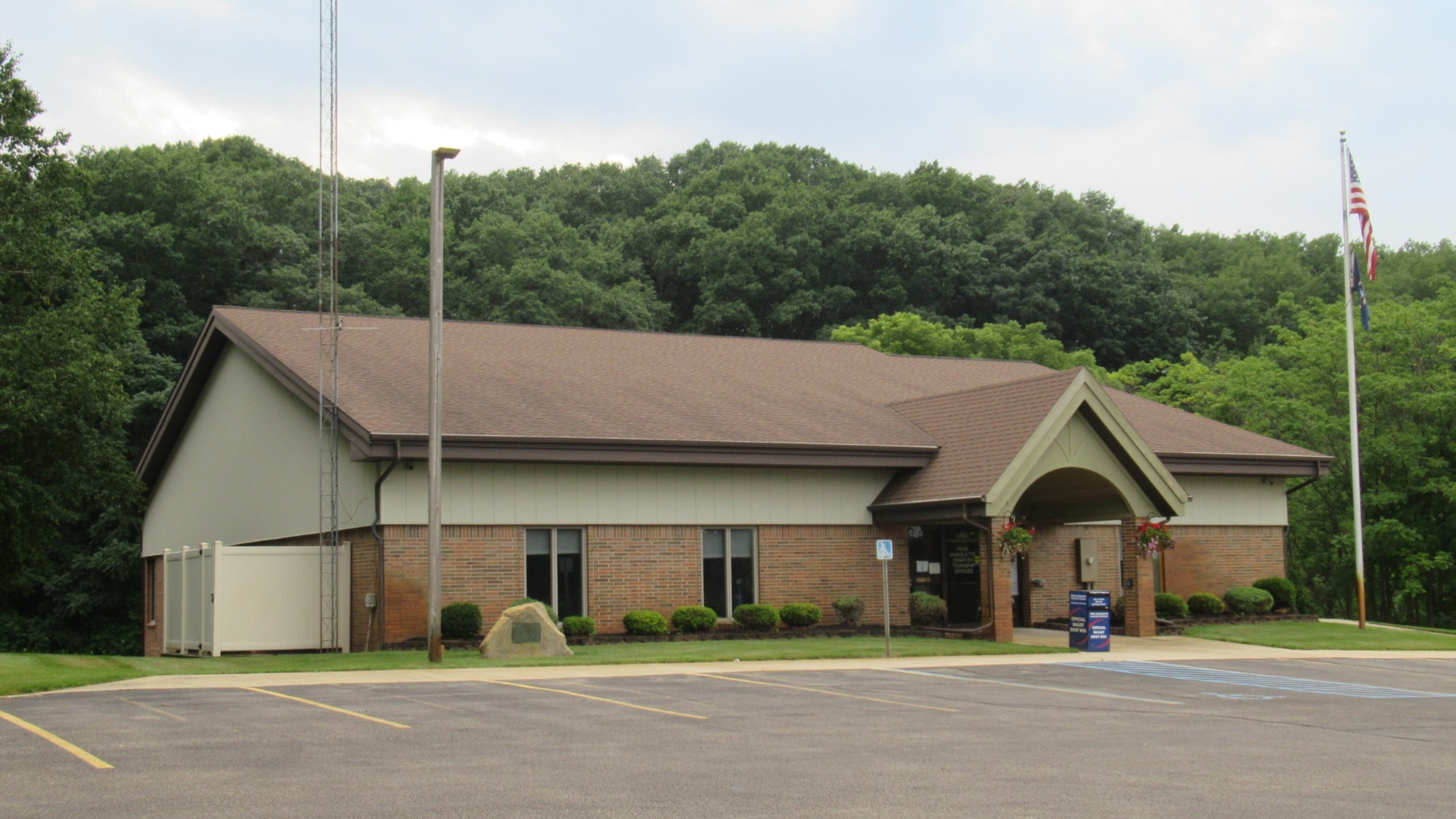
- Pere Marquette Charter Township Offices

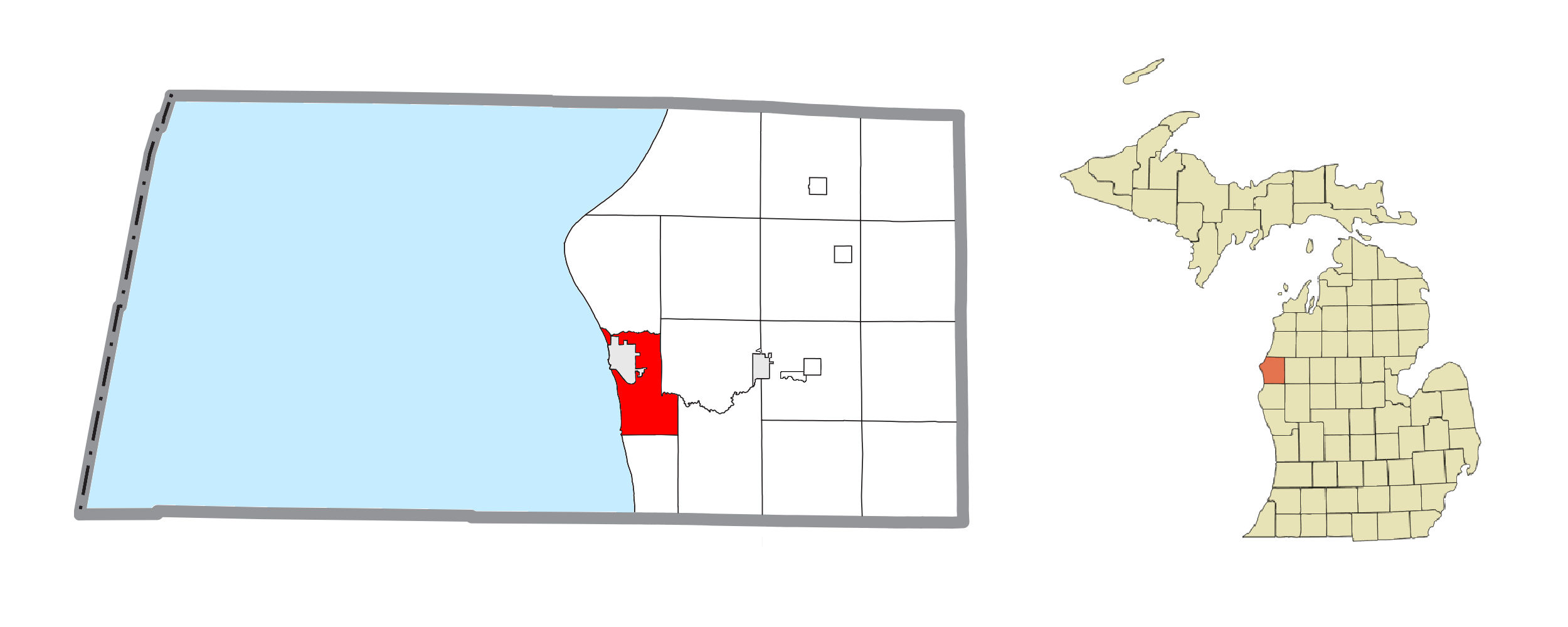
- Location within Mason County

- Location within the state of Michigan Location within the United States
- Coordinates: 43°56′41″N 86°25′39″W
- Country: United States
- State: Michigan
- County: Mason
- Established: 1855

Government
  - Supervisor: Kelly Smith
  - Clerk: Rachelle Enbody

Area
  - Total: 15.85 sq mi (41.1 km^{2})
  - Land: 14.09 sq mi (36.5 km^{2})
  - Water: 1.75 sq mi (4.5 km^{2})
- Elevation: 584 ft (178 m)

Population (2020)
  - Total: 2,416
  - Density: 171.4/sq mi (66.2/km^{2})
- Time zone: UTC-5 (Eastern (EST))
  - Summer (DST): UTC-4 (EDT)
- ZIP code(s): 49431 (Ludington)
- Area code: 231
- FIPS code: 26-105-63600
- GNIS feature ID: 1626894
- Website: Official website

Pere Marquette Charter Township is a charter township of Mason County in the U.S. state of Michigan. The population was 2,416 at the 2020 census.

The township was named for French explorer Père Jacques Marquette. The township surrounds the city of Ludington on Lake Michigan, but the city and the township are administered autonomously.

== Geography ==
According to the United States Census Bureau, the township has a total area of 15.85 square miles (41.05 km^{2}), of which 14.09 square miles (36.49 km^{2}) are land and 1.75 square miles (4.53 km^{2}), or 11.06%, are water. Pere Marquette Lake, an inlet of Lake Michigan that is fed by the Pere Marquette River, is in the center of the township. The city of Ludington borders the northeast part of the township.

== Demographics ==
As of the census of 2000, there were 2,228 people, 858 households, and 665 families residing in the township. The population density was 158.0 inhabitants per square mile (61.0/km^{2}). There were 1,403 housing units at an average density of 99.5 per square mile (38.4/km^{2}). The racial makeup of the township was 96.81% White, 0.13% African American, 0.31% Native American, 0.81% Asian, 0.09% Pacific Islander, 0.18% from other races, and 1.66% from two or more races. Hispanic or Latino of any race were 2.24% of the population.

There were 858 households, out of which 31.8% had children under the age of 18 living with them, 66.6% were married couples living together, 7.2% had a female householder with no husband present, and 22.4% were non-families. 19.0% of all households were made up of individuals, and 9.3% had someone living alone who was 65 years of age or older. The average household size was 2.60 and the average family size was 2.96.

In the township the population was spread out, with 25.7% under the age of 18, 5.8% from 18 to 24, 23.9% from 25 to 44, 28.7% from 45 to 64, and 15.9% who were 65 years of age or older. The median age was 42 years. For every 100 females, there were 102.7 males. For every 100 females age 18 and over, there were 100.2 males.

The median income for a household in the township was $44,432, and the median income for a family was $51,078. Males had a median income of $43,125 versus $23,594 for females. The per capita income for the township was $21,160. About 2.7% of families and 4.5% of the population were below the poverty line, including 5.0% of those under age 18 and 4.4% of those age 65 or over.

== See also ==
- Burr Caswell
