= South Haven Charter Township, Michigan =

- Charter township
- Location within the state of Michigan
- Coordinates: 42°22′24″N 86°15′57″W
- Country: United States
- State: Michigan
- County: Van Buren

Area
  - Total: 17.5 sq mi (45.4 km^{2})
  - Land: 17.5 sq mi (45.4 km^{2})
  - Water: 0 sq mi (0.0 km^{2})
- Elevation: 640 ft (195 m)

Population (2020)
  - Total: 4,041
  - Density: 231/sq mi (89.0/km^{2})
- Time zone: UTC-5 (Eastern (EST))
  - Summer (DST): UTC-4 (EDT)
- ZIP code: 49090
- Area code: 269
- FIPS code: 26-75000
- GNIS feature ID: 1627099
- Website: https://southhaventwp.com/

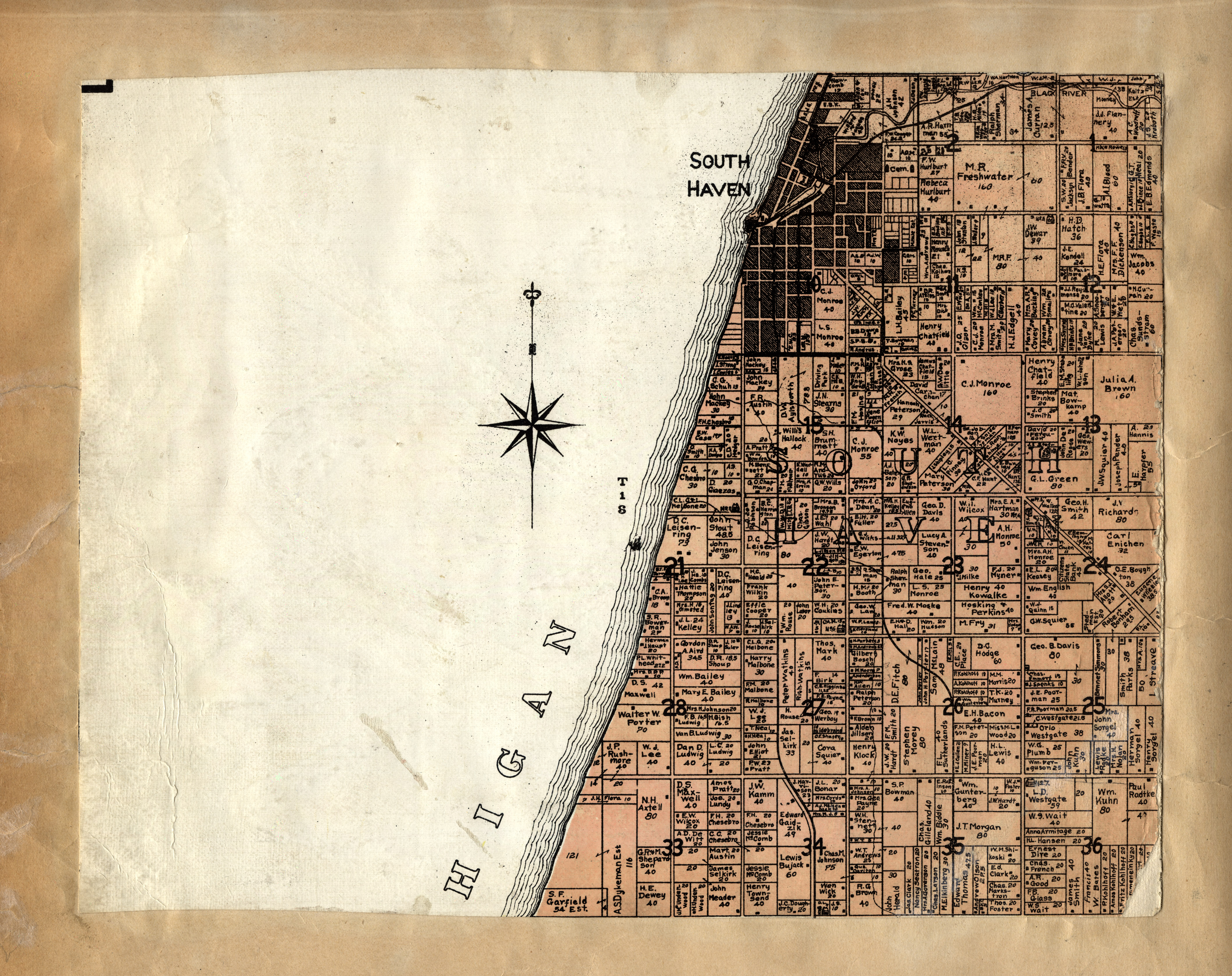
A 1906 cadastral map of South Haven Township, showing property lines and names of rural landowners

South Haven Charter Township is a charter township of Van Buren County in the U.S. state of Michigan. The population was 4,041 at the 2020 census. The city of South Haven is located to the northwest of the township.

The city of South Haven has annexed portions of land that was once within the township boundaries, but is administratively autonomous. There are no other incorporated municipalities within the township. The area south of South Haven is considered to be a part of the city's urban area. Other settlements are in the unincorporated communities:

- Maple Grove Corners is at 42°22′32″N 86°14′38″W. The elevation is 682 feet above sea level.
- Crystal Beach is a development area on the shores of Lake Michigan several miles south of South Haven and just north of Van Buren State Park. It is at 42°21′24″N 86°17′53″W. The FIPS place code is 19130.

== Geography ==
The northern portion of the township is drained by the Black River, which has its mouth at South Haven. The southern portion is drained by Deerlick Creek and other unnamed creeks.

Interstate 196/U.S. Highway 31 (I-196/US 31) runs mostly north–south through the township, roughly parallel with the Lake Michigan shore and skirting the east side of South Haven. M-140 runs due north–south through the township into South Haven. M-43 runs southeast–northwest through Maple Grove Corners into South Haven.

According to the United States Census Bureau, the township has a total area of 17.5 square miles (45 km^{2}), all land.

== Demographics ==
As of the census of 2000, there were 4,046 people, 1,645 households, and 1,092 families residing in the township. The population density was 230.7 inhabitants per square mile (89.1/km^{2}). There were 1,890 housing units at an average density of 107.8 units per square mile (41.6 units/km^{2}). The racial makeup of the township was 82.11% White, 12.61% African American, 0.72% Native American, 0.42% Asian, 1.93% from other races, and 2.22% from two or more races. Hispanic or Latino of any race were 5.34% of the population.

There were 1,645 households, out of which 31.4% had children under the age of 18 living with them, 48.8% were married couples living together, 13.4% had a female householder with no husband present, and 33.6% were non-families. 28.9% of all households were made up of individuals, and 11.8% had someone living alone who was 65 years of age or older. The average household size was 2.43 and the average family size was 2.97.

In the township the population was spread out, with 27.2% under the age of 18, 7.5% from 18 to 24, 26.9% from 25 to 44, 24.1% from 45 to 64, and 14.3% who were 65 years of age or older. The median age was 38 years. For every 100 females, there were 92.5 males. For every 100 females age 18 and over, there were 86.9 males.

The median income for a household in the township was $35,000, and the median income for a family was $38,922. Males had a median income of $31,754 versus $22,363 for females. The per capita income for the township was $17,097. About 9.1% of families and 11.8% of the population were below the poverty line, including 18.0% of those under age 18 and 10.2% of those age 65 or over.
