= List of Michigan State Historic Sites in Allegan County =

Location of Allegan County in Michigan

The following is a list of Michigan State Historic Sites in Allegan County, Michigan. Sites marked with a dagger (†) are also listed on the National Register of Historic Places in Allegan County, Michigan.

== Current listings ==
Name	Image	Location	City	Listing date
All Saints Episcopal Church†		252 Grand Street, southwest corner of Hoffman Street	Saugatuck	April 24, 1981
Allegan County Informational Designation		125 Chestnut St	Allegan	November 14, 1961
Allegan Road Commemorative Designation		River Bluff Park Old Allegan Road	Saugatuck	February 17, 1994
Castle Park Lodge		6700 Bryant Avenue, Castle Park	Holland	September 10, 1979
Church of the Good Shepherd		101 Walnut Street	Allegan	July 26, 1973
Clipson Brewery Ice House (Twin Gables Hotel)		900 Lake Street	Saugatuck	April 28, 1987
John Crispe House		404 East Bridge Street	Plainwell	April 25, 1988
Delano House		302 Cutler Street	Allegan	July 26, 1973
Douglas Union School†		130 Center Street	Douglas	December 20, 1990
Dutcher Lodge		86 Center Street	Douglas	January 13, 1985
Ebenezer Reformed Church Informational Designation		5166 Ottogan St.	Holland	February 27, 1970
Dorr E. Felt Mansion†		6597 138th Ave.	Holland	January 17, 2006
Fifty-Seventh Street Bridge†		57th Street over the Kalamazoo River	New Richmond	April 4, 1978
First Congregational Church		296 Hoffman	Saugatuck	March 21, 1991
Francis Metallic Surfboat†		130 W. Center St.	Douglas	January 17, 2016
Ganges Fractional District No. 1 School House		6292 124th Avenue	Fennville	July 26, 1978
Dr. Asa Goodrich House		112 Center Street	Douglas	December 5, 1986
Graafschap Christian Reformed Church		A-621 (48th Avenue) between Graafschap Road and Washington Avenue	Holland	December 14, 1976
Hacklander Site (20AE78)†		130th Ave & 63rd ST	Saugatuck Township	April 14, 1972
Henika Ladies' Library		149 South Main Street	Wayland	November 26, 1985
John Butler Johnson House The Porches		2207 70th Street	Fennville	February 25, 1988 Demolished 2012
Harvey Judson Kingsley House		626 West Main Street	Fennville	May 21, 1992
Sarah M. Kirby House		294 West Center Street	Douglas	November 20, 1987
Laketown Township Hall		A-6280 142nd Avenue	Holland	January 19, 1989
Hollister F. Marsh Jr. House		107 Delano Street	Allegan	June 23, 1983
Horace D. Moore House		888 Holland Street	Saugatuck	June 15, 1984
Michigan Paper Company Mill Historic District†		200 Allegan St.	Plainwell	June 15, 2015
Old Wing Mission†		5298 40th Ave.	Holland	December 8, 1967
Oakland Christian Reformed Church	Oakland Christian Reformed Church	4452 38th St.	Hamilton	June 13, 1986
Otsego Methodist Church	Otsego Methodist Church	223 E. Allegan	Otsego	January 17, 2002
Overisel Reformed Church(demolished)		A-4706 142nd Avenue	Overisel Township	June 30, 1988
Village of Pier Cove Informational Designation		2290 Lakeshore Dr.	Fennville	February 16, 1989
General Benjamin Pritchard House		330 Davis Street	Allegan	February 11, 1972
Reed's Livery	Reed's Livery	248 Culver St.	Saugatuck	July 19, 1990
Schriver's Inn (currently used as the Ox-Bow School of Art)		3435 Rupprecht Way	Saugatuck	August 3, 1979
Saugatuck Pump House†		735 Park St.	Saugatuck	October 4, 2016
Second Street Bridge†		2nd St.	Allegan	January 17, 1982
Seventh Day Adventist Church		229 Cutler Street	Allegan	July 26, 1973
Singapore Informational Designation		102 Butler	Saugatuck	April 16, 1958
Warner P. Sutton House†		736 Pleasant Street	Saugatuck	May 15, 1987
Fred Thompson House (William Springer House)		633 Pleasant	Saugatuck	June 30, 1988
Orson G. Vahue House		203 Cutler Street	Allegan	August 12, 1983

== See also ==
- National Register of Historic Places listings in Allegan County, Michigan

== Sources ==
- Historic Sites Online – Allegan County. Michigan State Housing Developmental Authority. Accessed January 23, 2011.
