= Saugatuck Public Schools =

School district in Michigan

Address
- 401 Elizabeth St. Saugatuck, Allegan County, Michigan, 49453; United States

District information
- Grades: PreKindergarten–12
- Superintendent: Mark Neidlinger
- Schools: 2
- Budget: $25,541,000 2022-2023 expenditures
- NCES District ID: 2630960

Students and staff
- Students: 819 (2024-2025)
- Teachers: 53.32 (on an FTE basis) (2024-2025)
- Staff: 100.46 FTE (2024-2025)
- Student–teacher ratio: 15.36 (2024-2025)

Other information
- Website: saugatuckpublicschools.com

Saugatuck Public Schools is a public school district in Allegan County, in West Michigan. It serves Saugatuck, Douglas, and parts of the townships of Laketown and Saugatuck.

== History ==
One of the oldest schools within the district's current boundaries is still extant. The Douglas Union School at 130 Center Street in Douglas was built in 1866. It contained a high school until the 1920s, when Douglas' high school students started attending Saugatuck High School. Douglas Union School was closed and sold in 1957, when the current Douglas Elementary opened. As a well-preserved example of a multi-classroom union school, it was added to the National Register of Historic Places in 1995.

Saugatuck had a similar Union School, at the corner of Elizabeth and Allegan Streets, and Saugatuck High School was established within it around 1887. It burned down in 1896.

Douglas and Saugatuck school districts merged in 1963. In fall 1974, the current Saugatuck Middle/High School opened and the previous high school (built in 1927 and expanded in 1951) was torn down. The building's architecture firm was Vander Meiden, Koteles and Associates. A middle school wing and other additions were added to the high school around 2002.

The district considered changing its "Indians" mascot in 2009, but after hosting a community forum about the issue, chose to keep it. In 2020 the issue was reexamined, and that August the school board voted unanimously to change the nickname, in an effort to avoid racist and offensive stereotypes associated with Native American imagery. In August 2021, rebranding of the district was complete, with "Trailblazers" as the new mascot and a new logo featuring a trail heading toward the sun, symbolic of "inspiration and intuition" and "moving forward as one."

Additions and extensive renovations were completed at the district's schools in 2025.

== Schools ==
Schools in Saugatuck Public Schools district
School	Address	Notes
Saugatuck Middle/High School	401 Elizabeth Street, Saugatuck	Grades 6–12; built 1974
Douglas Elementary	261 West Randolph Street, Douglas	Grades PreK–6
