= Saugatuck =

Saugatuck may refer to

== Connecticut, US ==
- Saugatuck, Connecticut, a neighborhood in the town of Westport
- Saugatuck Reservoir
- Saugatuck River
- Saugatuck River Bridge
- Saugatuck River Railroad Bridge

== Michigan, US ==
- Saugatuck, Michigan
- Saugatuck Township, Michigan
- Saugatuck Dunes State Park
- Saugatuck Chain Ferry
