= Francis Metallic Surfboat =

- U.S. National Register of Historic Places
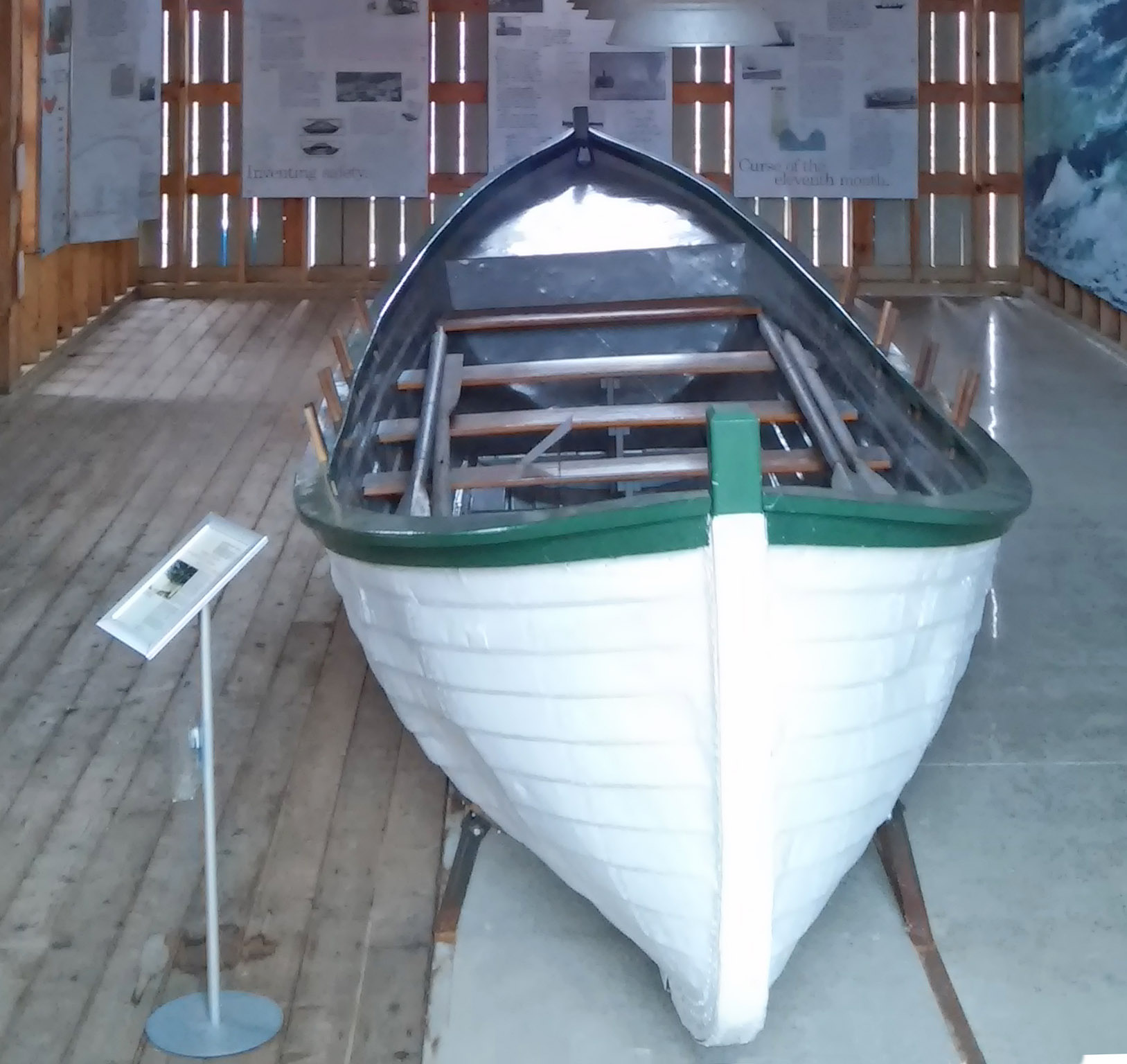

- Location within Michigan Location within the United States
- Interactive map
- Location: 130 W. Center St., Douglas, Michigan
- Coordinates: 42°38′39″N 86°12′12″W
- NRHP reference No.: 15000156
- Added to NRHP: April 21, 2015

The Francis Metallic Surfboat is a boat, currently housed at 130 West Center Street in Douglas, Michigan. It was listed on the National Register of Historic Places in 2015. It is one of two known surviving examples of its kind, one of the first type of coastal rescue craft used.

== History ==
The Francis Metallic Surfboat was designed by Joseph Francis, an inventor who specialized in inventing and constructing maritime lifesaving equipment. Francis constructed 137 of these vessels from about 1849 to 1857, of which 48 were used on the Great Lakes. This particular boat dates from approximately 1854, and was in use from 1854 until at least 1863. It was originally stationed near the mouth of the Kalamazoo River.

The vessel gradually deteriorated until the 1930s, after which its remains were put into storage. In about 2006, volunteers from the Saugatuck-Douglas Historical Society (SDHS) restored the boat. In 2011, the Society constructed a dedicated building in Douglas to display the vessel. The boat remains on display in the building in Douglas.

== Description ==
The Francis Metallic Surfboat is a 26-foot vessel with a six-foot beam. The hull is made of iron. The boat was built using an innovative metal fabricating technique invented by Joseph Francis. The boat is an example of a distinctly American type of rescue craft known as the "pulling" surfboat, which is designed to be pulled through the water by oars, rather than propelled by a sail or motor.
