= Navigation Structures at Saugatuck Harbor =

Navigation structures in Michigan, United States

- U.S. National Register of Historic Places
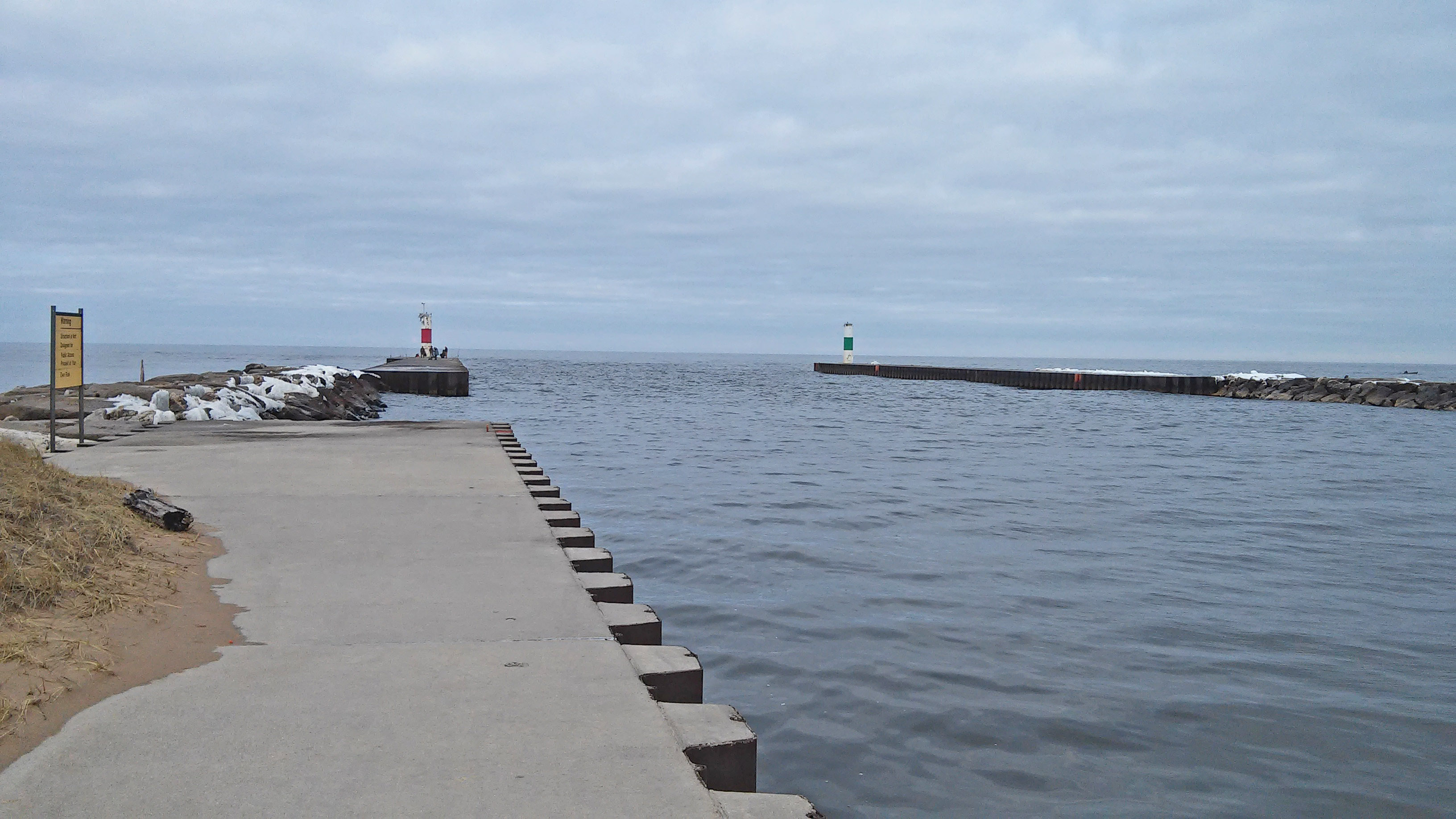

- Location within Michigan Location within the United States
- Interactive map
- Location: Mouth of the Kalamazoo River, Saugatuck Township, Michigan
- Coordinates: 42°40′35″N 86°12′58″W
- Area: 1.7 acres (0.69 ha)
- Built: 1904
- Built by: Burke, Smith & Nelson
- Architectural style: Utilitarian
- NRHP reference No.: 01001216
- Added to NRHP: November 8, 2001

The Navigation Structures at Saugatuck Harbor consist of two piers flanking the mouth of the Kalamazoo River on the shore of Lake Michigan in Saugatuck Township, Michigan. The structures were listed on the National Register of Historic Places in 2001.

== History ==
The nearby city of Saugatuck began its history as a lumber and shipping town, with shipments operating out of the city as early as the 1830s. In 1838, the Federal government erected a lighthouse to serve the port. Some time in the mid-1800s, private parties dredged the Kalamazoo River channel north of the city and constructed two slab piers at the mouth of the river. In 1869, the United States Army Corps of Engineers began work improving the Saugatuck harbor, and by 1883, the piers had been extended to a total length of 1,907 feet on the north and 3,863 feet on the south side. The channel, however, required constant dredging, and would quickly silt up.

In 1896, to solve the maintenance problem, the Corps proposed abandoning the existing river mouth channel and cutting a new channel from the Kalamazoo River to Lake Michigan north of the existing river entrance. The proposed location cut through gravel, and was less prone to silting. In 1903, the firm of Burke, Smith & Nelson was contracted to construct the piers, and in 1904 land was obtained and construction began. Cribs for the piers were constructed in Muskegon and towed to Saugatuck for placement, and the balance of the work was done in place. Construction was completed in 1906 at a total cost of $273,783.23. In 1936-38, repairs were made to the structure and the piers capped with concrete. Further repairs and upgrades were made in 1974 and again in 1981/82.

== Description ==
The Navigation Structures at Saugatuck Harbor consist of two piers, 200 feet apart and parallel, flanking the mouth of the Kalamazoo River. The North Pier is 2,778 feet long and the South Pier is 2,514 feet long. Lights are located on the end of each pier. The extreme outer portions of the piers are stone filled timber cribs, each 24 feet wide and 100 feet long Riprap is placed on both sides of the crib. Inland of the cribs, the remaining pier sections are constructed of wood piling spaced 13 feet apart and filled with stone. The shoreward sections are 13–14 feet wide and built with wood pilings and filled with stone. The piers were capped with concrete in the 1930s.

== Gallery ==
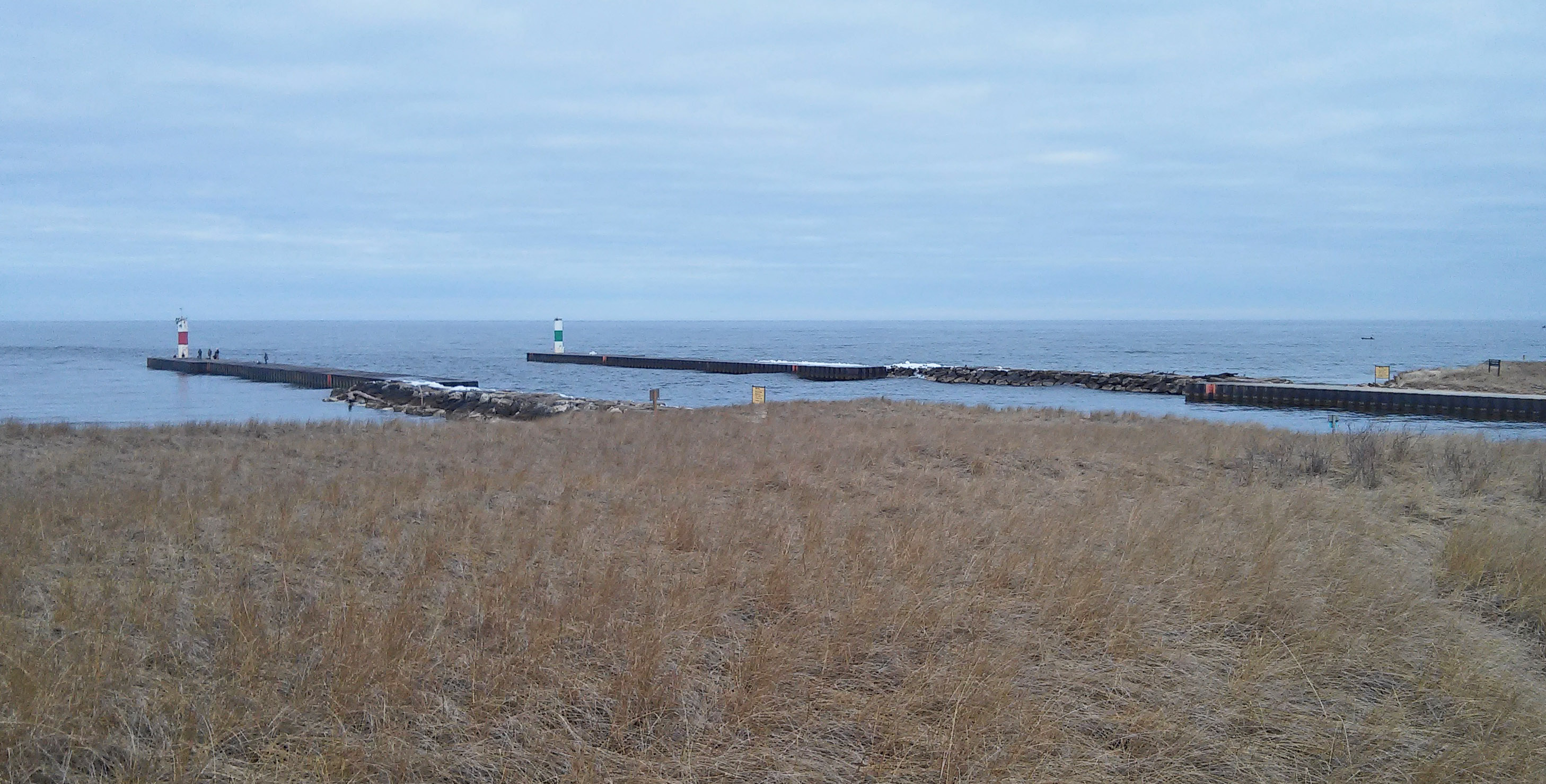
View of structures looking northwest

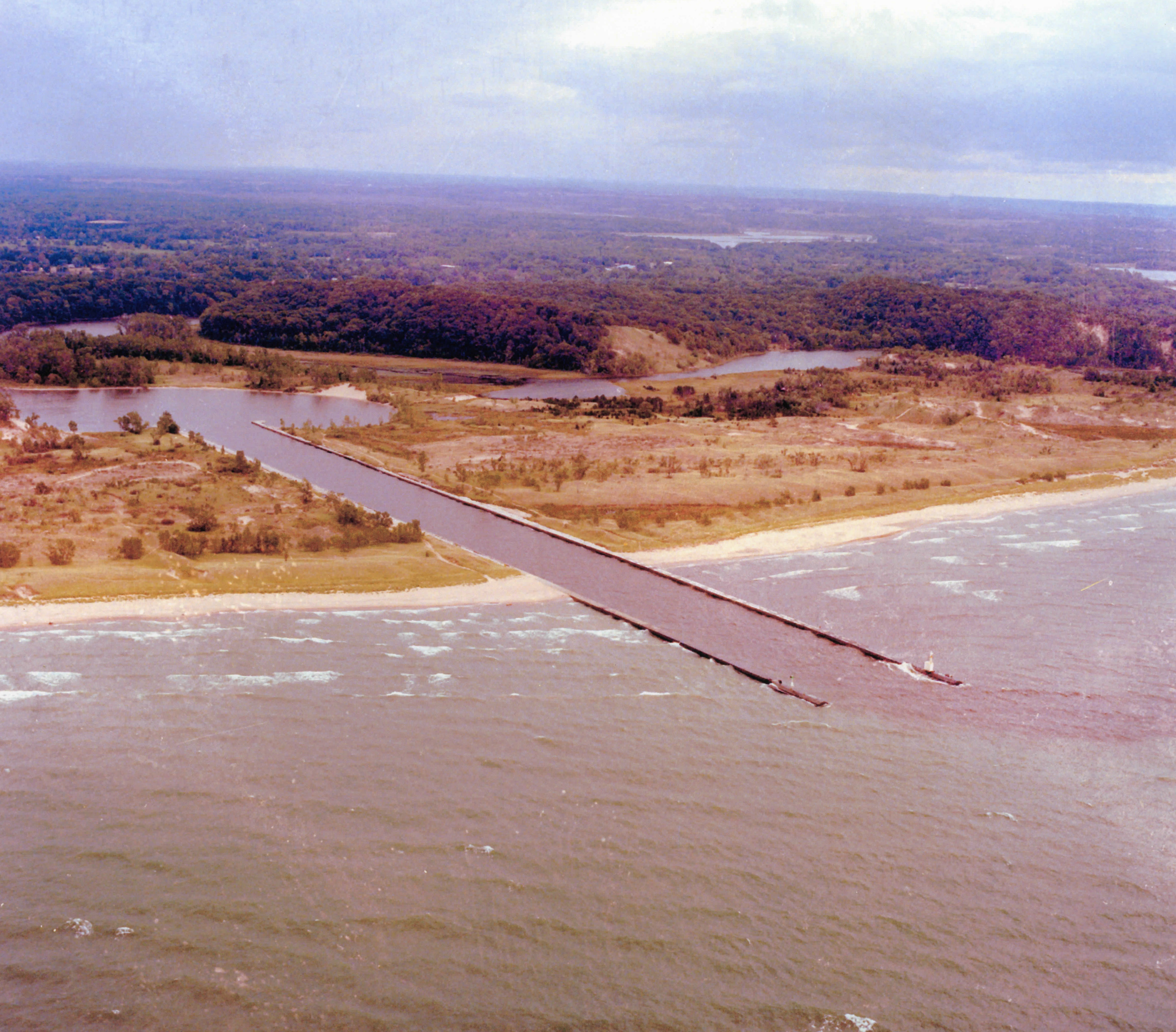
Aerial view looking southeast

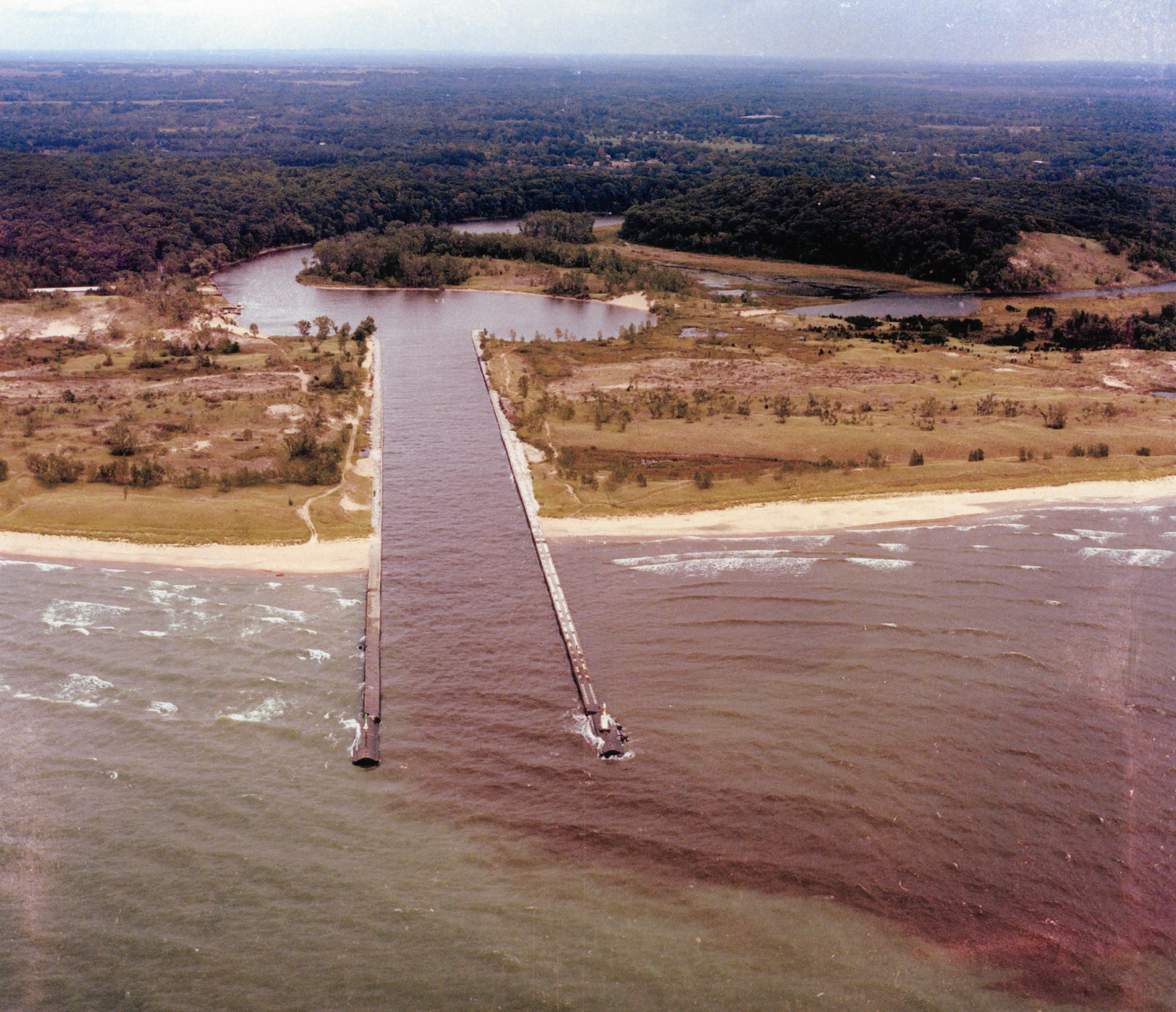
Aerial view looking east

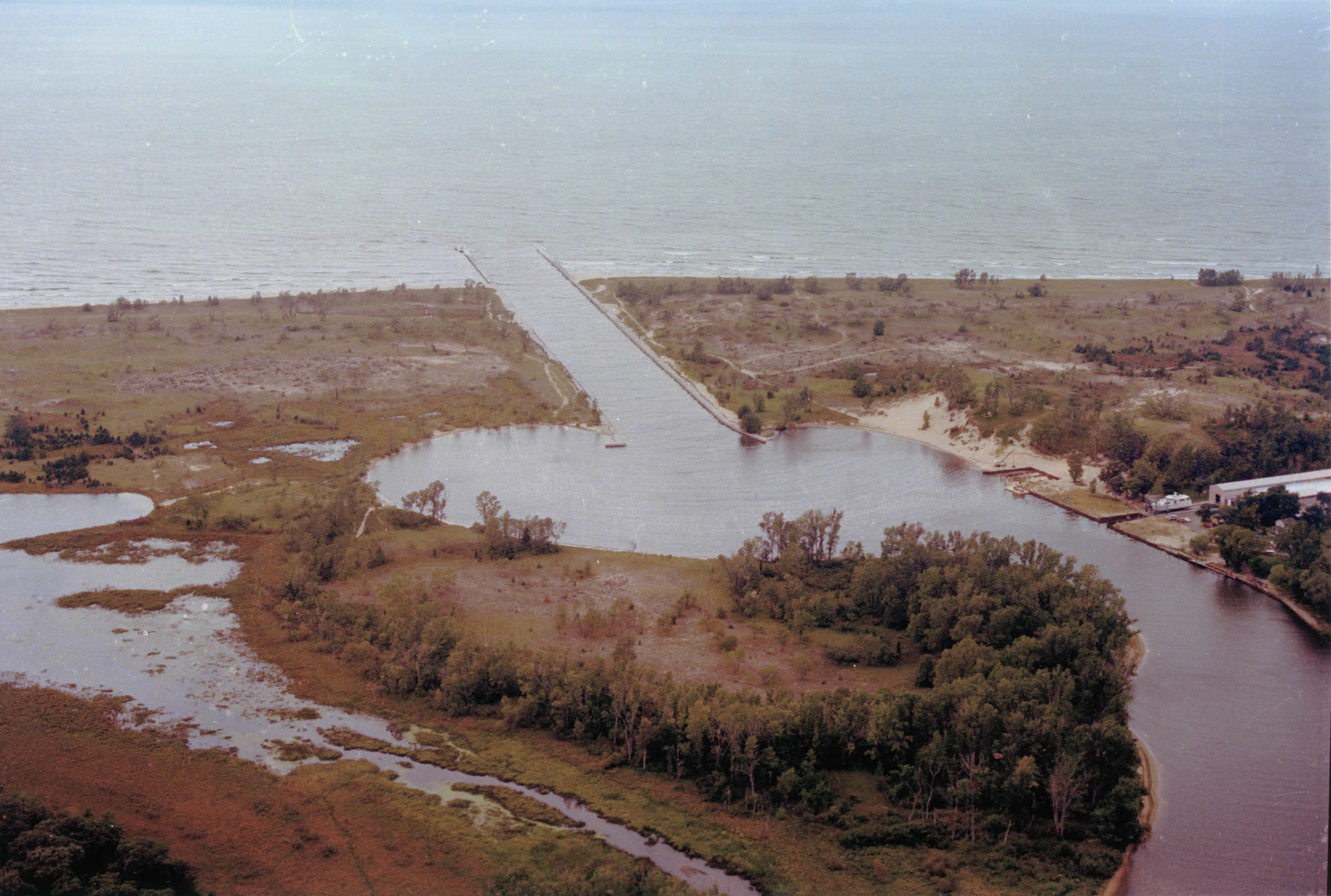
Aerial view looking west
