= Kalamazoo Lake =

- Location within Michigan
- Location: Allegan County, Michigan
- Coordinates: 42°39′02″N 086°12′25″W
- Type: lake

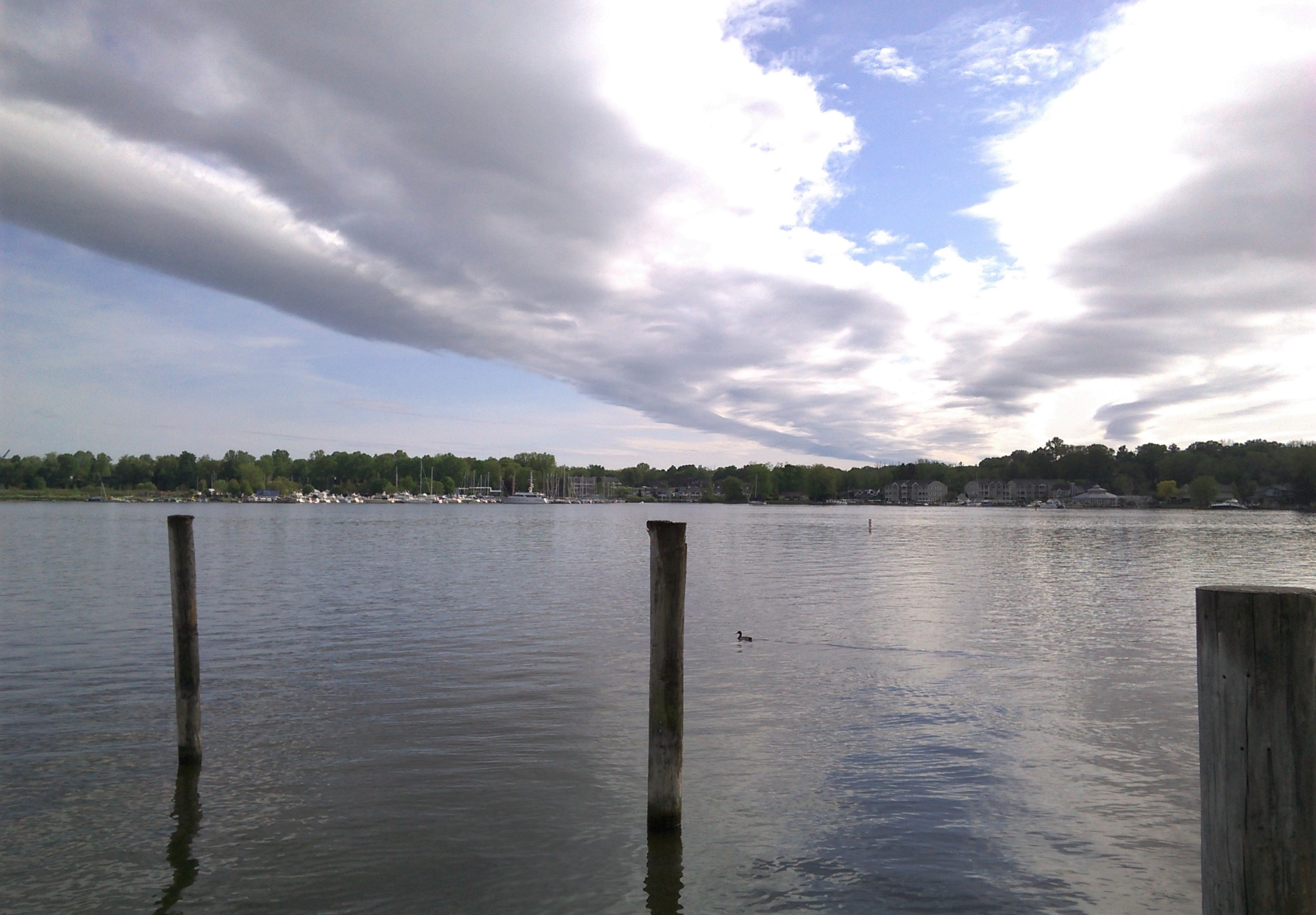
Kalamazoo Lake

Kalamazoo Lake is a lake in Allegan County, Michigan. The Kalamazoo River connects Kalamazoo Lake with Lake Michigan, the river flows northwest through Otsego, Allegan and Saugatuck, into Lake Michigan.

Kalamazoo Lake lies at an elevation of 581 feet (177 m) south of Saugatuck, Michigan.

== See also ==
- Kalamazoo River
