= Second Street Bridge (Allegan, Michigan) =

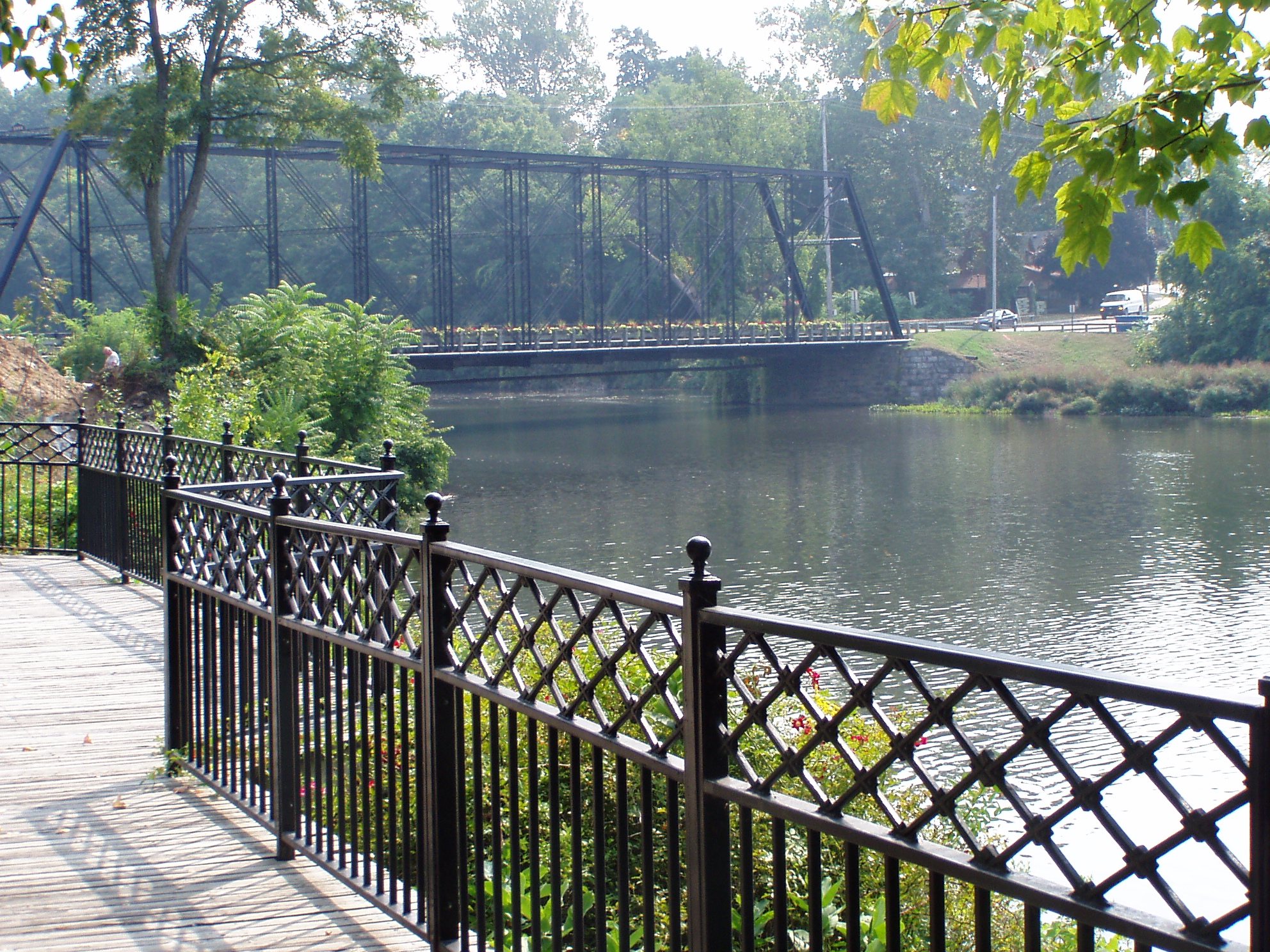
- Bridge in 2005
- Coordinates: 42.5258°N 85.8484°W
- Crosses: Kalamazoo River

Characteristics
- Width: 18 feet (5.5 m)
- Longest span: 225 feet (69 m)
- Clearance above: 15 to 20 feet (4.6 to 6.1 m)

History
- Designer: Zenas King
- Constructed by: King Iron Bridge Company
- Construction cost: $7,532.25
- Opened: late September 1886
- Second Street Bridge
- U.S. National Register of Historic Places
- Michigan State Historic Site
- Location: 2nd St., Allegan, Michigan, USA
- Built: 1886
- Architectural style: Whipple truss
- NRHP reference No.: 80001845

Significant dates
- Added to NRHP: June 11, 1980
- Designated MSHS: September 8, 1982

Location
- Interactive map of Second Street Bridge

The Second Street Bridge is a one-lane, single-span truss bridge in Allegan, in the U.S. state of Michigan, that carries Second Street over the Kalamazoo River. It is a Michigan State Historic Site, a National Historic Civil Engineering Landmark, and is listed on the National Register of Historic Places. Built in 1886, the bridge replaced an earlier wooden structure. In the early 1980s, the bridge underwent significant renovation.

== History ==
Prior to construction of the current structure, the river was spanned by a wooden bridge which had been in use for about fifty years. By the mid-1880s, the bridge had fallen into disrepair. The Allegan Journal and Tribune reported in March 1886 that "The structure miscalled a bridge ... is nearly buried in liquid mud, which serves to cover up some of the holes. We hope steps will be taken to secure an iron bridge before the old one tumbles down."

The replacement bridge was designed by Zenas King, founder of the King Iron Bridge Company, and the company began construction in 1886. The bridge was completed in two and a half months owing to fear that the wooden structure might collapse. Construction cost $7,532.25 and the bridge opened to traffic in late September. The bridge was one of the largest built by the company.

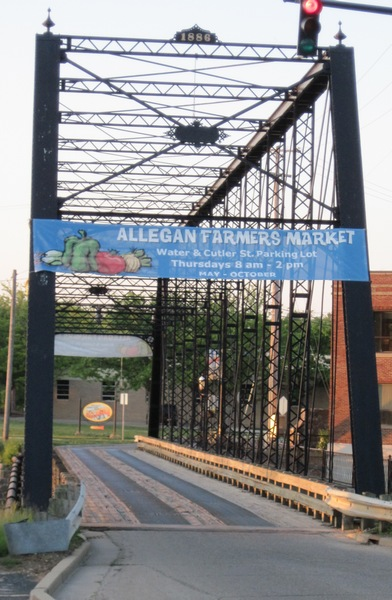
Looking down the length of the bridge in 2010, with traffic lights visible

In 1979, a structural analysis of the bridge indicated that the wrought iron was in good shape, but the deck was deteriorating. City officials chose to rehabilitate the bridge instead of replacing it because the structure is historic and further study showed that traffic problems would be exacerbated by replacing it with a two-lane structure. Because the bridge was not a critical transportation corridor, the city persuaded the federal government to fund rehabilitation, even though the project would not meet AASHTO standards. The project was approved in part because the bridge was made one-way to overcome the limitations of its narrow roadway. Funding was received in 1981, and the contract was awarded to low bidder H&K Construction for $552,000, compared to an estimated $1.2 million for replacement.

For rehabilitation, the 80-ton bridge was rolled ashore on a system of rails, pulled by a hydraulic crane winch. After erecting scaffolding, the bridge was disassembled and members shipped to Holland, Michigan, for repairs and painting. New components were manufactured in Grand Rapids. All components were tested by dye penetration and ultrasound to ensure their soundness. The bridge was then reassembled and rolled back over the river. In June 1983, the bridge's reopening was celebrated by a three-day "Bridgefest". At some point after rehabilitation, traffic lights were installed, permitting the resumption of two-way traffic on the now one-lane bridge.

Since 1995, the bridge has featured in the logo of the city of Allegan.

=== Historic designations ===
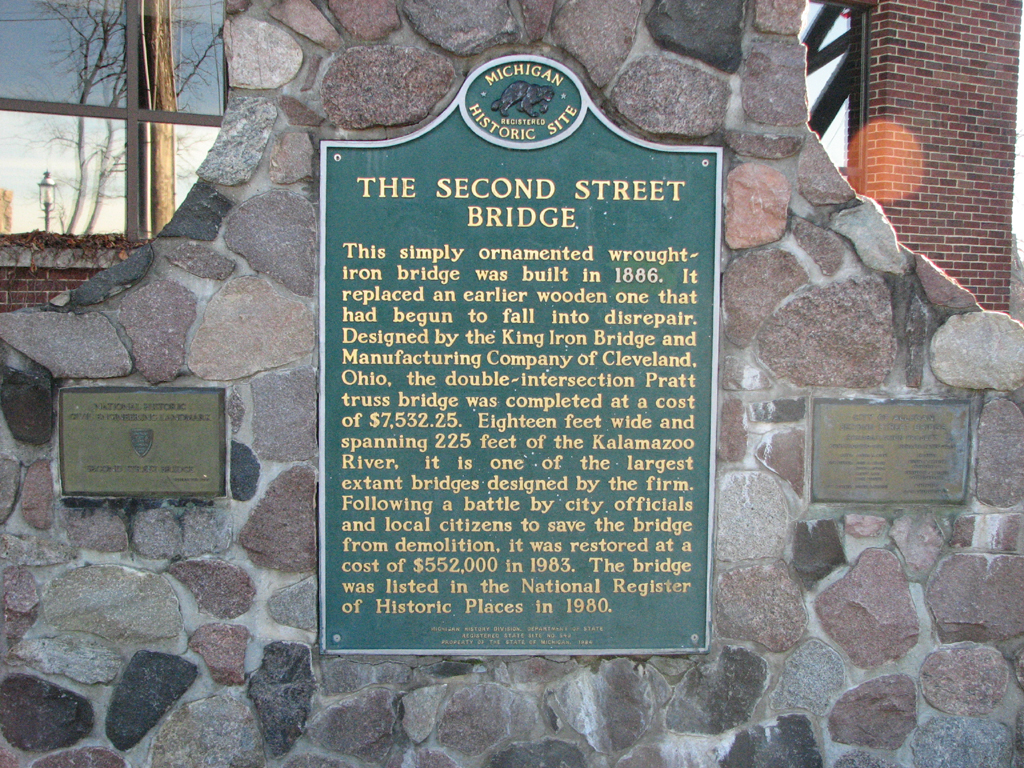
Michigan State Historic Site marker (center) and National Historic Civil Engineering Landmark sign (left)

The bridge was listed on the National Register of Historic Places on June 11, 1980. In 1982, the American Society of Civil Engineers designated it as a National Historic Civil Engineering Landmark. On September 8, 1982, the bridge was designated a Michigan State Historic Site and an informational marker was erected in 1984.

== Design ==
The Second Street Bridge has a single-span Whipple truss design, made of steel and iron. The bridge is 18 feet (5.5 m) wide and spans 225 feet (69 m) over the Kalamazoo River with 15 to 20 feet (4.6 to 6.1 m) of water clearance. Its abutments are made of granite fieldstone. The structure is decorated with lattice work, iron end post finials, and latticed metal handrails. On one side of the bridge is a pedestrian walkway with wood flooring.

== See also ==
- List of bridges on the National Register of Historic Places in Michigan
- National Register of Historic Places listings in Allegan County, Michigan
- List of Michigan State Historic Sites in Allegan County, Michigan
