= 1917–18 Michigan State Normal Normalites men's basketball team =

American college basketball season

1917–18 Michigan State Normal Normalites men's basketball
- Conference: Independent
- Record: 14–1
- Head coach: Elton J. Rynearson (1st season)
- Home arena: Gymnasium

The 1917–18 team finished with a record of 14–1. It was the 1st year for head coach Elton J. Rynearson. Allen E. Morris was the team captain.

== Roster ==
Number	Name	Position	Class	Hometown
	Dale J. Crowe	Center	Sophomore	Saugatuck, MI
	Louis H. Hollway	Guard		
	Allen E. Morris	Guard	Sophomore	Saline, MI
	Clarence Beeman	Guard		
	Henry Till	Guard		Saugatuck, MI
	Edward Powers	Forward		
	Roland Drake	Forward	Freshman	Milan, MI
	Kondratowitz	Forward		
	C.V. Millard		Sophomore	Detroit, MI

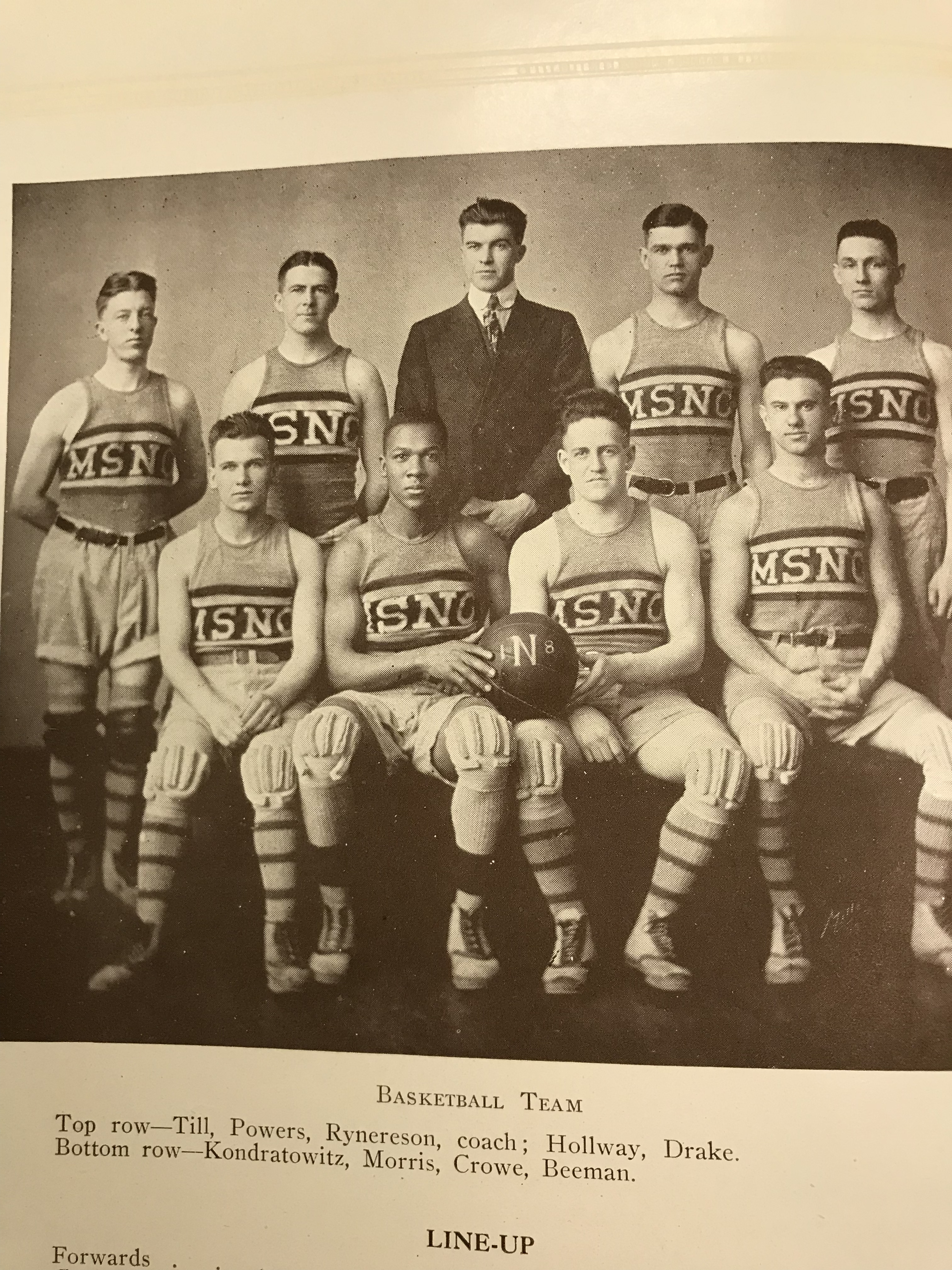
1918 Michigan State Normal College Men's Basketball Team

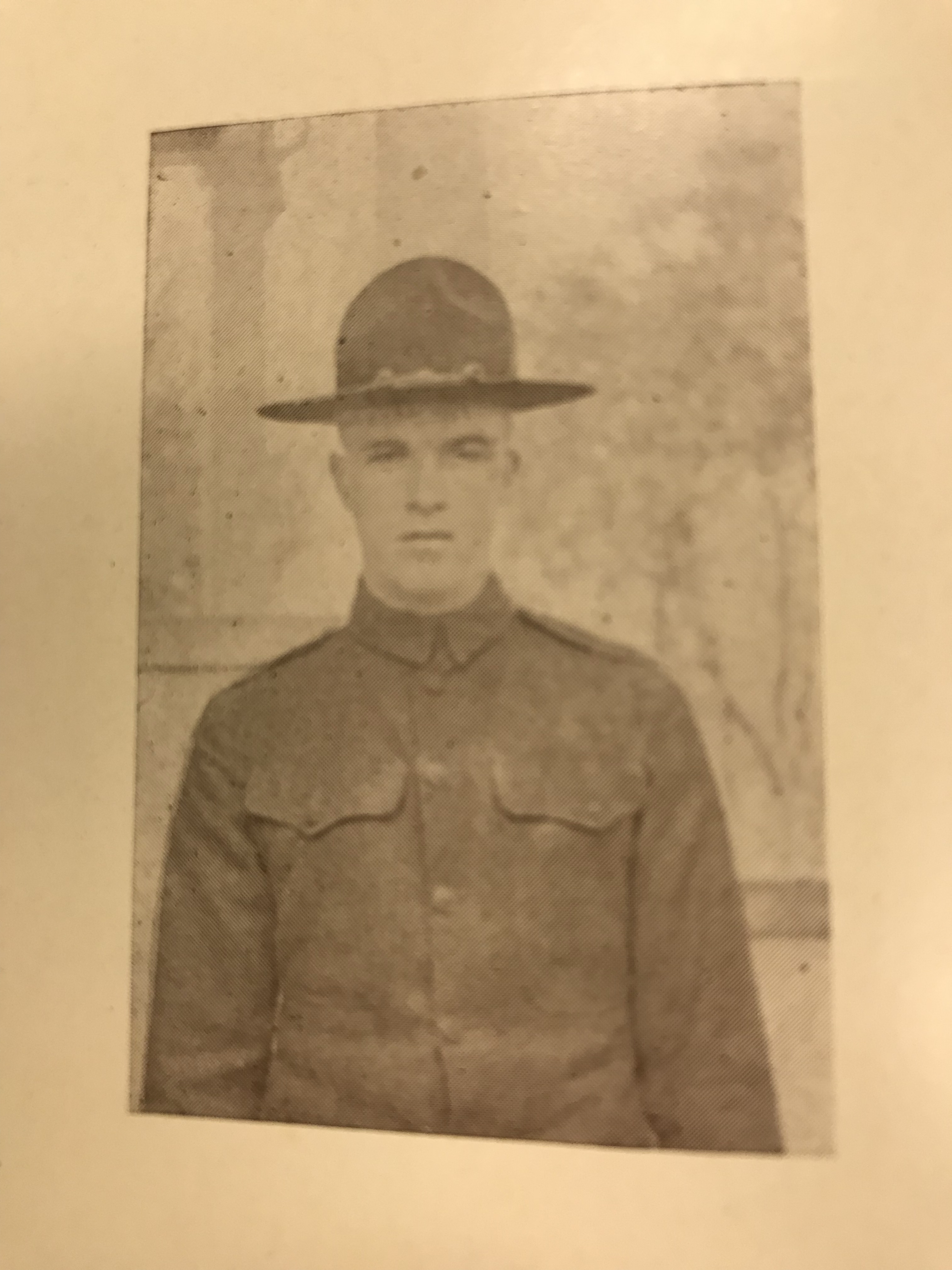
Elmer Rynerson 1918

== Schedule ==
Date time, TV	Rank^{#}	Opponent^{#}	Result	Record	Site (attendance) city, state
Non-conference regular season
January 12, 1918*		Detroit College of Law	W 44-25	1-0	Gymnasium; Ypsilanti, MI
January 1918*		at Bowling Green	W 31-27	2-0	Bowling Green, OH
January 19, 1918*		Alma College	W 31-20	3-0	Gymnasium; Ypsilanti, MI
January 26, 1918*		at Wayne State	L 16-23	3-1	Central H.S. Detroit, MI
January 31, 1918*		at Detroit College of Law	W 37-10	4-1	Detroit, MI
February 6, 1918*		Hillsdale College	W 44-15	5-1	Gymnasium; Ypsilanti, MI
February 8, 1918*		Alma College	W 24-15	6-1	Gymnasium; Ypsilanti, MI
February 9, 1918*		Central Michigan	W 28-24	7-1	Gymnasium; Ypsilanti, MI
February 13, 1918*		Assumption University	W 43-22	8-1	Gymnasium; Ypsilanti, MI
February 13, 1918*		at Toledo	W 49-20	9-1	Toledo, OH
February 16, 1918*		Central Michigan	W 50-18	10-1	Gymnasium; Ypsilanti, MI
February 20, 1918*		Wayne State	W 36-34 ^{OT}	11-1	Gymnasium; Ypsilanti, MI
February 1918*		at Windsor Assumption	W 49-15	12-1	Windsor, Ontario
March 8, 1918*		at Alma College	W 28-15	13-1	Alma, MI
March 9, 1918*		at Central Michigan	W 35-24	14-1	Central Hall; Mount Pleasant, MI
*Non-conference game. ^{#}Rankings from AP Poll. (#) Tournament seedings in parentheses. All times are in Eastern Time.

== Game Notes ==
=== January 21, 1918 ===
Aurora writes that the game was on 2/2.

=== February 9, 1918 ===
Aurora list score of 28-14.

=== February 20, 1918 ===
Wayne State has a score of 30-29. Aurora has a date of 2/27.

=== March 8, 1918 ===
Aurora list score of 24-15.

=== March 9, 1918 ===
Aurora list score of 28-14.
