= Hacklander Site =

Archaeological site in Michigan, United States

- U.S. National Register of Historic Places
- Michigan State Historic Site
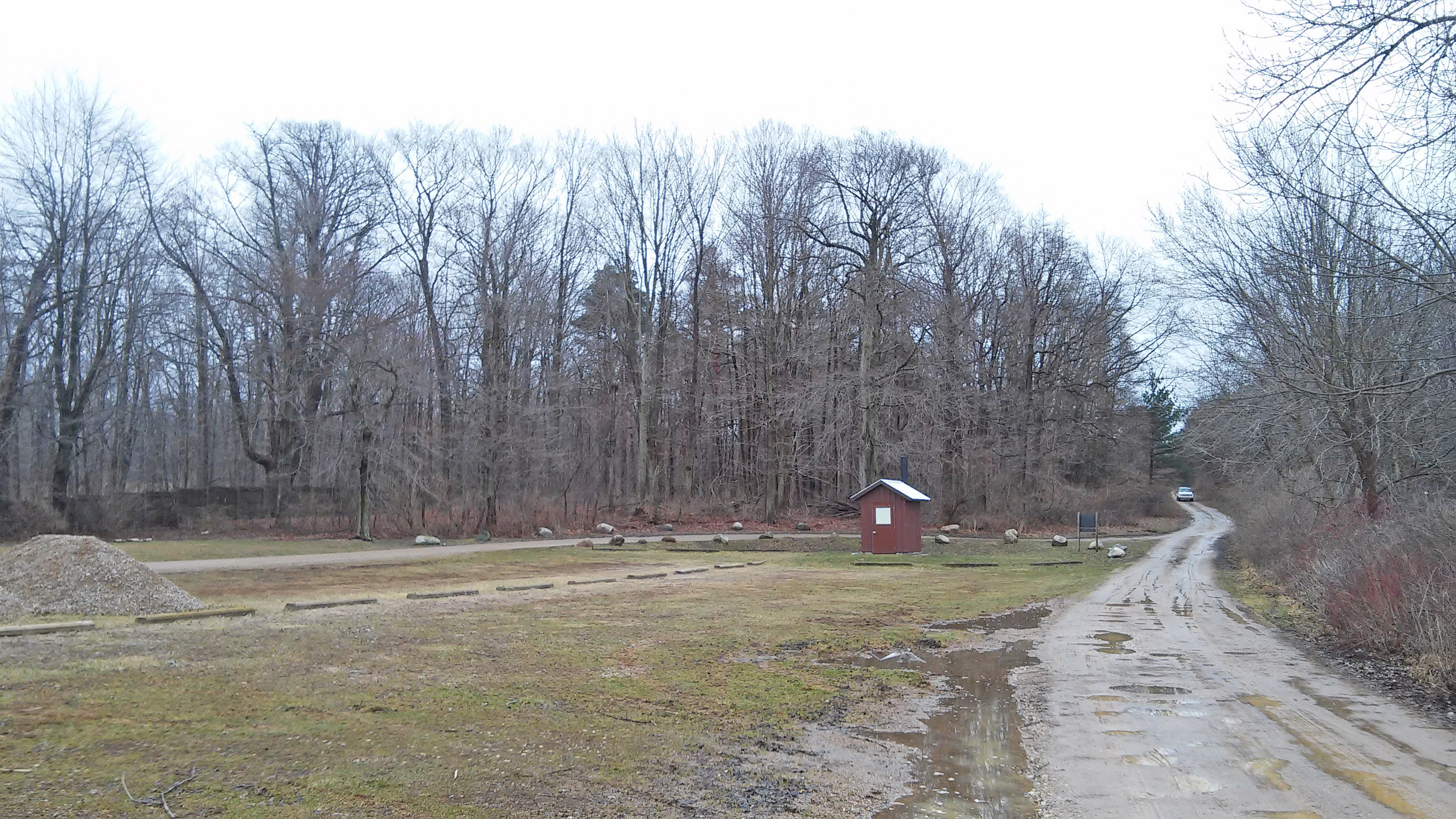

- Location within Michigan Location within the United States
- Nearest city: Douglas, Michigan
- Coordinates: 42°38′5″N 86°9′45″W
- Area: 2 acres (0.81 ha)
- NRHP reference No.: 73002150
- Added to NRHP: July 27, 1973

The Hacklander Site, also designated 20AE78, is an archaeological site located on the south shore of the Kalamazoo River east of Douglas, Michigan. It was added to the National Register of Historic Places in 1973. The site is significant because it represents much of what is understood about Woodland period life in the region.

== Description ==
The Hacklander Site is along the south shore of the Kalamazoo River next to a small stream. The site extends to the base of a nearby bluff paralleling the river.

The Hacklander Site is a large multi-component Middle Woodland period site, likely representing an ongoing seasonal occupation of the site.

== History ==
Components at the site indicate that it was occupied during the Late Woodland period, possibly as early as 600 CE. The site was likely used as a seasonal camp through approximately 1000 to 1100 CE. The site was sporadically used later with evidence of occupation in approximately 1200-1300 CE, some time after 1300, and around 1760–1820. These later occupations were likely unrelated to each other and to the site's earlier use as a seasonal camp.

The Hacklander Site was discovered in the 1960s by a local collector, who notified archaeologists of the site in 1971. Initial excavations were carried out in 1971 and extended into the next year. Over two years of excavations, researchers discovered more than 20,000 ceramic potsherds, as well as 80,000 stone artifacts (including Woodland points) and debitage.

The site takes its name from George Hacklander. He purchased the property in 1928 and his estate sold it in 1973. The Michigan Department of Natural Resources (DNR) bought part of the land in 1941 and their construction of a river access point for boating has had a major impact on the site.
