= Etymology of Kalamazoo =

Etymology

The origin of the name of the Kalamazoo River in U.S. state of Michigan, and several settled places named after it, including the city of Kalamazoo, Kalamazoo Township, and Kalamazoo County is uncertain. Several theories have been proposed.

== Etymology theories ==
A number of etymologies (some of them folk etymologies) have been proposed, all of which suggest that the name was derived from the languages of local indigenous peoples, the historic Potawatomi, Ojibwe, and Miami. Some of the theories are:

1. It is derived from the Potawatomi word negikanamazo, which is variously translated as "otter tail" or "stones like otters". This could refer to area wildlife. This interpretation was apparently suggested by Henry Schoolcraft, a US Indian agent in the region in the 19th century.
2. Another popular account is the legend of a Potawatomi warrior named Fleet Foot. In order to win his bride, he was required to run from his settlement to a point on the river and back before a pot of water boiled away. This event is thought to have occurred in 1810, a couple of decades before the first whites settled permanently here. The Potawatomi word kikalamezo appears on an 1823 atlas of the area. The word translates as "boiling pot" or "place where the water boils", and refers to the Fleet Foot legend.
3. The "boiling pot" translation may also refer to various nearby bends in the river that resemble pots.
4. Alternative translations of kikalamezo include "beautiful water", "mirage" or "reflecting waters", and could refer to the once-clear waters of the river, which are now somewhat clouded by pollution.
5. The current name used by the local Ojibwa and Odawa tribes for Kalamazoo is Giikanaamozoog, this means, "They have been smoked/cured". The explanation given for this name is that the dark waters of the Kalamazoo River have a smokey appearance.
6. It may also have referred to a place to ford the river. The city was originally established near one of the few places in the area where it was easy to cross by wading.
7. Early official papers refer to the name of Kalamazoo as derived from a Potawatomi term meaning "the area where animals wounded by Indians crawl to die".

In his Indian Names in Michigan (1986), Virgil Vogel explained that when Kalamazoo County was formed on July 30, 1830, it "was allegedly named from the 'Indian' name of the river, Ke-kanaamazoo, 'the boiling pot'." There had been various transliterations of the term. In the 1821 Treaty of Chicago, the village of Match-e-be nash-she-wish, was described as at the head of the "Kekalamazoo river" (this village became the present-day city).

Vogel suggests the following interpretations for the source of Kalamazoo as more credible than other accounts:

- a corruption of Ojibwe kikikamagad, meaning "it goes or runs fast"
- a mangled form of Kalimink, which is also the name of a creek in Ingham County
- a mangled form of Killomick, a variant of an early name for the Calumet River, which meant "deep, still water"

Vogel suggests that the word "may be from the Miami, because of the presence of l." He cites Father Chrysostam Verwyst saying the name Kalamazoo comes from Ojibwe as a "corruption of Kikanamsoso", meaning "it smokes, or he is troubled with smoke", and pronounced "kee-kah-nah-mo-zo or kee-kau-nau-mo-zo". Vogel cites William R. Gerard as concurring in this opinion, that "Kalamazoo is a slight alteration of older Ojibwe kikalâmoza, meaning 'he is inconvenienced by smoke in his lodge'." Vogel cites Gerard as dismissing Schoolcraft's opinion that the name was from negikanamazoo, or "otters beneath the surface" as an "etymological absurdity". However, Vogel also suggests that both Verwyst and Gerard accounts also "deserve this label". Vogel also dismisses the view that the name means "mirage or reflecting river".

== Bibliography ==
- Vogel, Virgil J. (1986). Indian Names in Michigan. Ann Arbor, Michigan: The University of Michigan Press. ISBN 0-472-10069-6.
- "How Kalamazoo Got Its Name". Kalamazoo Public Library: Local history.
