= Saugatuck Chain Ferry =

Hand-cranked chain ferry

Coordinates: 42.6584°N 86.2058°W

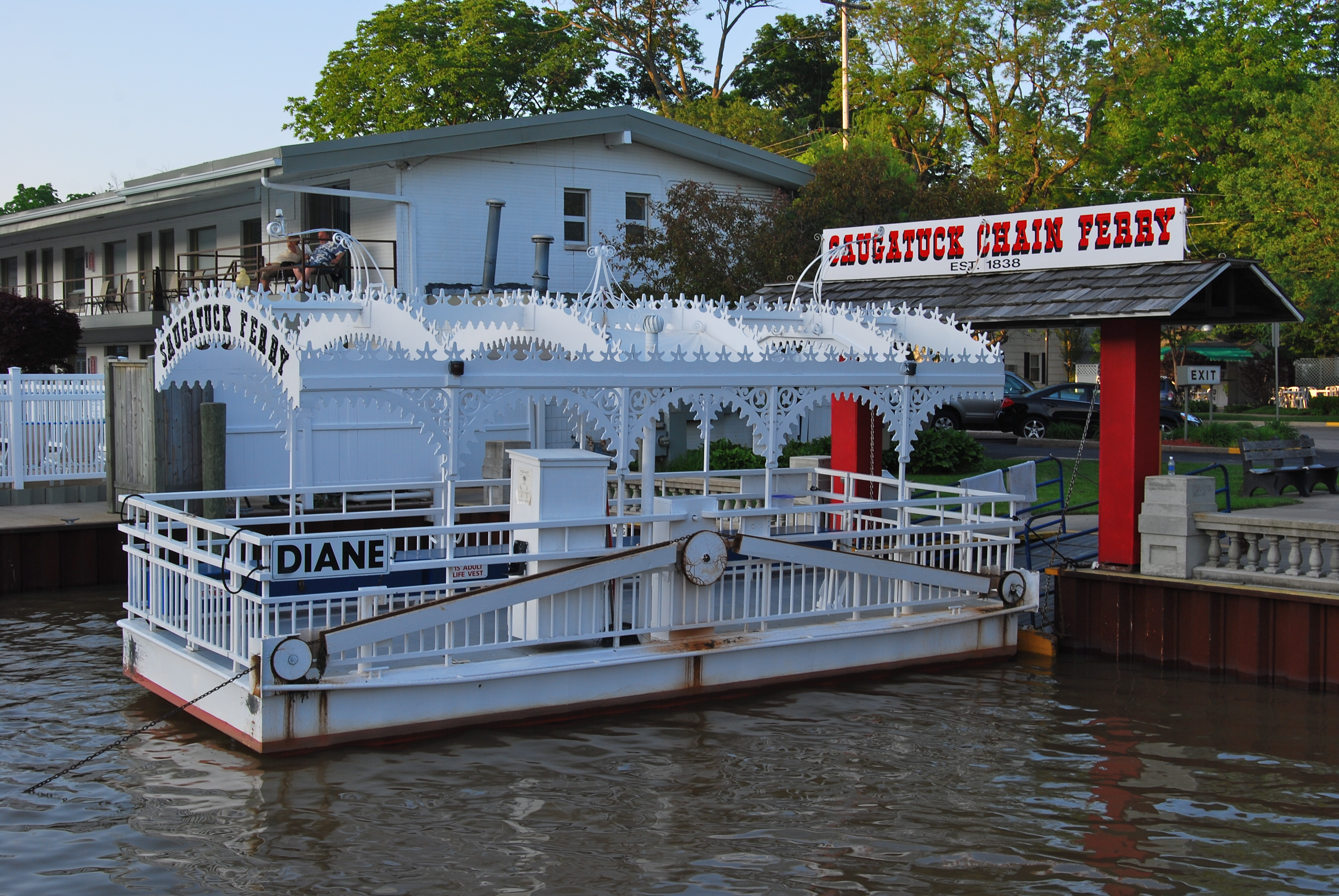
Saugatuck Chain Ferry in 2009

The Saugatuck Chain Ferry is a hand-cranked chain ferry that crosses the Kalamazoo River in Saugatuck, Michigan. It connects downtown Saugatuck to Mount Baldhead Park and Oval Beach. It is the only operational hand-cranked chain ferry in the Great Lakes region, and it is also believed to be the last such ferry operating in the United States.

== Operation ==
The crossing, which is about 100 yards (91 m), takes approximately five minutes to make. The ferry operates seasonally, from Memorial Day to Labor Day. It has a crew of two. It is chiefly crewed by college students. The crew members crank the ferry by hand across the river. It operates approximately every 10 to 15 minutes, based on demand, but not in inclement weather. The ferry can carry up to 24 passengers per crossing.

== History ==
The Saugatuck Chain Ferry was first operated in 1857. It was opened as a replacement for a bridge that was damaged by flooding and passing schooners. The first ferry operator was 19-year-old Darius Billings. In 1897, Jay Meyers became the operator, a position he served in for the next 21 years. In 1931, L.S. Brittain was the ferry operator. The ferry went out of business in 1940 after being bypassed by an automobile bridge built upriver and also replaced by a rowboat.

In 1965, local businessman R.J. Peterson restored chain ferry service with a new ferry, named Diane after his wife. Around 2005, Peterson sold the ferry to the City of Saugatuck, which continues to operate it. After Peterson sold the ferry, it was managed by the husband-and-wife team of Bruce and Marilyn Starring until their retirement at the end of the 2017 season. Marilyn Starring coordinated personnel and United States Coast Guard inspections while Bruce provided maintenance for the ferry.

In 2018, the ferry did not operate on Labor Day weekend, closing prematurely because all of its captains and most of its crew returned to college. At the time, the ferry could only be operated if one of the crew was a captain, licensed by the Coast Guard. In response to this incident, the city worked with United States Representative Fred Upton to obtain a waiver exempting the Saugatuck Chain Ferry from the Coast Guard captain licensing requirement. Upton argued that such a license was not necessary to safely operate a chain ferry, noting that because the ferry "travels only 100 yards, and does so while connected to a chain permanently connected to shore the entire time, the risks to passengers is [sic] minimal and almost completely mitigated by safety procedures". In January 2019, Upton's waiver was included as part of the Coast Guard bill passed by the United States House of Representatives and Senate.
