= Warner P. Sutton House =

- U.S. National Register of Historic Places
- Michigan State Historic Site
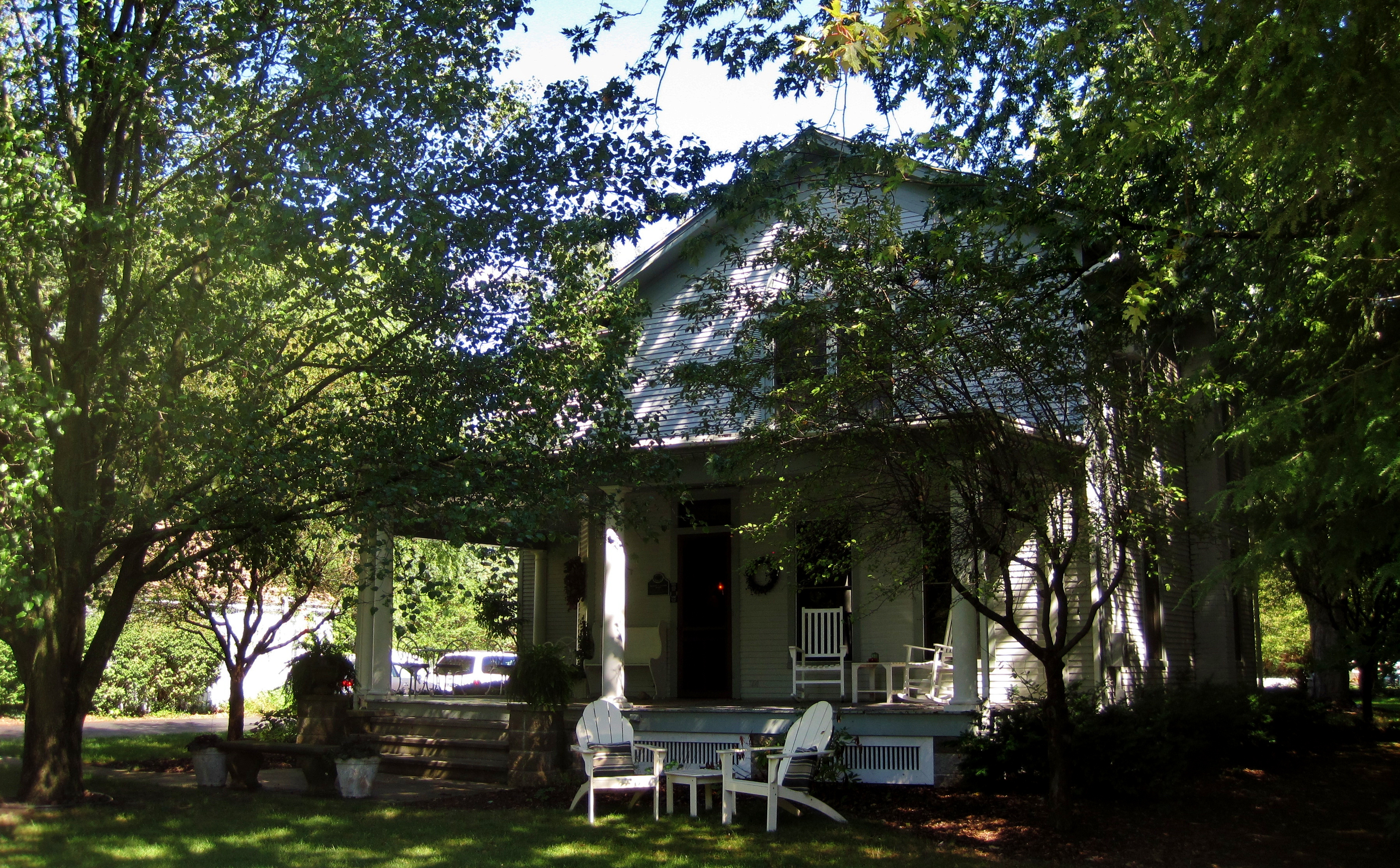

- Location within Michigan Location within the United States
- Interactive map
- Location: 736 Pleasant St., Saugatuck, Michigan
- Coordinates: 42°39′13″N 86°11′47″W
- Area: less than one acre
- Built: 1874
- Architectural style: Colonial Revival, Late Victorian
- NRHP reference No.: 91001999
- Added to NRHP: January 22, 1992

The Warner P. Sutton House, also known as The Beeches or Beechwood Manor, is a private house located at 736 Pleasant Street in Saugatuck, Michigan. It was listed on the National Register of Historic Places in 1992. It now operates as the Beechwood Manor Inn Bed & Breakfast.

== History ==
The Warner P. Sutton House was constructed in 1874 by Roland Barnard. It is named after Warner P. Sutton, who served as a United States diplomat in Mexico and an attorney specializing in the field of international law.

Warner Perrin Sutton was born on October 16, 1849, the son of Luther Sutton and Priscilla Jane Bancroft. Warner Sutton began his career as a school teacher and journalist, and married Lois Andrus in 1874. The Suttons moved to Saugatuck in 1875, where Warner Sutton assumed the position of principal of the union school. In 1877, Sutton purchased this house for his family.

In 1878, Sutton was appointed U.S. Commercial Agent at Matamoros, Mexico upon the recommendation of his friend Senator Thomas W. Ferry. In 1883 he was appointed consul general for northern Mexico, and in 1889 was transferred to Nuevo Laredo, where he served until 1893. From 1893 to 1900 he operated an international law practice in Washington DC. In 1900, he had a stroke which left him an invalid until his death in 1913.

Sutton continued to own this home until his death, naming it "The Beeches." His family used it as a summer home during the years they lived in Mexico and in Washington DC. Several alterations were made to the house around 1900, including the installation of the front porch.

In 1986, the house was saved from demolition and had an addition constructed, as well as other renovation. In 1990 it opened as the Beechwood Manor Inn Bed & Breakfast.

== Description ==
The Warner P. Sutton house is a two-story wood frame cross-gabled L-plan dwelling. It stands on a concrete block foundation and is clad with clapboards. A Tuscan-column, wraparound veranda runs across the front of the house. Windows are double-hung one-over-one units in plain wooden frames; the front door has a hood and transom. A 1986 single-story addition extends to the rear.

On the interior, the main floor contains the foyer, two parlors, a sitting room, and a dining room in the original section of the house. The 1986 addition contains a kitchen, laundry room, bathroom, and recreation room. The second story contains four bedrooms and two bathrooms.
