= Michigan Paper Company Mill Historic District =

Historic district in Michigan, United States

- U.S. National Register of Historic Places
- U.S. Historic district
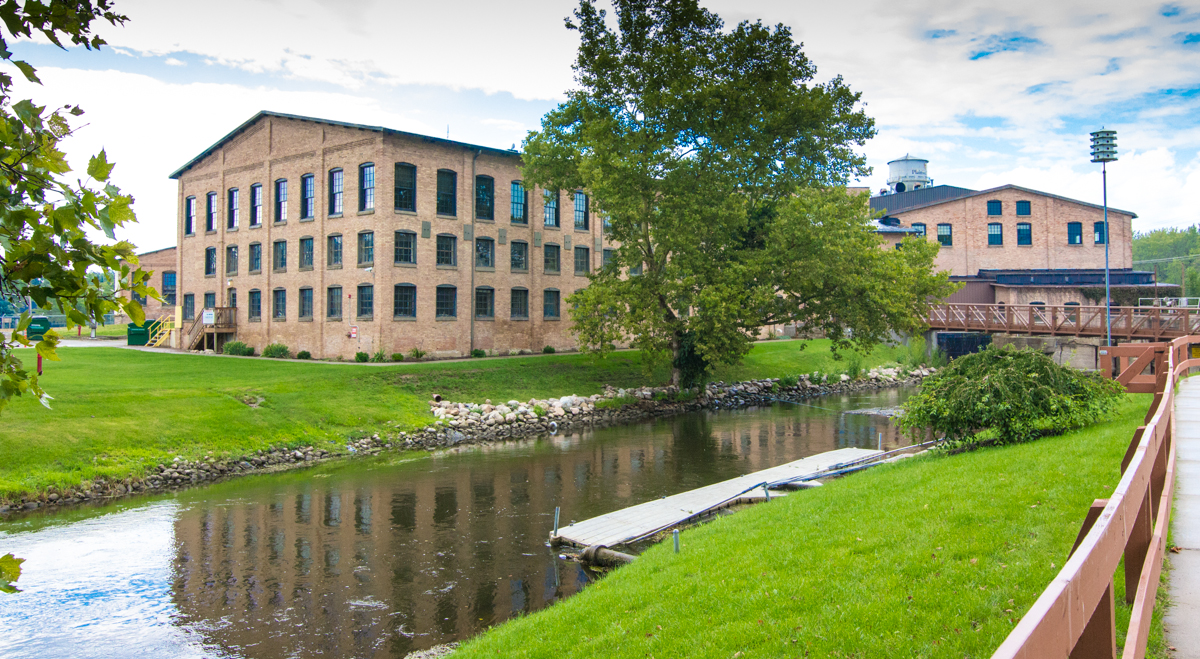

- Location within Michigan Location within the United States
- Interactive map
- Location: 200 Allegan St., Plainwell, Michigan
- Coordinates: 42°26′40″N 85°38′40″W
- Area: 9.7 acres (3.9 ha)
- Built: 1887
- Architect: Daniel J. Albertson
- NRHP reference No.: 11000636
- Added to NRHP: September 8, 2011

The Michigan Paper Company Mill Historic District, also known as the Plainwell Paper Company Complex, is a complex of industrial buildings located at 200 Allegan Street in Plainwell, Michigan. It was added to the National Register of Historic Places in 2011.

== History ==
The first paper mill established in the southwest Michigan region was the Kalamazoo Paper Company, which was constructed on Portage Creek in Kalamazoo in 1867 by Benjamin F. Lyon, an experienced paper mill operator from Fitchburg, Massachusetts. Although this business was ultimately unsuccessful, Lyon persevered, and in 1872 formed a partnership with Hale W. Page, another Fitchburg paper mill operator. The two constructed another mill near downtown Plainwell, which had just recently been connected to the Michigan Central Railroad. In 1887, Page formed another partnership with local Plainwell businessmen, and founded the Michigan Paper Company. They constructed a paper mill on this site, next to Lyon's 1872 mill.

The Michigan Paper Company was an immediate success, and in 1890 they purchased the B. F. Lyon & Co. Mill, which had ceased production only three years earlier. In 1906, the company massively expanded their factory complex, engaging architect Daniel J. Albertson to design a complete new mill. Albertson designed eight new buildings for the site, allowing the paper making process to operate much like the assembly line in an auto factory. The company continued to thrive, and in 1910 expanded again, constructing a new office building and another set of buildings which mirrored the 1906 expansion, giving the company two separate production lines.

In 1927, Michigan Paper purchased a paper coating company in Kalamazoo, and in 1940 moved the coating machinery to the Plainwell plant. In 1954, W.C. Hamilton and Sons purchased the outstanding stocks, and the business became a wholly owned subsidiary of the national corporation of Hamilton Paper. Michigan Paper began to compete as a niche paper manufacturer, and at the same time demolished its office building and constructed a new one. In 1961, Weyerhaeuser purchased the company, and in 1970 it was sold to Philip Morris, who renamed it the Plainwell Paper Company and continued to remodel the complex.

The company was sold multiple times in the 1980s, and was eventually included as an EPA superfund site. The mill was eventually decommissioned in 2000, and in 2006 sold to the city of Plainwell. Preliminary environmental cleanup took place in 2007. In 2010, the City of Plainwell signed a developer's agreement with Conestoga Rovers and Associates to clean up and redevelop the property. Some structures were demolished, and others redeveloped. In 2014, the Plainwell City Hall and the Plainwell Department of Public Safety were relocated into the complex.

== Description ==
The Michigan Paper Company Mill Historic District over a dozen two- and three-story industrial brick buildings, along with a brick and terra cotta block power house, some corrugated steel warehouses and metal structures, water towers, storage tanks, and rail spurs. The structures in the complex structures date from 1887 to 1995.

The original 1887 mill was an L-shaped building, consisting of a one-story machine room measuring 32 feet by 130 feet and a two-story main building measuring 46 feet by 98 feet. The machine room was demolished in 1906, but the main building remains. It was converted into offices in 1975, and is now designated as building 19 and 20.

Most of the 1906 and 1910 buildings remain on the site. These include the first machine room (building 10), the beater room (building 11), finishing room (building 16), stock house (building 17) chemical and duster room (building 18), and the finishing room (building 15), all constructed in 1906. The finishing room was substantially modified in 1953. 1910 buildings include the second stock house (building 1), second cooker room (building 2), second beater room (building 3), second boiler house (building 6), and the second machine room (building 9). A handful of other buildings were constructed in the 1930s and 1940s.
