= Douglas Union School =

- U.S. National Register of Historic Places
- Michigan State Historic Site
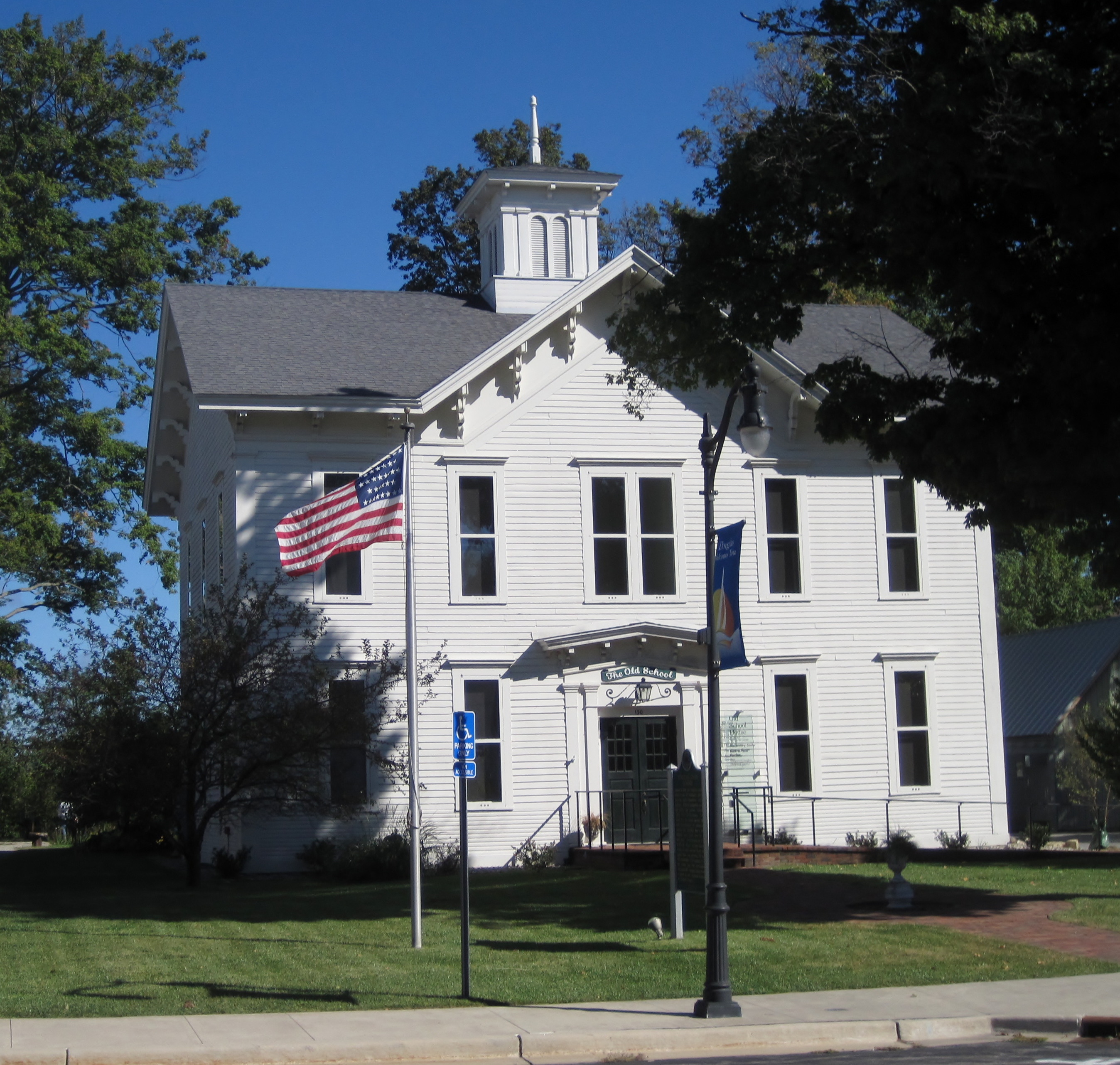

- Location within Michigan Location within the United States
- Interactive map
- Location: 130 Center St., Douglas, Michigan
- Coordinates: 42°38′38″N 86°12′13″W
- Area: less than one acre
- Built: 1866
- Architectural style: Italianate
- NRHP reference No.: 95000870
- Added to NRHP: July 21, 1995

The Douglas Union School at 130 Center St. in Douglas, Michigan was built in 1866. It was listed on the National Register of Historic Places in 1995. The school is one of Michigan's oldest extant multi-classroom union school buildings, constructed soon after the state law authorizing union schools was adopted. It currently serves as the Old School House History Center.

== History ==
In 1843, the state of Michigan adopted a law authorizing separate school districts located within a township which contained a city or village to merge into a "union" district. In the mid-1860s, Districts 3 and 4 of Saugatuck Township, Michigan merged into a union district. In 1866, the resulting Union School District purchased this site, and constructed the school during the 1866–67 school year. The school opened for classes in September 1867, with two teachers and 129 students. Although the number of grades taught at the time was not recorded, the school served as many as twelve grades in later years, and only dropped to eight or nine in the 1920s when district students were sent to the Saugatuck High School.

The Union School was used by students in the district until 1957, when it was closed. The district sold the school in 1960, and the building was converted into four apartments in 1962. In 2007, the Saugatuck Douglas History Center acquired the building and substantially renovated it, turning it into the Old School House History Center.

== Description ==
The Douglas Union School is a two-story, side-gable, wood-frame building covered with clapboards. A square-plan, hip-roof belfry is located at the midpoint of the roof ridge. The front facade is symmetrical, with five bays. The central bay contains the main entrance on the first floor, paired square-head, non-over-nine windows on the second floor, and a subsidiary gable above in the center of the roofline. The remaining bays each have a single square-head, non-over-nine window on each floor. The entrance contains double doors flanked by pilasters and surmounted by a pediment and frieze below a projecting cornice.

The interior likely originally held two classrooms on the first floor and a hall on the second floor. At some point, the second floor space was converted into two additional classrooms similar to those on the first floor. The renovation into four apartments retained the original classroom separation, and the renovation into the History Center maintained the basic layout.
