= Douglas, Michigan =

- City
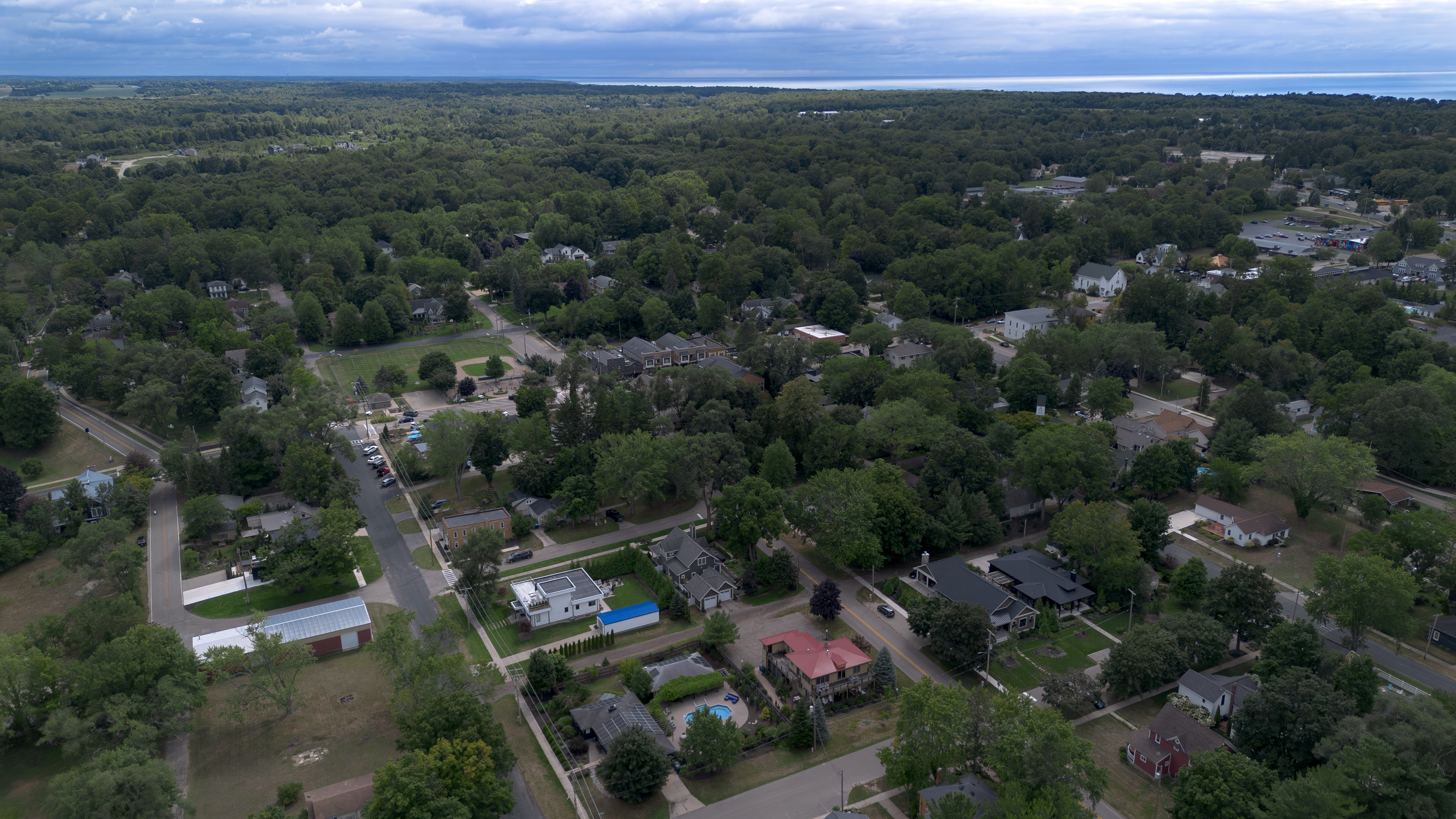
- Aerial view of Douglas

- Flag Seal
- Motto: "The Village of Friendliness since 1870"
- Location of Douglas, Michigan
- Coordinates: 42°38′34″N 86°12′22″W
- Country: United States
- State: Michigan
- County: Allegan

Government
  - Mayor: Cathy North

Area
  - Total: 2.01 sq mi (5.20 km^{2})
  - Land: 1.78 sq mi (4.61 km^{2})
  - Water: 0.23 sq mi (0.59 km^{2})
- Elevation: 610 ft (186 m)

Population (2020)
  - Total: 1,378
  - Density: 774.6/sq mi (299.08/km^{2})
- Time zone: UTC-5 (Eastern (EST))
  - Summer (DST): UTC-4 (EDT)
- ZIP code: 49406
- Area code: 269
- FIPS code: 26-22740
- GNIS feature ID: 0624823
- Website: https://douglasmi.gov/

Douglas (officially known as the City of the Village of Douglas) is a city in Allegan County in the U.S. state of Michigan. The population was 1,378 at the 2020 census. The city is surrounded by Saugatuck Township and the city of Saugatuck is adjacent on the north.

Douglas had long been a village within Saugatuck Township. On December 13, 2004, residents voted to adopt a charter incorporating Douglas as a city. Under Michigan law, cities are independent entities whereas villages are part of the township. The official name is City of the Village of Douglas.

== Neighborhoods ==
- Beachmont is located on Lakeshore Drive along Lake Michigan.
- Summer Grove is on Wiley Road half of a mile from Lake Michigan.

== History ==
Douglas, originally known as Dudleyville, was first settled by European-Americans in 1851 as a lumber mill town. In 1861, residents changed the name to Douglas. Reportedly the name was chosen to honor the American statesman Stephen A. Douglas, but other reports indicate that a relative of the original owner of the land also suggested the name because he came from Douglas, the capital of the Isle of Man. Douglas was incorporated as a village in 1870.

Area sawmills provided much of the lumber used to rebuild Chicago after the Great Chicago Fire of 1871. After most of the harvestable trees in the area were cleared by the lumber industry, the area became a center for growing and shipping fruit, especially peaches. Tourism and resorts also became an important part of the area economy.

== Geography ==
According to the United States Census Bureau, the city has a total area of 1.98 square miles (5.13 km^{2}), of which 1.75 square miles (4.53 km^{2}) is land and 0.23 square miles (0.60 km^{2}) is water. The city has over 1.5 miles of coastline along the shores of Lake Michigan, and over two miles of frontage along the meandering Kalamazoo River and Lake Kalamazoo Harbor.

== Demographics ==
Historical population
Census	Pop.	Note	%±
1880	522		—
1890	404		−22.6%
1900	444		9.9%
1910	485		9.2%
1920	305		−37.1%
1930	368		20.7%
1940	421		14.4%
1950	447		6.2%
1960	602		34.7%
1970	813		35.0%
1980	948		16.6%
1990	1,040		9.7%
2000	1,214		16.7%
2010	1,232		1.5%
2020	1,378		11.9%
U.S. Decennial Census

=== 2010 census ===
As of the census of 2010, there were 1,232 people, 645 households, and 279 families residing in the city. The population density was 704.0 inhabitants per square mile (271.8/km^{2}). There were 1,075 housing units at an average density of 614.3 per square mile (237.2/km^{2}). The racial makeup of the city was 97.2% White, 0.6% African American, 0.2% Native American, 0.2% Asian, 0.9% from other races, and 0.9% from two or more races. Hispanic or Latino of any race were 3.7% of the population.

There were 645 households, of which 15.7% had children under the age of 18 living with them, 33.3% were married couples living together, 7.0% had a female householder with no husband present, 2.9% had a male householder with no wife present, and 56.7% were non-families. 46.0% of all households were made up of individuals, and 17.5% had someone living alone who was 65 years of age or older. The average household size was 1.82 and the average family size was 2.60.

The median age in the city was 54.3 years. 14% of residents were under the age of 18; 3.5% were between the ages of 18 and 24; 14.9% were from 25 to 44; 41.6% were from 45 to 64; and 26% were 65 years of age or older. The gender makeup of the city was 50.0% male and 50.0% female.

=== 2000 census ===
As of the census of 2000, there were 1,214 people, 587 households and 284 families residing in the city of Douglas. The population density was 691.6 inhabitants per square mile (267.0/km^{2}). There were 853 housing units at an average density of 486.0 per square mile (187.6/km^{2}). The racial makeup of the city was 96.87% White, 0.58% African American, 0.08% Native American, 0.16% Asian, 0.74% from other races, and 1.57% from two or more races. Hispanic or Latino of any race were 2.64% of the population.

There were 587 households, out of which 18.9% had children under the age of 18 living with them, 35.6% were married couples living together, 9.4% had a female householder with no husband present, and 51.6% were non-families. 43.6% of all households were made up of individuals, and 19.1% had someone living alone who was 65 years of age or older. The average household size was 1.91 and the average family size was 2.60.

In the city, the population was spread out, with 16.1% under the age of 18, 4.1% from 18 to 24, 23.4% from 25 to 44, 30.7% from 45 to 64, and 25.6% who were 65 years of age or older. The median age was 48 years. For every 100 females, there were 86.8 males. For every 100 females age 18 and over, there were 87.1 males.

The median income for a household in the city was $41,250, and the median income for a family was $49,750. Males had a median income of $38,750 versus $28,906 for females. The per capita income for the city was $26,517. About 8.7% of families and 10.3% of the population were below the poverty line, including 14.5% of those under age 18 and 8.5% of those age 65 or over.

== Arts and culture ==
Douglas is well known for its art galleries and dining options. Water Street Gallery, LaFontsee Galleries, Button Gallery, Mr. Miller's Art Emporium, and LebenArt Gallery are just a few of the well known stops for local and national artworks.

== Notable person ==
- George Washington Maher - early 20th century Prairie School style architect
