= Saugatuck, Michigan =

- City
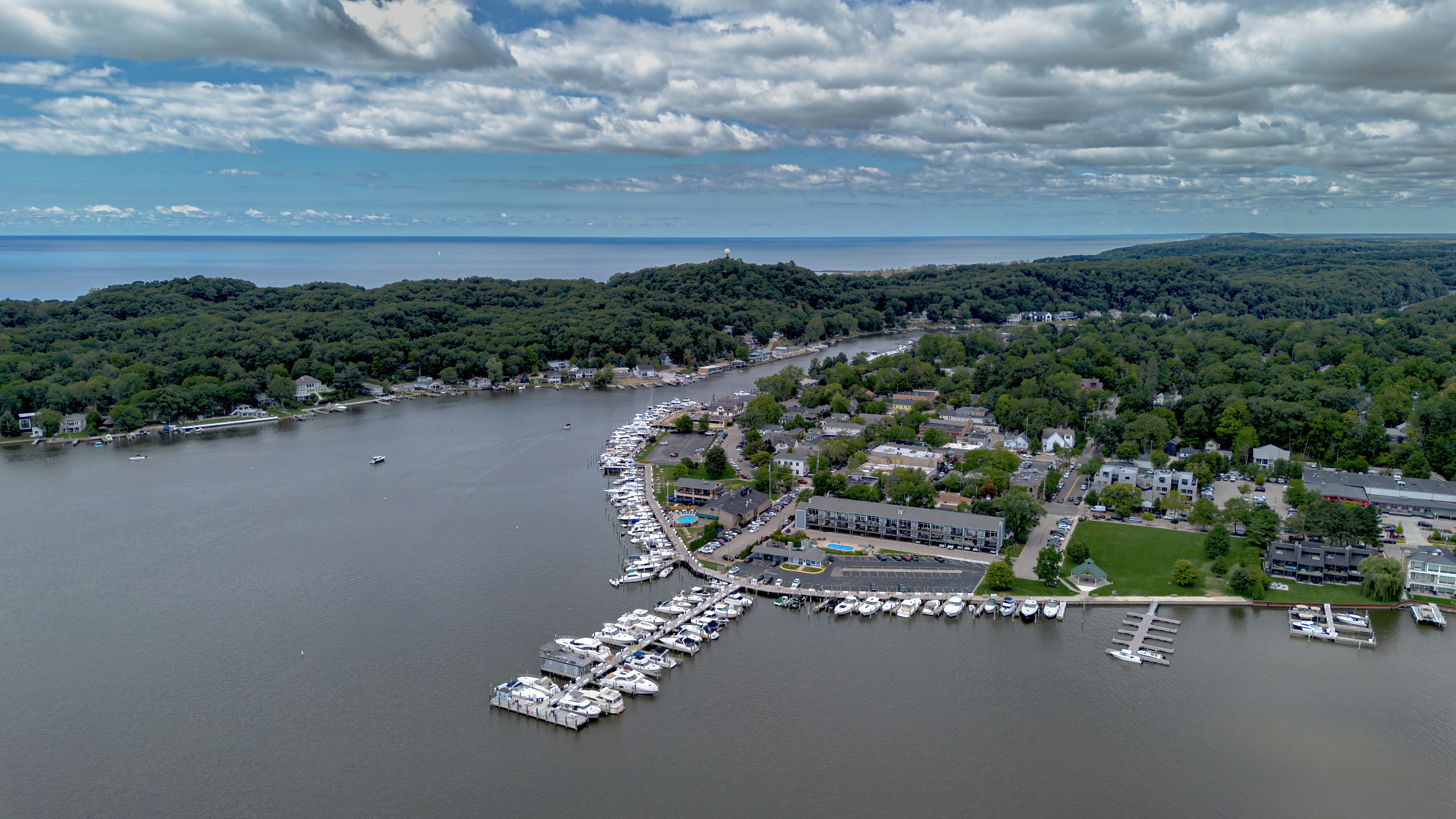
- Aerial view of Saugatuck

- Logo

- Location of Saugatuck, Michigan
- Coordinates: 42°39′26″N 86°12′9″W
- Country: United States
- State: Michigan
- County: Allegan
- Incorporated: 1868

Area
  - Total: 1.77 sq mi (4.58 km^{2})
  - Land: 1.39 sq mi (3.60 km^{2})
  - Water: 0.38 sq mi (0.98 km^{2})
- Elevation: 594 ft (181 m)

Population (2020)
  - Total: 865
  - Density: 621.6/sq mi (240.02/km^{2})
- Time zone: UTC-5 (Eastern (EST))
  - Summer (DST): UTC-4 (EDT)
- ZIP code: 49453
- Area code: 269
- FIPS code: 26-71700
- GNIS feature ID: 0637271
- Website: www.saugatuckcity.com

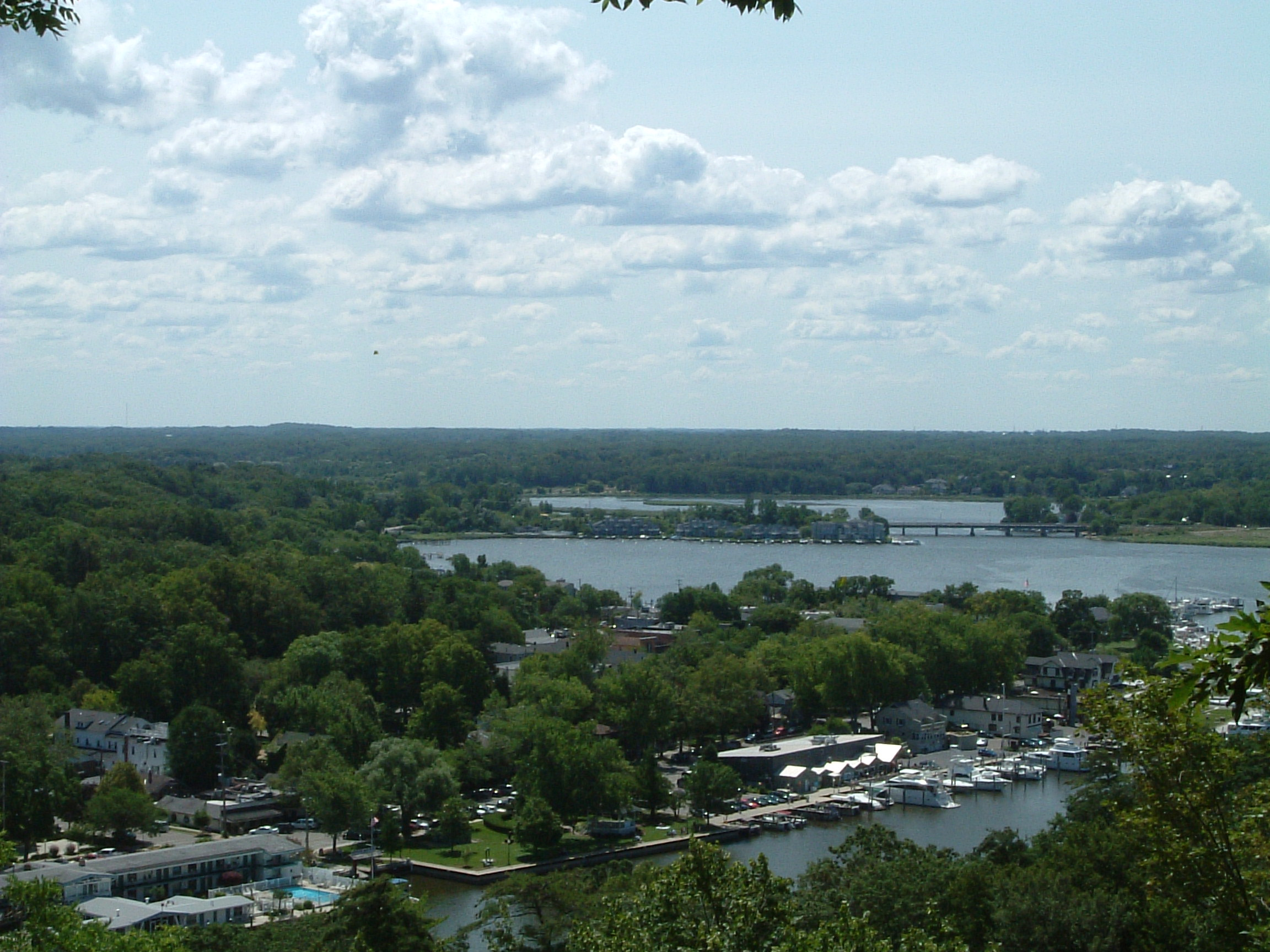
View of downtown Saugatuck and the Kalamazoo River from atop Mt. Baldhead

Saugatuck (/ˈsɔːɡəˈtʌk/ SAW-gə-tuck) is a city in Allegan County in the U.S. state of Michigan. The population was 865 at the 2020 census. The city is within Saugatuck Township, but is administratively autonomous.

Originally a lumber town and port, Saugatuck, along with the adjacent city of Douglas, became a noted art colony and tourist destination in the Arts and Crafts movement of the late 19th century. In the early 20th century, Saugatuck was home to the famous Big Pavilion, a large dance hall that attracted bands and visitors from across the Midwest. The building was a popular destination on Lake Michigan from its construction in 1909 until it burned down on May 6, 1960.

Today, tourists are drawn to the art galleries, harbor, marinas, scenery, unusual stores, the view from atop Mount Baldhead, and tourist attractions as well as Oval Beach on Lake Michigan, which enjoys a worldwide reputation and was highlighted as the representative beach for Michigan in a 2026 ranking of U.S. states by the number of natural beaches. Nearby are Saugatuck Dunes State Park and Allegan State Game Area as is the city of Holland. Saugatuck is known as a popular vacation destination for the LGBT+ community with similar cultural attributes as Fire Island Pines and Provincetown, Massachusetts.

== History ==
William C. Butler was the first European-American settler in 1830 of "Kalamazoo village", as it was at first known. He bought land and had a village plat laid out in 1833. In 1836 the legislature gave Kalamazoo, formerly known as Bronson in honor of Titus Bronson, its current name. Thus the community was renamed after the township current name, Newark. The first postmaster suggested the name of Saugatuck, a native American name signifying a stream outlet, for the post office, and this name was taken when Saugatuck was incorporated as a village in 1868 by the County Board of Supervisors. The village was reincorporated by the legislature in its 1869-1870 session.

Its charter was amended in 1893. In 1895, the village came under the village general law for its government. The Saugatuck and Ganges Phone Company was formed for the village in 1893–1894.

In 1968, a hundred years after incorporation as a village, Saugatuck might have looked into incorporating as a city and separating from Saugatuck Township, but it appears incorporation actually happened in 1984, according to historical information on the Saugatuck city website.

== Geography ==
According to the U.S. Census Bureau, the city has a total area of 1.47 square miles (3.81 km^{2}), of which 1.18 square miles (3.06 km^{2}) is land and 0.29 square miles (0.75 km^{2}) is water.

== Tourism ==
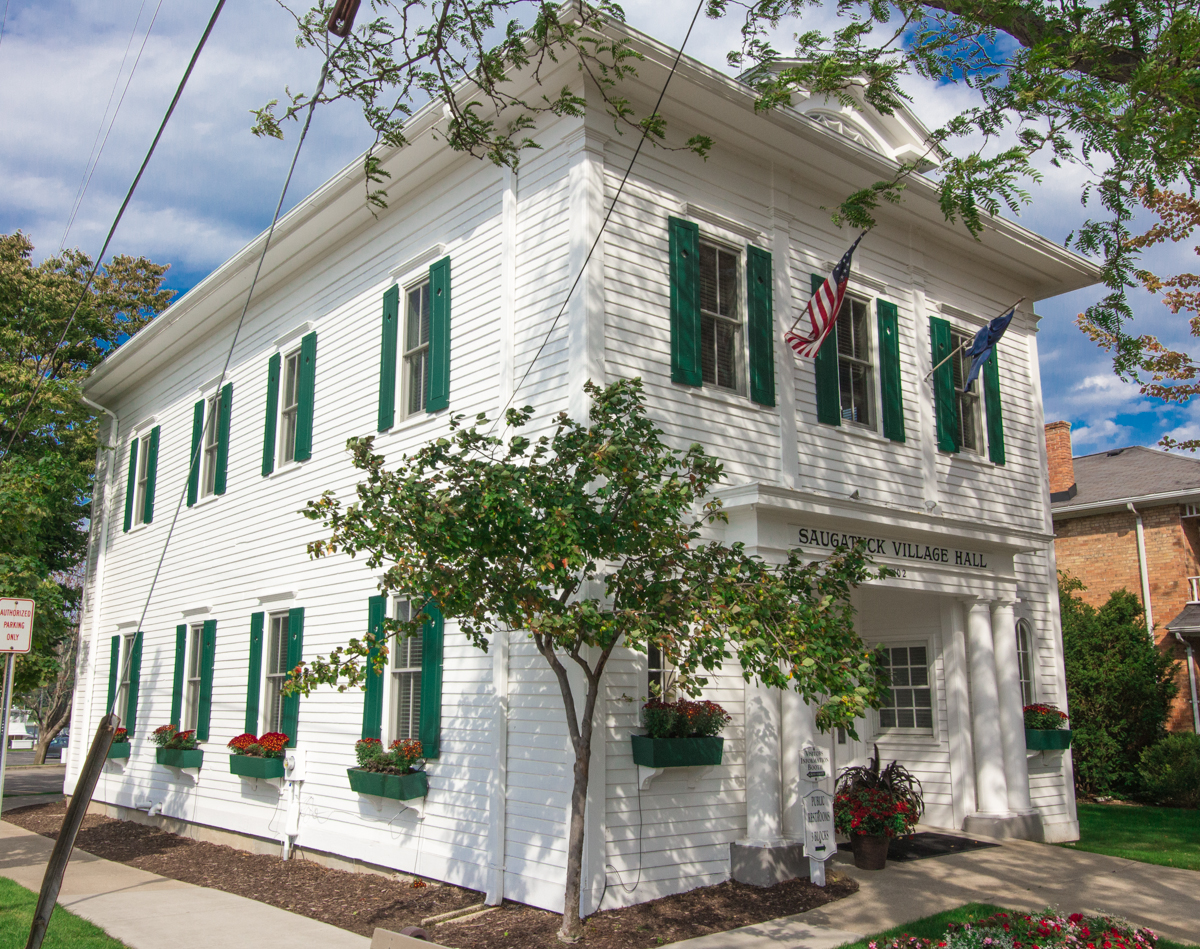
Saugatuck Village Hall

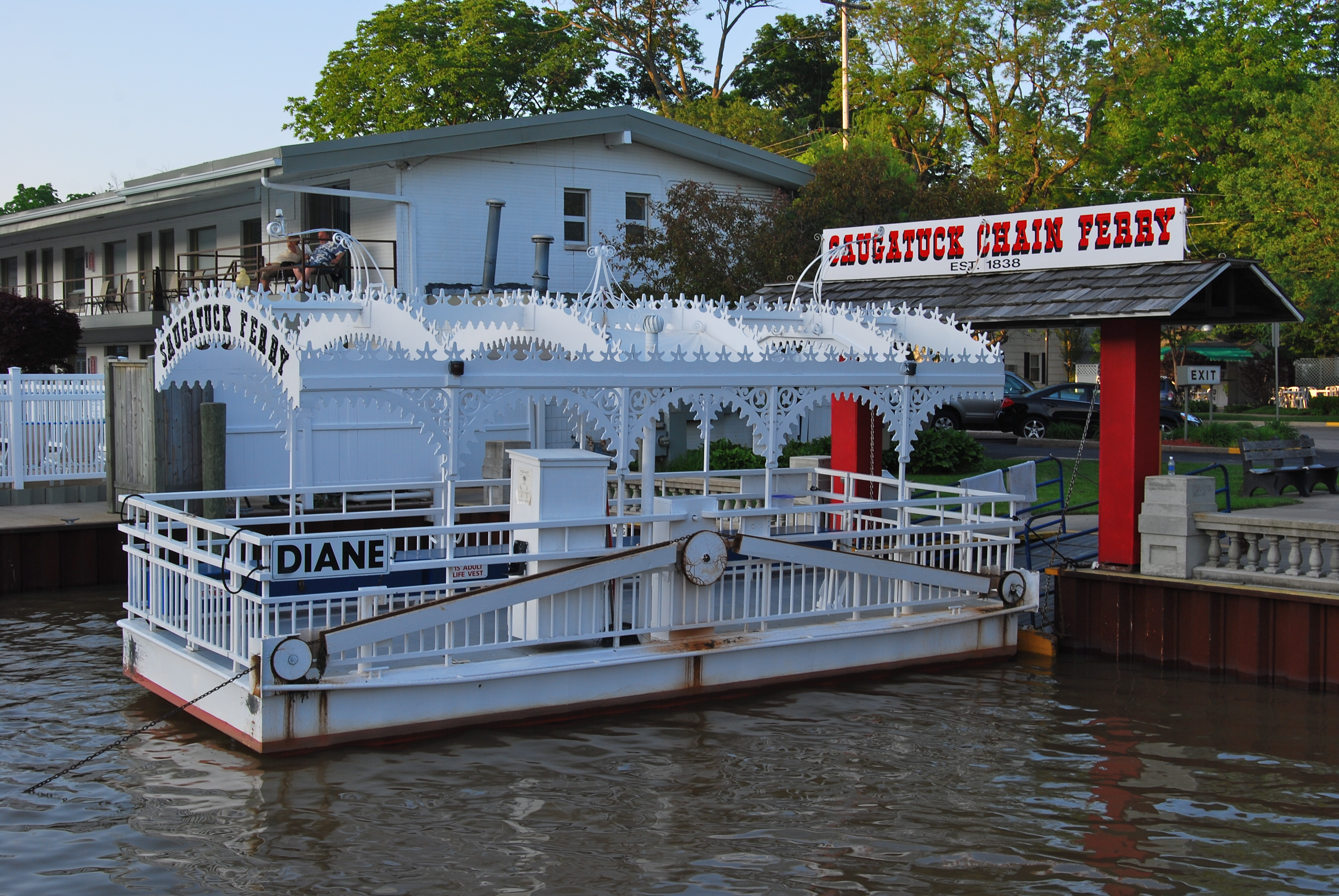
Saugatuck Chain Ferry

Saugatuck's primary source of revenue stems from tourism: although only about 1,000 individuals call Saugatuck their year-round home, the population of the town swells to nearly 3,000 in the summer. Saugatuck is a prime summer weekend getaway destination for residents of Chicago, Grand Rapids, and Detroit areas, some attracted by the many bed and breakfasts in the area. In 2010, Saugatuck came in fourth in Budget Travel magazine's ten coolest towns in America.

In town, attractions include the many art galleries (over a dozen), small, independent shops, and several restaurants. The Star of Saugatuck, a large paddle-wheel boat, gives daily tours of the Kalamazoo River and Lake Michigan. The Saugatuck Chain Ferry, a hand-cranked vessel, departs from Wick's Park and takes tourists from the town side of the river to the other shore for a walk to the beach, the historical museum or to climb the stairs at Mt. Baldhead. In addition to the art and music festivals throughout the year, the Saugatuck Center for the Arts features equity theater, music concerts, art exhibits, educational events, a green market, and is available for event rental.

Other attractions include the nearby town of Douglas, Saugatuck's sister city. Saugatuck's historic churches contribute to a vibrant community while preserving some of the oldest buildings in town. The oldest of these churches is First Congregational Church, founded in 1860. Douglas was home to the SS Keewatin, a coal-fired steamship formerly of the Canadian Pacific Railway. The 105-year-old ship was a floating museum and a fixture in the harbor until it was recently purchased and moved back to Canada.

Since the 1970s, Saugatuck and neighboring Douglas have been popular as a tourist destination for gay and lesbian tourists from the Chicago, Detroit, Milwaukee, Indianapolis, and Grand Rapids areas, as well as other Midwestern urban areas. It has even been nicknamed by some as the Fire Island or Provincetown of the Midwest.

== Demographics ==
Historical population
Census	Pop.	Note	%±
1870	1,026		—
1880	794		−22.6%
1890	799		0.6%
1900	707		−11.5%
1910	621		−12.2%
1920	526		−15.3%
1930	696		32.3%
1940	628		−9.8%
1950	770		22.6%
1960	927		20.4%
1970	1,022		10.2%
1980	1,079		5.6%
1990	954		−11.6%
2000	1,065		11.6%
2010	925		−13.1%
2020	865		−6.5%
U.S. Decennial Census

=== 2010 census ===
As of the census of 2010, there were 925 people, 513 households, and 243 families residing in the city. The population density was 783.9 inhabitants per square mile (302.7/km^{2}). There were 942 housing units at an average density of 798.3 per square mile (308.2/km^{2}). The racial makeup of the city was 95.6% White, 0.6% African American, 0.6% Native American, 0.4% Asian, 0.9% from other races, and 1.8% from two or more races. Hispanic or Latino of any race were 3.8% of the population.

There were 513 households, of which 14.4% had children under the age of 18 living with them, 37.0% were married couples living together, 8.0% had a female householder with no husband present, 2.3% had a male householder with no wife present, and 52.6% were non-families. 43.3% of all households were made up of individuals, and 12.2% had someone living alone who was 65 years of age or older. The average household size was 1.80 and the average family size was 2.43.

The median age in the city was 53.3 years. 12.5% of residents were under the age of 18; 3.7% were between the ages of 18 and 24; 18% were from 25 to 44; 44.2% were from 45 to 64; and 21.6% were 65 years of age or older. The gender makeup of the city was 50.5% male and 49.5% female.

=== 2000 census ===
As of the census of 2000, there were 1,065 people, 549 households, and 265 families residing in the city. The population density was 893.6 inhabitants per square mile (345.0/km^{2}). There were 928 housing units at an average density of 778.7 per square mile (300.7/km^{2}). The racial makeup of the city was 95.21% White, 1.60% African American, 0.38% Native American, 0.94% Asian, 0.09% Pacific Islander, 1.41% from other races, and 0.38% from two or more races. Hispanic or Latino of any race were 4.32% of the population.

There were 549 households, out of which 18.2% had children under the age of 18 living with them, 37.5% were married couples living together, 9.3% had a female householder with no husband present, and 51.7% were non-families. 41.5% of all households were made up of individuals, and 12.0% had someone living alone who was 65 years of age or older. The average household size was 1.93 and the average family size was 2.62.

In the city, the population was spread out, with 16.8% under the age of 18, 7.8% from 18 to 24, 26.6% from 25 to 44, 32.1% from 45 to 64, and 16.7% who were 65 years of age or older. The median age was 44 years. For every 100 females, there were 96.5 males. For every 100 females age 18 and over, there were 96.9 males.

The median income for a household in the city was $44,317, and the median income for a family was $64,582. Males had a median income of $46,160 versus $26,485 for females. The per capita income for the city was $34,382. About 6.7% of families and 11.5% of the population were below the poverty line, including 19.1% of those under age 18 and 5.4% of those age 65 or over.

== Notable people ==
- Albert Henry Krehbiel, most decorated American painter ever at the French Academy
- Aubrey McClendon, businessman
- Blake Dunn, professional baseball outfielder
- Bob Topp, American football player.
- Burr Tillstrom, puppeteer and the creator of Kukla, Fran and Ollie.
- Butch Jones, American football coach
- Dorothy Meredith, artist and educator
- Dorr Felt, inventor and industrialist
- Dulah Marie Evans, painter, photographer, printmaker, illustrator, and etcher.
- Florence Resnikoff, artist and educator
- Francis B. Stockbridge, U.S. Senator in the state of Michigan.
- Frederick F. Fursman, impressionist painter and educator
- Howard Wolpe, politician who served as a seven-term U.S. Representative from Michigan
- Jacob Falconer, congressman
- Jacqueline Carey, writer, primarily of fantasy fiction.
- James F. Boyce, chemist
- LaKela Brown, artist working in sculpture and plaster relief
- Mabel Hewit, woodblock print artist
- Matt Vanderbeek, former professional football player
- Max Kahn, Litvak lithographer, painter and sculptor
- Michael Gallagher (journalist), newspaper editor
- Otis Wells Johnson, manufacturer, banker, and Republican politician.
- Pope Leo XIV, attended nearby St. Augustine Seminary High School
- Rachel Reenstra, comedian, actress, and wildlife conservationist
- Ray Johnson, artist
- Sandra Bartky, professor of philosophy and gender studies
- Scott Baker (racing driver), professional stock car racing driver

== See also ==
- Navigation Structures at Saugatuck Harbor
- Saugatuck Dunes State Park
