= Kalamazoo River =

River in Michigan

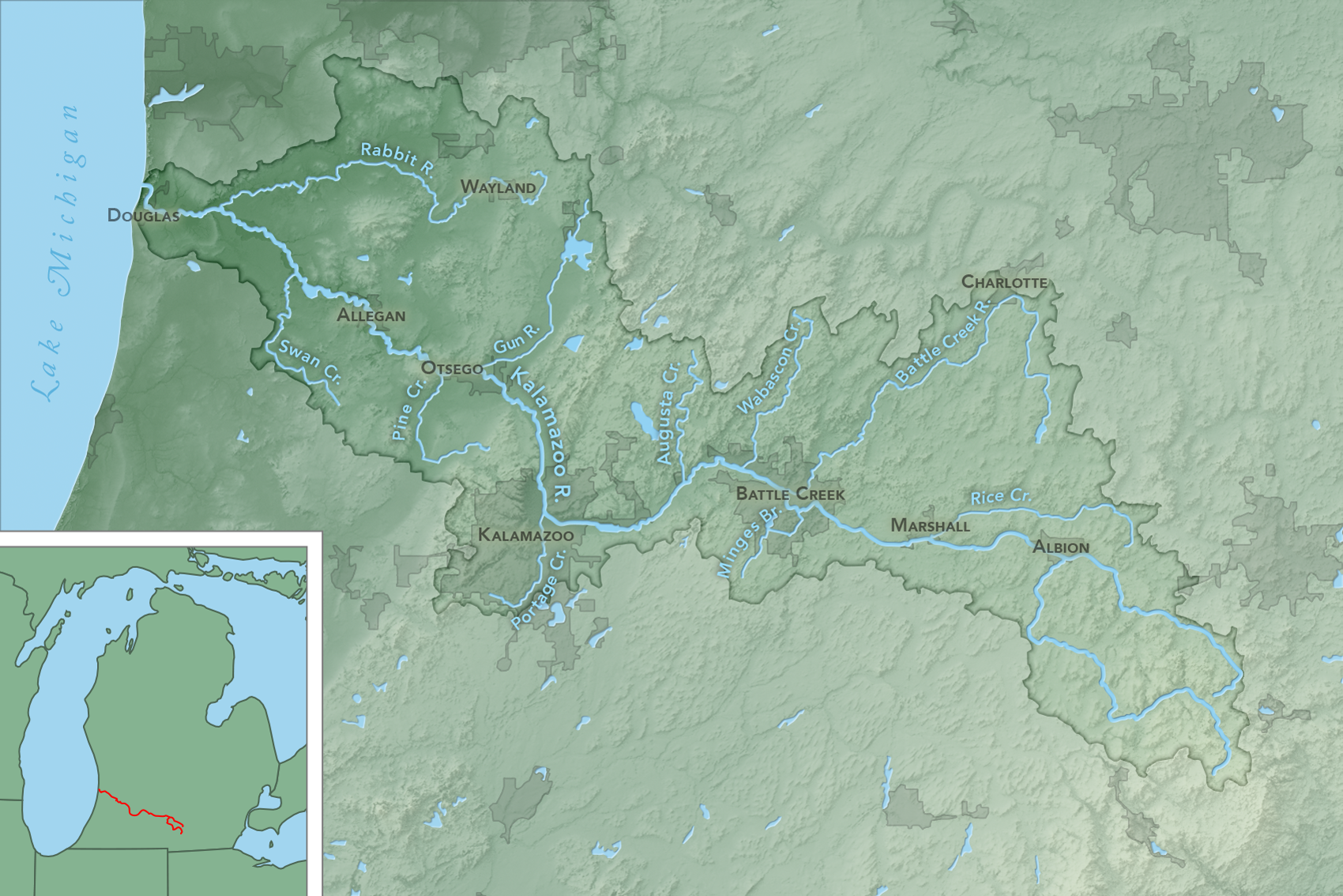
- Map of the Kalamazoo River watershed

Physical characteristics
- Source
  - location: South Branch: near North Adams
  - coordinates: 41.98476°N 84.51633°W; North Branch: near Farewell and Pine Hills lakes, Jackson County; 42.09643°N 84.47717°W
- Mouth
  - location: Lake Michigan
  - coordinates: 42.67669°N 86.21531°W
- Length: 130 mi (210 km)
- Basin size: 5,230 km^{2} (2,020 sq mi)
- Discharge
  - average: Marshall: 9.1 m^{3}/s (320 cu ft/s); Battle Creek: 19.4 m^{3}/s (690 cu ft/s); Comstock: 26.5 m^{3}/s (940 cu ft/s); Allegan : 45.8 m^{3}/s (1,620 cu ft/s); New Richmond: 52.8 m^{3}/s (1,860 cu ft/s)

The Kalamazoo River (/ˌkæləməˈzuː/ KAL-ə-mə-ZOO) is a river in the U.S. state of Michigan. The river is 130 miles (210 km) long from the junction of its north and south branches to its mouth at Lake Michigan, with a total length extending to 178 miles (286 km) when one includes the South Branch. The river's watershed drains an area of approximately 2,020 square miles (5,200 km^{2}) and drains portions of ten counties in southwest Michigan: Allegan, Barry, Eaton, Van Buren, Kalamazoo, Calhoun, Jackson, Hillsdale, Kent, and Ottawa. The river has a median flow of 1,863 cubic feet per second (52.8 m^{3}/s) at New Richmond, upstream from its mouth at Saugatuck and Douglas.

The north and south branches of the Kalamazoo River originate within a few miles of each other. The south branch begins near North Adams in Moscow Township in northeastern Hillsdale County and flows north and west through Homer before joining the north branch at the forks of the Kalamazoo River in Albion. The North Branch begins near Farwell and Pine Hills lakes in southern Jackson County and flows north and west through Concord before reaching Albion in Calhoun County. It then flows through Kalamazoo and Allegan counties.

After Albion, the Kalamazoo flows mostly westward through Marshall, Battle Creek, Augusta, Galesburg, Comstock, and Kalamazoo. From Kalamazoo, the river flows mostly north until just before it reaches Plainwell and then flows northwest through Otsego, Allegan, Saugatuck and then into Lake Michigan.

Some of the larger tributaries of the Kalamazoo are Rice Creek, Wilder Creek, Wabascon Creek, Battle Creek River, Augusta Creek, Portage Creek, Gun River, Swan Creek, and Rabbit River.

== History ==
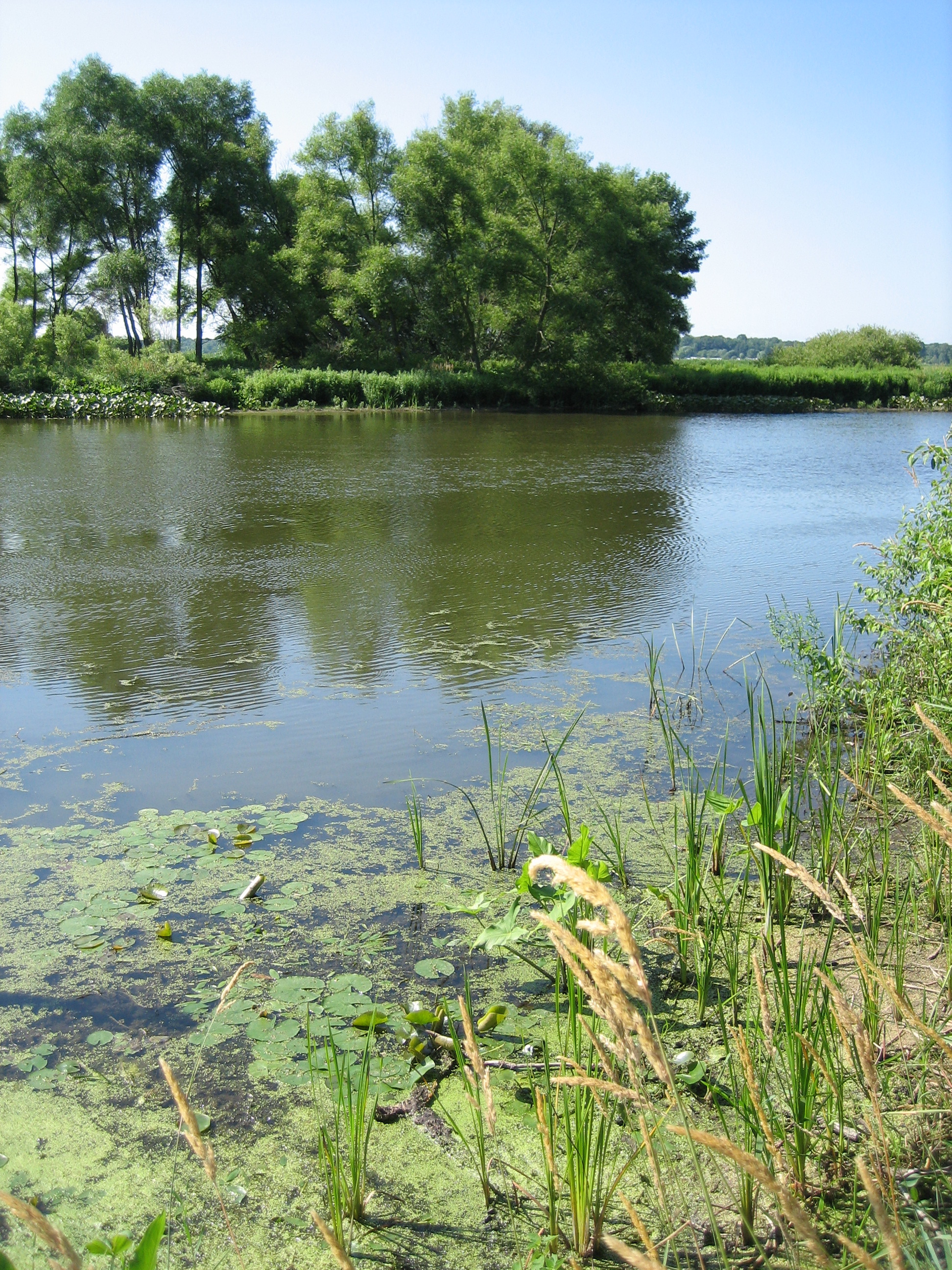
The Kalamazoo River at Saugatuck, Michigan

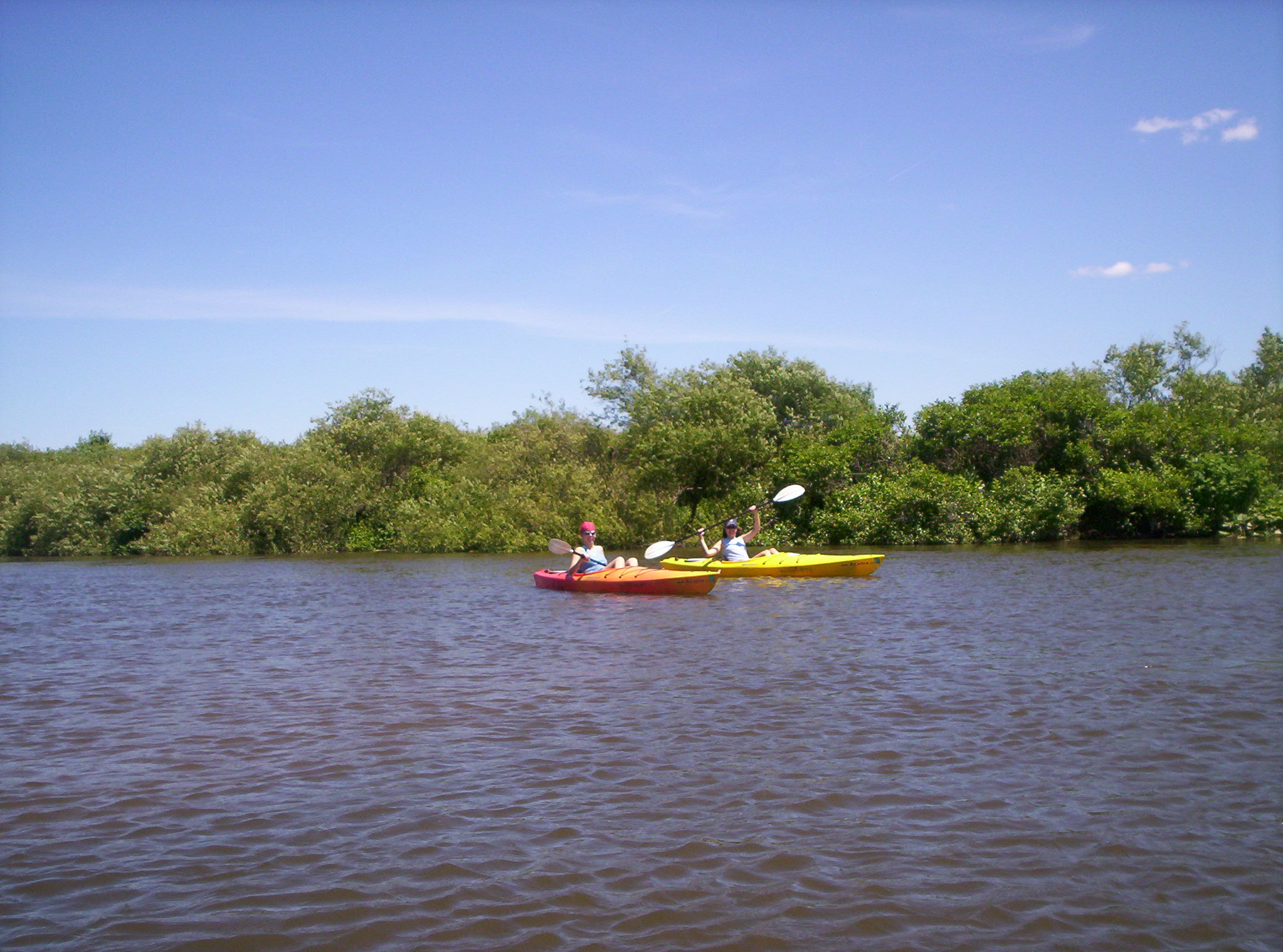
Kayakers on the Kalamazoo River

Archeological evidence indicates humans have used the Kalamazoo River basin continuously for more than 11,000 years. At the time of European contact, the Kalamazoo River area was inhabited primarily by members of Potawatomi tribes. The Jesuit priest Father Jacques Marquette and his companions were probably the first Europeans to glimpse the mouth of the Kalamazoo in 1675 as they returned from Illinois. It wasn't until the late eighteenth century that the area was frequented by fur traders. By the early nineteenth century, there were several small communities along the river, including Kalamazoo. With the introduction of the railroad in the 1840s, the importance of the river for transportation diminished.

By the mid-19th century, several communities had grown up along the River as mill towns and commercial centers: Battle Creek, Kalamazoo, Parchment, Plainwell, and Otsego. After the Civil War and into the 20th century, various industries, from cereal production to pharmaceuticals to automobile parts, flourished. Several communities became sites for paper production, which used the river for water intake and waste discharge. Deinking practices no longer in use led to PCB contamination of the river. Sewage effluent, other industrial discharges, and trash also contributed to the pollution of the river. For many years in the 1940s to 1960s, the river was an "eyesore" and most people did their best to avoid it. Beginning in the 1970s with the federal Clean Water Act, serious efforts were made to clean up the river. Although today the river is cleaner, the persistent PCB contamination has led to Superfund designation of a 35-mile (56 km) section from Kalamazoo to Allegan Dam. Many species of fish inhabit the river, including smallmouth bass, largemouth bass, catfish, carp, and many types of panfish. Though populations have increased in recent years due to the cleanup of the river, it is still advised for people to not eat large amounts of fish from the Kalamazoo River, and pregnant women are also advised not to eat any fish from the river due to lingering effects of the pollution in the diets of many fish (particularly bottom feeding fish like catfish which can accumulate high levels of mercury).

In the late 1950s, a developer at the North Branch headwaters (Farwell and Pinehill Lakes) was allowed to build a dam which raised the level of both of those lakes so that he might operate a commercial marina. The dam caused soil sediments to enter the lake through the raised water level and resultant erosion. The residents of Farwell Lake have been working to restore the quality of that lake. A municipal area sewer system branch has been added, in addition to efforts to educate lake users about keeping fuel, lawn chemicals, and fertilizers, etc. out of the water. The property owners are hopeful that the dam will be removed and that would allow the headwaters to flow naturally again and restore the lake to its natural sandy shoreline.

Although the word Kalamazoo appears to be Native American in origin, the exact meaning is obscure and various definitions have been suggested.

== Kalamazoo River oil spill ==
On 26 July 2010, an Enbridge Energy pipeline leaked more than 1 million US gallons (3,800 m^{3}) of tar sands also known as dilbit into Talmadge Creek that flows into the Kalamazoo, initially causing two homes to be evacuated, and prohibitions against fishing and swimming to be posted. The US Environmental Protection Agency (EPA) later estimated the spill to be in excess of 1 million gallons. On 29 July 2010, the Calhoun County Health Department asked 30 to 50 households to evacuate, and twice as many were advised not to drink their water. The National Transportation Safety Board stated the Enbridge oil spill is the costliest onshore cleanup in U.S. history.

== Dams ==
Following is a list of major dams on the Kalamazoo River. The Plainwell Dam was removed in 2009.

Name	Height	Purpose(s)	Capacity (MW)	Year	Owner name	Reservoir name	Coordinates	Comments
Lake Allegan (Calkins Bridge)	33 ft (10.1 m)	Hydroelectric	2.5	1930	Consumers Energy	Lake Allegan	42.56369°N 85.9536°W	
Allegan City	12 ft (3.7 m)	Retired hydroelectric		1900	City of Allegan		42.52493°N 85.84576°W	
Trowbridge	11 ft (3.4 m)	Retired hydroelectric		1899	Michigan DNR		42.4828°N 85.7964°W	
Otsego	5 ft (1.5 m)	Retired hydroelectric		1904	Michigan DNR		42.46492°N 85.74965°W	Also known as Otsego Township Dam. Removed 2015-2016 and replaced by a temporary structure, which itself was removed in 2018.
Otsego City	9 ft (2.7 m)	Retired hydroelectric		1886	City of Otsego		42.4632°N 85.6923°W	
Morrow	14 ft (4.3 m)	Hydroelectric	.9	1941	STS Hydropower	Morrow Lake	42.2826°N 85.4918°W	
Monroe Street	12 ft (3.7 m)	Retired hydroelectric		1894	City of Battle Creek	Lower Mill Pond	42.3128°N 85.18531°W	
Ceresco	15 ft (4.6 m)	Retired hydroelectric		1906			42.27001°N 85.06081°W	Dam has been removed
Marshall	14 ft (4.3 m)	Hydroelectric	0.319	1890	City of Marshall		42.26269°N 84.95421°W	
Albion	7 ft (2.1 m)	Retired hydroelectric		1856	City of Albion		42.23911°N 84.7494°W	
Concord	9 ft (2.7 m)	Recreation		1830			42.18038°N 84.64627°W	
Total			3.72					

== See also ==
- Kalamazoo Superfund Site
- Kalamazoo Lake
