= 1956 Saugatuck–Holland tornado =

1956 tornado in Michigan, U.S.

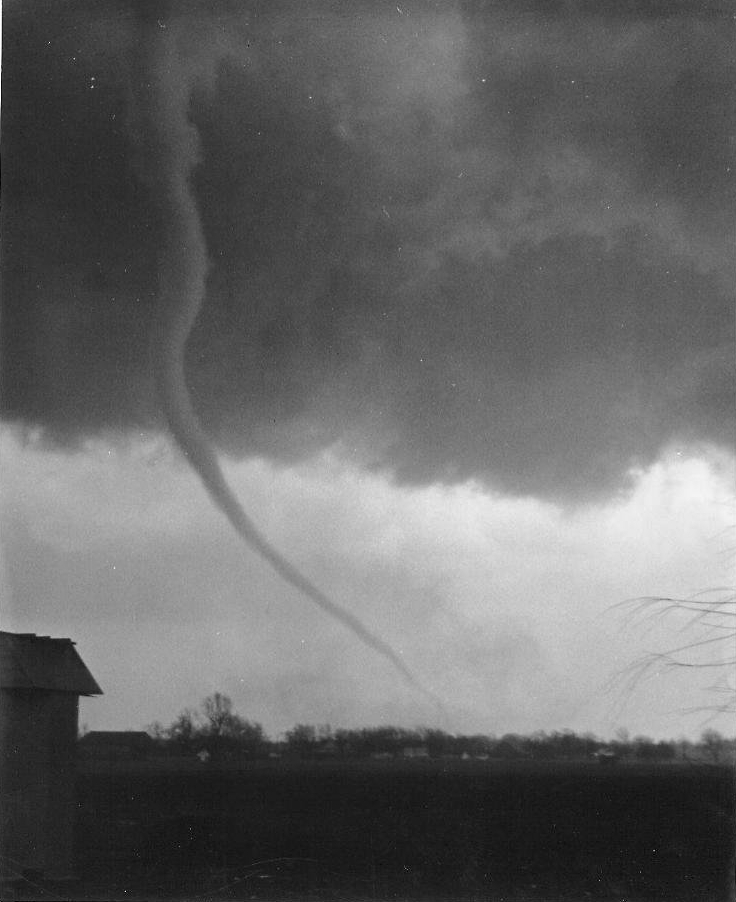
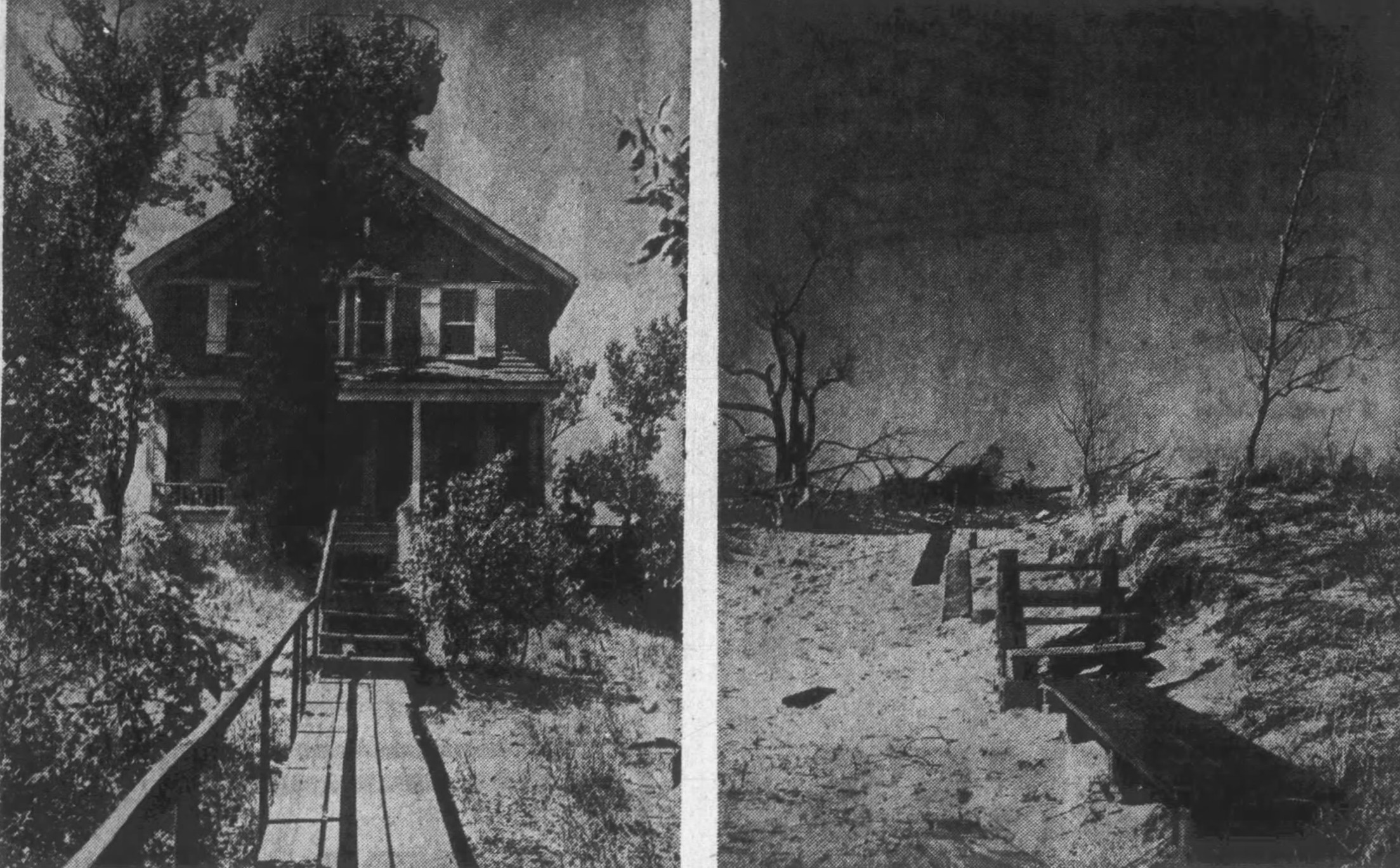
- Top Image: The Saugatuck–Holland tornado in its eighth mile, as seen near the unincorporated community of Graafschap, Michigan; Bottom Image: The historic Kalamazoo River Lighthouse before and after the tornado.

Meteorological history
- Formed: April 3, 1956, 5.40 p.m. CST (UTC–06:00) (Note: Some sources suggest that the Saugatuck–Holland tornado may have formed at 5:45 p.m., though various research papers and damage reports confirm that the formation time was closer to 5:40.)
- Dissipated: April 3, 1956, 6:00 p.m. CST (UTC–06:00)
- Duration: 20 minutes

F4 tornado
- on the Fujita scale
- Max width: 100 yd (91 m)
- Path length: 9 mi (14 km)
- Highest winds: 207–260 mph (333–418 km/h)

Overall effects
- Fatalities: 0
- Injuries: 7
- Damage: Unknown
- Areas affected: Laketown Township, Michigan; particularly Saugatuck, Graafschap, and Holland, Michigan
- Part of the Tornado outbreak of April 2–3, 1956 and Tornadoes of 1956

Amid a widespread and potent tornado outbreak extending from the Great Plains to the Great Lakes region, an F4 tornado tracked a total of 9 mi (14 km) throughout Western Michigan in the evening hours of April 3, 1956, impacting the greater Saugatuck–Douglas area, the unincorporated community of Graafschap, and the outskirts of Holland, Michigan – all of which are contained in Laketown Township. Though this tornado did not cause any fatalities, it injured seven people (Note: It is worth remembering that "injuries" can refer to debilitating, life-altering injuries, and not simply minor cuts or scrapes.) and completely swept multiple homes along the Lake Michigan coast.

Most notable about this tornado is the fact that it fully destroyed a near-century-old, frame lighthouse at the mouth of the Kalamazoo River; this lighthouse had been in operation from 1859-1914, and had been well-maintained since by various keepers until the time of the tornado. This lighthouse is best-known as the Kalamazoo River Lighthouse, though some official NCEI summaries refer to the lighthouse as the "historic Saugatuck Lighthouse". The damage to this lighthouse was rated F4.

The Saugatuck–Holland tornado, as it is commonly known, was thought to be part of the path of an F5 tornado from the same supercell, which impacted the western Grand Rapids area. However, in recent times, this has been disproven. This tornado had a maximum width of 100 yd (91 m), unusual for a tornado of this intensity.

== Meteorological synopsis ==
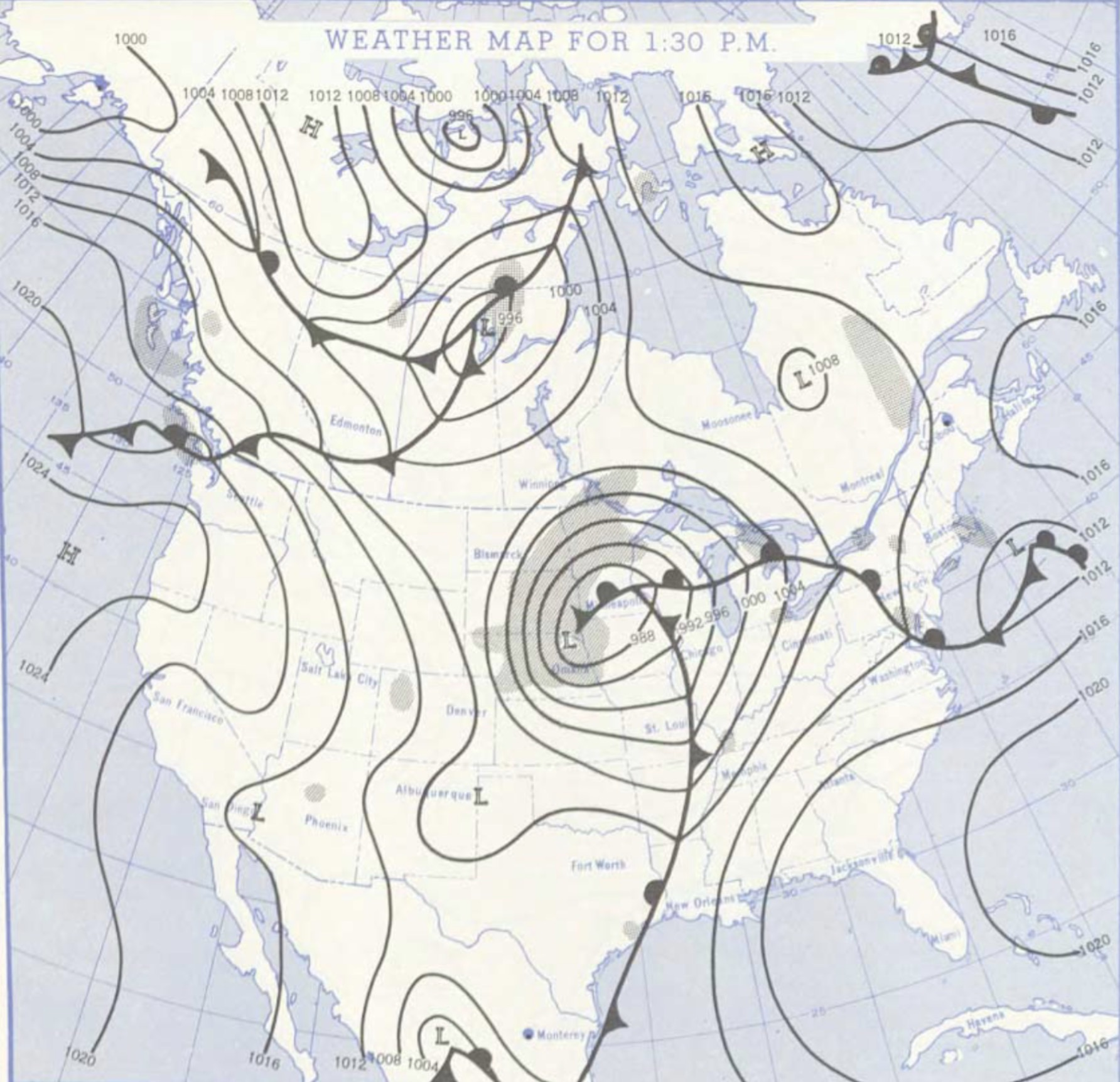
The low-pressure system associated with the Western Michigan tornadoes on April 3, 1956, as it appeared at 1:30 p.m. local time.

April 3, 1956 was an unseasonably warm and humid day, both in terms of the early spring environment of Western Michigan, and the expected influence of Lake Michigan, which usually advects cold air onto the shore. From a climatological standpoint, the environmental conditions for Western Michigan on April 3, 1956 were very rare. These high temperature and dew point values, however, were driven by a deep low-pressure system that was quickly enclosing the region, with a warm front extending to the east and a cold front extending to the south. At the time, this system set a record-high temperature for the city of Grand Rapids on April 3, where a temperature of 78 °F (26 °C) was recorded. Dew points exceeded 60 °F (16 °C) in the region. Across Northern Illinois, dew points dropped sharply, indicating the presence of a deep, well-mixed dry line; this dry air had likely been advected from the Southwest by the vigorously-sheared atmosphere. A full-latitude trough and an extremely intense jet stream accompanied this area of low pressure, with a radiosonde-observed wind of 135 kt (69 m s⁻¹) being recorded at Little Rock, Arkansas.

== Tornado summary ==
=== Formation over Lake Michigan & track into Oval Beach ===
Forming as a tornadic waterspout over Lake Michigan, the Saugatuck–Holland tornado quickly emerged ashore as a slender, rope-like tornado. The first building complex impacted was Camp Gray, a Presbyterian summer campsite. A group of Campfire Girls had been at this site only a few hours before in the early afternoon, but the extreme winds that accompanied the storm system on April 3, 1956 prevented the group from lighting a campfire, causing them to leave. Various buildings were severely damaged at Camp Gray, including the multi-story Stoughton Hall, the main building at the campsite. Continuing northeast, the tornado entered the Oval Beach area and significantly damaged a beach house, unroofing it and shifting it from its foundation. A concession stand at Oval Beach, the Oval Beach Refreshment House, was also destroyed.

=== Destruction of the historic Saugatuck lighthouse ===
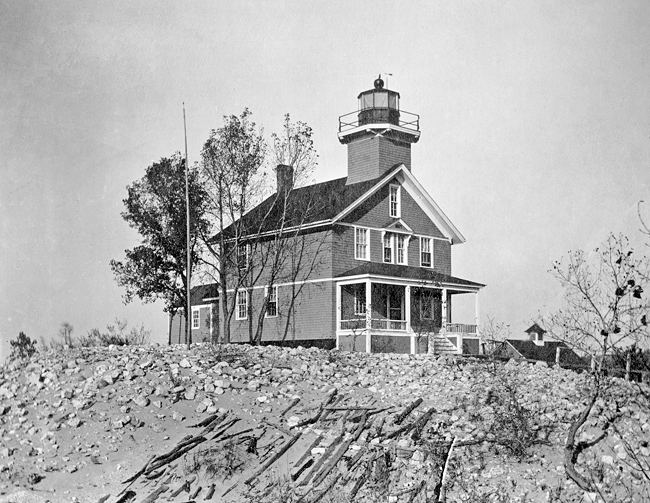
The Kalamazoo River Lighthouse, just prior to being discontinued in October of 1914.

The tornado then approached the mouth of the Kalamazoo River, where a nearly-century-old lighthouse stood. Commonly known as the Kalamazoo River Lighthouse, or the "old Lighthouse" to locals, this structure was constructed in 1859, after a previous lighthouse was demolished due to an erosion of sand beneath the foundation, which had caused it to collapse. The historic Saugatuck Lighthouse was in operation until 1914 and received various modifications during its time in service, including the addition of a cellar beneath part of the lighthouse and the installation of a cistern and pump. When it was discontinued on October 6, 1914, the lantern room was removed from the building. From 1914 until its destruction, the lighthouse housed many tenants and was generally well-maintained. One professor of architecture, who had used the lighthouse as a summer home, described it as a "well-constructed frame building, similar in structural integrity to homes of the historic colonial period".

The lighthouse was completely destroyed, with the main structure being thrown 60 ft (18 m) and found overturned, and other debris being ejected as far away as 200 ft (61 m). The lighthouse itself featured 12 iron rods (3 per wall) installed into the foundation, equipped with iron pylons and bolted to wooden sills at the base of the brick-and-mortar foundation. Upon the failure of the lighthouse, all 12 pylons were either dislodged or completely removed (snapped, uprooted) from the foundation. This lighthouse was given an F4 rating, and would likely qualify for an EF4 rating through the "one or two family residences" damage indicator outlined by McDonald et al. 2006.

=== Gibson & Graafschap ===
The next building to be struck by the tornado was the David Bennett estate, which was being maintained by the father of Eugene Schoeneich in the Spring of 1956. It lay on the north side of the Kalamazoo River, on a bluff approximately 90 ft (27 m) up from the river. As Eugene Schoeneich recounted, he saw a plume of whirling debris, including a screen door, quickly approaching the large Bennett estate. Realizing this was unnatural, Eugene pulled his father from the kitchen window, and the two watched as a large tree on the property — which Eugene estimated was 4 ft (1.2 m) in diameter — was uprooted and lofted by the tornado, pulling up the cement of the Bennett estate's driveway with it. This was the only damage to the property. Seeing as the tree was directly impacted by the tornado and was approximately 30 ft (9.1 m) north of the Bennett Estate, the tornado missed the house by this distance.

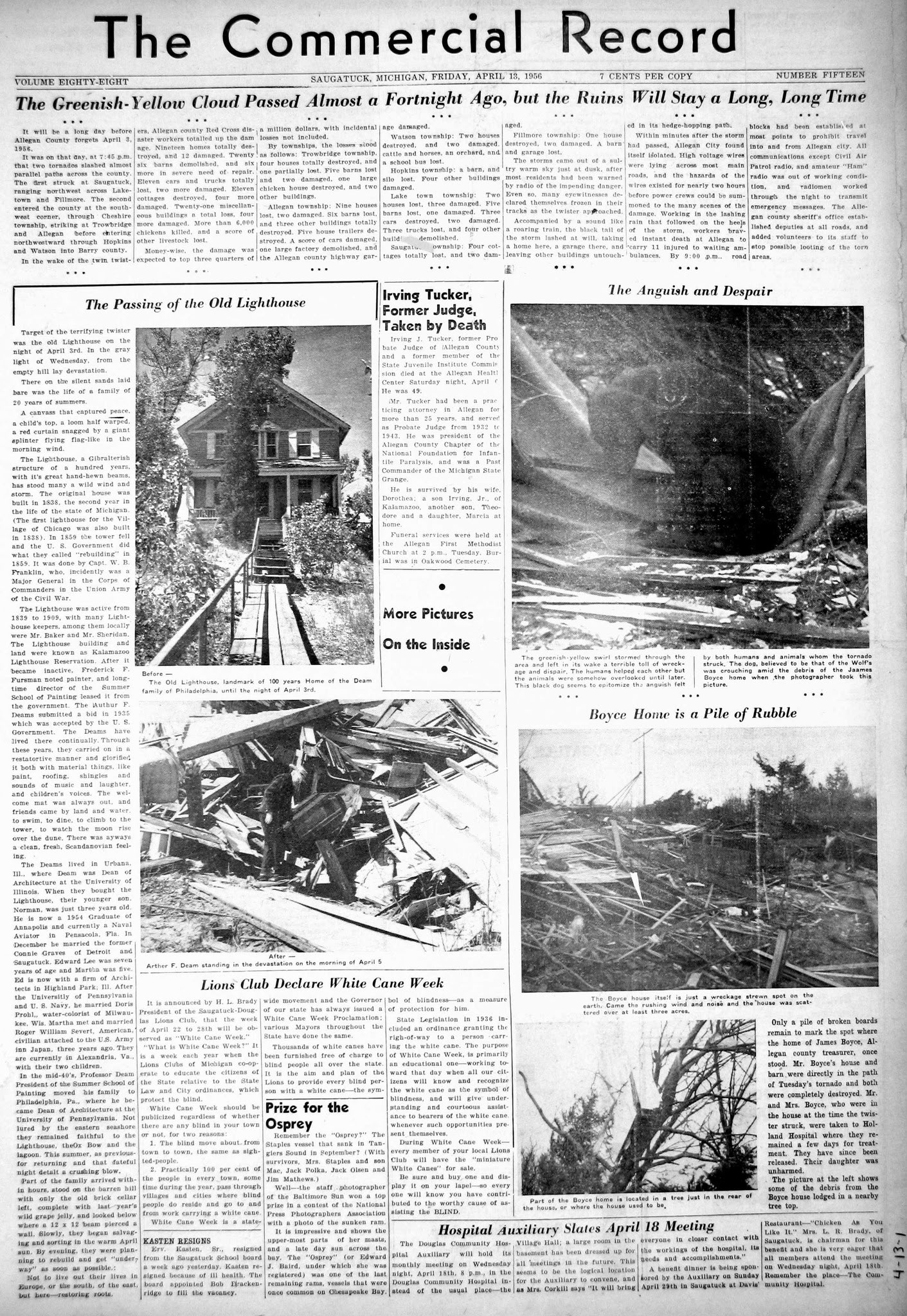
The April 13, 1956 issue of The Commercial Record, detailing various instances of damage from the Saugatuck–Holland tornado. This includes the destruction of the historic Saugatuck lighthouse and the destruction of the Boyce home.

Shortly thereafter, the Saugatuck–Holland tornado reached the unincorporated community of Gibson, north of Saugatuck, where the Boyce home was struck. Jim Boyce, along with his wife, Ruth, and youngest daughter, Patti, attempted to seek shelter in the basement of the home upon hearing the roar of the tornado. However, they failed to reach the basement, as the entire home around them was demolished. Several shelves of canning jars in the cellar of the home were shattered, various large maple trees on the property were uprooted and pulled in the direction of the tornado, a piano was smashed, three cars were blown downstream, and the Boyce home and a barn were destroyed and windrowed. All of the pin curls in Patti's hair were plucked by the tornado, a cooking fork was driven so soundly into an apple tree that it could not be removed by Jim Boyce, and despite the destruction, a box of Christmas ornaments in the home remained completely untouched. At least one occupant was injured. According to Patti Boyce, 50 ft (15 m)-tall maple trees were forcefully twisted out of the ground, exposing the roots underneath, blades of grass were driven into trees, and stationery from the home was found 60 mi (97 km) away in a person's yard.

South of the unincorporated community of Graafschap, the Wolf home was destroyed, injuring two. The Van Kampen home was pelted with debris from destroyed outbuildings. Various windows were blown out, including the basement window near where the Van Kampens were sheltering, but no occupants were seriously injured. Along 61st St. in Graafschap, Michigan, the tornado struck the Rivulet Hurst Dairy Farm, causing damage estimated in the thousands and destroying multiple barns on site. Numerous other buildings and farms in Graafschap were damaged.

=== Holland, Zeeland, and dissipation ===
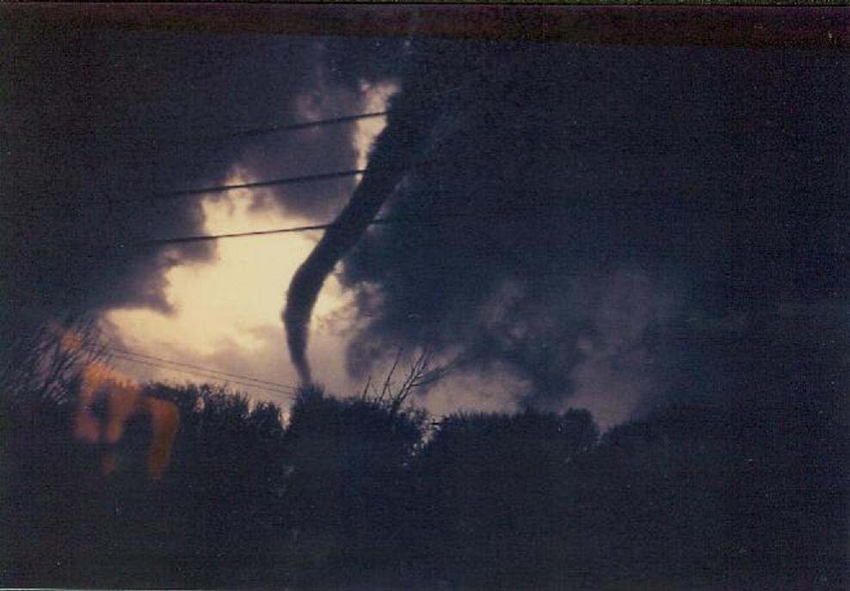
The Saugatuck–Holland tornado, shortly before dissipation in south Holland.

Crossing through Washington Ave. in Holland, the Saugatuck–Holland tornado struck the two-story Modder's Plumbing building, blowing in plate glass windows and carrying steel tubs approximately a block from the building. The tornado dissipated shortly thereafter, and multiple witnesses in Zeeland watched as it receded into the storm. Some witnesses in the Holland–Zeeland region even experienced the debris fallout of the tornado, noting that various objects, such as cans and bottles, could be found strewn around the area.

== Aftermath ==
=== Statistics ===
The completely destroyed Wolf home between Gibson and Graafschap, following the Saugatuck–Holland tornado.

The Saugatuck–Holland tornado tracked a total of 9 mi (14 km) in approximately 20 minutes, giving the tornado an average forward speed of 27 mph (43 km/h). (Note: Calculated through s = d/t, in which d = 9 mi (14 km) and t = 20 min. (20/60 minutes).) Throughout the course of the tornado's path, no fatalities were reported, but seven were injured. Though no official damage figures exist for the Saugatuck–Holland tornado, initial estimates suggest that damage costs could have exceeded $750,000 (1956 USD). The Saugatuck–Holland tornado was the first violent (F4+) tornado to occur in the Western Michigan region since official documentation began in 1950. The maximum width of the tornado was estimated at a mere 100 yd (91 m) wide, unusual, but certainly not impossible, for a tornado of this intensity.

=== Legacy ===
==== Rebuilding & "What if?" ====
Following the tornado, various injured people were admitted to hospitals in Grand Rapids, Holland, and Zeeland. Both the Red Cross and the Salvation Army facilitated cleanup and evacuation in the region, providing much-needed supplies to the affected, such as food, clothing, and temporary housing. The rebuilding of the community was swift, but psychological effects lingered in the impacted towns, expressed in the various eyewitness accounts from the Saugatuck–Holland tornado. Questions have long since persisted regarding the idea: what if these tornadoes were to happen today? With this question in mind, the National Weather Service office in Grand Rapids has made significant improvements in how they operate and warn citizens.

==== Reconstructing the Kalamazoo River Lighthouse ====
Following the tornado, Arthur Deam, who had maintained the building for several years, salvaged various structural components from the historic Saugatuck lighthouse. These components included porch railings, six-paneled doors, newel posts, beams and other elements from the original lighthouse's foundation, and a placard containing the original construction year (1859). All of these elements were incorporated into the new lighthouse, which was erected on the foundation of the previous one. The newly-constructed lighthouse presently sits at 3530 Oval Dr. in the Old Saugatuck area. As long as 50 years after the tornado, the remains of the previous lighthouse, including wooden frames, scattered brick masonry, and iron pylons with bent iron rods, could be found at the site.

=== Other tornadoes ===
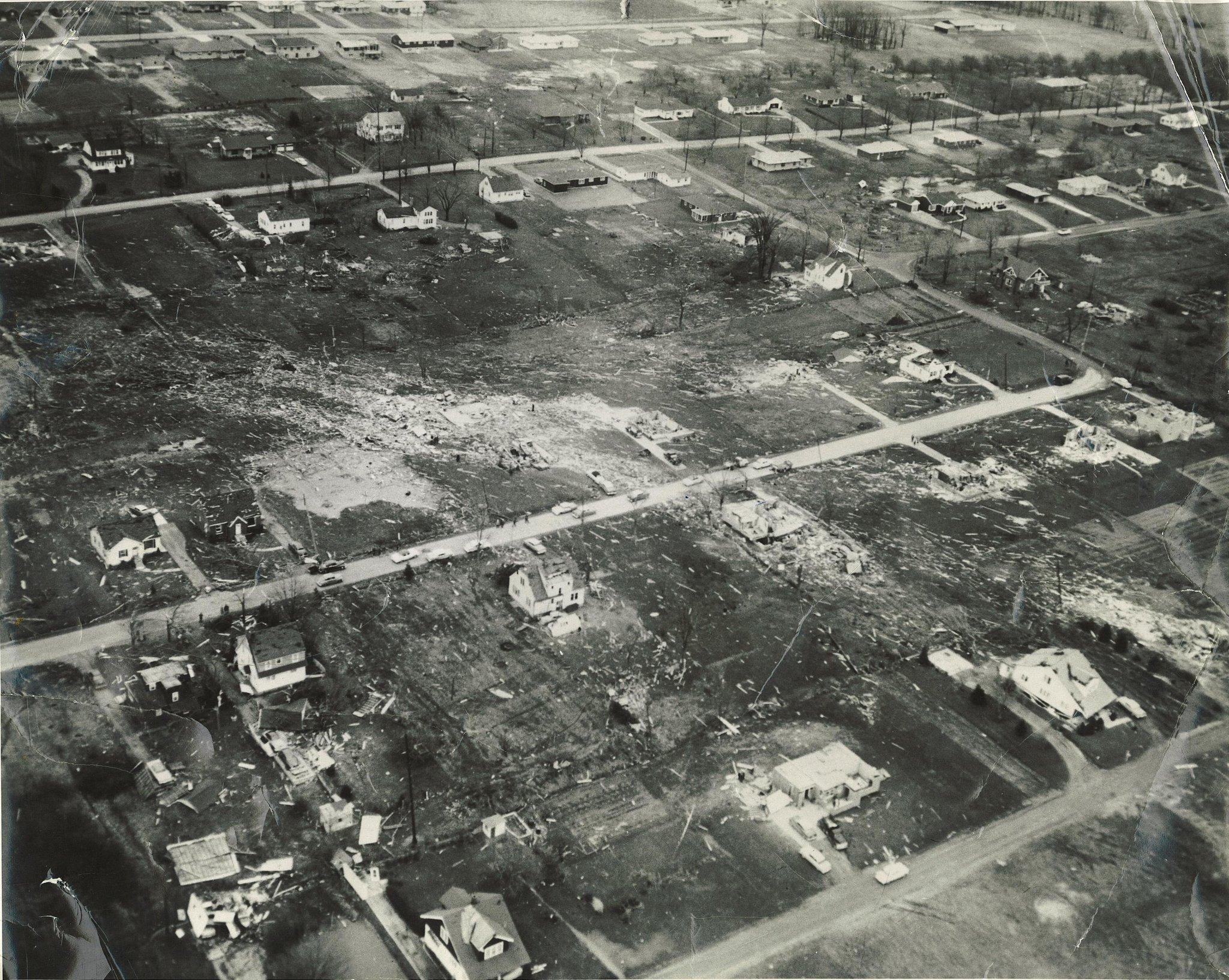
Extensive damage to a suburban development in Walker, Michigan, following the Hudsonville–Standale tornado.

After the Saugatuck–Holland tornado dissipated near Zeeland, the supercell that produced the tornado continued to the northeast and quickly resurged in intensity, dropping a tornado to the northeast of the unincorporated community of Vriesland. This tornado was the strongest and most fatal of the outbreak sequence, killing 17 and injuring 340 as it moved through the Grand Rapids metropolitan area. Some of the worst-impacted areas were Hudsonville, the business suburb of Standale, Walker, and Comstock Park, Michigan. This tornado, retroactively rated F5 on the Fujita scale, is the most recent F5 tornado in Michigan history, and was the first tornado of estimated F5 intensity to be videographed. During this sequence, another F4 tornado tracked from Portage Point to Grand Traverse Bay in the Northern Michigan region.

== See also ==
- 1956 Hudsonville–Standale tornado — An F5 tornado produced from the same supercell as the Saugatuck–Holland tornado; this tornado happens to be the most recent F5 tornado in Michigan history, as well as the first videographed F5 tornado
- 1965 Palm Sunday tornado outbreak — A tornado outbreak that featured various violent tornadoes in Michigan, including an F4 tornado that struck Comstock Park, Michigan
- 2007 Elie tornado — A similarly thin but extremely intense F5 tornado that impacted the town of Elie, Manitoba on June 22, 2007
- Tornadoes of 1956
- Tornado outbreak of April 2–3, 1956
- List of F4, EF4, and IF4 tornadoes
- List of F4 tornadoes (1950–1959)
- List of Michigan tornadoes
