= Tornado outbreak of April 2–3, 1956 =

Tornado outbreak in the central United States

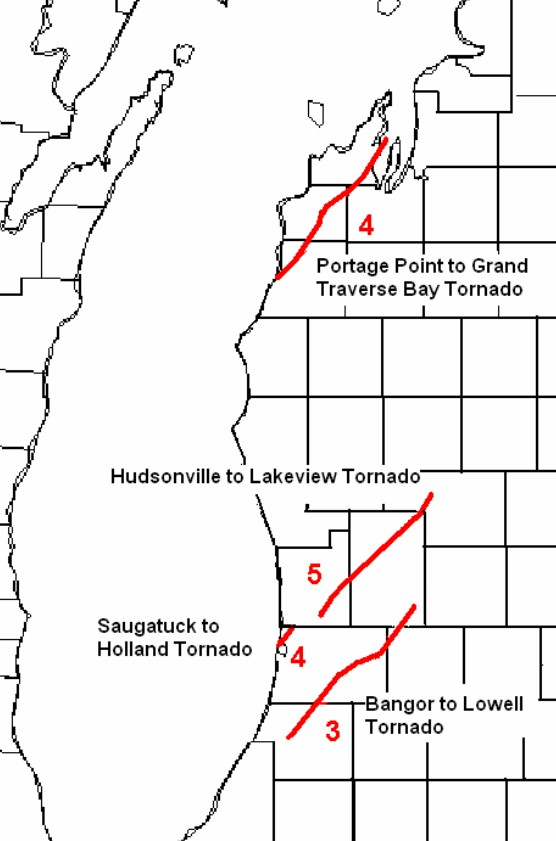
- A map of the tornadoes in western Michigan on April 3.

Tornado outbreak
- Tornadoes: 55
- Max. rating: F5 tornado
- Duration: April 2–3, 1956

Overall effects
- Fatalities: 39
- Injuries: 790
- Damage: ≥ $8,035,530 ($95,160,000 in 2025 USD)
- Areas affected: Central United States
- Part of the tornadoes and tornado outbreaks of 1956

From April 2–3, 1956, a large, deadly tornado outbreak affected the Great Plains, parts of the South, and the upper Midwest in the contiguous United States, especially the Great Lakes region. The outbreak produced at least 55 tornadoes, including an F5 that devastated the Grand Rapids metropolitan area in the U.S. state of Michigan on April 3. It was one of three tornadoes to move across southwest Lower Michigan on that day. A fourth tornado struck north of the Manistee area, in the northern part of the peninsula. The Hudsonville–Standale tornado killed 17 and injured 333. It remains the fourth deadliest tornado on record in Michigan and is the most recent F5 on record there. Several other deadly, intense, long-tracked tornadoes also occurred during the outbreak. In addition to the fatalities in Kansas, Oklahoma, Michigan and Berlin, Wisconsin, three people were killed in Tennessee, one person in Kentucky and two more people in Wisconsin. In total, 39 were killed during the entire event. (Note: An outbreak is generally defined as a group of at least six tornadoes (the number sometimes varies slightly according to local climatology) with no more than a six-hour gap between individual tornadoes. An outbreak sequence, prior to (after) the start of modern records in 1950, is defined as a period of no more than two (one) consecutive days without at least one significant (F2 or stronger) tornado.)

== Background ==
Tuesday, April 3, 1956, was a warm and humid day across most of the Midwestern U.S., the Great Lakes and the Ohio Valley. Temperatures in the areas affected by the worst of the outbreak were well into the 70s °F, approaching 80 °F (27 °C) in Michigan, with anomalously high dew points—the latter exceeding 60 °F (16 °C) near the shoreline of Lake Michigan. A potent low-pressure area accompanied an intense mid-latitude cyclone with a pronounced dry line located near the western Great Lakes. An attendant warm front extended eastward over Wisconsin, a vigorous cold front southward through Illinois. In tandem with the advancing trough, a strong jet stream with winds up to 135 kn (155 mph; 250 km/h) extended over Little Rock, Arkansas, and impinged on the Upper Midwest. Prior to the arrival of the storms in the region, schools had closed earlier than usual due to the threat of severe weather. By late afternoon, the cold front crossed over the western Great Lakes including Lake Michigan.

== Outbreak statistics ==
Daily statistics of tornadoes during the tornado outbreak of April 2–3, 1956
| Date (Note: All dates are based on the local time zone where the tornado touched down; however, all times are in Coordinated Universal Time and dates are split at midnight CST/CDT for consistency.) | Total | F-scale rating (Note: The Fujita scale was devised under the aegis of scientist T. Theodore Fujita in the early 1970s. Prior to the advent of the scale in 1971, tornadoes in the United States were officially unrated. Tornado ratings were retroactively applied to events prior to the formal adoption of the F-scale by the National Weather Service. While the Fujita scale has been superseded by the Enhanced Fujita scale in the U.S. since February 1, 2007, Canada used the old scale until April 1, 2013; nations elsewhere, like the United Kingdom, apply other classifications such as the TORRO scale.) | | | | | | | Deaths | Injuries | Damage (Note: The National Oceanic and Atmospheric Administration's Storm Data publication does not list exact damage totals for every event, instead giving damage categories. As such, damage for individual tornadoes is not comprehensive.) |
| Date | Total | FU | F0 | F1 | F2 | F3 | F4 | F5 | Deaths | Injuries | Damage |
|---|---|---|---|---|---|---|---|---|---|---|---|
| April 2 | 20 | 0 | 3 | 4 | 7 | 3 | 3 | 0 | 7 | 144 | ≥ $1,657,530 |
| April 3 | 35 | 3 | 1 | 2 | 18 | 5 | 5 | 1 | 32 | 646 | $6,378,000 |
| Total | 55 | 3 | 4 | 6 | 25 | 8 | 8 | 1 | 39 | 790 | ≥ $8,035,530 |

== Confirmed tornadoes ==
Confirmed tornadoes by Fujita rating
| FU | F0 | F1 | F2 | F3 | F4 | F5 | Total |
|---|---|---|---|---|---|---|---|
| 3 | 4 | 6 | 25 | 8 | 8 | 1 | 55* |

Prior to 1990, there is a likely undercount of tornadoes, particularly E/F0–1, with reports of weaker tornadoes becoming more common as population increased. A sharp increase in the annual average E/F0–1 count by approximately 200 tornadoes was noted upon the implementation of NEXRAD system of Doppler weather radar in 1990–1991. (Note: Historically, the number of tornadoes globally and in the United States was and is likely underrepresented: research by Grazulis on annual tornado activity suggests that, as of 2001, only 53% of yearly U.S. tornadoes were officially recorded. Documentation of tornadoes outside the United States was historically less exhaustive, owing to the lack of monitors in many nations and, in some cases, to internal political controls on public information. Most countries only recorded tornadoes that produced severe damage or loss of life. Significant low biases in U.S. tornado counts likely occurred through the early 1990s, when advanced NEXRAD was first installed and the National Weather Service began comprehensively verifying tornado occurrences.) 1974 marked the first year where significant tornado (E/F2+) counts became homogeneous with contemporary values, attributed to the consistent implementation of Fujita scale assessments. Numerous discrepancies on the details of tornadoes in this outbreak exist between sources. The total count of tornadoes and ratings differs from various agencies accordingly. The list below documents information from the most contemporary official sources alongside assessments from tornado historian Thomas P. Grazulis. In addition to confirmed tornadoes, a funnel cloud near Jenera, Ohio, was officially but incorrectly listed as a tornado.

Color/symbol key
| Color / symbol | Description |
|---|---|
| † | Data from Grazulis 1990/1993/2001b |
| ¶ | Data from a local National Weather Service office |
| ※ | Data from the 1956 Climatological Data National Summary publication |
| ‡ | Data from the NCEI database |
| ♯ | Maximum width of tornado |
| ± | Tornado was rated below F2 intensity by Grazulis but a specific rating is unavailable. |

List of confirmed tornadoes in the tornado outbreak of April 2–3, 1956
| F# | Location | County / Parish | State | Start coord. (Note: All starting coordinates are based on the NCEI database and may not reflect contemporary analyses) | Date | Time (UTC) | Path length | Width (Note: The listed width values are primarily the average/mean width of the tornadoes, with those having known maximum widths denoted by ♯. From 1952 to 1994, reports largely list mean width whereas contemporary years list maximum width. Values provided by Grazulis are the average width, with estimates being rounded down (i.e. 0.5 mi (0.80 km) is rounded down from 880 yards to 800 yards.) | Damage |
|---|---|---|---|---|---|---|---|---|---|
| F1 | SE of Allendale | Worth | Missouri | 40.43°N 94.25°W | April 2 | 07:00–? | 3 mi (4.8 km)※ | 30 yd (27 m) | $2,500‡ |
| F1 | A tornado intermittently damaged outbuildings on three farms. | | | | | | | | |
| F1 | Wilmette | Cook | Illinois | 42.07°N 87.73°W | April 2 | 07:30–? | 2 mi (3.2 km) | 10 yd (9.1 m) | $250,000‡ |
| F1 | A small, short-lived tornado generated minor damage. | | | | | | | | |
| F1 | Owasso | Tulsa | Oklahoma | 36.27°N 95.83°W | April 2 | 16:30–? | 0.25 mi (0.40 km)※ | 33 yd (30 m) | Unknown |
| F1 | A few outbuildings were destroyed in a brief touchdown over remote areas. | | | | | | | | |
| F0 | NW of Pawnee Rock | Barton | Kansas | 38.28°N 99.00°W | April 2 | 00:00–? | 0.1 mi (0.16 km)‡ | 33 yd (30 m)‡ | Unknown |
| F0 | A farm was damaged. | | | | | | | | |
| F2† | NW of Ellinwood to E of Claflin to NE of Holyrood† | Barton, Ellsworth† | Kansas | 38.35°N 98.57°W | April 2 | 00:30†–? | 30 mi (48 km)† | 50 yd (46 m)† | ≥$30,000† |
| F2† | This long-tracked tornado family first produced F1-level damage to hangars and aircraft at the Ellinwood airport. It then damaged drilling rigs, small homes, and utility lines in and near an oil camp on K-4. In southern Holyrood the tornado shifted five homes on their foundations, and a gym and bleachers were wrecked. One person was injured. | | | | | | | | |
| F3 | Hopeton to W of Burlington※ | Woods, Alfalfa | Oklahoma | 36.68°N 98.67°W | April 2 | 01:05–? | 20 mi (32 km) | 400 yd (370 m) | $250,000† |
| F3 | This tornado damaged or destroyed 30 buildings, including 20 homes, and a grain elevator. Three people were injured. | | | | | | | | |
| F0 | WNW of Attica | Harper | Kansas | 37.25°N 98.25°W | April 2 | 01:10–? | 0.1 mi (0.16 km)‡ | 33 yd (30 m)‡ | Unknown |
| F0 | Trees were felled and structures shifted on their foundations. | | | | | | | | |
| F0 | N of Hunter | Mitchell | Kansas | 39.27°N 98.40°W | April 2 | 01:30–? | 3 mi (4.8 km)※ | 33 yd (30 m)‡ | Unknown |
| F0 | A tornado damaged agricultural outbuildings and transmission lines. | | | | | | | | |
| F3† | W of Kremlin to S of Medford† | Garfield, Grant | Oklahoma | 36.55°N 97.85°W | April 2 | 01:45–? | 18 mi (29 km)※ | 100 yd (91 m) | $100,000† |
| F3† | Eight farmsteads were impacted, a few of which incurred borderline-F4 damage. A home near the end of the path was wrecked as well. Three head of cattle perished in a collapsed barn. Four injuries were confirmed. | | | | | | | | |
| F2± | N of Billings | Kay | Oklahoma | 36.65°N 97.45°W | April 2 | 02:45–? | 4 mi (6.4 km)※ | 33 yd (30 m)‡ | $30‡ |
| F2± | Every building on a farm was wrecked except for the farmhouse. Chickens were killed, and agricultural machinery was also destroyed. | | | | | | | | |
| F1 | Northern Tishomingo | Johnston | Oklahoma | 34.25°N 96.67°W | April 2 | 03:29–? | 8 mi (13 km) | 25 yd (0.023 km)※ | $2,500‡ |
| F1 | Many outbuildings, a metal fence, and a concession stand at a drive-in theater were destroyed. Posts at the theater were broken off as well. | | | | | | | | |
| F3† | E of Skedee to E of Fairfax‡ | Pawnee, Osage | Oklahoma | 36.38°N 96.70°W | April 2 | 03:30–? | 10 mi (16 km)† | 100 yd (91 m) | $20,000† |
| F3† | This tornado destroyed a home and unroofed a pair of others. Barns were leveled, outbuildings damaged, and livestock killed as well. One injury occurred. | | | | | | | | |
| F4 | ENE of Kildare (OK) to NW of Howard (KS)† | Kay (OK), Cowley (KS), Chautauqua (KS), Elk (KS) | Oklahoma, Kansas | 36.82°N 96.97°W | April 2 | 03:30–04:10 | 60 mi (97 km)† | 800 yd (730 m)† | Unknown |
| F4 | This was the first member of a long-lived, violent tornado family and likely consisted of multiple tornadoes. Near Hardy several funnel clouds were seen to form a single large tornado. In this area, just south of the Oklahoma–Kansas state line, a home incurred near-F5-level damage, and numerous trees nearby were entirely stripped of their bark. Several outbuildings were wrecked as well, debris strewn over a large area, and a horse and six cattle killed. Only a few people were injured before the tornado entered Kansas. In the latter state F4 damage was reported south of Grenola. Along the entire path 25 people were injured. | | | | | | | | |
| F2† | Between Elbing and Whitewater to ENE of Florence† | Butler, Marion | Kansas | 37.97°N 97.13°W | April 2 | 03:30–? | 16 mi (26 km)† | Unknown | Unknown |
| F2† | Many sheds and barns were destroyed, debris of which was carried for miles. A 90-pound (41 kg) stone penetrated the roof of a home. One injury was reported. | | | | | | | | |
| F4† | Jacktown to Davenport† to Drumright※ | Lincoln, Creek | Oklahoma | 35.50°N 97.00°W | April 2 | 03:33–? | 50 mi (80 km)† | 300 yd (270 m) | $1,000,000† |
| F4† | 5 deaths – A long-tracked, violent tornado began east of Fowler. Eight injuries occurred in Davenport. The tornado passed west of Stroud and continued into Drumright. In Drumright, 63 homes were destroyed and 203 damaged, with five deaths, four of which were in one family. A church and numerous rural farms were destroyed as well. In all, 98 people were injured. | | | | | | | | |
| F2† | Near Cedar Point† | Chase | Kansas | Unknown | April 2 | 03:50–?† | 6 mi (9.7 km)† | Unknown | Unknown |
| F2† | A barn was unroofed and a home wrecked. This is believed to be the first member of a long-tracked family, with five or more tornadoes along the same path, all spawned from the same supercell. | | | | | | | | |
| F2† | W of Strong City (1st tornado)† | Chase | Kansas | 38.38°N 96.55°W‡ | April 2 | 04:40–?† | Unknown | Unknown | Unknown |
| F2† | An automobile was tossed 250 ft (83 yd) and its driver injured. | | | | | | | | |
| F2† | W of Strong City (2nd tornado) to N of Dover† | Chase, Lyon, Wabaunsee, Osage, Shawnee† | Kansas | Unknown | April 2 | 04:40–05:30※ | 55 mi (89 km)† | Unknown | Unknown |
| F2† | This was possibly a family of several tornadoes or a multiple-vortex event. As the tornado crossed Lake Kahola, 16 lakefront summer houses were wrecked. A number of trailers were turned onto their sides as well. Six people were injured, among them a boy near Bushong who was blown through a window and whose leg was injured, along with four men at a quarry near Eskridge. | | | | | | | | |
| F2± | SE of Auburn | Nemaha | Nebraska | 40.37°N 95.83°W | April 2 | 04:45–? | 3 mi (4.8 km)※ | 100 yd (91 m) | $2,500‡ |
| F2± | A garage was destroyed. | | | | | | | | |
| F4† | SW of Toronto to SE of Gridley | Greenwood, Woodson, Coffey | Kansas | 37.60°N 96.13°W | April 2 | 04:58–?※ | 23 mi (37 km)† | 400 yd (370 m)† | Unknown |
| F4† | 2 deaths – This was likely a family of tornadoes. A trailer and a seven-room house were leveled. One of the dead was reportedly found more than 1 mi (1.6 km) away. Four injuries were reported. | | | | | | | | |
| FU※ | E of Harveyville to southwestern Topeka | Osage, Shawnee | Kansas | Unknown | April 3 | 05:30–05:47 | Unknown | Unknown | Unknown |
| FU※ | This tornado passed west of Auburn and through the Seabrook section of Topeka. In Seabrook, the tornado broke glass, blew out bricks, and damaged television antennae and trees. Crops were impacted as well. | | | | | | | | |
| F3† | Near Meriden to NW of Nortonville† | Jefferson, Atchison | Kansas | 39.35°N 95.47°W | April 3 | 05:55–?† | 20 mi (32 km)† | 300 yd (270 m)† | ≥$250,000† |
| F3† | This was the last member of a 150-mile-long (240 km) tornado family. Several farmhouses were wrecked and 19 cattle were killed in a barn. Two people were injured. | | | | | | | | |
| F2† | Sobol※ | Pushmataha | Oklahoma | 34.15°N 95.22°W | April 3 | 06:05–? | 2 mi (3.2 km) | 100 yd (91 m) | $20,000† |
| F2† | An entire farmstead was wrecked and a school, house, and various outbuildings damaged. Three injuries were reported. | | | | | | | | |
| F4 | SW of Narcissa (OK) to SE of Carterville (MO)‡ | Ottawa (OK), Cherokee (KS), Jasper (MO) | Oklahoma, Kansas, Missouri | 36.77°N 94.97°W | April 3 | 06:10–? | 40 mi (64 km)† | 800 yd (730 m)† | $725,000† |
| F4 | This violent, long-tracked tornado affected the Joplin, Missouri, metropolitan area. A home sustained F4 damage in the Quapaw–Miami area, its debris being dispersed 500 ft (170 yd). 61 homes were destroyed or damaged in this area. The tornado then crossed the Oklahoma–Kansas state line into Baxter Springs, destroying or damaging 27 homes, along with a grandstand at a baseball field, and felling trees. The tornado crossed into Missouri west of Joplin and passed through Webb City, damaging 30 homes and several businesses. In all, 54 people were injured. | | | | | | | | |
| F2† | S of Noel to Pineville‡ | McDonald | Missouri | 36.50°N 94.48°W | April 3 | 06:30–? | 8 mi (13 km)† | 35 yd (32 m)† | $25,000‡ |
| F2† | Five barns were wrecked and roofing of homes damaged. One person was injured. | | | | | | | | |
| F2 | NE of Highland† | Iowa | Wisconsin | 43.10°N 90.25°W | April 3 | 17:00–? | 4 mi (6.4 km)※ | 200 yd (180 m) | $100,000† |
| F2 | A tornado leveled a pair of barns, one of which had its CBU foundation dislodged. | | | | | | | | |
| F2± | Thebes※ | Ashley | Arkansas | 33.30°N 91.58°W | April 3 | 18:25–? | 2 mi (3.2 km)※ | 200 yd (180 m)※ | $2,500‡ |
| F2± | Several sheds and a barn were destroyed. A home sustained damage as well. | | | | | | | | |
| F3† | Western Bancroft to NW of Amherst† | Portage | Wisconsin | 44.25°N 89.52°W | April 3 | 18:50–? | 18 mi (29 km)※ | 100 yd (91 m) | $180,000† |
| F3† | 2 deaths – Various outbuildings and barns were destroyed at eight different locations. The deaths occurred separately in homes that were destroyed. Seven injuries were reported. | | | | | | | | |
| F2 | SSW of Lake Village† | Chicot | Arkansas | 33.25°N 91.43°W | April 3 | 19:00–? | 1 mi (1.6 km) | 20 yd (18 m) | $20,000† |
| F2 | A pair of homes were destroyed and another pair damaged. Sheds and barns were wrecked as well. | | | | | | | | |
| F4 | SSW of Berlin to northwestern Omro‡ | Green Lake, Waushara‡, Winnebago※ | Wisconsin | 43.98°N 88.93°W | April 3 | 19:30†–20:05※ | 12 mi (19 km)※ | 400 yd (370 m)※ | $1,000,000† |
| F4 | 7 deaths – See section on this tornado | | | | | | | | |
| F2† | E of Ogdensburg to near Symco | Waupaca | Wisconsin | Unknown | April 3 | 19:45–? | 7 mi (11 km) | 100 yd (91 m) | Unknown |
| F2† | Nine barns, a rural school, and a general store were wrecked. | | | | | | | | |
| F2 | Linn† | Sunflower | Mississippi | 33.55°N 90.60°W | April 3 | 20:30–? | Unknown | Unknown | Unknown |
| F2 | This strong tornado wrecked a pair of homes, injuring a few people. It was the first member of a long-tracked tornado family that began west of Sunflower, passed near Chesterville, and continued to Belden and Saltillo. | | | | | | | | |
| F2± | NE of Lawrenceville※ | Lawrence | Illinois | 38.73°N 87.68°W | April 3 | 20:30–? | 3 mi (4.8 km)※ | 33 yd (30 m)‡ | $25,000‡ |
| F2± | This strong tornado struck a sawmill, wrecking a spacious outbuilding there. A concrete structure was also damaged, with packaged lumber strewn all about. Several windows were broken as well. | | | | | | | | |
| F2± | ESE of Kempton | Ford | Illinois | 40.92°N 88.20°W | April 3 | 22:00–? | 2 mi (3.2 km) | 50 yd (46 m) | $25,000‡ |
| F2± | A barn was unroofed, other structures damaged, a newly-built chicken coop destroyed, and windows shattered. | | | | | | | | |
| F3 | E of Dixon to NNE of Zion‡ | Webster, Henderson | Kentucky | 37.52°N 87.67°W | April 3 | 22:00–? | 10 mi (16 km)※ | 200 yd (180 m)† | $25,000† |
| F3 | 1 death – One home and several barns were wrecked. Many livestock were killed as well. The lone victim was thrown 250 feet (83.3 yd) from her home. Two other individuals were injured. | | | | | | | | |
| F2± | NE of Klondyke※ | Vermillion※ | Indiana | 39.42°N 86.97°W | April 3 | 22:00–?※ | 0.284 mi (0.457 km)※ | 10 yd (9.1 m) | $25,000‡ |
| F2± | A brief tornado unroofed a barn and stripped a farmhouse of some roof shingles. A window was smashed as well. | | | | | | | | |
| F2 | SW of Weldon to E of De Land‡ | De Witt, Piatt | Illinois | 40.10°N 88.78°W | April 3 | 22:08–? | 10 mi (16 km)※ | 40 yd (37 m) | $30,000† |
| F2 | Buildings were wrecked on four farmsteads and other structures were unroofed. | | | | | | | | |
| F4¶ | Western Saugatuck to Gibson to southwestern Holland | Allegan | Michigan | 42.67°N 86.22°W | April 3 | 22:45–23:00 | 9 mi (14 km) | 100 yd (91 m) | Unknown |
| F4¶ | See article on this tornado – Seven people were injured. | | | | | | | | |
| F4 | SE of Chapel Hill to Lexington to Alberton‡ | Henderson | Tennessee | 35.58°N 88.47°W | April 3 | 22:45–23:00※ | 12 mi (19 km)※ | 100 yd (91 m) | $1,250,000† |
| F4 | 3 deaths – A violent tornado destroyed a pair of businesses, along with 46 homes, a number of which received F4 damage. Additionally, 250 homes and 20 businesses were damaged. Bodies were tossed 100 yd (300 ft), and 60 people were injured as well. | | | | | | | | |
| F3† | SW of Salem to Canton to near Little York† | Washington | Indiana | 38.60°N 86.12°W | April 3 | 22:45–?※ | 23 mi (37 km)※ | 150 yd (140 m)※ | $600,000† |
| F3† | This intense tornado shifted a large bridge and destroyed or damaged more than 100 structures, including numerous barns. One of the victims later died in another tornado on March 19, 1963. A freezer was reportedly thrown a 1/2 mi (0.80 km). A dozen injuries were reported. | | | | | | | | |
| F1 | Pana※ | Christian※ | Illinois | 39.65°N 88.50°W | April 3 | 23:00–? | 5 mi (8.0 km)※ | 100 yd (91 m) | $25,000‡ |
| F1 | Trees were felled and a pair of outbuildings overturned. | | | | | | | | |
| F2† | NW of Silver Lake† | Kosciusko | Indiana | 40.98°N 85.97°W | April 3 | 23:04–?※ | 1.5 mi (2.4 km) | 70 yd (64 m) | $50,000† |
| F2† | 10 cottages on Yellow Creek Lake received damage, half of which were flattened. | | | | | | | | |
| F5 | E of Vriesland to Hudsonville to Standale to N of Trufant¶ | Ottawa, Kent, Montcalm | Michigan | 42.77°N 85.98°W | April 3 | 23:30¶–00:41※ | 48 mi (77 km)¶ | 400 yd (370 m)¶ | Unknown |
| F5 | 17 deaths – See section on this tornado – 333 people were injured. | | | | | | | | |
| F0 | SW of Pride‡ | Union | Kentucky | 37.55°N 87.90°W | April 3 | 23:30–? | 0.1 mi (0.16 km)‡ | 33 yd (30 m)‡ | $2,500‡ |
| F0 | A brief tornado, probably spawned by the same storm as the Dixon–Zion F3, damaged a garage, a barn, and a number of homes. | | | | | | | | |
| F4 | Portage Point to E of Suttons Bay¶ | Manistee, Benzie, Grand Traverse, Leelanau※ | Michigan | 44.37°N 86.23°W | April 3 | 23:35–00:45¶ | 50 mi (80 km)¶ | 200 yd (180 m)† | $400,000† |
| F4 | 1 death – This possible tornado family, which passed northwest of Onekama, destroyed 13 homes and at least 26 barns before ending over Grand Traverse Bay. Two homes in Benzie County were leveled, one of which was a multi-story building, resulting in the lone death. Other homes were wrecked at Lake Ann, at Cedar Run, and near Solon, along with a barn at Bear Lake. The tornado affected very rural areas for most of its life, and was rated F3 by Grazulis. However, a reanalysis by the National Weather Service in 2008 reaffirmed the official F4 rating. 25 people were injured. | | | | | | | | |
| F2† | Near Chesterville to Belden to Saltillo† | Pontotoc, Lee | Mississippi | Unknown | April 3 | 00:00–?† | 15 mi (24 km)† | 200 yd (180 m)† | Unknown |
| F2† | A gym at a school was wrecked, along with four homes. Four injuries occurred. | | | | | | | | |
| F3 | SW of Bangor to S of Lowell※ | Van Buren, Allegan, Barry, Kent | Michigan | 42.27°N 86.13°W | April 3 | 00:15–01:30※ | 55 mi (89 km)¶ | 150 yd (140 m)† | $1,000,000† |
| F3 | See section on this tornado – 12 people were injured. | | | | | | | | |
| FU※ | Emma | LaGrange | Indiana | Unknown | April 3 | 00:20–? | Unknown | Unknown | Unknown |
| FU※ | A brief tornado threw two people from a horse and buggy, neither of whom was injured. Several structures were impacted as well. | | | | | | | | |
| F1 | ESE of Fountain Head‡ | Sumner | Tennessee | 36.53°N 86.45°W | April 3 | 00:45–?※ | 0.2 mi (0.32 km)‡ | 7 yd (6.4 m)‡ | $25,000‡ |
| F1 | A dozen barns and many homes were wrecked. | | | | | | | | |
| F2 | Northern Topeka to W of LaGrange† | LaGrange | Indiana | 41.63°N 85.48°W | April 3 | 01:05–?† | 7 mi (11 km)† | Unknown | $118,000† |
| F2 | A number of spacious homes lost part of their roofs and were otherwise damaged or moved. Four barns were wrecked as well. | | | | | | | | |
| F2 | Cedarbluff to Siloam※ | Clay | Mississippi | 33.58°N 88.83°W | April 3 | 01:30–? | 6 mi (9.7 km)※ | 200 yd (180 m)† | $150,000† |
| F2 | Many barns and homes were wrecked, along with a pair of churches. A few people were injured, and livestock was killed as well. | | | | | | | | |
| F2± | E of Leiters Ford to WNW of Richland Center‡ | Fulton | Indiana | 41.12°N 86.38°W | April 3 | 01:30–? | 4.1 mi (6.6 km)‡ | 50 yd (46 m)‡ | $25,000‡ |
| F2± | This tornado damaged many barns. | | | | | | | | |
| F2† | W of Wawaka※ | Noble | Indiana | 41.43°N 85.50°W | April 3 | 01:50–? | 0.1 mi (0.16 km) | 75 yd (69 m)※ | $30,000† |
| F2† | A brief tornado destroyed or damaged six barns, lifting one onto a highway. Another barn was blown to pieces. | | | | | | | | |
| F2± | WSW of Boston | Wayne | Indiana | 39.73°N 84.88°W | April 3 | 02:30–? | 5 mi (8.0 km)※ | 50 yd (46 m)※ | $250,000‡ |
| F2± | Farmsteads and homes received damage. | | | | | | | | |
| FU† | Unknown | Leflore, Grenada, Yalobusha, Calhoun | Mississippi | 33.60°N 90.45°W | April 3 | Unknown | Unknown | Unknown | Unknown |
| FU† | One or more tornadoes occurred along the path. | | | | | | | | |

=== Berlin, Wisconsin ===
Berlin, Wisconsin
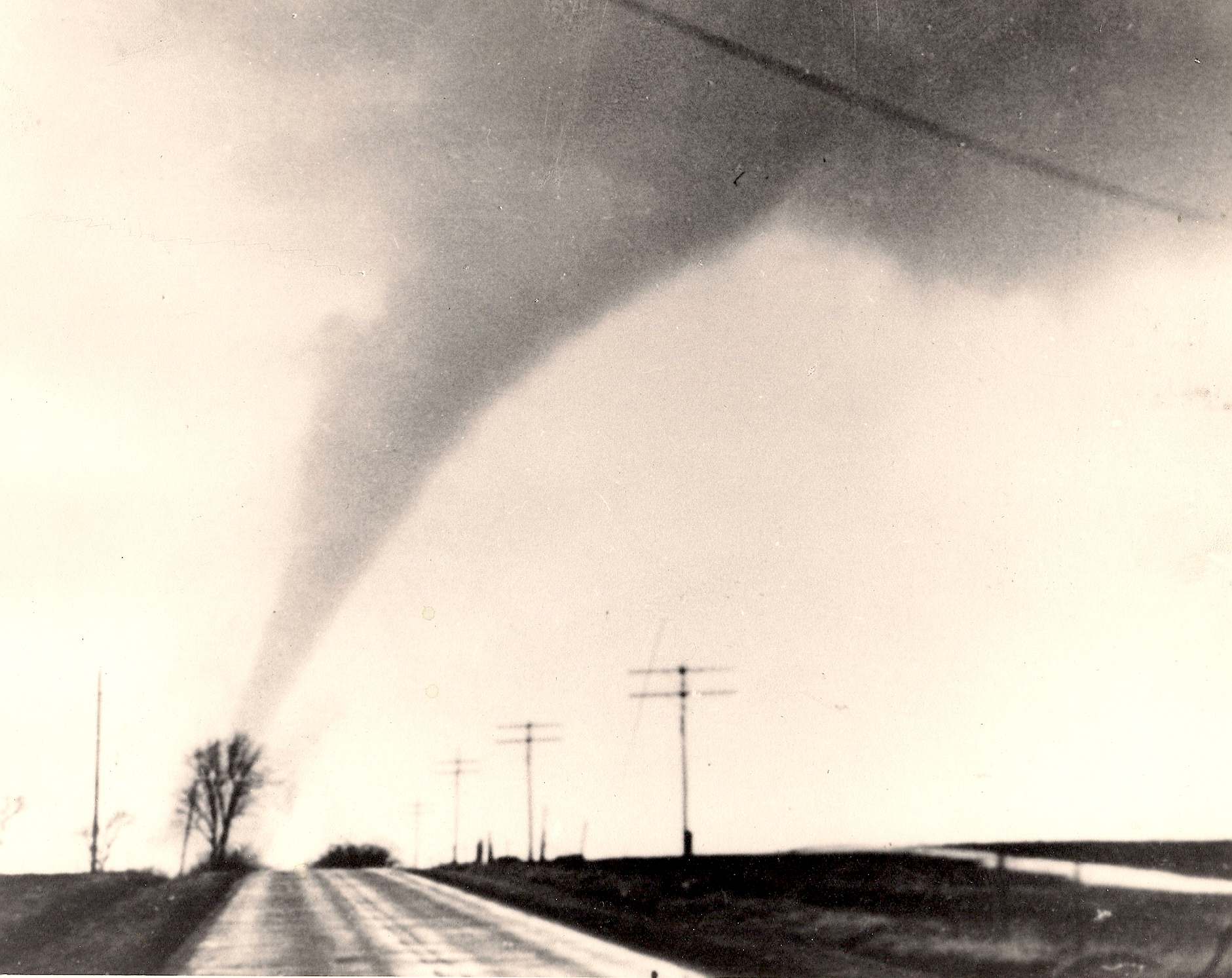
- The tornado as seen from Highway 49, looking north towards Berlin

Meteorological history
- Formed: April 3, 1956 , 1:45 p.m. CDT (UTC−05:00)
- Dissipated: April 3, 1956 , 1:53 p.m. CDT (UTC−05:00)
- Duration: 8 minutes

F4 tornado
- on the Fujita scale
- Highest winds: >207 mph (333 km/h)

Overall effects
- Fatalities: 7
- Injuries: 20

At around 1:45 PM CST, A thin but violent tornado would touch down just to the south of Berlin, Wisconsin. The tornado would track northwest towards the city. In Berlin the tornado would level The Carnation plant, along with multiple homes, destroying a total of 20. Various items from Berlin would be thrown all across Wisconsin. A package of knitted products from a knitting mill was carried north for 35 miles, and a package of papers would be found 75 miles to the north-northeast of Berlin. The tornado would claim the lives of 7 within Berlin before tracking northeastward. The tornado would remain over rural areas until it dissipated 2 miles west of Omro, Wisconsin at around 1:53 PM CST.

=== Saugatuck–Gibson–Graafschap–Holland, Michigan ===
Saugatuck–Gibson–Graafschap–Holland, Michigan
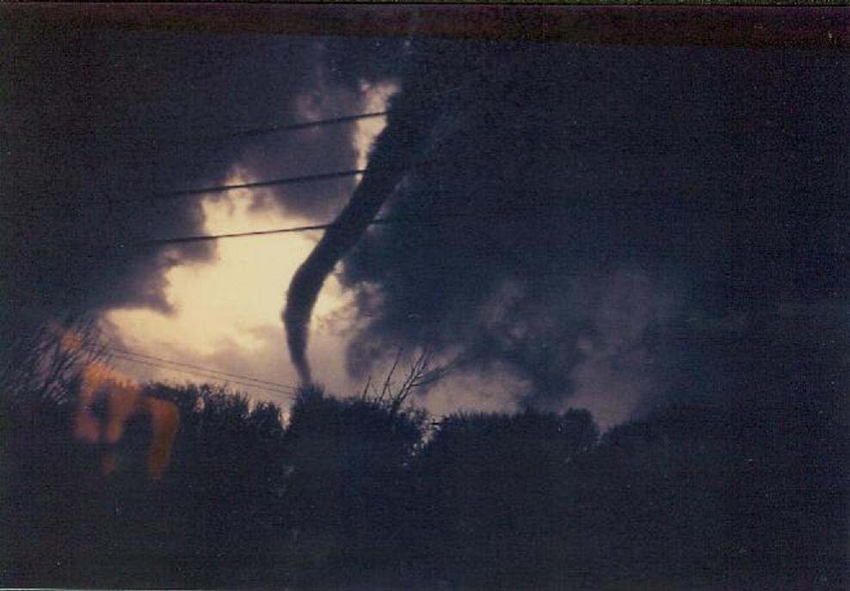
- The tornado near dissipation.

Meteorological history
- Formed: April 3, 1956 , 5:40 p.m. CST (UTC–06:00)
- Dissipated: April 3, 1956 , 6:00 p.m. CST (UTC–06:00)
- Duration: 20 minutes

F4 tornado
- on the Fujita scale
- Highest winds: 207–260 mph (333–418 km/h)

Overall effects
- Injuries: 7

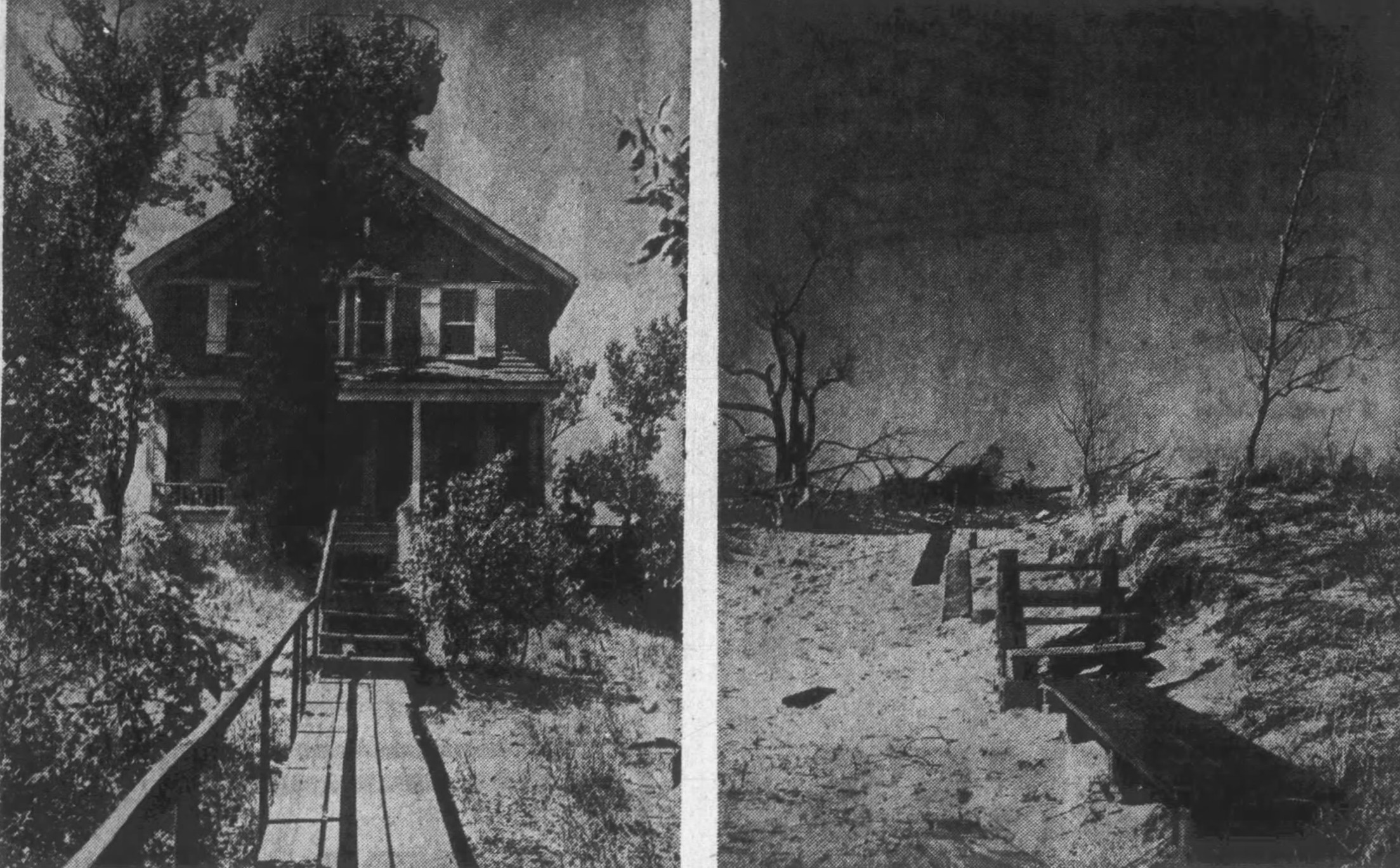
A home in Saugatuck before and after the tornado.

This violent tornado was the first violent tornado in Michigan that day. It and the Hudsonville–Standale F5 are officially listed as a single, long-tracked, continuous tornado with a 58.8-mile-long (94.6 km) path, but were retrospectively and separately determined by Thomas P. Grazulis and the National Weather Service of which one was a 9-mile-long (14 km) F4 and the other a 48-mile-long (77 km) F5, the latter being the most recent F5 tornado on record in Michigan. The first tornado may have passed through or near Gibson and Graafschap, lifted in south Holland, and passed aloft over Zeeland Charter Township.

A tornado developed over Lake Michigan and moved ashore a short distance south of Oval Beach, damaging a CMU building and several summer houses at Camp Gray. Heading north-northeastward, it passed near Mount Baldhead, wrecking a wooden beachfront home. An old, well-constructed, anchor-bolted lighthouse, fastened by a dozen iron pylons, was leveled, along with a trio of outbuildings and a cabin; all the pylons at the lighthouse were snapped or dislodged, indicating F4 winds. The tornado crossed part of the present-day Saugatuck Dunes State Park. Along the rest of its path, the tornado wrecked three homes—one brick, a pair frame, a twin-storied among the latter—and unroofed or destroyed a few barns. A few of the homes sustained at least F4 damage. Windows were smashed at a multi-story retail structure as well. Barns, outbuildings, and garages were wrecked along the path. Seven people were injured.

=== Hudsonville–Walker/Standale–Comstock Park–Trufaunt, Michigan ===
Hudsonville–Walker/Standale–Comstock Park–Trufaunt, Michigan
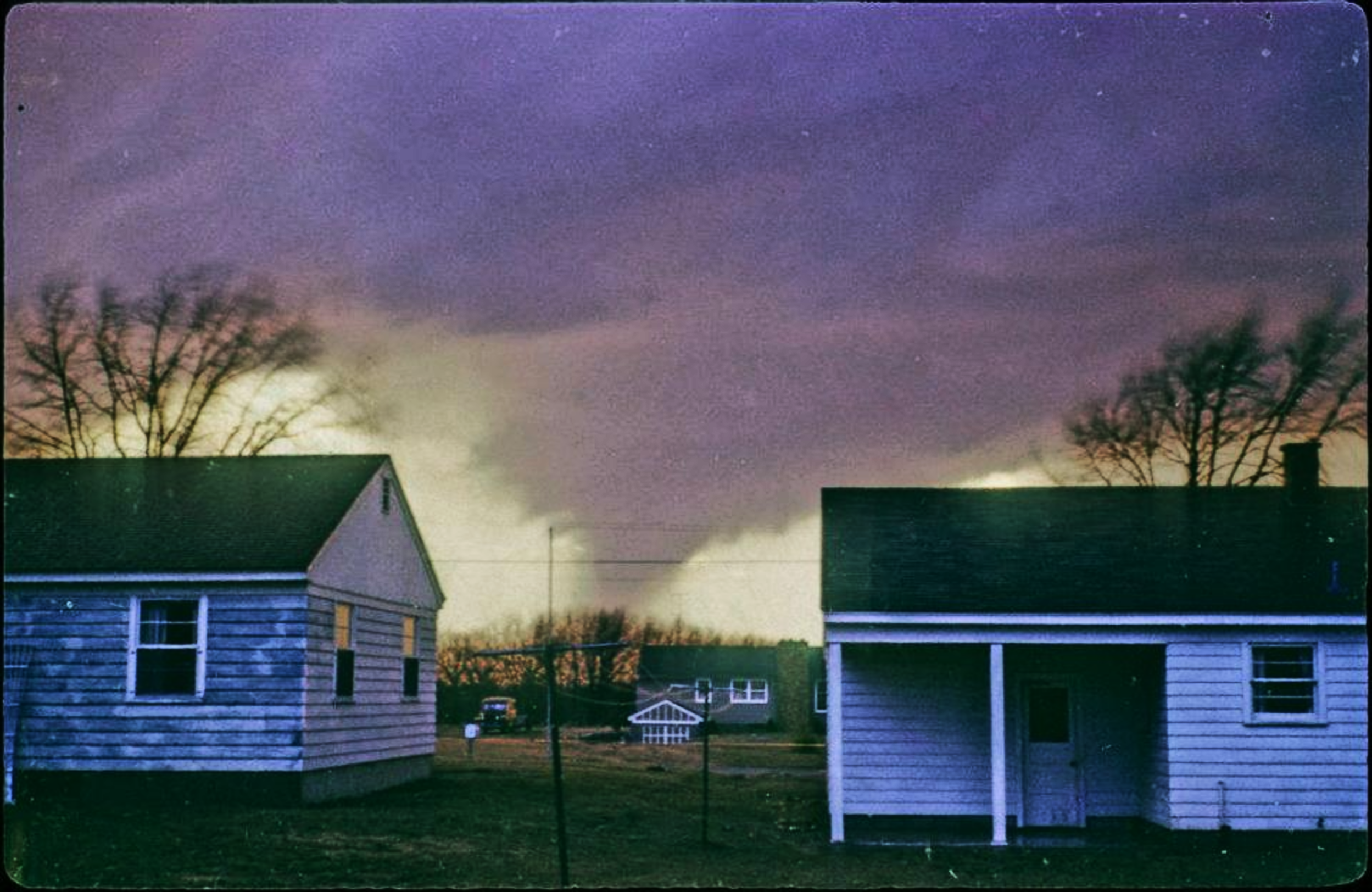
- The tornado as it was going through the suburbs of Grand Rapids.

Meteorological history
- Formed: April 3, 1956 , 6:30 p.m. CST (UTC–06:00)
- Dissipated: April 3, 1956 , 7:30 p.m. CST (UTC–06:00)
- Duration: 1 hour

F5 tornado
- on the Fujita scale
- Highest winds: >261 mph (420 km/h)

Overall effects
- Fatalities: 17
- Injuries: 285-340

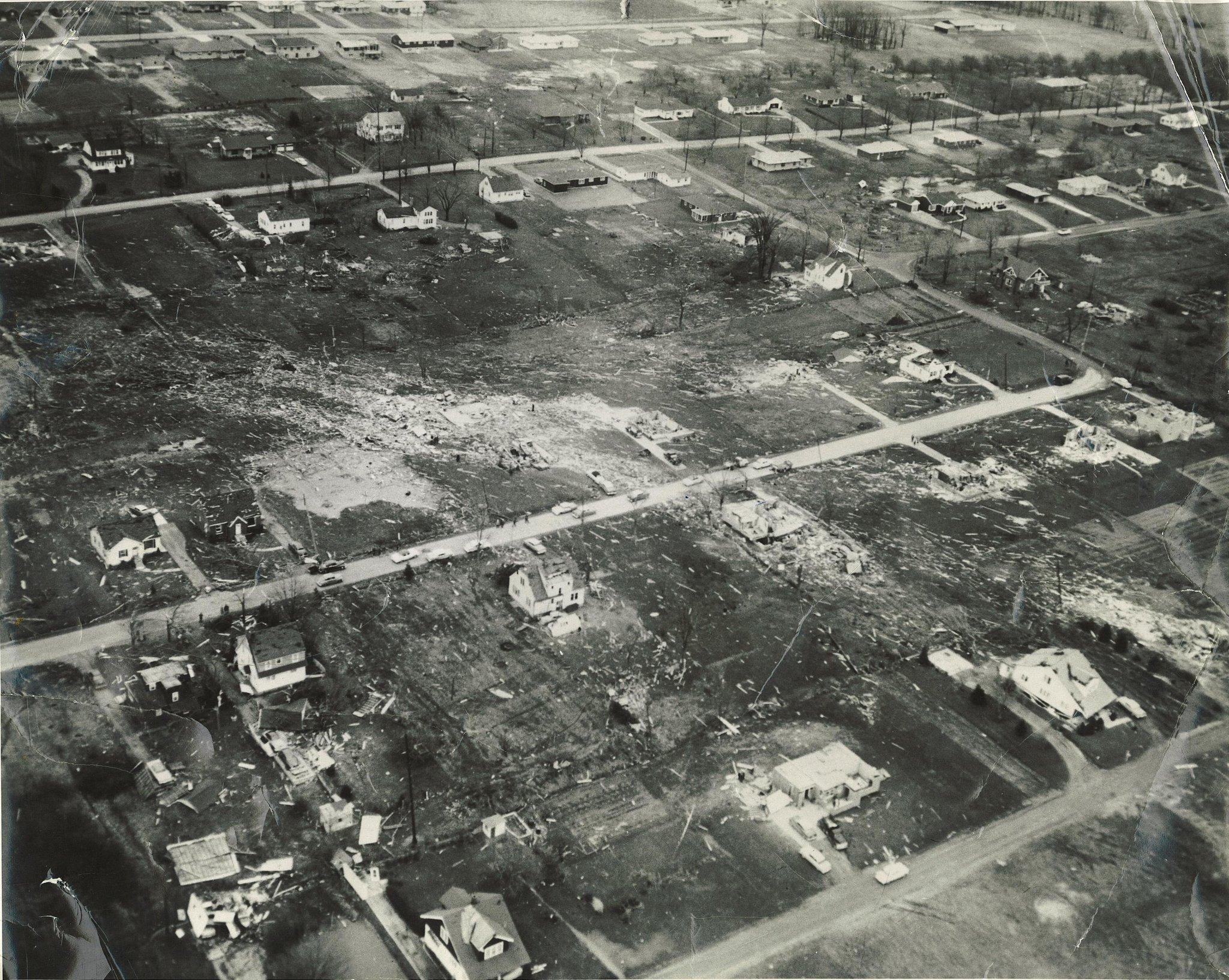
An aerial photograph of a neighborhood in SE Walker, Michigan after the tornado. F5 damage occurred here.

Beginning a short distance east of Vriesland in Ottawa County, Michigan, this violent tornado formed after the dissipation of the Saugatuck F4. Rapidly intensifying, it moved northeastward over the southwestern and northern suburbs of Grand Rapids, causing F5 damage to homes there. Within half an hour the tornado killed 13 people as it tracked from Hudsonville to Walker and thence to Comstock Park, the last of which would be hit by an F4 tornado on Palm Sunday in 1965. Homes in Hudsonville and the Standale neighborhood of Walker were cleanly swept away from their foundations, with only small pieces of debris recovered in some locations. One home was so obliterated that all the floor tiles had been completely torn up in a sheet from the foundation. Vehicles nearby were tossed hundreds of yards and mangled beyond recognition. Extensive wind-rowing of debris was observed, and hundreds of trees were snapped or uprooted. After devastating the Hudsonville–Western Grand Rapids-Comstock Park area, the tornado continued northeastward, past Rockford, blowing away a home and damaging several farmsteads before dissipating near Trufant. 17 people were killed and 285-340 others were injured by the storm. This, the fourth deadliest tornado in Michigan on record, was the last F5 (confirmed and/or possible) in the state and occurred three years after the Flint–Beecher tornado that killed 116. The tornado that struck the Grand Rapids area was the inspiration for the La Dispute song "Hudsonville, MI 1956". Meanwhile, Hudsonville would be hit directly by a brief-but-weak F2 tornado that caved the roof of an onion storage warehouse. just one year later, although that tornado caused no casualties.

=== Bangor–Allegan–Lowell, Michigan ===
Bangor–Allegan–Lowell, Michigan
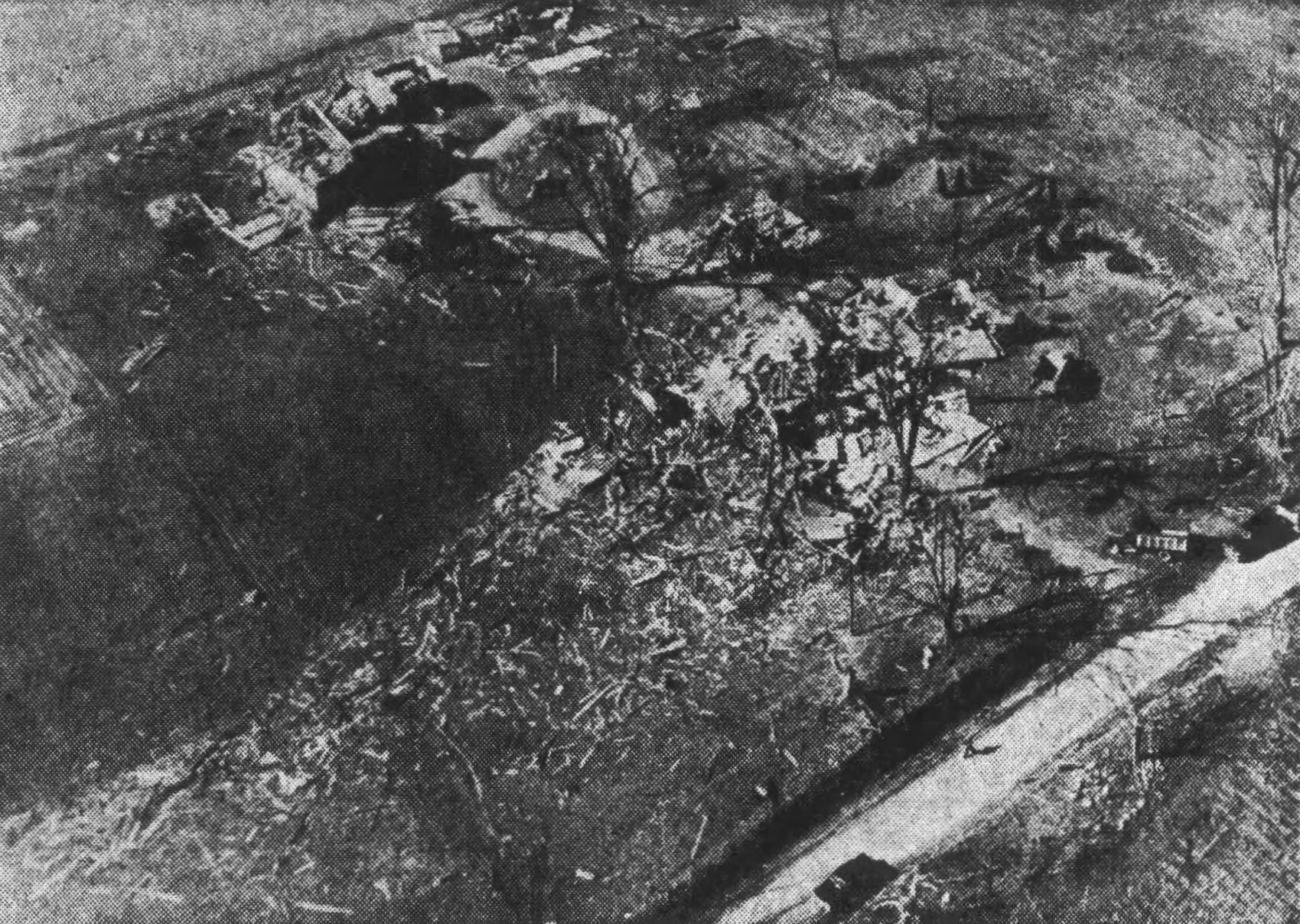
- A farmhouse near Bloomingdale that was destroyed by the tornado.

Meteorological history
- Formed: April 3, 1956 , 7:15 p.m. CST (UTC–06:00)
- Dissipated: April 3, 1956 , 8:30 p.m. CST (UTC–06:00)
- Duration: 1 hour, 15 minutes

F3 tornado
- on the Fujita scale
- Highest winds: 158–206 mph (254–332 km/h)

Overall effects
- Injuries: 12
- Damage: $1,000,000 ($11,840,000 in 2025 USD)

This intense, long-lived tornado family passed through or near Bangor, Bloomingdale, and the southern half of Allegan. Near the Van Buren–Allegan County line, it leveled a farmhouse and swept away several lakeside cabins; the farmhouse may have sustained F4 damage, but may not have been sufficiently well built, so only F3 damage is confirmable. In Allegan, the tornado mostly unroofed a road commission building and a factory, and 12 or more farms reported severe losses to livestock. Afterward, the tornado weakened, veered rightward, and may have lifted and reformed into a new event, as no structural damage occurred and damage to vegetation was lighter than elsewhere along the path. The tornado then re-intensified in Barry and Kent counties, badly damaging many farms. In all, the tornado destroyed 29 homes, mostly at low-end F3 intensity. A dozen people were injured.

== See also ==
- List of North American tornadoes and tornado outbreaks
- List of F5, EF5, and IF5 tornadoes
- 1920 Palm Sunday tornado outbreak — Also produced multiple violent tornadoes in Michigan
- 2011 Joplin tornado — Also affected the Joplin metropolitan area

== Sources ==
- Agee, Ernest M.; Childs, Samuel (June 1, 2014). "Adjustments in Tornado Counts, F-Scale Intensity, and Path Width for Assessing Significant Tornado Destruction". Journal of Applied Meteorology and Climatology. 53 (6). American Meteorological Society: 1494–1505. doi:10.1175/JAMC-D-13-0235.1.
- Brooks, Harold E. (April 2004). "On the Relationship of Tornado Path Length and Width to Intensity". Weather and Forecasting. 19 (2): 310–19. Bibcode:2004WtFor..19..310B. doi:10.1175/1520-0434(2004)019<0310:OTROTP>2.0.CO;2.
- Cook, A. R.; Schaefer, J. T. (August 2008). "The Relation of El Niño–Southern Oscillation (ENSO) to Winter Tornado Outbreaks". Monthly Weather Review. 136 (8): 3121–3137. Bibcode:2008MWRv..136.3121C. doi:10.1175/2007MWR2171.1.
- Edwards, Roger; LaDue, James G.; Ferree, John T.; Scharfenberg, Kevin; Maier, Chris; Coulbourne, William L. (May 1, 2013). "Tornado Intensity Estimation: Past, Present, and Future". Bulletin of the American Meteorological Society. 94 (5). American Meteorological Society: 641–653. doi:10.1175/BAMS-D-11-00006.1.
- Grazulis, Thomas P. (May 1984). Violent Tornado Climatography, 1880–1982. OSTI (Technical report). NUREG. Washington, D.C.: Nuclear Regulatory Commission. OSTI 7099491. CR-3670.
  - — (November 1990). Significant Tornadoes 1880–1989. Vol. 2. St. Johnsbury, Vermont: The Tornado Project of Environmental Films. ISBN 1-879362-02-3.
  - — (July 1993). Significant Tornadoes 1680–1991: A Chronology and Analysis of Events. St. Johnsbury, Vermont: The Tornado Project of Environmental Films. ISBN 1-879362-03-1.
  - — (2001a). The Tornado: Nature's Ultimate Windstorm. Norman: University of Oklahoma Press. ISBN 978-0-8061-3538-0.
  - — (2001b). F5-F6 Tornadoes. St. Johnsbury, Vermont: The Tornado Project of Environmental Films.
- National Weather Service (April 1956). Storm Data Publication (Report). National Centers for Environmental Information – via Storm Events Database.
- Ostuno, E. J. (2008). Roger Edwards (ed.). "A Case Study in Forensic Meteorology: Investigating the 3 April 1956 Tornadoes in Western Lower Michigan". e-Journal of Severe Storms Meteorology. 3 (1). Norman, Oklahoma: 1–33. doi:10.55599/ejssm.v3i1.14. S2CID 109690212.
- U.S. Weather Bureau (April 1956). "Storm data and unusual weather phenomena". Climatological Data National Summary. 7 (4). Asheville, North Carolina: National Climatic Data Center: 106–14.
