= Belden, Mississippi =

- Unincorporated community
- Location within the state of Mississippi Belden, Mississippi (the United States)
- Coordinates: 34°18′37″N 88°47′18″W
- Country: United States
- State: Mississippi
- County: Lee
- Elevation: 344 ft (105 m)
- Time zone: UTC-6 (Central (CST))
  - Summer (DST): UTC-5 (CDT)
- ZIP Code: 38826
- GNIS feature ID: 666766

Belden, is an unincorporated community in Lee County, Mississippi, United States. Most of the community is located within the city of Tupelo.

== History ==
In the early 1900s, the settlement was a stop on the St. Louis–San Francisco Railway. About that time, Belden had a post office, a school, two churches, several stores, and a population of about 350.
