= Tornadoes of 1956 =

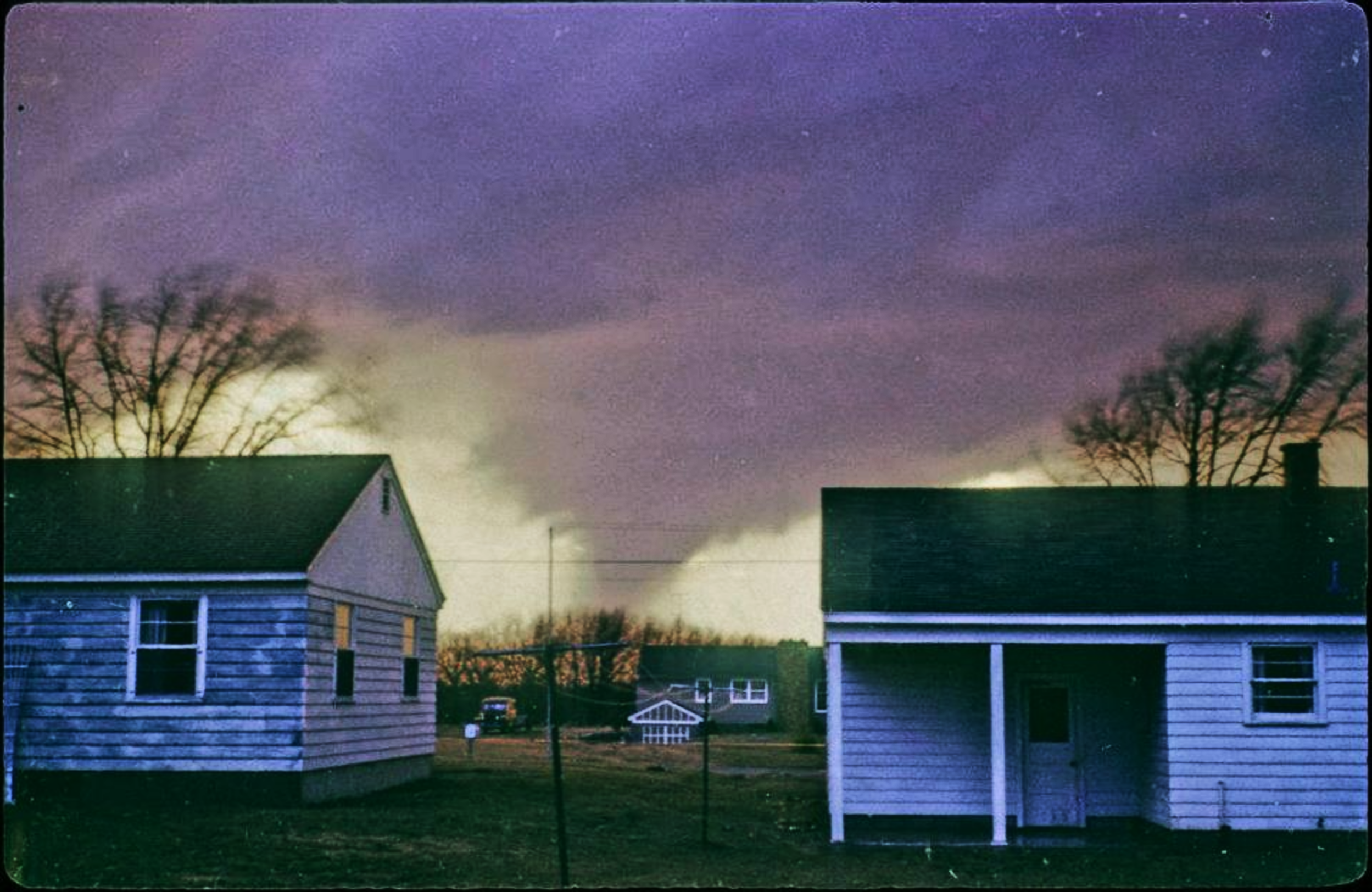
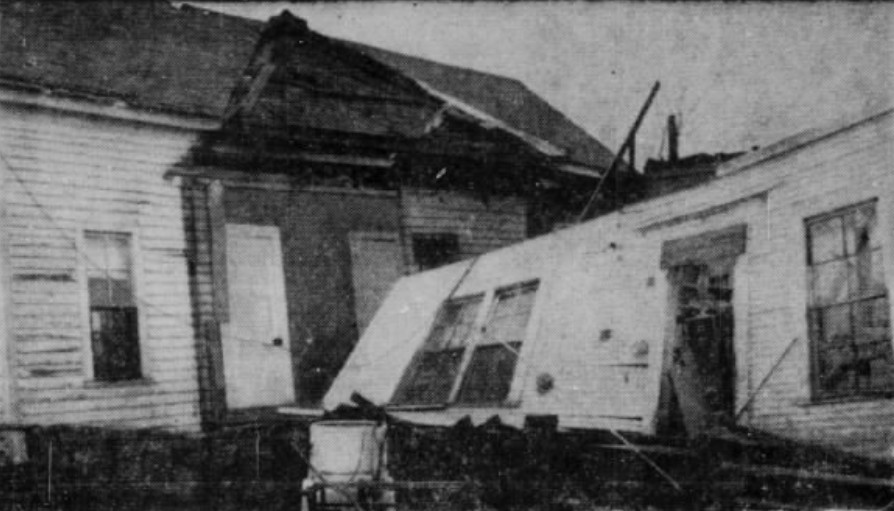
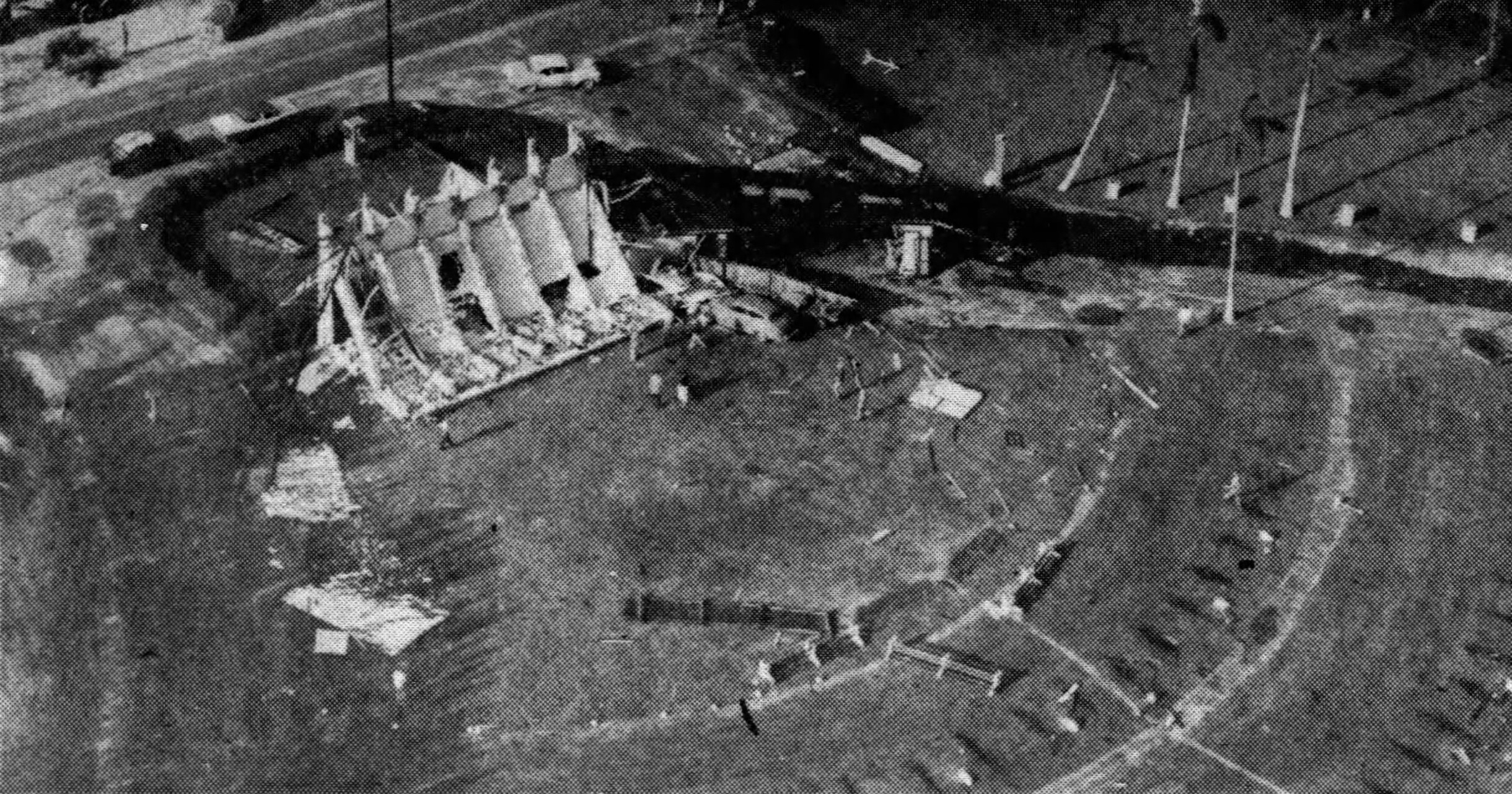
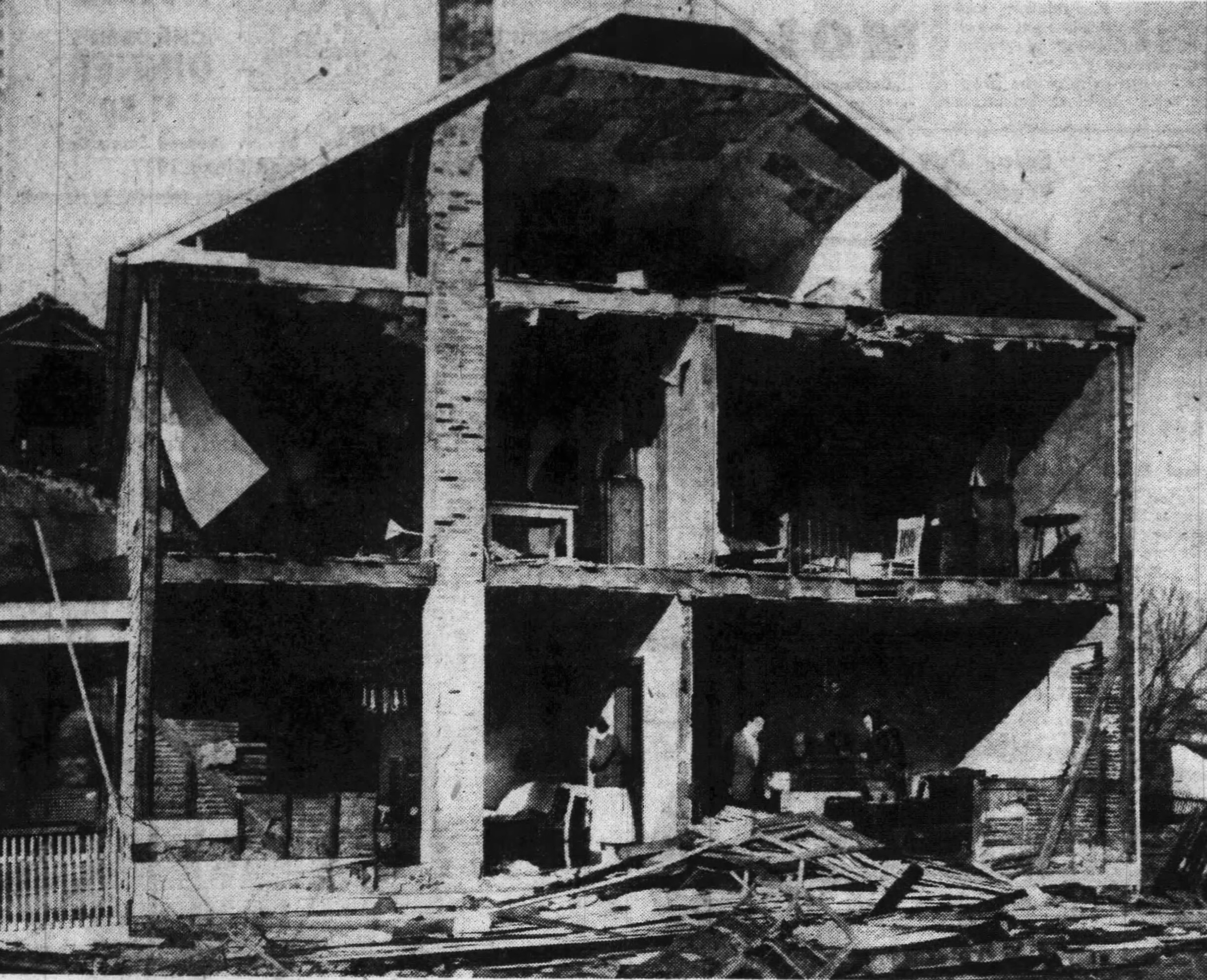
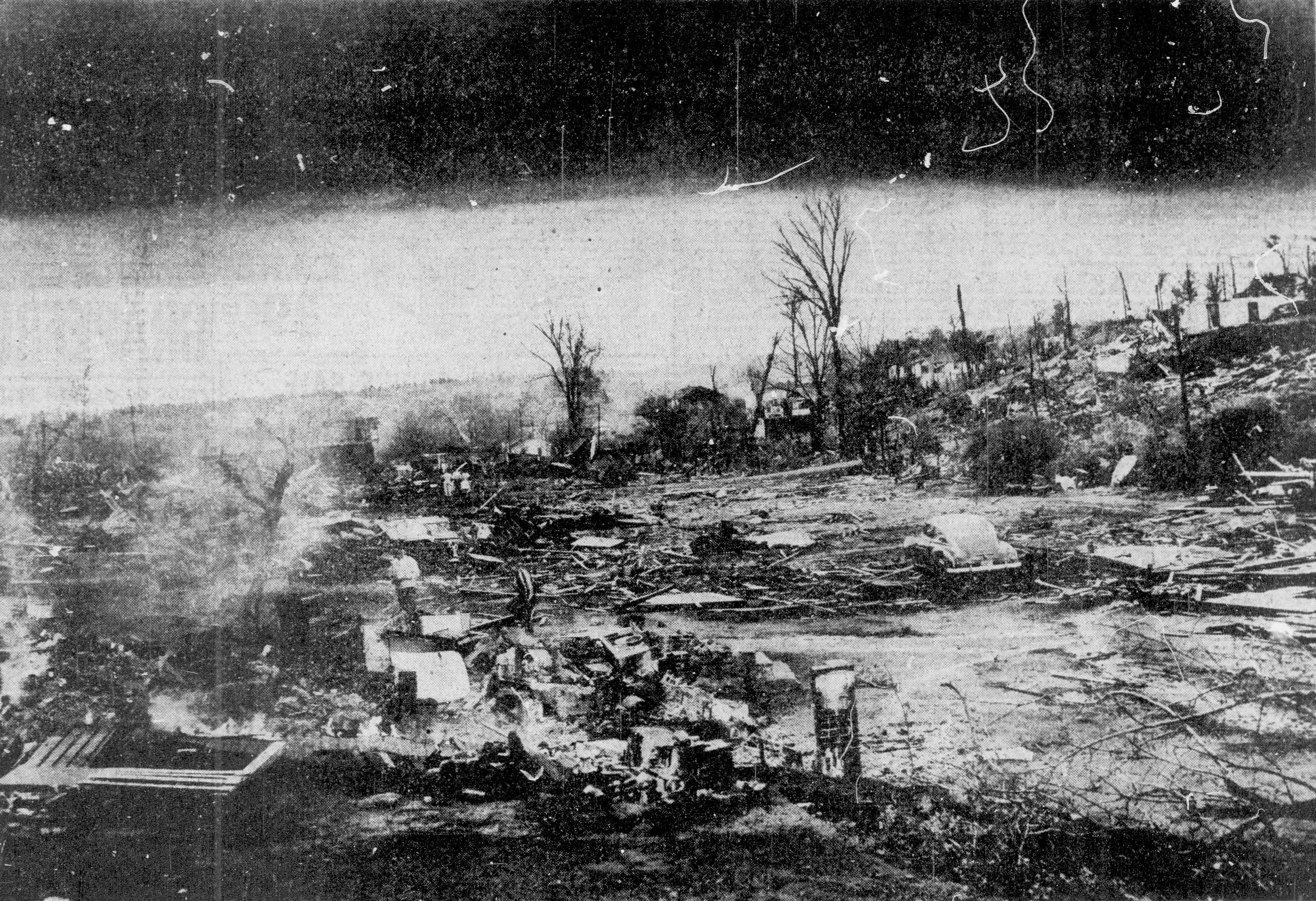
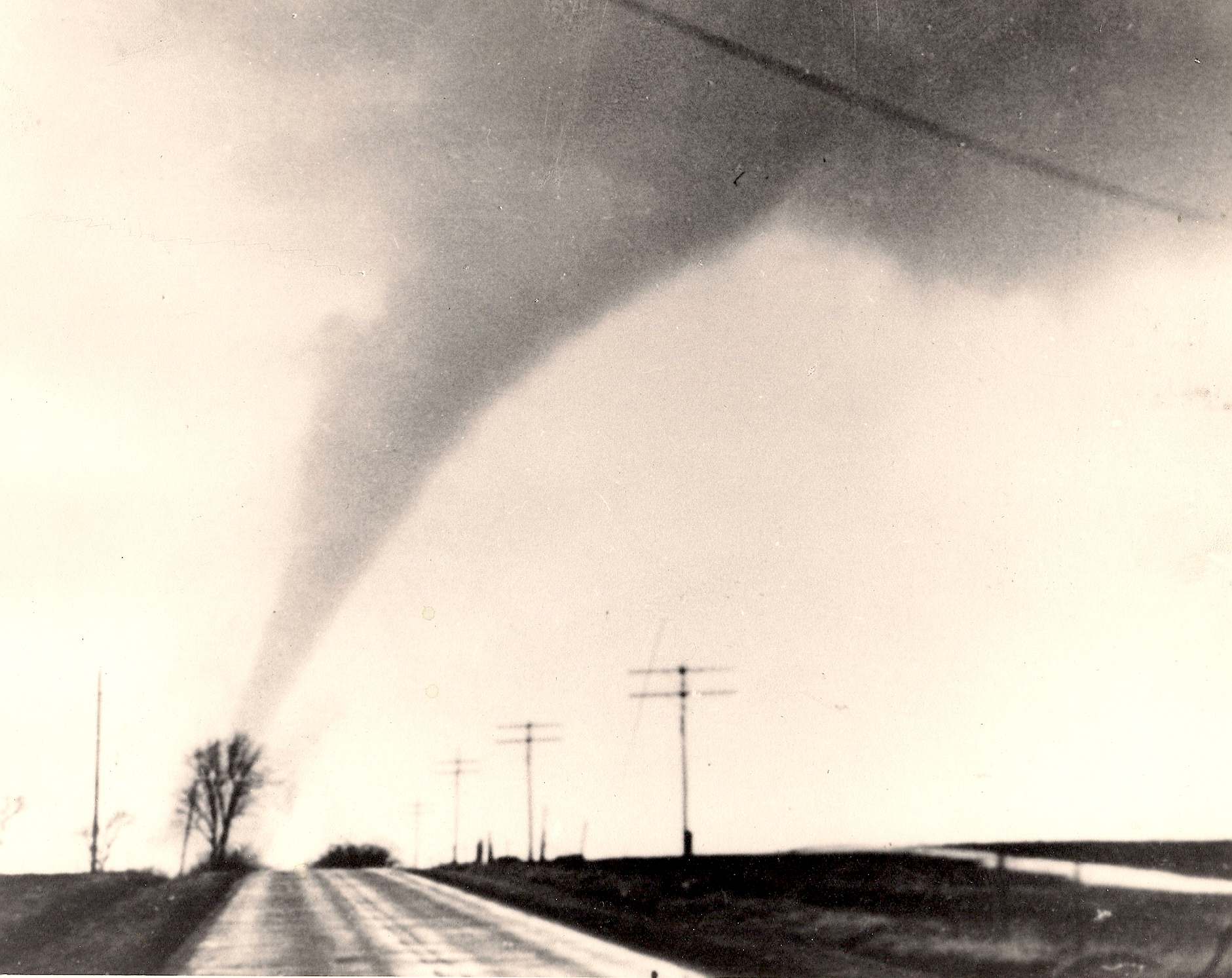
- Clockwise from top A violent F5 tornado in Comstock Park, Michigan on April 3 A drive-in movie theater near Miami, Florida after an F3 tornado on April 10; Violent damage in McDonald Chapel, Alabama after an F4 tornado on April 15; A thin but violent F4 tornado near Berlin, Wisconsin on April 3 A brick home near Summerfield, Illinois after an F4 tornado on February 24; Damage to a home near Conway, Arkansas after an F3 tornado on January 28
- Timespan: 1956
- Maximum rated tornado: F5 tornado: Grand Rapids, Michigan on April 3
- Tornadoes in U.S.: 504
- Damage (U.S.): Unknown
- Fatalities (U.S.): 81
- Fatalities (worldwide): >81

This page documents the tornadoes and tornado outbreaks of 1956, primarily in the United States. Most tornadoes form in the U.S., although some events may take place internationally. Tornado statistics for older years like this often appear significantly lower than modern years due to fewer reports or confirmed tornadoes.

The total count of tornadoes and ratings differs from various agencies accordingly. The article, therefore, documents information from the most contemporary official sources alongside assessments from tornado historian Thomas P. Grazulis.

== Events ==
Fatal United States tornadoes in 1956
- Approximate touchdown location of killer tornadoes in 1956
Summary of tornadoes
- February 14 – Arkansas (1 death)
- February 16 – Mississippi (1 death)
- February 24 – Missouri, Illinois (6 deaths)
- March 6 – Indiana (1 death)
- April 2 – Oklahoma, Kansas (2 deaths)
- April 2 – Oklahoma (5 deaths)
- April 3 – Wisconsin (2 deaths)
- April 3 – Wisconsin (7 deaths)
- April 3 – Kentucky (1 death)
- April 3 – Michigan (17 deaths)
- April 3 – Tennessee (3 deaths)
- April 3 – Michigan (1 death)
- April 15 – Alabama (25 deaths)
- April 28 – Illinois (2 deaths)
- May 12 – Michigan (1 death)
- May 12 – Michigan (3 deaths)
- July 12 – Kansas (1 death)
- August 5 – Ohio (2 deaths)
Total fatalities: 81

1956 featured an extremely active period of tornadoes between February and July, with numerous outbreaks that included strong and violent tornadoes. The deadliest month by far was April, which included several outbreaks, seven violent tornadoes, and 64 fatalities, and hundreds of injuries. The most active month was July, which had 92 tornadoes. A tornado outbreak in late-February also spawned a violent F4 tornado in the suburbs of St. Louis, Missouri, an area that has seen dozens of strong to violent tornadoes in its history.

=== United States yearly total ===
Confirmed tornadoes by Fujita rating
FU	F0	F1	F2	F3	F4	F5	Total
0	125	181	147	38	12	1	504

== January ==
There were 2 tornadoes confirmed in the United States in January.

== February ==
There were 47 tornadoes confirmed in the United States in February.

=== February 14–18 ===
FU	F0	F1	F2	F3	F4	F5
0	2	4	7	3	0	0

A tornado outbreak struck the Southeast over a five-day span. On February 14, an F2 tornado injured two northeast of Evening Shade, Arkansas. Next, a long-tracked F3 tornado struck Galla Rock, Wilson, Blackwell, Middleton, Grand View, Center Ridge, and Whipple, Arkansas, killing one and injuring five. On February 16, an F3 tornado tore through Prairie and Aberdeen, Mississippi, killing one and injuring 55. The next day, a mile-wide F3 tornado mowed down hundreds of trees between Leoma and Goodspring, Tennessee, although there were no casualties. A brief F1 tornado then caused two injuries north-northwest of Allardt, Tennessee. The final tornado occurred on February 18, when an isolated, but strong long-tracked F2 tornado hit LaFayette, Tunnel Hill, and Rocky Face, Georgia without causing any casualties. Overall, there were 16 tornadoes, two fatalities, and 64 injuries.

=== February 24–25 ===
FU	F0	F1	F2	F3	F4	F5
0	4	8	10	0	1	0

An unusual outbreak of 23 tornadoes struck the Midwest during the overnight hours. The first major tornado of the outbreak was a large, long-tracked, 500 yard wide violent F4 tornado that hit the southwestern, southern, and eastern suburbs of St. Louis. It killed six and injured 36 along its 77.6 mile path that started on February 24 and ended on February 25. Later, a strong F2 tornado hit Olney and Pinkstaff, Illinois. Later, a large, 900 yard wide F2 tornado hit Bicknell, the south side of Plainville, and the southwest side Odon, Indiana, injuring one. An F2 tornado struck the Northern Cincinnati suburbs of Fairfield and Furmandale, Ohio, injuring five. Another large, 500 yard wide F2 move directly through Martinsville, Indiana, injuring three. In the end, the nighttime outbreak killed six people and injured 47 others.

== March ==
There were 31 tornadoes confirmed in the United States in March.

=== March 6–8 ===
FU	F0	F1	F2	F3	F4	F5
0	1	3	11	1	1	0

An outbreak of 17 tornadoes impacted the Great Lakes, Ohio and Mississippi Valleys, and the Southeast. On March 6, a large 500 yard wide F3 tornado moved through rural Iroquois County, Illinois, injuring six. An F2 tornado then injured two people near Dunnington and Dunn, Indiana. Later, another F2 tornado injured one in rural Cass County, Indiana. The worst tornado of the outbreak formed and moved in an odd northwest direction, moving through the south side of Hanfield, Indiana east of Marion. The violent F4 tornado killed one and injured 31. The last major tornado of the outbreak occurred on March 7, when an F2 tornado injured one in Camden, West Virginia, although more tornadoes were confirmed into March 8. In the end, the outbreak caused one fatality and 42 injuries.

== April ==
There were 85 tornadoes confirmed in the United States in April.

=== April 2–3 ===
FU	F0	F1	F2	F3	F4	F5
0	5	9	18	9	5	1

A violent outbreak of 47 tornadoes hit the Great Plains, Great Lakes, and the Mississippi and Ohio Valleys. On April 2, an extremely long-tracked F3 tornado family of at least five tornadoes moved through four mostly rural counties in Kansas, striking numerous small towns and cities—including Cottonwood Falls and the west side of Topeka. Although F3 damage only occurred along the final 20 of its 127-mile path, the 790 yard wide tornado injured four. Later, another large, long-tracked tornado family of at least two tornadoes started in rural Kay County, Oklahoma along the Arkansas River and moved into Kansas. The half-mile wide F4 tornado then struck the towns of Maple City and Grenola, moved over Fall River Lake and Toronto Lake, and caused heavy damage in Toronto, and Gridley. Two people were killed and 29 others were injured along the 108.3 mile path. A long-tracked F3 tornado than caused considerable damage in Davenport and Stroud, Oklahoma, killing five and injuring 68.

Tornado activity continued throughout the overnight hours. Early on April 3, another violent, long-tracked F4 tornado hit Northeastern Oklahoma, Southeastern Kansas, and Southwestern Missouri, including the cities of Miami, Oklahoma, Baxter Springs, Kansas, and Joplin, Missouri, injuring 59. That afternoon, two people were killed and two others were injured by an F2 tornado in Portage County, Wisconsin. Later, a large, .25 mile wide, violent F4 tornado slammed through the towns of Berlin, Eureka, Island Park and Omro, Wisconsin, killing seven and injuring 50. This was followed by a very long-tracked F2 tornado family that traveled 124.9 miles through six counties in Mississippi, injuring six.

The deadliest part of the outbreak then started in the mid-afternoon. An F3 tornado hit Robards, Kentucky, killing one and injuring two. A F4 tornado tracked from Saugatuck, Michigan to Holland, Michigan. The most catastrophic tornado of the outbreak then struck: a 600 yard, long-tracked, violent F5 tornado tore a 50.6 mile path through the west side of Hudsonville, Michigan, before striking Standale, Michigan, Comstock Park, Michigan and west Rockford, Michigan before eventually moving northeast and lifting north of Trufant, Michigan, killing 17 and injuring 292. Meanwhile, an F4 tornado hit Lexington, Tennessee, killing three and injuring 60. Later, another large, long-tracked F4 tornado hit the Northern Michigan counties of Benzie, Grand Traverse, Leelanau, and Manistee, killing one and injuring 25 along its 50.3 mile path. An F2 tornado than struck Salem, Indiana, injuring 12. An addition, 12 more people were injured by a long-tracked F3 tornado family that hit the towns of Bloomingdale, Allegan, and Wayland, Michigan on a 60.6 mile path. The final tornado of the outbreak was an F2 tornado in Boston, Indiana, which caused no casualties.

Overall, the violent outbreak was the deadliest of the year as 38 people were killed and 638 others were injured. Damages were estimated at $58.165 million.

=== April 10 ===
FU	F0	F1	F2	F3	F4	F5
0	1	0	0	1	0	0

An F3 tornado hit the western side of Hollywood, Florida as well as Dania Beach, injuring 20. It was the first of only three F3/EF3 tornadoes to affect Broward County, Florida since 1950 with others occurring on February 23, 1965, and March 1, 1980. An F0 tornado was also confirmed in St. Simons, Georgia.

=== April 13 ===
A brief, but rare and destructive F1 tornado struck Chula Vista, California, injuring one person.

=== April 14–15 (Southeastern United States) ===
FU	F0	F1	F2	F3	F4	F5
0	0	0	1	0	1	0

On April 15, a violent F4 tornado struck the western, northern, and northeastern suburbs of Birmingham, Alabama, with the worst damage occurring in McDonald Chapel, killing 25 people and injuring 200 others. An additional long-tracked F2 tornado traveled 46.8 miles through the northern suburbs of Atlanta northwest of Marietta, Georgia.

=== April 26–29 ===
FU	F0	F1	F2	F3	F4	F5
0	3	8	5	2	0	0

An outbreak of 18 tornadoes hit the Great Plains and the Mississippi Valley. Early on April 28, a long-tracked F3 tornado hit Alexandria and De Witt, Nebraska, injuring one. Later, a fatal F1 tornado struck southwest of Sunrise Hills, Illinois, killing two. The next day, an F3 tornado hit Barton, and Walnut Corner, Arkansas. The final tornado of the outbreak then touched down and became an F1 tornado that tracked through rural Hopkins County, Kentucky, injuring one. Overall, the outbreak killed two and injured two.

== May ==
There were 79 tornadoes confirmed in the United States in May.

=== May 9 ===
FU	F0	F1	F2	F3	F4	F5
0	2	0	1	0	0	0

An F2 tornado moved directly through Hartford, Michigan with no casualties. Elsewhere, a brief, but rare and damaging F0 tornado injured one in the El Sereno neighborhood northeast of Downtown Los Angeles. Another F0 tornado tracked 10.2 miles through the southeastern suburbs of Kennewick, Washington without causing any casualties.

=== May 12–14 ===
FU	F0	F1	F2	F3	F4	F5
0	4	4	9	0	2	0

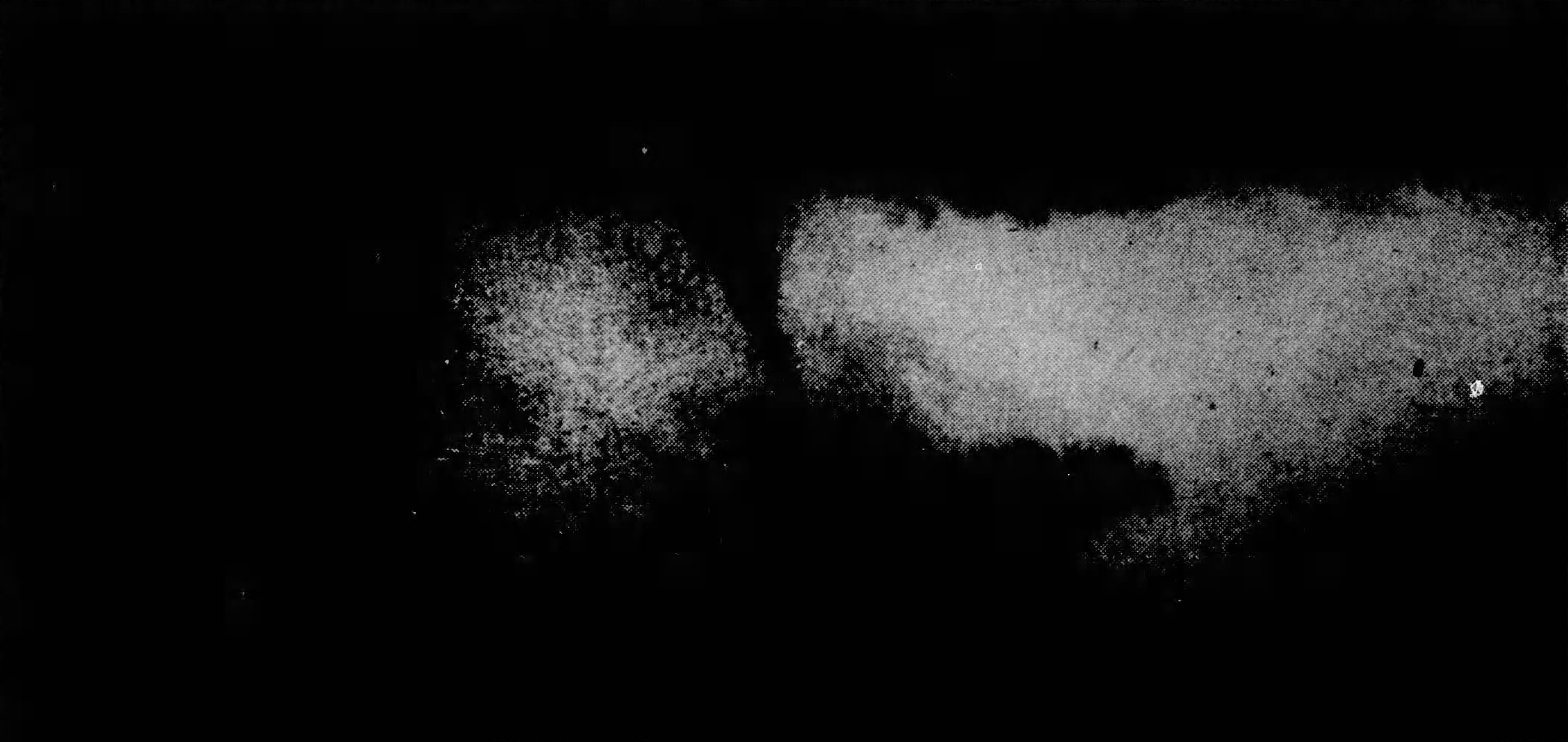
A large tornado in Flint, Michigan on May 12.

A deadly outbreak sequence of 19 tornadoes struck Michigan, Nebraska, Pennsylvania, Missouri, and Texas. It started with an outbreak of 10 tornadoes in Michigan on May 12, a large, 800 yard wide F2 tornado hit the eastern side of Ithaca, killing one and injuring four. This was followed by an F2 tornado that hit Hubbardston, injuring three. An F1 tornado then injured one near Laingsburg. Later, twin F2 tornadoes hit the far northwestern Detroit suburb of Wixom, injuring five apiece. The worst tornado of the outbreak then touched down in Downtown Flint before striking the Southeastern suburbs of Flint at F4 intensity, killing three and injuring 116. This was followed by another F4 tornado tore through the southern Detroit suburbs of Allen Park, Lincoln Park, and Ecorse before presumably moving into Canada south of Windsor, Ontario, injuring 22.

Three nighttime F2 tornadoes then struck areas near Pittsburgh. The first one hit the town of Aliquippa northwest of Pittsburgh just before midnight. The second one hit West Mifflin and Duquesne southeast of Pittsburgh just after midnight on May 13, injuring five. The final F2 tornado than hit areas north of Windber, injuring one. The final tornado of the outbreak was an isolated F1 tornado that hit areas north-northwest of Miles, Texas.

In the end, the outbreak caused four fatalities and 162 injuries.

== June ==
There were 65 tornadoes confirmed in the United States in June.

=== June 1 ===
FU	F0	F1	F2	F3	F4	F5
0	0	6	1	0	0	0

A brief F1 tornado struck a circus in rural Worcester County, Massachusetts, injuring 14. Six other tornadoes touched down in Massachusetts, Maine, Colorado, and Idaho, including an F2 tornado in rural Morgan County, Colorado.

=== June 6 ===
FU	F0	F1	F2	F3	F4	F5
0	1	2	2	0	1	0

An outbreak of six tornadoes hit Nebraska and Kansas. The strongest tornado was an F4 tornado that hit Pleasanton, Nebraska, although there were no casualties, a pilot flew his jet through the tornado and managed to survive with only an injury. However, an F2 tornado passed west of Geneva and east of Strang, while moving through rural Fillmore County, Nebraska, injuring three. Another F2 tornado southwest of both Denton and Lincoln, Nebraska then injured one. This was followed by an F1 tornado in rural Lancaster County, Nebraska that also injured one. Overall, the outbreak as a whole injured five.

== July ==
There were 92 tornadoes confirmed in the United States in July.

=== July 1 ===
Scattered tornado activity affected several states from Oklahoma to New York. In Wisconsin, a narrow, but strong F2 tornado traveled 10.6 miles through Door County. Barns and garages were destroyed, and the roof was removed from a grocery store in Brussels. A steeple blew off during a Sunday morning church service in Sturgeon Bay. Trees were blown over and uprooted, including one which blocked Wisconsin Highway 57. An F1 tornado in Oklahoma also caused an injury.

=== July 12–13 ===
FU	F0	F1	F2	F3	F4	F5
0	3	7	4	0	0	0

Over a two-day period, 14 scattered tornadoes touched down across the US. July 12 saw an F2 tornado hit Marienthal and Modoc, Kansas, killing one. The next day, an F1 tornado injured eight just northeast of Barrington, New Jersey in the southeastern suburbs of Philadelphia. Another F2 tornado northeast of Verona, Kentucky, injured 12. Overall, the tornadoes killed one and injured 20.

== August ==
There were 42 tornadoes confirmed in the United States in August.

=== August 5 ===
FU	F0	F1	F2	F3	F4	F5
0	1	0	0	1	0	0

An early morning F3 tornado hit Girard, Ohio and the northwest side of Youngtstown, killing two people. That afternoon, an F0 tornado hit Medina, North Dakota with no casualties.

=== August 25 (Soviet Union) ===
FU	F0	F1	F2	F3	F4	F5
0	0	2	1+	0	0	0

A group of long-tracked, F2 tornadoes caused severe damage along an 80 kilometres (50 mi) path that was up to 200 to 350 metres (220 to 380 yd) wide in the Naro-Fominsk region near Moscow.

=== August 30 ===
FU	F0	F1	F2	F3	F4	F5
0	1	1	1	1	0	0

An F3 tornado touched down on the north side of Fargo, North Dakota before hitting the suburban towns of Oakport and North River, injuring eight. Other tornadoes touched down in Minnesota, Missouri, and Illinois.

== September ==
There were 16 tornadoes confirmed in the United States in September.

== October ==
There were 29 tornadoes confirmed in the United States in October.

=== October 29–30 ===
FU	F0	F1	F2	F3	F4	F5
0	0	8	3	4	1	0

A late-season outbreak of 16 tornadoes impacted the Midwest. It began on October 29, when twin F2 tornadoes touched down near Mento, Kansas, with no casualties. Nebraska, however, received the brunt of the tornado activity. A weak, but long-tracked F1 tornado then traveled 99.8 miles through six counties, hitting the towns of Comstock, Royal, and Creighton. Farther southwest, a large, long-tracked, violent F4 traveled for 147.7 miles through five counties, carving a quarter mile wide swath of destruction just east of Downtown North Platte, injuring two. Later, yet another long-tracked F3 tornado hit four counties on 65.5 mile path, striking Wilsonville and Loomis before lifting right before hitting the southwest side of Kearney.

Back in Kansas, in F1 tornado injured two in rural Edwards County. Next, a quarter-mile wide F3 tornado moved through rural Pawnee County. Later, an F3 tornado struck Wolf Creek, injuring two. An F3 tornado, then moved right through Great Bend, injuring one. The final tornado of the outbreak occurred on October 30, when an isolated and brief F1 tornado touched down southwest of Morrison, Oklahoma with no casualties. Overall, the damaging outbreak injured seven.

== November ==
There were 7 tornadoes confirmed in the United States in November.

=== November 20–21 ===
FU	F0	F1	F2	F3	F4	F5
0	0	0	4	0	0	0

An unusual series of F2 tornadoes struck Oklahoma and Massachusetts. On November 20, an F2 tracked through areas west of Pumpkin Center, Oklahoma southeast of Muskogee. The next day, three F2 tornadoes struck Massachusetts. The first one briefly touched down in Clinton on the Wachusett Reservoir. The second one struck the town of West Newbury. The third one briefly touched down between Westwood and Canton. Despite causing heavy damage, there were no casualties from any of the tornadoes.

== December ==
There were 9 tornadoes confirmed in the United States in December.

=== December 4 ===
FU	F0	F1	F2	F3	F4	F5
0	2	0	4	0	0	0

A small, but damaging outbreak of six tornadoes struck Kansas and Missouri. The day started with an F0 tornado injuring one in rural Kingman County, Kansas just after noon. Awhile later, another person was injured by a second F0 tornado on the north side of Wathena, Kansas. The rest of the tornadoes (all of which were rated F2) happened in Missouri. The first one hit the west side of La Due, injuring two. The next one moved through rural Bates County southwest of the town of Ballard, injuring another two. The third one moved through Saline County, striking the eastern side of Slater near the end of its journey. The final tornado was a large one that passed near the towns of Hallsville, Centralia, and Thompson. Overall, the outbreak injured six people, although there were no fatalities.

=== December 23 ===
FU	F0	F1	F2	F3	F4	F5
0	0	1	1	0	0	0

The final two tornadoes of 1956 were two long-tracked tornado in Alabama and Georgia. The first was an F2 tornado that touched down near Frisco City, Alabama before proceeding northeastward through Burnt Corn, Fowler, Fort Deposit, the southern and eastern suburbs of Montgomery and Tallassee, finally lifting on the southwest side of East Tallassee. It injured one person on its 121.7 mile path. The second tornado touched down east-northeast of West Point, Georgia. The F1 tornado then proceeded east-southeastward to northwest side of Pine Mountain before turning northeast and White Sulphur Springs and Concord, injuring another person on its 45.3 mile path. In the end, the two tornadoes injured two people.

== See also ==
- Tornado
  - Tornadoes by year
  - Tornado records
  - Tornado climatology
  - Tornado myths
- List of tornado outbreaks
  - List of F5 and EF5 tornadoes
  - List of North American tornadoes and tornado outbreaks
  - List of 21st-century Canadian tornadoes and tornado outbreaks
  - List of European tornadoes and tornado outbreaks
  - List of tornadoes and tornado outbreaks in Asia
  - List of Southern Hemisphere tornadoes and tornado outbreaks
  - List of tornadoes striking downtown areas
  - List of tornadoes with confirmed satellite tornadoes
- Tornado intensity
  - Fujita scale
  - Enhanced Fujita scale
