= Saugatuck Dunes State Park =

Park in Michigan, USA

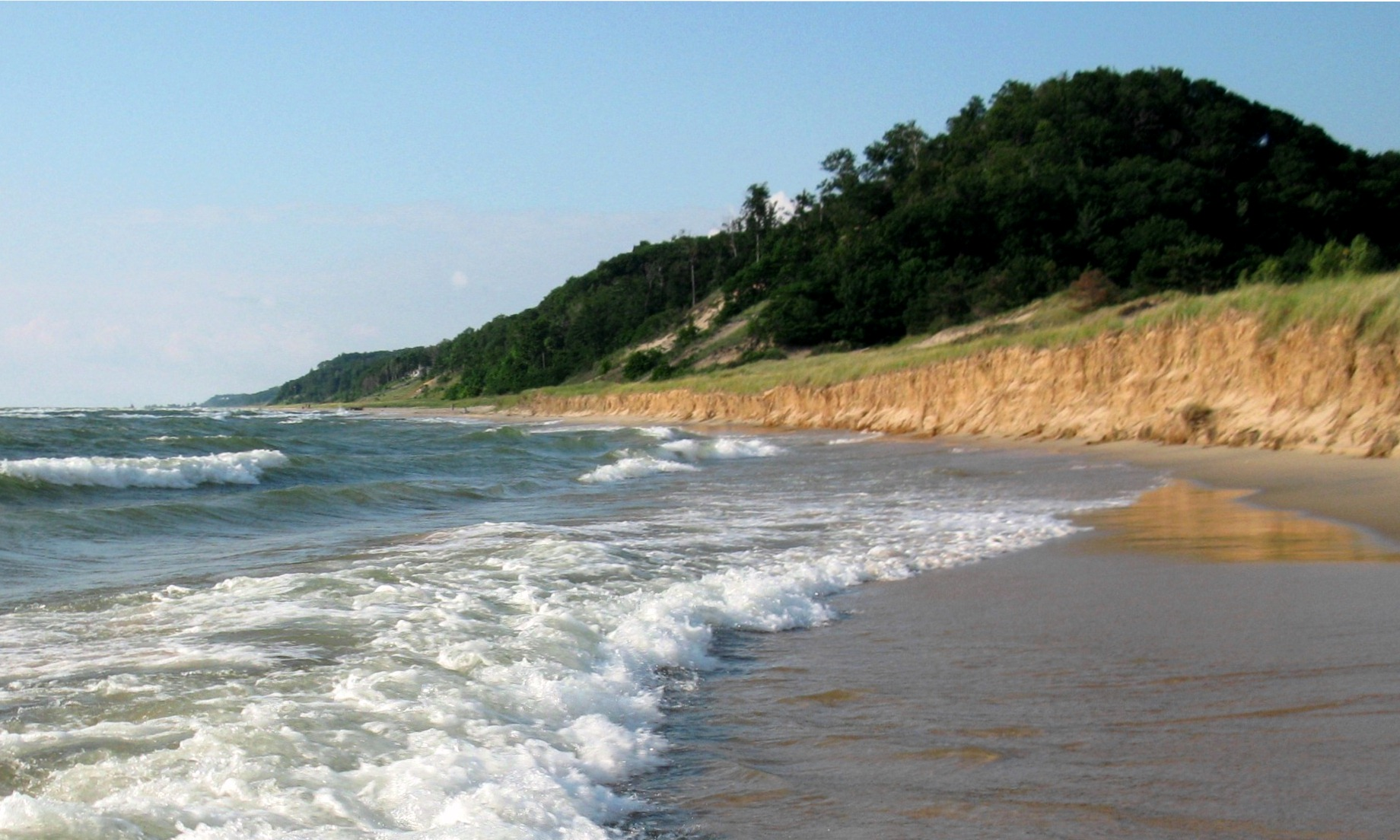
- Shoreline and a large wooded sand dune.

- Location within Michigan Location within the United States
- Location: Laketown Township, Allegan County, Michigan, United States
- Nearest city: Saugatuck, Michigan
- Coordinates: 42°42′12″N 86°11′59″W
- Area: 1,000 acres (400 ha)
- Elevation: 669 feet (204 m)
- Established: 1977
- Administrator: Michigan Department of Natural Resources
- Designation: Michigan State Park
- Website: Official website

Saugatuck Dunes State Park is a public recreation area covering 1,000 acres (400 ha) on the shore of Lake Michigan between Saugatuck and Holland in Allegan County, Michigan.

== History ==
The site was once part of the estate of the inventor of the comptometer Dorr E. Felt, whose summer home, the Felt Mansion, built in 1928, is an in-holding within the state park that is undergoing restoration. The Felt's summer home was sold to the St. Augustine Seminary, at which Pope Leo XIV was educated, in 1949 and used as housing for young students. Later on the mansion housed cloistered nuns. In the 1970s, the building was purchased by the state of Michigan and used as a state police post, with nearby buildings serving as a prison. The state completed purchasing the site for state park purposes in 1978.

== Activities and amenities ==
The largely undeveloped state park features 14 miles (23 km) of hiking trails, 200-foot-high (61 m) sand dunes covered with trees and grass, and 2.5 miles (4.0 km) of beachfront located two-thirds of a mile from the picnic parking area.
