= Newark, Wisconsin =

Town of Newark
- Town
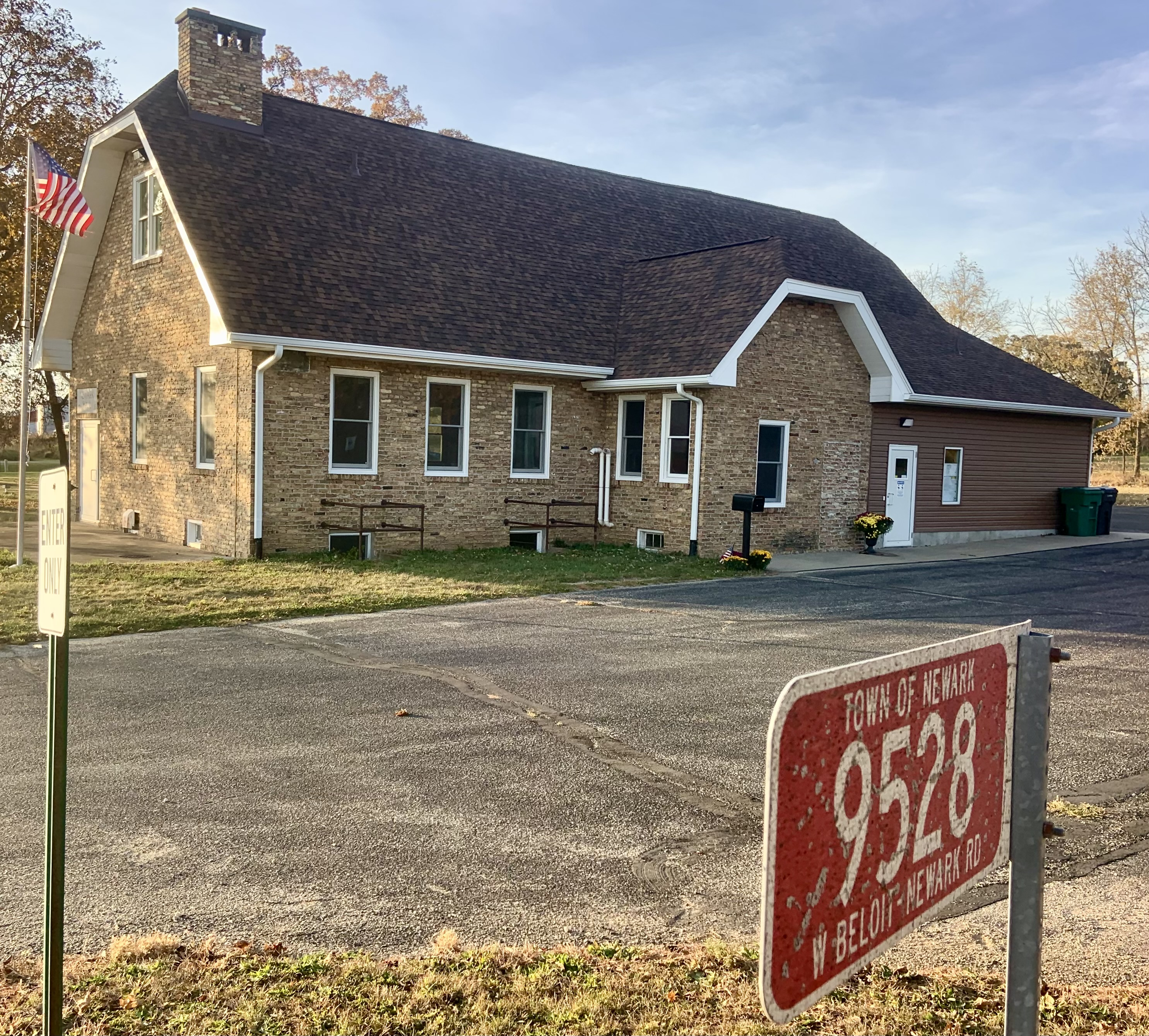
- Town hall

- Location of the Town of Newark in Rock County and the state of Wisconsin.
- Coordinates: 42°32′5″N 89°10′47″W
- Country: United States
- State: Wisconsin
- County: Rock

Area
  - Total: 36.4 sq mi (94.2 km^{2})
  - Land: 36.4 sq mi (94.2 km^{2})
  - Water: 0 sq mi (0.0 km^{2})
- Elevation: 810 ft (247 m)

Population (2020)
  - Total: 1,510
  - Density: 41.5/sq mi (16.0/km^{2})
- Time zone: UTC-6 (Central (CST))
  - Summer (DST): UTC-5 (CDT)
- Area code: 608
- FIPS code: 55-56325
- GNIS feature ID: 1583797
- Website: https://www.newarkwi.gov/

The Town of Newark is located in Rock County, Wisconsin, United States. The population was 1,510 at the 2020 census. The unincorporated community of Newark is located in the town.

== Geography ==
According to the United States Census Bureau, the town has a total area of 36.4 square miles (94.2 km^{2}), all land.

== Demographics ==
As of the census of 2000, there were 1,571 people, 566 households, and 476 families residing in the town. The population density was 43.2 people per square mile (16.7/km^{2}). There were 578 housing units at an average density of 15.9 per square mile (6.1/km^{2}). The racial makeup of the town was 98.41% White, 0.13% African American, 0.13% Asian, 0.32% from other races, and 1.02% from two or more races. Hispanic or Latino of any race were 1.02% of the population.

There were 566 households, out of which 32.2% had children under the age of 18 living with them, 75.4% were married couples living together, 4.4% had a female householder with no husband present, and 15.9% were non-families. 12.4% of all households were made up of individuals, and 5.7% had someone living alone who was 65 years of age or older. The average household size was 2.75 and the average family size was 2.97.

In the town, the population was spread out, with 24.9% under the age of 18, 5.4% from 18 to 24, 25.8% from 25 to 44, 32.3% from 45 to 64, and 11.6% who were 65 years of age or older. The median age was 42 years. For every 100 females, there were 106.4 males. For every 100 females age 18 and over, there were 102.4 males.

The median income for a household in the town was $59,500, and the median income for a family was $60,817. Males had a median income of $42,414 versus $28,458 for females. The per capita income for the town was $21,964. About 3.1% of families and 3.9% of the population were below the poverty line, including 3.1% of those under age 18 and 6.0% of those age 65 or over.

== Notable people ==
- Halvor Cleophas (1842–1937), Wisconsin State Representative and farmer
- Dorr E. Felt (1862–1930), Inventor of the Comptometer and of the Comptograph, co-founder of the Felt & Tarrant Manufacturing Company
- Eugene K. Felt (1838–1915), Wisconsin State Representative
