= St. Augustine Seminary High School =

Former high school seminary in Michigan, U.S.

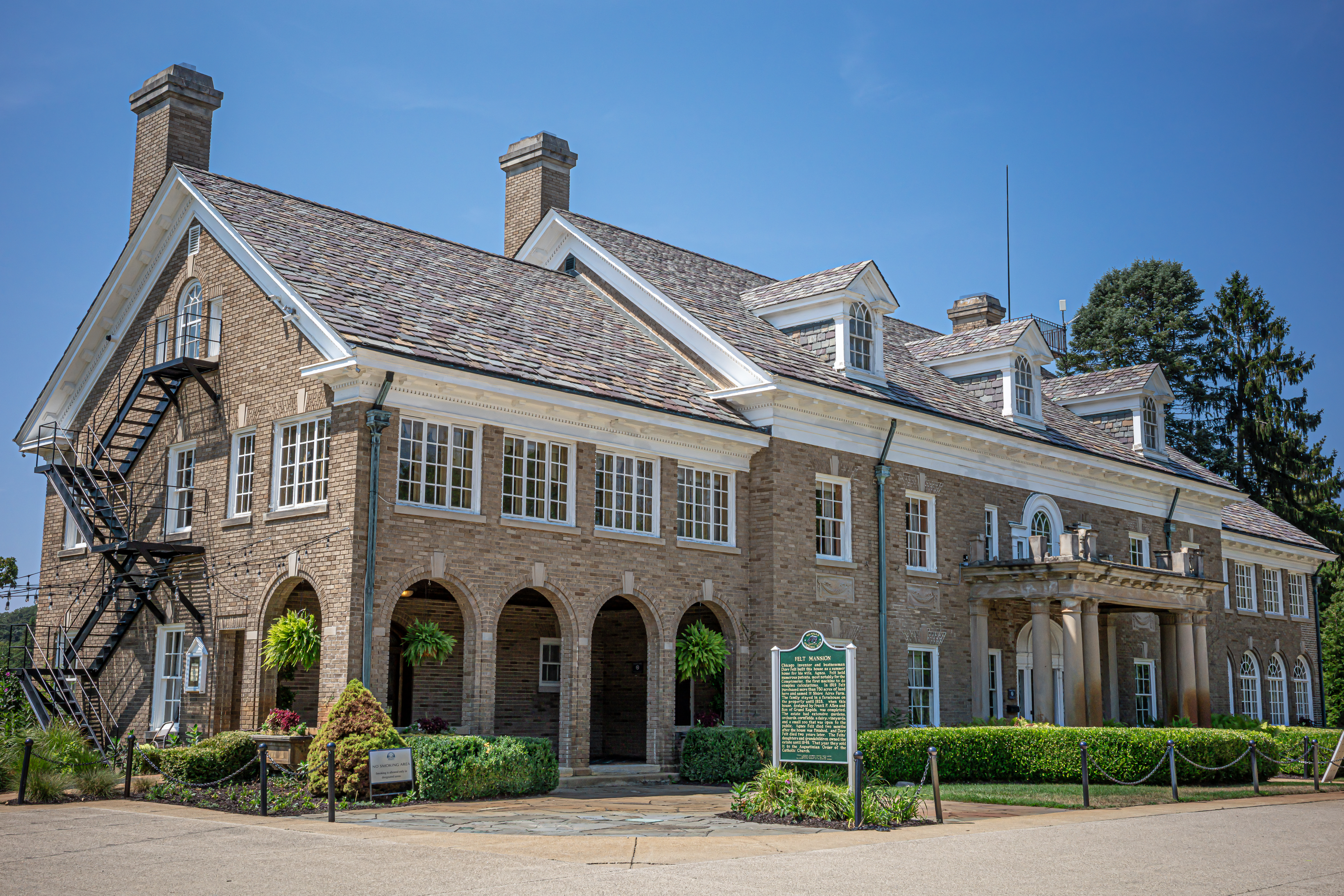

Location
- 6597 138th Ave; Holland, Michigan, U.S.
- Coordinates: 42°41′49″N 86°11′37″W

Information
- Religious affiliation: Catholic
- Established: 1949
- Founders: Order of Saint Augustine
- Closed: 1977
- Grades: High school
- Gender: Boys
- Campus size: 550 acres

St. Augustine Seminary High School was a Catholic high school seminary that operated on the estate of the Dorr E. Felt Mansion from 1949 to 1977 in Holland, Michigan. It was run by the Order of Saint Augustine. Initially a boarding school only, it later admitted day students. It closed due to declining enrollment in 1977, and the seminary buildings were demolished. Pope Leo XIV attended the high school, graduating in 1973.

== History ==
The property of the seminary was originally known as Shore Acres, and was the 900-acre (360 ha) estate of Dorr Felt. In 1925, Felt constructed a mansion on the coast of Lake Michigan, but it was unused by 1931. The property was sold to the Order of Saint Augustine in the summer of 1949, who began using it as a seminary the following fall. In the beginning, the ballroom of the mansion was used as a dormitory, filled with bunk beds holding around 90 students.

A four-story, 135,000 square feet (12,500 m^{2}) seminary building was constructed for $3 million ($31.1 million in 2025) in 1964, which housed classrooms, dormitory space, a recreation room, library, and a chapel. Peak enrollment of 180 students was reached in 1965.

Freshmen students were required to wear red-and-white caps in the presence of upperclassmen. Student life included sports such as baseball. Students of the high school came from Wisconsin, Illinois, Indiana, and Michigan. Around 75% of students came from the Chicago metro area.

From 1968, the Felt estate housed cloistered Augustinian nuns from Spain. In 1969, the seminary began to admit non-seminarian lay boys as day students, and hired their first instructor who was a lay woman. Seventy-one students were enrolled in 1974, and eighty were enrolled in 1975.

By 1977, there were only 40 students at the institution. With decreasing enrollment and rising costs, the Augustinians chose to sell the property. Remaining students were transferred to one of four other Augustinian high schools in the Midwest, and the high school program closed in June 1977. Over one thousand students attended the institution during its lifetime. The nuns remained at the property until moving to St. Louis in 1978.

The Michigan State Police announced plans to purchase the property for use as a prison in 1977. The seminary buildings were torn down and the Dunes Correctional Facility was built on the property, opening in 1978 alongside Saugatuck Dunes State Park. The prison was closed in 1991, and Laketown Township purchased the site for a nominal price of $1. The Felt Manor itself was later purchased and restored as an educational site.

== Notable alumni ==
- Robert Prevost—the future Pope Leo XIV—attended the high school, graduating as co-valedictorian in 1973. During his time at the high school, Prevost was the editor-in-chief of the yearbook and secretary of the student council. He also was on the debate, tennis, and bowling teams.
- Robert Dodaro; editor of the Augustinus-Lexikon and academic

== Rectors ==
- Fr. Raymond Ryan (1965–1967)
- Fr. Andrews
- Fr. John Peck
- Fr. Michael O'Connor
