= Eugene K. Felt =

American politician

Eugene Kincaid Felt (April 11, 1838–July 21, 1915) was a member of the Wisconsin State Assembly a lower part of Wisconsin Legislature.

== Biography ==
Felt was born on April 11, 1838, in Webster, New York. He would attend Beloit College before working as a farmer in Newark, Wisconsin. On May 16, 1861, Felt married Libbie Morris. They would have eight children, including Dorr Felt, inventor of the comptometer.

== Political career ==
Felt was a member of the Assembly from 1872 to 1873. Additionally, he chaired the town board (similar to city council) of Newark and was a county supervisor of Rock County, Wisconsin. In 1888, he was a delegate to the Kansas State Republican Convention.
