= Dorr E. Felt Mansion =

Historic house in Michigan, United States

- U.S. National Register of Historic Places
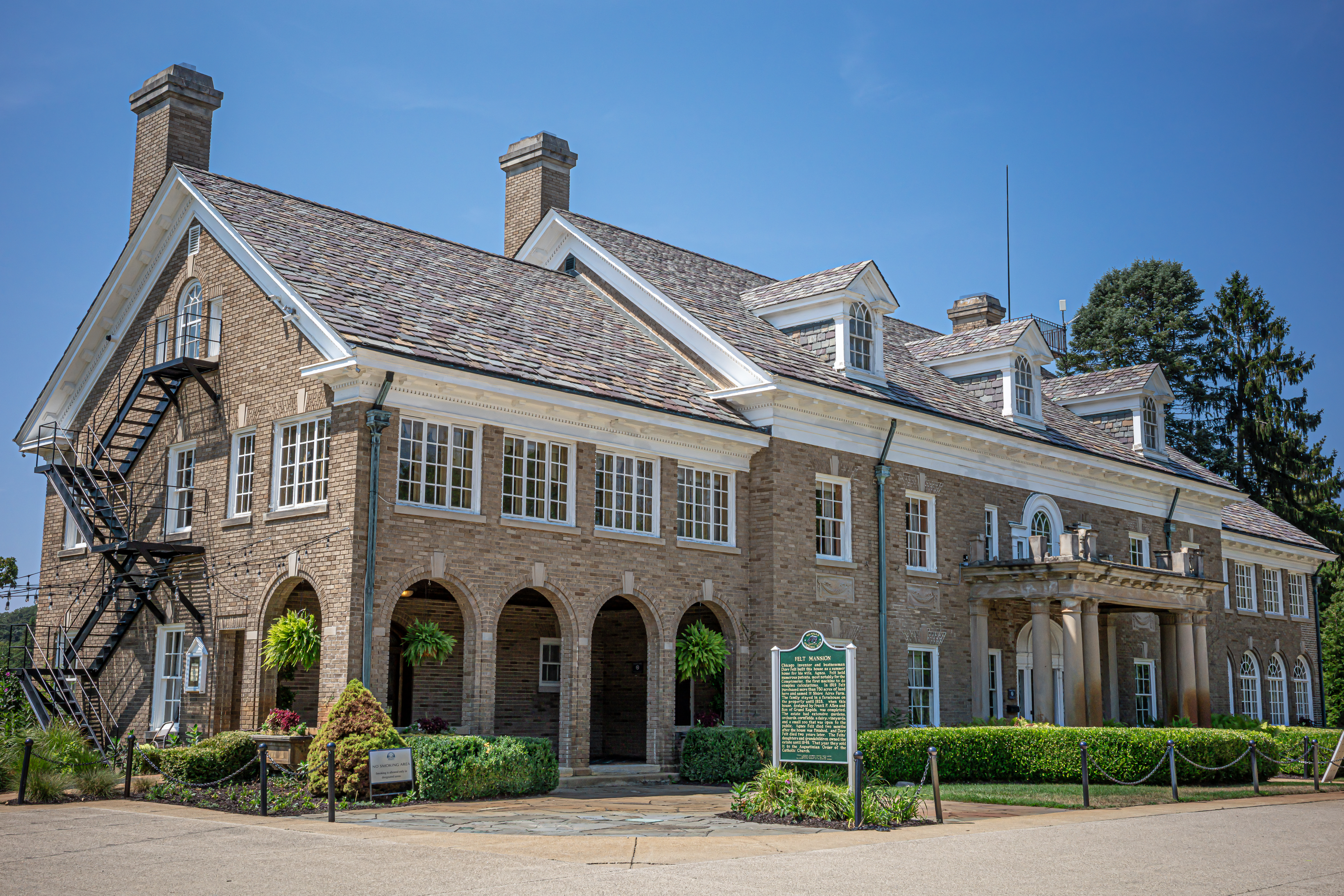

- Location within Michigan Location within the United States
- Interactive map
- Location: 6597 138th Ave; Holland, Michigan, U.S.
- Coordinates: 42°41′49″N 86°11′37″W
- Area: 3 acres (1.2 ha)
- Built: 1927
- Architect: Frank P. Allen & Son
- Architectural style: Classical Revival
- NRHP reference No.: 96001418
- Added to NRHP: December 12, 1996

The Felt Mansion is a house located at 66th Street and 138th Avenue, in Laketown Township, Michigan near Saugatuck, Michigan. It was listed on the National Register of Historic Places in 1996.

== History ==
Dorr Felt was born in 1862 near Beloit, Wisconsin. At eighteen, he moved to Chicago, becoming a foreman at a rolling mill. In 1885, he hit upon the idea of constructing a calculating machine to aid the shop's accountants. He eventually developed and patented his machine, and in 1889 opened a factory. His company was successful, and Felt also served in a number of prominent positions in government and business groups.

=== Felt Mansion ===
Felt married Agnes McNulty in 1891 and the couple had four daughters. The couple first visited the area in the early 1900s as tourists, and fell in love with the area. Starting in 1919, they began acquiring land in the area, and in 1926 purchased the lots where this house now stands. At the time, the Felts lived in a modest farmhouse on the site, which has since been demolished.

In 1927, the Felts hired the Grand Rapids architectural firm of Frank P. Allen & Son to design this summer house. Construction began in July 1927, and was completed in 1928. In August 1928, Agnes Felt suddenly died at the estate. Dorr Felt remarried the next year, but his new wife preferred living in Chicago to the summer estate. Dorr Felt died in August 1930. The mansion was left to his children, who kept it until 1949, when it was sold to the Chicago Province of the Augustinian friars.

=== Seminary ===
The Felt Mansion became the St. Augustine Seminary High School, a minor seminary, in 1949. The mansion served as a chapel and housed both friars and students. In 1962 the friars leased the mansion to a community of cloistered nuns of their Order. In 1963 the Order constructed a large building on the Felt Estate to house the seminary. This building contained a chapel and housing for the friars as well as for students in grades 9–12. The school operated until 1977, when dropping enrollment forced the friars to close it.

=== Prison ===
In 1977 the Felt Estate was purchased by the State of Michigan. The State then used the Felt Mansion as a state police post and converted the school building into the Saugatuck Dunes Correctional Facility.

=== Historic Site ===
The prison was closed in 1991. In 1995 the state sold 44 acres of the Estate, including the mansion and prison building, to Laketown Township for $1, stipulating that the mansion be preserved and that it be owned and operated by the public. The Friends of the Felt Estate formed in 2002 and began restoration of the house and grounds. The property is listed in the National Register of Historic Places.

== Description ==
The Felt Mansion is a three-story, gable-roof, rectangular plan brick mansion. It is constructed of steel beams with a concrete and wire mesh lath, and sits on a concrete foundation. The roof is made of concrete slabs supported by steel trusses, and is covered with slate tiles. The main body of the house is six bays wide, flanked by slightly recessed four-bay wide wings. Exterior walls are clad in yellow brick, with prominent decorative limestone window sills, keystones, and panels between the first-floor and second-floor windows. The front entry is covered with a limestone portico. A variety of windows are used through the house, with one-over-one, double-hung windows on the main body, round-arch windows on the first floor of the wings, and three-part wooden casement windows on the second story.

The interior has a central hall with rooms symmetrically arranged around it. The northern portion of the house contained the dining room with a kitchen and pantry, a small library, and a sun porch. The south portion had a large solarium in the front of the house and a living room in the rear. A central staircase leads to the second floor, the south side held family rooms, including a master suite with a bedroom, an anteroom with a walk-in cedar closet, a sun porch, and a tiled bathroom. Additional bedrooms for children and guests take up most of the remaining space, and the north side had sleeping quarters for servants. The third floor contained a ballroom.

== Notable Figures ==
- Dorr E. Felt, American inventor and industrialist
- Pope Leo XIV, born Robert Francis Prevost, attended St. Augustine Catholic Seminary.

== Legend ==
According to local urban legend, the forest around the Felt Mansion is a place where melon heads lived.
