= Bell Punch =

Bell Punch Company Ltd
- Company type: Manufacturing
- Founded: 5 July 1878
- Defunct: Early 1980s
- Headquarters: 51.54367°N 0.48973°W, Uxbridge, England
- Products: Business machines
- Number of employees: 2 000 (1961)
- Parent: Control Systems Ltd (from 1927)

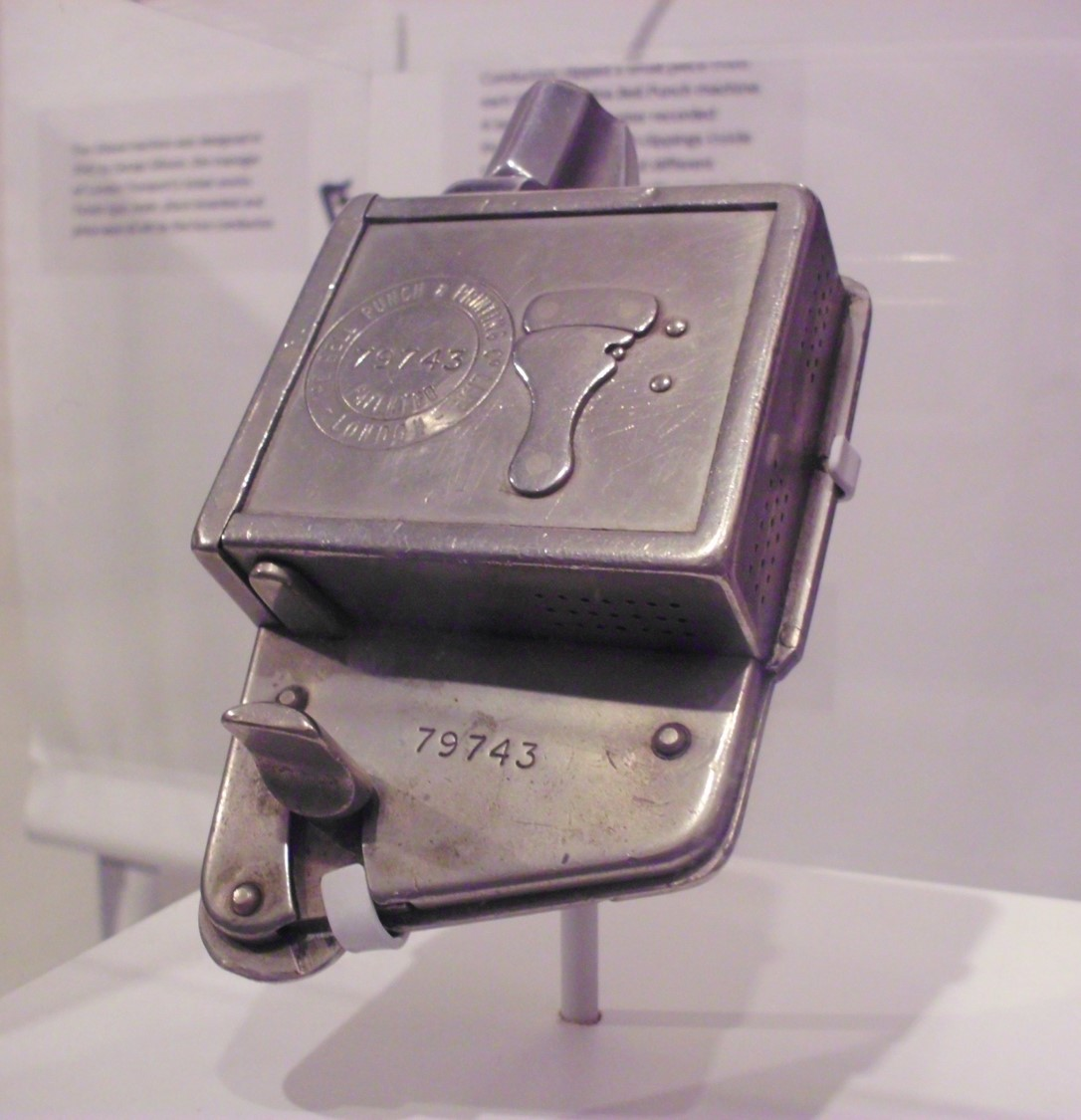
BELL PUNCH ticket machine

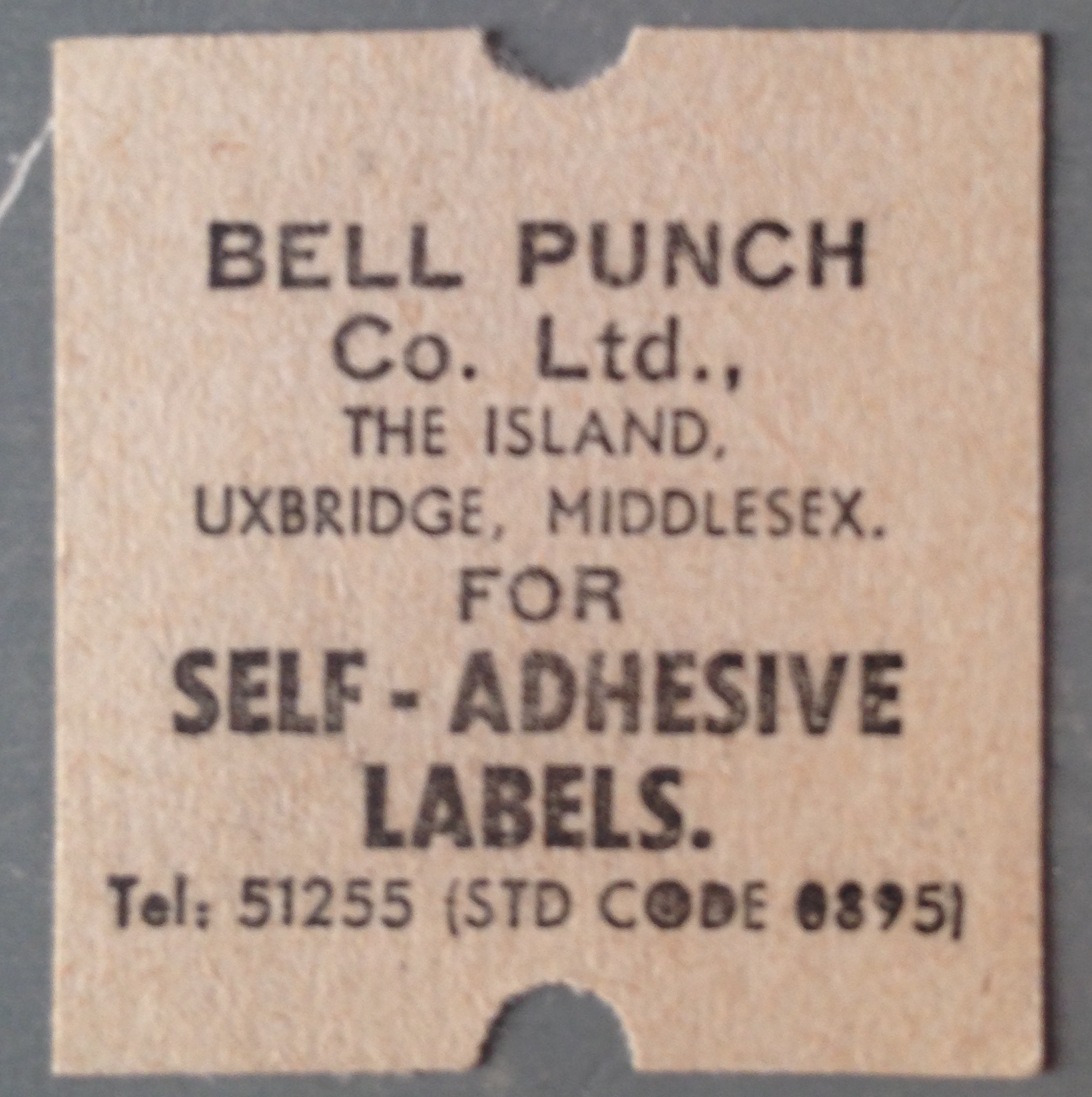
Verso of a Bell Punch tram ticket, circa 1970

The Bell Punch Company was a British company manufacturing a variety of business machines, most notably several generations of public transport ticket machines and the world's first desktop electronic calculator, the Sumlock ANITA.

== History ==
The company was established in July 1878 in order to acquire the patent rights to an American hand-registering ticket punch that was being used by a number of British tramway companies. By 1884 they had begun development of their own range of ticket printing machines. In 1891 they began supplying ticketing machines for London General Omnibus Company. From then until its demise, Bell Punch had an unbroken history of supplying successive London bus companies, along with many other bus operators throughout the country.

The first half of the twentieth century saw the company expand into different markets, including in cinema and theatre ticketing, horse race totalisator ticket machines, taximeters and mechanical calculators.

In the Second World War the company developed and manufactured a variety of military equipment, including mechanical aircraft navigation computers and naval gunnery sighting and ranging devices.

In 1958 it began development of a desktop electronic calculator, which came to market as the Sumlock ANITA in 1961. The calculator division was established as Sumlock Anita Electronics Ltd in 1966. It became the largest supplier of calculators in the UK, with sales of £4.5 million in 1971. In 1972 they developed one of the first electronic pocket calculators, but were beaten to the market by Sinclair Radionics due to lack of management enthusiasm for the project. In 1973 Sumlock Anita Electronics were acquired by Rockwell International who closed down the operation in 1976.

The remainder of the business continued to be owned by the then parent company, Control Systems Ltd which was acquired by the Swedish Incentive Group in the early 1980s which resulted in the break-up of the company.
