= Comptometer =

Key-driven mechanical calculator

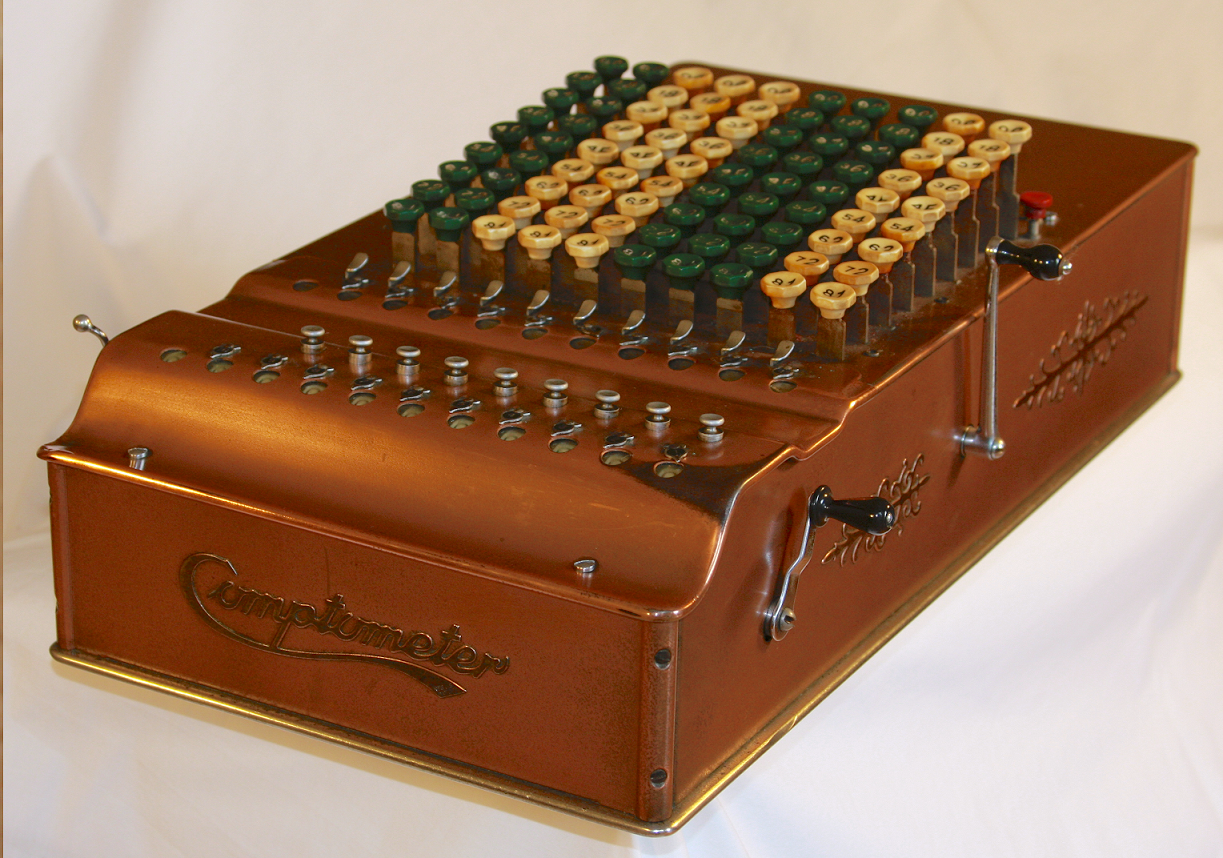
Model ST (1930s)

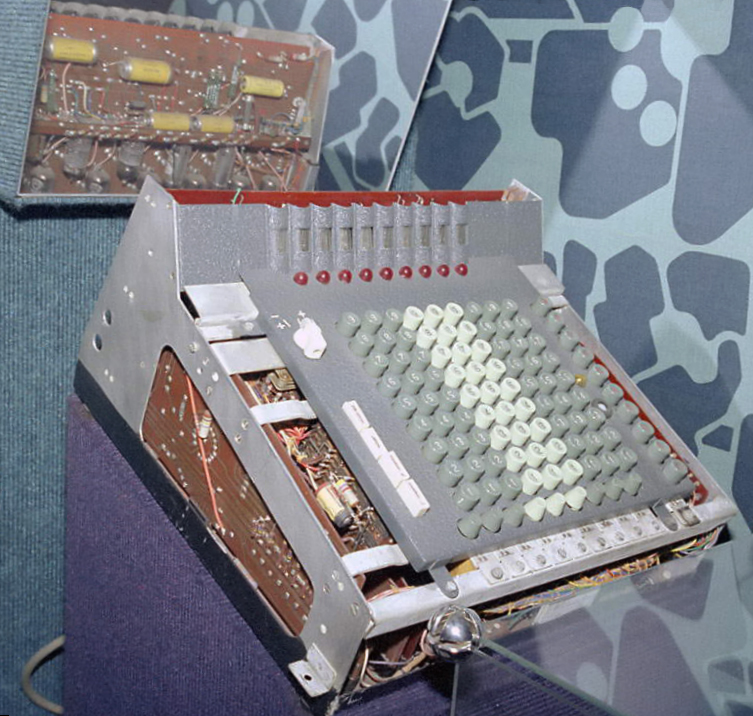
Prototype of the first all-electronic desktop calculator marketed by Sumlock Comptometer Ltd of the UK

The comptometer was the first commercially successful key-driven mechanical calculator, patented in the United States by Dorr Felt in 1887.

It was a key-driven calculator that was extremely fast because each key adds or subtracts its value to the accumulator as soon as it is pressed. A skilled operator can enter all of the digits of a number simultaneously, using as many fingers as required, making them sometimes faster to use than electronic calculators. Consequently, in specialized applications, comptometers remained in use in limited numbers into the early 1990s, but with the exception of museum pieces, they have all now been superseded by electronic calculators and computers.

Manufactured without interruption from 1887 to the mid-1970s, it was constantly improved. The mechanical versions were made to be faster and more reliable. A line of electro-mechanical models was added in the 1930s. It was the first mechanical calculator to receive an all-electronic calculator engine in 1961, with the ANITA Mark VII model released by Sumlock Comptometer. This created the link between the mechanical calculator industries and the electronic.

Although the comptometer was primarily an adding machine, it could also do subtractions, multiplication and division. Its keyboard consisted of eight or more columns of nine keys each. Special comptometers with varying key arrays were produced for a variety of special purposes, including calculating currency exchanges, times and Imperial weights. The name comptometer was formerly in wide use as a generic name for this class of calculating machine.

== History ==
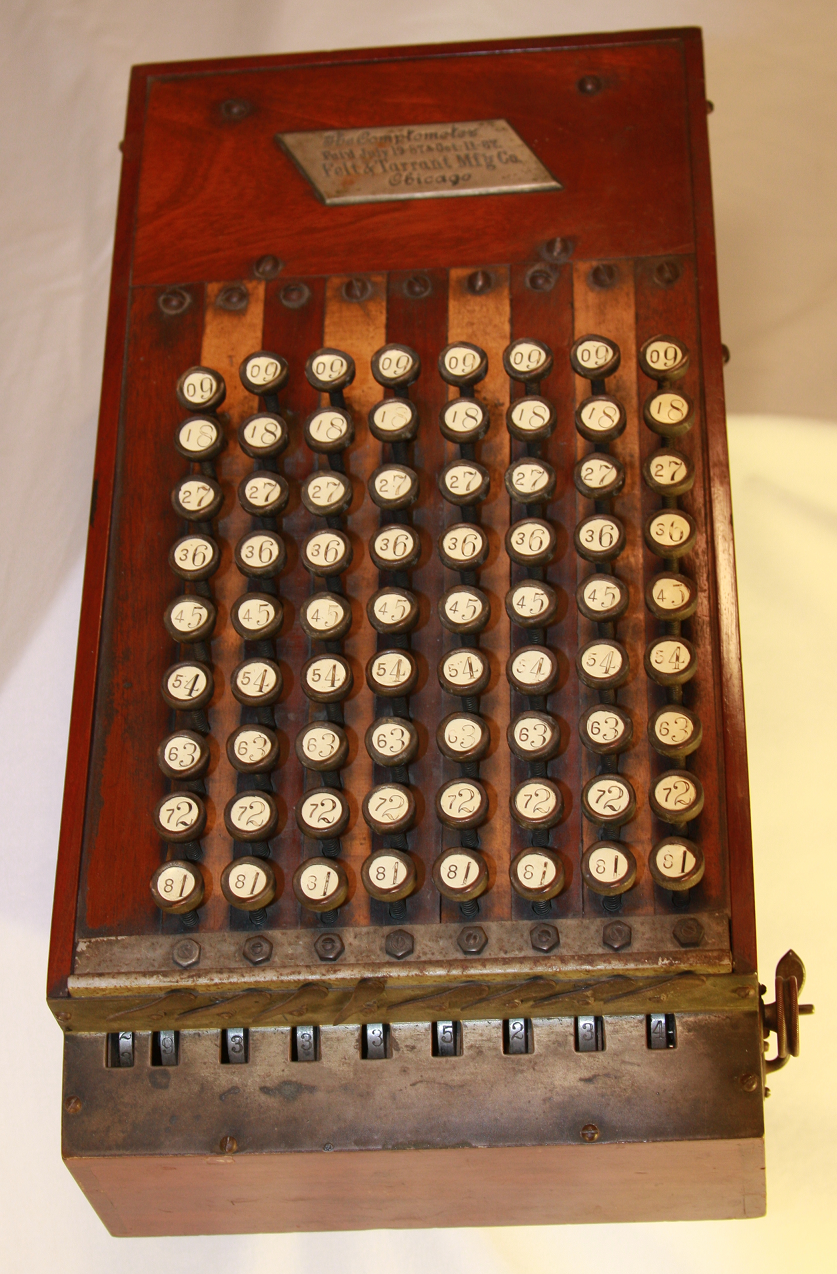
An early machine (1887)

=== Origins ===
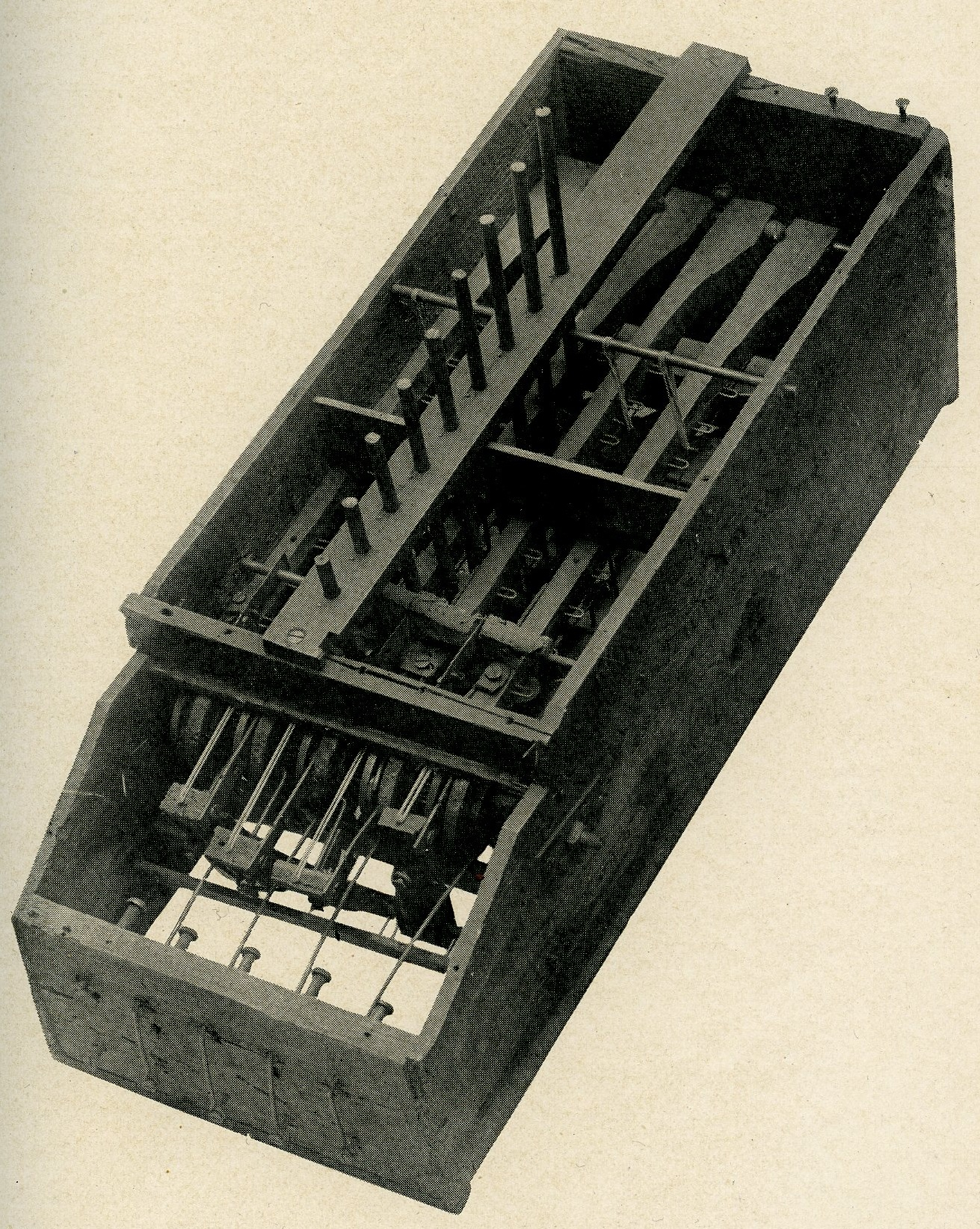
The macaroni box (1885)

The comptometer is the direct descendant of the key-driven machine of Thomas Hill patented in the United States in 1857 and of the Pascaline invented by Blaise Pascal in France in 1642. By just replacing the input wheels of the Pascaline by the columns of keys of Hill's machine, the comptometer was invented. Addition is performed exactly the same way, and both the Pascaline and the Comptometer make use of the 9's complement method for subtraction, but in the case of the comptometer it is the operator who must choose the right keys for the subtrahend (each key has its 9's complement written in miniature letter next to it).

=== The first comptometers ===
Dorr Felt began his work on the comptometer in 1882 and started building the first prototype during the American Thanksgiving holidays of 1884. Because of his limited amount of money, he used a macaroni box for the outside box, and skewers, staples and rubber bands for the mechanism inside. It was finished soon after New Year's Day, 1885. This prototype, called the macaroni box, is in the Smithsonian Institution in Washington, D.C., United States.

Shortly after, Robert Tarrant, the owner of a Chicago workshop, gave Felt a salary of $6 a week, a bench to work on, and what would add up to $5,000 to build his first practical machine, which he finished on October 5, 1886.

By September 1887, eight production machines had been built.

=== Comptometer and comptograph ===
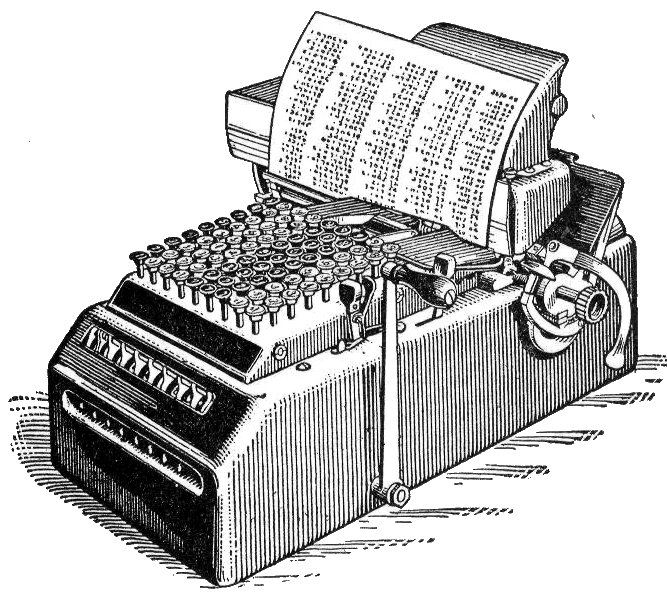
Comptograph (1914)

The original comptometer design was patented by the American Dorr E. Felt. The first two patents were granted on July 19, 1887 and on October 11, 1887.

Two years later, on June 11, 1889, he was granted a patent for the Comptograph. A Comptograph is a comptometer with a printing mechanism making it more like a key-set calculating machine (even though the keys are registered as they are typed and not when a handle is pulled), therefore slower and more complicated to operate. It was the first printing-adding machine design to use individualized type impression which made its printed output very legible.

The first comptograph was sold to the Merchants & Manufacturers National Bank of Pittsburgh, PA. in December 1889. It was the first sale of a recording-adding machine ever. This machine is now on display at the Smithsonian Institution in Washington, D.C..

The Felt & Tarrant Manufacturing Company built both comptometers and comptographs throughout the 1890s. In 1902, the Comptograph Company was set up to manufacture comptographs exclusively, but was shut down at the beginning of World War I.

Forty years later, in the mid-1950s, the Comptometer Corporation reused the name comptograph for a line of 10-key printing machines.

=== Competition ===
The comptometer was the first machine in production to challenge the supremacy of the arithmometer and its clones, but not immediately; it took almost three years to sell the first hundred machines.

Desktop Mechanical Calculators in production during the 19th century

== Companies and trademarks ==
Comptometer Pins

=== Felt & Tarrant Manufacturing Company ===
Felt and Tarrant signed a partnership contract on November 28, 1887. The partnership was incorporated as the Felt & Tarrant Manufacturing Company on January 25, 1889. The firm often used the abbreviation Felt & Tarrant Mfg Co in their logo on both their machines as well as in print, with the ampersand chosen over the word "and" as part of their official corporate name.

=== Comptograph Company ===
In 1902, Felt and Tarrant parted ways in creating a second company and decided to split the shares of both companies so that one would own the controlling interest of a company with 51% of the shares and the other would still share the profits with the remaining 49% of the shares. Felt became the majority owner of the Felt & Tarrant Manufacturing Company and Tarrant became the majority owner of the Comptograph Company. The Felt & Tarrant Manufacturing Company reabsorbed the Comptograph company at the beginning of World War I.

=== Comptometer Corporation ===
The Felt & Tarrant Mfg Co became public in 1947 and changed its name to the Comptometer Corporation in 1957.

=== Bell Punch Company – Sumlock Comptometer Ltd ===
In 1960, the Bell Punch Company bought the British rights to the Comptometer design and trademark, and continued its development. In 1961, Sumlock, a division of the Bell Punch Company, was renamed The Sumlock Comptometer Ltd and began marketing the first all-electronic desktop calculator, the ANITA Mark VII. The entire calculator division of the Bell Punch Company was bought by Rockwell International in 1973. They exited the calculator business in 1976 and shut down all operations.

=== Victor Comptometer Corporation ===
In 1961, the Comptometer Corporation merged with the Victor Adding Machine Company, and the two became the Victor Comptometer Corporation. After barely surviving the microprocessor revolution, it is still doing business today as Victor Technology LLC.

== Development ==
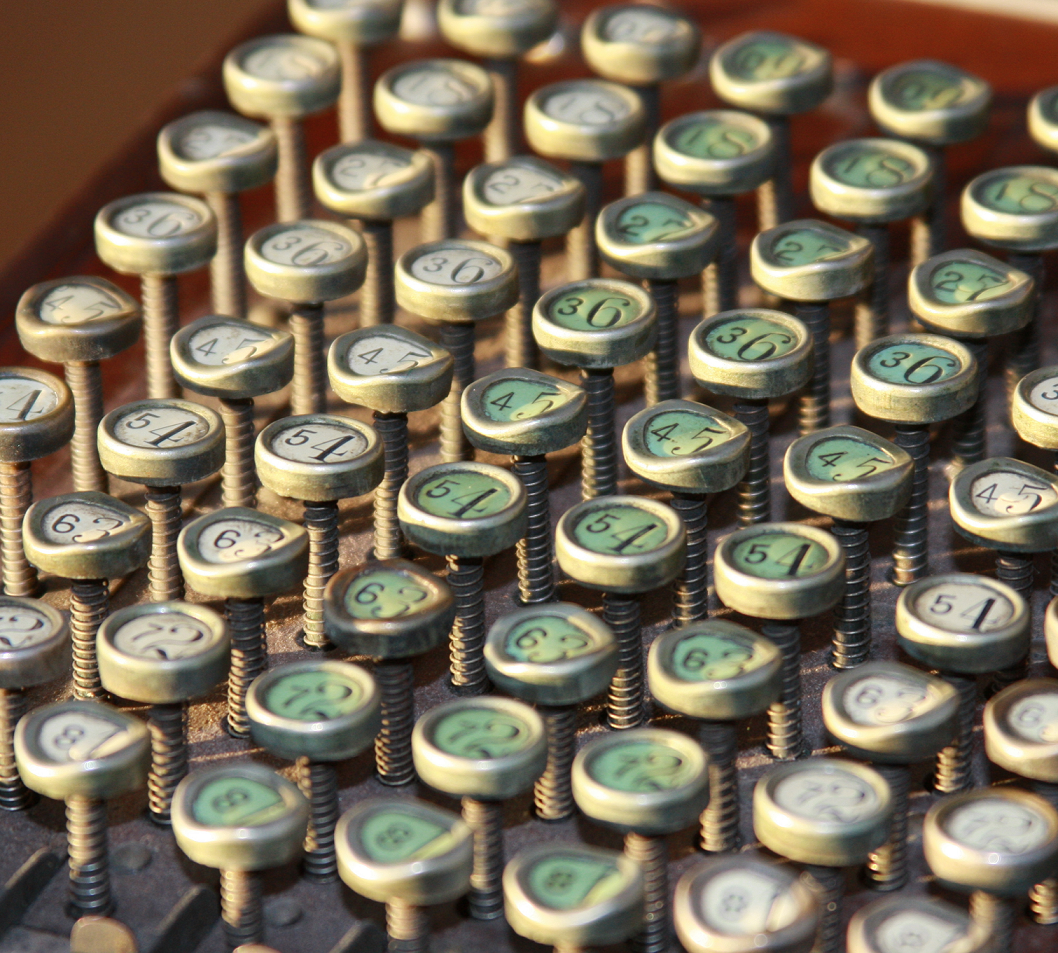
Keyboard of a woody (1895)

=== Wooden boxes ===
The first machines were built using wooden boxes, which made them lighter but more fragile. They were called the "woodies", and about 6,500 machines were built in between 1887 and 1903.

Two major improvements happened during the first years of production: the first was the insertion of carry inhibit push buttons for quicker operations of subtraction and the second was the color grouping of the columns of keys (three by three except for the first two columns that represent hundredths). Felt continually improved his machine with seven patents filed during the first ten years. These included the patents that he took for the Comptograph.

Each row of keys is differentiated from the one above and the one below by a different tactile feel: the even rows have round and raised keys and the odd rows have flat and oblong keys. The keys of the first machines, with their metal rims, are similar to the typewriters keys of the same period. Plastic keys were also introduced very early on but their rows do not have that tactile difference.

The woodies had a three-part zeroing mechanism: a lever, a lever stop, and a knob. In order to reset the machine, first push the lever toward the stop, start rotating the knob and release the lever as soon as the result numbers start to move. Continue rotating the knob until all the result numbers are reset.

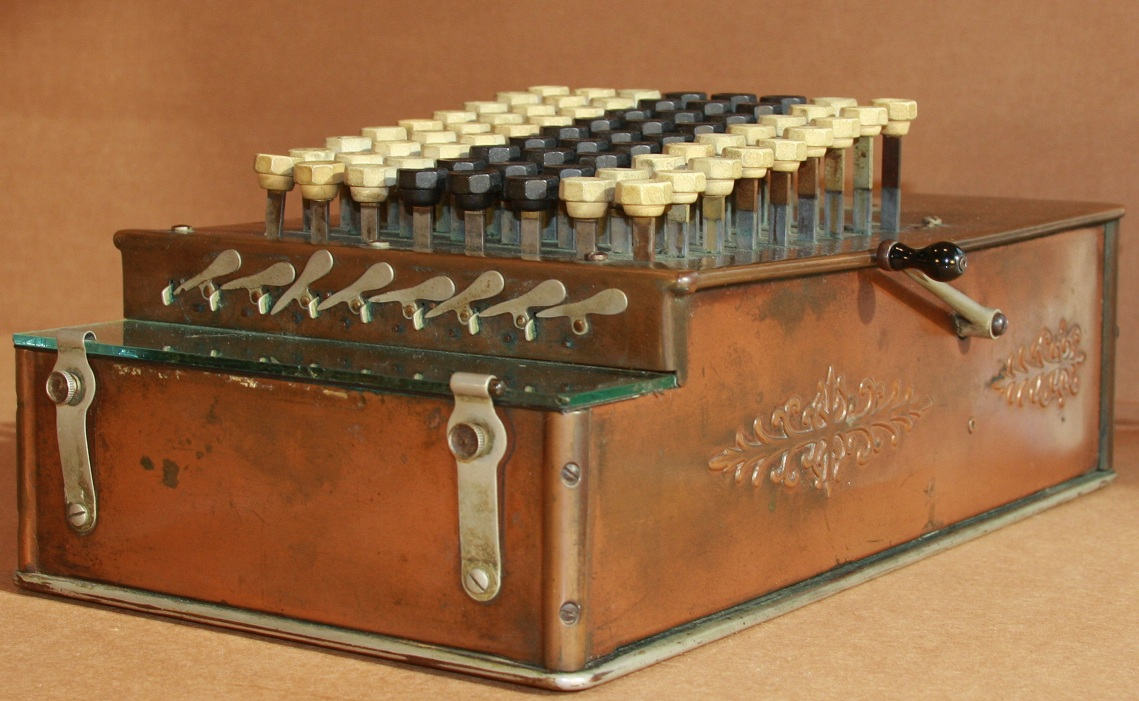
Model A (1905)

=== Model A ===
All the models, from this one on, have a metal casing, but the model A has a polished glass panel for the output display in the front. This model is produced from 1904 to 1906.

Described in patents 762,520 and 762,521, it introduces a new carry mechanism that reduces the power needed to operate the keys to one fourth of its predecessor's. It also introduces the duplex feature that allows for keys to be pressed simultaneously. And finally it introduces a simplified clearing mechanism that only requires one lever, and one back and forth motion of it, to reset the machine. "The machine gun of the office" as it was called in some World War I advertisements, was starting to develop the form and mechanism that it would keep for the next forty years.

=== Model B, C, D ===
These models are built from 1907 to 1915. They all have the shoebox metal casing that will be used until the end of World War II.

=== Model E ===
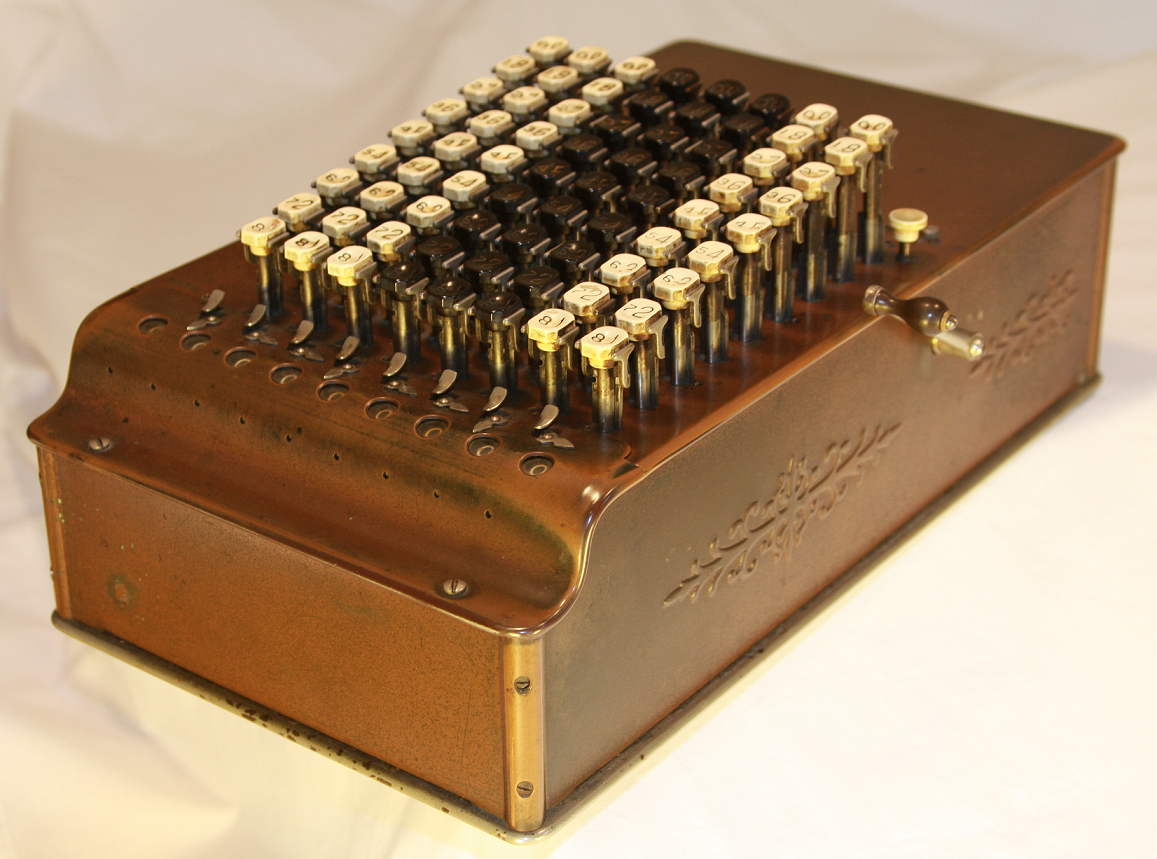
Model E "Controlled-Key" Comptometer with a white release key (1914)

Very few machines of this type were built, but all were made between 1913 and 1915. This was a transition machine that introduced the "Controlled-Key" safeguard, which was part of an error detection mechanism that blocked most of the keyboard if a key was not pressed enough to add its total to the result. When this mechanism was activated, all the columns of keys were blocked except for the one where the error occurred. Therefore, the operator could find the column in question, reenter the number and unlock the keyboard by pressing the release key in order to resume the operations.

Each key was supported by a metal plate that wrapped around it on three sides. This created a support that was used to block the key when the error detection mechanism was activated. The blocking mechanism was moved inside the box in the following models.

=== Model F ===
The production of this model started in 1915 and lasted five years. The error detection mechanism is moved inside the box and the release key is red. This machine is the last machine without the Comptometer logo inscribed on its front and back panels.

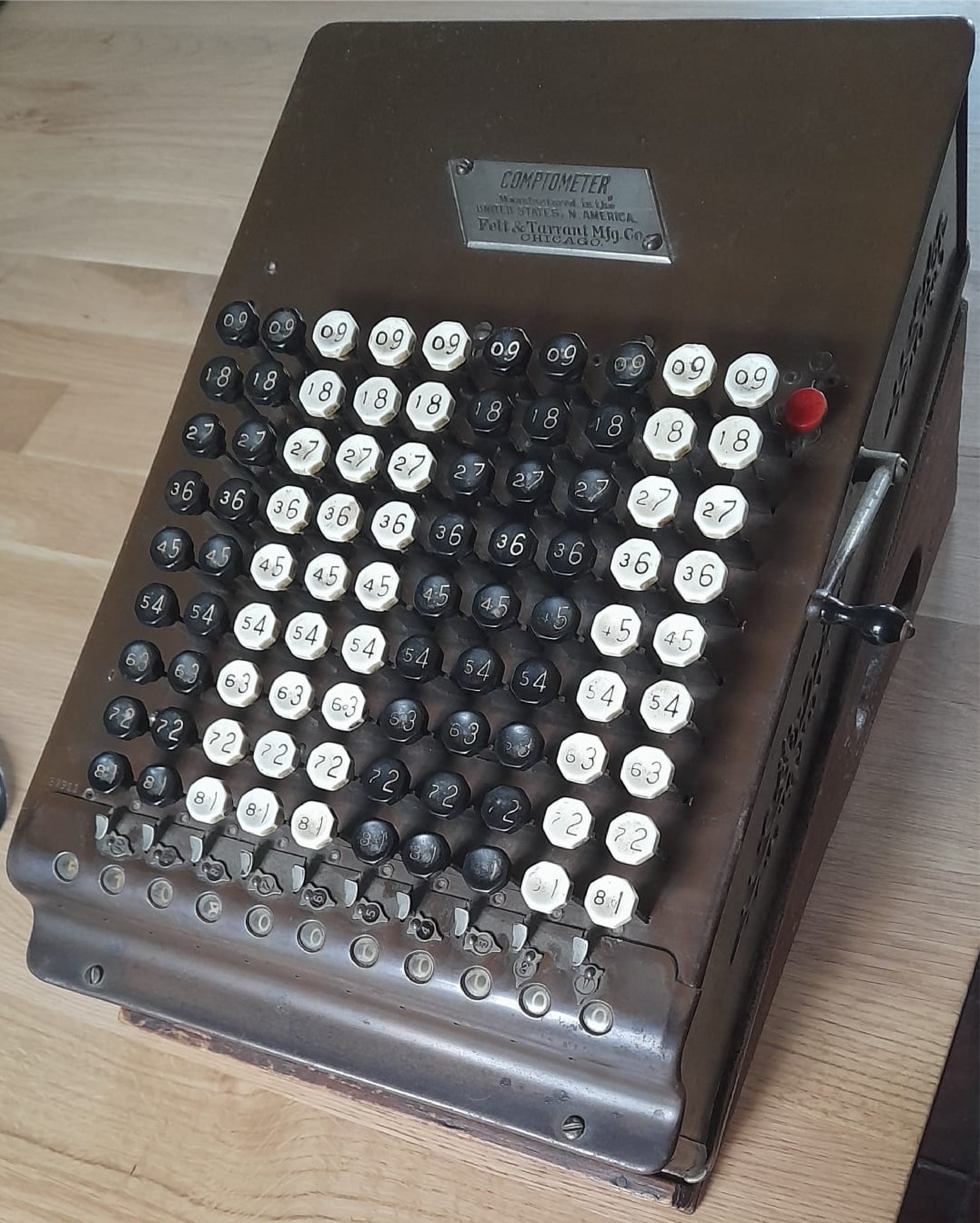
Model F, 10 columns, red "controlled key" (1915–1920)

=== Model H, J, ST ===
Manufactured from 1920 until the beginning of World War II, these models incorporate all of the improvements of the previous machines. The Comptometer logo is inscribed on their front and back panels and they have the red release key that was introduced with the previous two models.

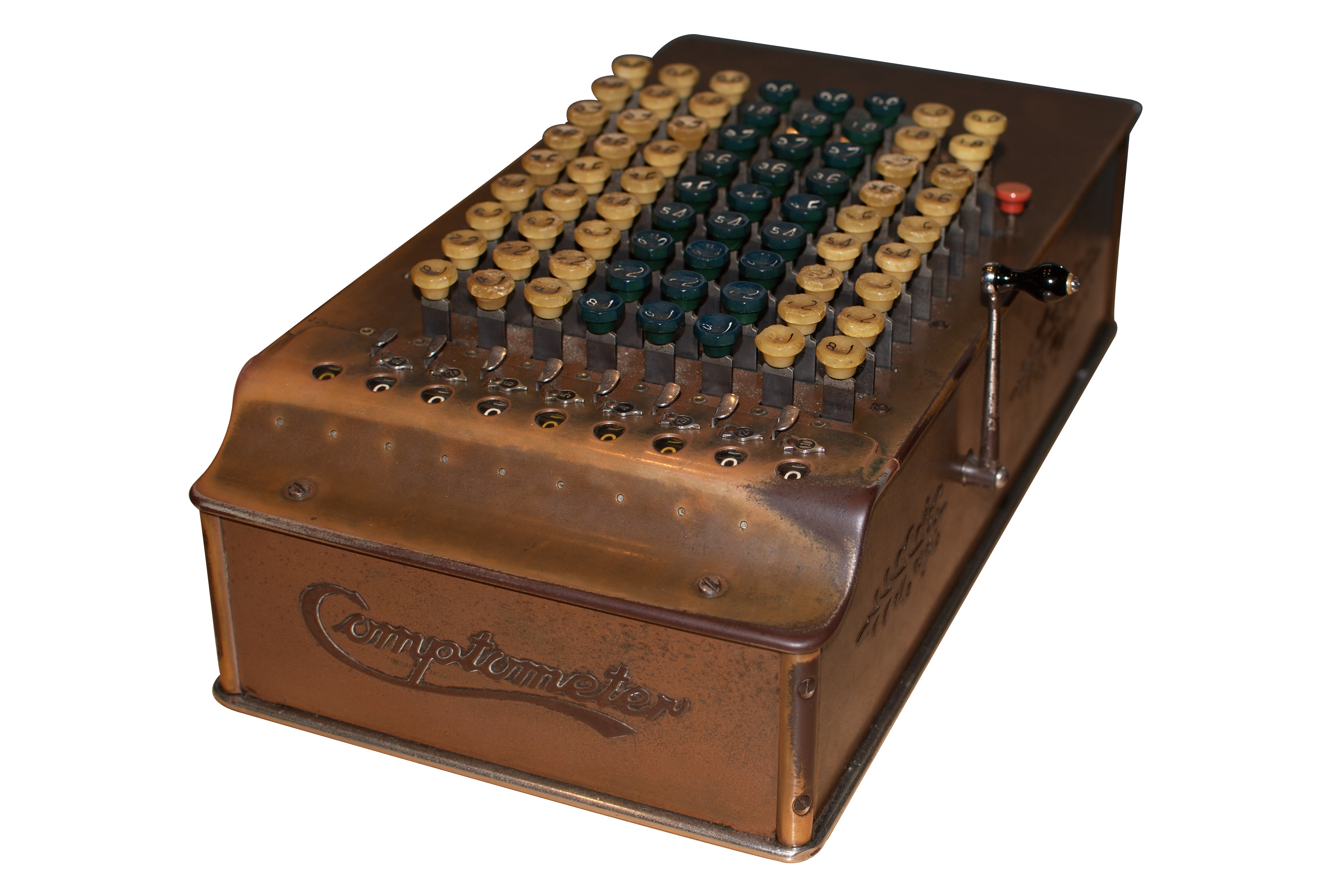
Model J (1930s)

The ST (SuperTotalizer) has two display output registers and two additional levers that allow for the creation of intermediate results. Each key pressed by the operator is added to the top display register creating an intermediate result which is added to the bottom display register when the operator activates the front right lever (it also resets it). The bottom display register accumulates the intermediate results until it is cleared by using the left lever.

These three models are the last of the shoebox design that was introduced in 1907 with the B model.

=== Model K ===
This electric model was introduced in the middle of the 1930s and had a very moderate success since the mechanical models were very easy to operate and less expensive to maintain.

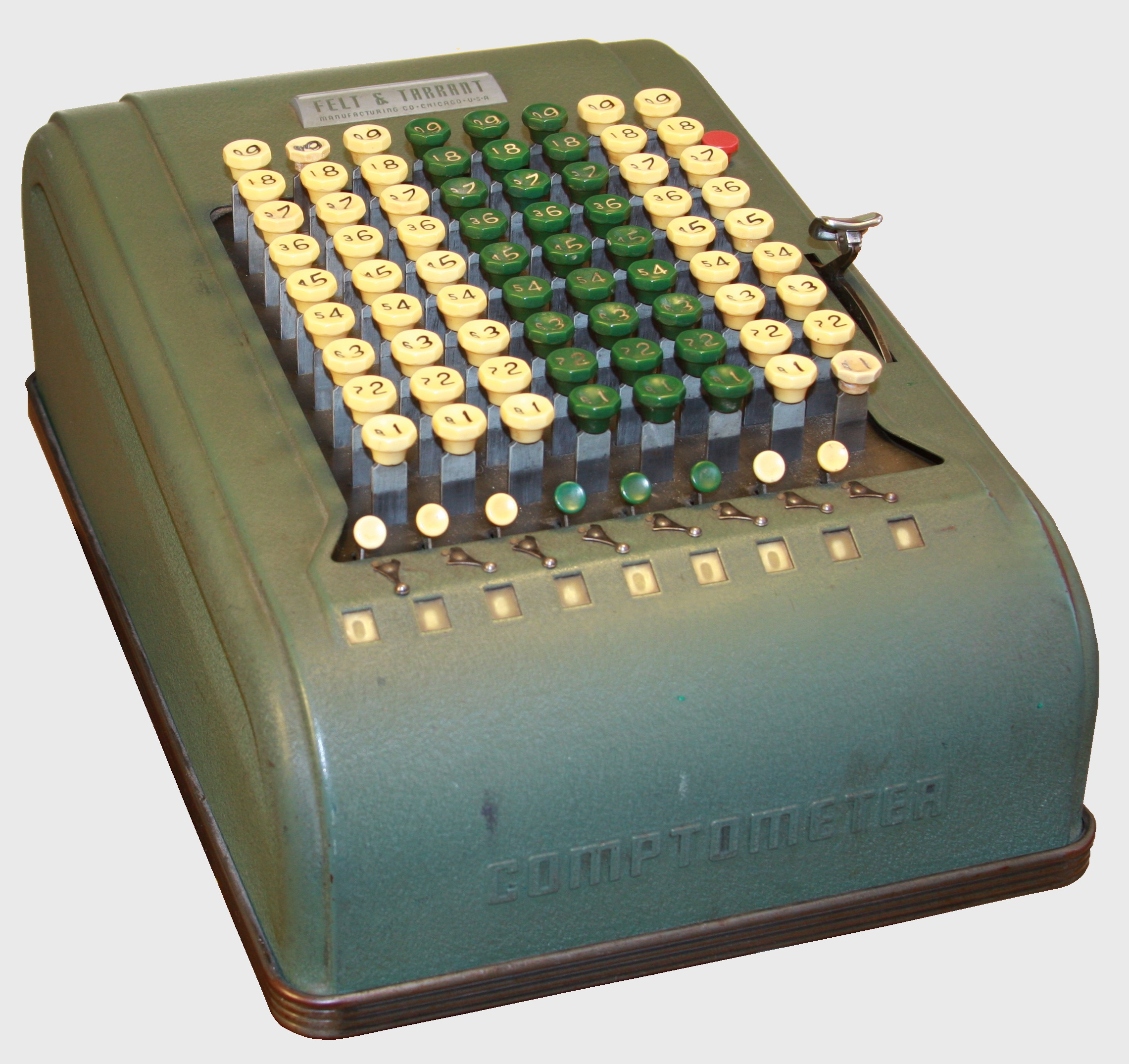
Model WM produced during World War II

=== Model M, WM ===
Introduced just before World War II, it had a new box design which was more symmetrical and rounder in shape. The WM was manufactured during World War II with a less wasteful use of material for the mechanism.

The WM had many aluminum parts which were more prone to failure so the use of steel was resumed as soon as steel again became available. While the machine was lighter, it was also weaker.

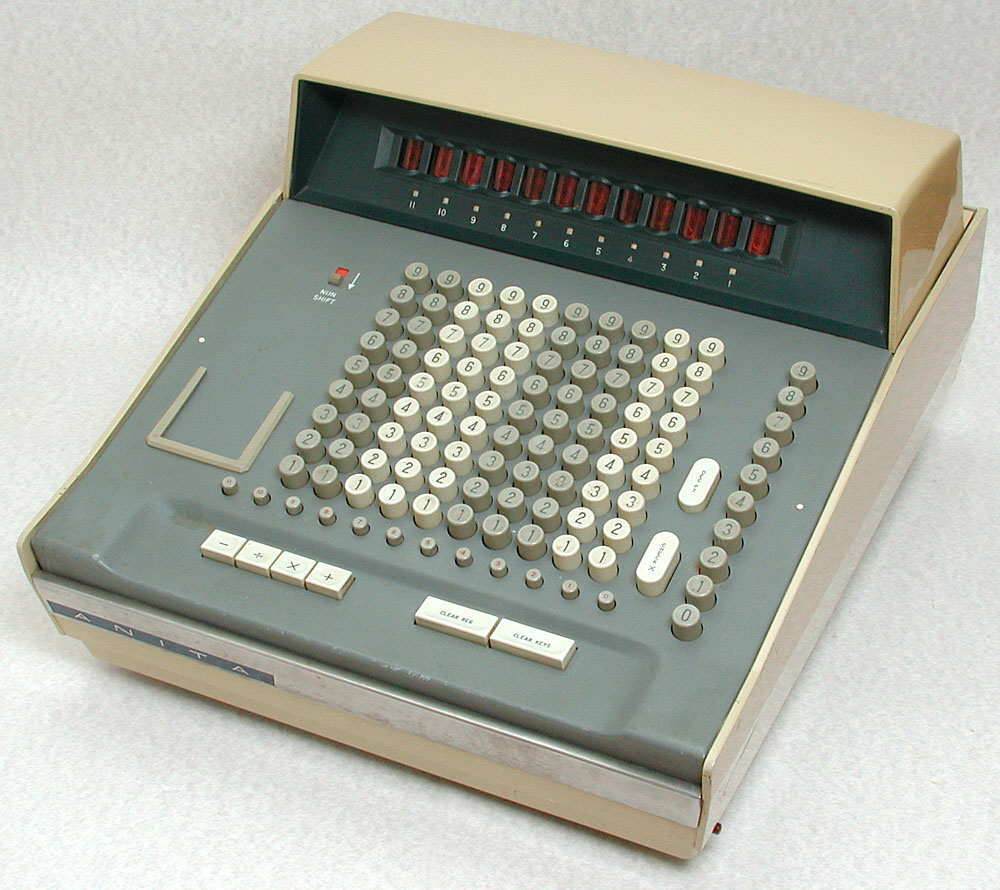
The ANITA mark VIII sold from 1962 in Britain

=== Post World War II models ===
The models become lighter with the use of aluminum and more refined inner mechanical designs. Both mechanical and electric models are offered. Their outside is similar to the model M machines. The model 3D11 succeeds to the model M and the electric model 992 succeeds to the model K. The major external appearance change of the 3D11 and 992 is that the keys were two tones of green with a fuller depth almost twice the old original style and that made identification easy. Also the lock release key (red) was moved from the upper right corner of the keyboard to the center and just below the "one" keys so it could be thumb operated. On model K electrics the motor was turned on with a switch and ran continuously during use. The 992 had a micro switch which started the motor at the start of any key depression and shut off after key action competed. This reduced the motor wear to almost zero.

The most important new designs of this period came from the Sumlock comptometer Ltd company that introduced the first all-electronic desktop calculators almost two years before the competition. They were the ANITA Mark VII, first introduced in 1961 and marketed in Continental Europe and the ANITA Mark VIII, a slightly improved design, introduced at the same time, marketed in Britain and the rest of the world. They both started shipping in 1962.

The last ANITA machine with a Comptometer keyboard was the ANITA mk 10 introduced in 1965, still using cold-cathode switching tubes and that will be replaced in 1968 by the ANITA mk 11, a 10 key machine.

Sharp's first all transistor desktop calculator, the CS-10A COMPET, introduced in the summer of 1964, also had a Comptometer type keyboard.

== See also ==
- Arithmometer
- Difference engine
- Genericized trademark
- Victor Technology LLC
- Z1 (computer)
