= Laketown Township, Michigan =

- Township
- Location within the state of Michigan
- Coordinates: 42°43′38″N 86°10′4″W
- Country: United States
- State: Michigan
- County: Allegan

Area
  - Total: 21.7 sq mi (56.1 km^{2})
  - Land: 21.5 sq mi (55.8 km^{2})
  - Water: 0.12 sq mi (0.3 km^{2})
- Elevation: 720 ft (220 m)

Population (2020)
  - Total: 5,928
  - Density: 255.5/sq mi (98.6/km^{2})
- Time zone: UTC-5 (Eastern (EST))
  - Summer (DST): UTC-4 (EDT)
- FIPS code: 26-45180
- GNIS feature ID: 1626585
- Website: www.laketowntwp.org

Laketown Township is a civil township of Allegan County in the U.S. state of Michigan. The population was 5,928 at the 2020 census.

== Communities ==
Castle Park is an unincorporated private community in the township, consisting of approximately 100 cottages and summer houses along Lake Michigan. It is situated on the former Castle Park estate of Michael Schwarz. Schwarz's brick, turreted castle-style house, built in 1890, now serves as the enclave's community center. There was a post office here from 1903 until 1953.

Macatawa is a small unincorporated community near Lake Michigan on Lake Macatawa that once was home to resorts catering to visitors from Chicago. Nearly all that remains of these resorts was destroyed in several fires. It is now home to primarily cottages. The community is on the boundary between Laketown Township in Allegan County and Park Township in Ottawa County; however, it is on the south side of Lake Macatawa separated from most of Park Township. Macatawa is located at 42°46′11″N 86°12′22″W. It has a "PO Box only" post office with the ZIP code of 49434.

Graafschap is a small unincorporated community, with areas in both Fillmore Township and Laketown Township.

== Geography ==
According to the United States Census Bureau, the township has a total area of 21.7 square miles (56.1 km^{2}), of which 21.5 square miles (55.8 km^{2}) is land and 0.12 square miles (0.3 km^{2}), or 0.47%, is water.

=== Points of interest ===
- Felt Mansion is a house located at 66th Street and 138th Avenue and was formerly the site of the St. Augustine Seminary High School, which Pope Leo XIV attended.

== Demographics ==
Historical population
Census	Pop.	Note	%±
1960	1,814		—
1970	2,175		19.9%
1980	4,332		99.2%
1990	4,888		12.8%
2000	5,562		13.8%
2010	5,505		−1.0%
2020	5,928		7.7%
Source: Census Bureau. Census 1960- 2000, 2010.

As of the census of 2000, there were 5,561 people, 2,080 households, and 1,591 families residing in the township. The population density was 257.1 inhabitants per square mile (99.3/km^{2}). There were 2,373 housing units at an average density of 109.7 per square mile (42.4/km^{2}). The racial makeup of the township was 96.04% White, 0.50% African American, 0.07% Native American, 0.88% Asian, 0.11% Pacific Islander, 1.51% from other races, and 0.88% from two or more races. Hispanic or Latino of any race were 3.70% of the population.

There were 2,080 households, out of which 34.8% had children under the age of 18 living with them, 69.4% were married couples living together, 4.5% had a female householder with no husband present, and 23.5% were non-families. 18.8% of all households were made up of individuals, and 6.2% had someone living alone who was 65 years of age or older. The average household size was 2.66 and the average family size was 3.07.

In the township the population was spread out, with 27.1% under the age of 18, 6.9% from 18 to 24, 27.7% from 25 to 44, 27.1% from 45 to 64, and 11.3% who were 65 years of age or older. The median age was 39 years. For every 100 females, there were 100.0 males. For every 100 females age 18 and over, there were 98.8 males.

The median income for a household in the township was $60,893, and the median income for a family was $69,440. Males had a median income of $46,698 versus $31,597 for females. The per capita income for the township was $29,377. About 1.3% of families and 2.8% of the population were below the poverty line, including 1.9% of those under age 18 and 4.4% of those age 65 or over.
