= Dorr Felt =

American inventor and industrialist (1862–1930)

Dorr E. Felt
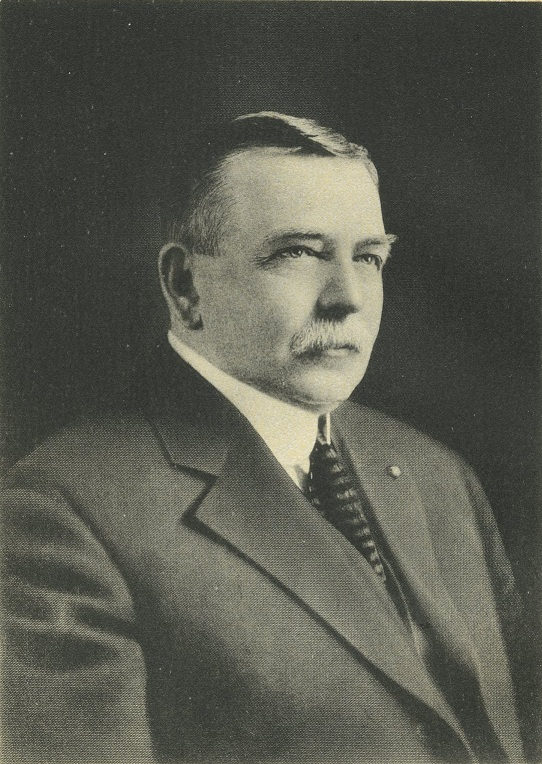
- Born: Dorr Eugene Felt; March 18, 1862; Beloit, Wisconsin, U.S.
- Died: August 7, 1930 (aged 68); Chicago, Illinois, U.S.
- Burial place: Rosehill Cemetery; 41.987428°N 87.681389°W
- Occupations: Inventor, businessman

Signature
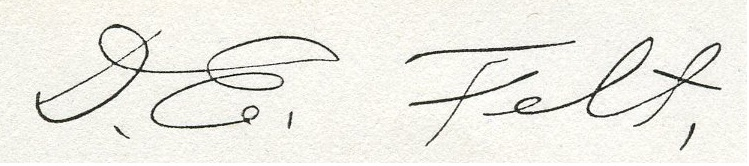

Dorr Eugene Felt (March 18, 1862 – August 7, 1930) was an American inventor and industrialist who was known for having invented the Comptometer, an early computing device, and the Comptograph, the first printing adding machine. The Felt & Tarrant Manufacturing Company that he co-founded with Robert Tarrant on January 25, 1889 remained a major player in the calculator industry until the mid-1970s.

== Biography ==
Dorr E. Felt was born in Beloit, Wisconsin where he grew up on the family farm and which he left at age 14 to seek employment. His father, Eugene K. Felt, was a member of the Wisconsin State Assembly. At 16, "his bent of mind, leaning towards mechanics, led him to seek work in a machine shop in Beloit where he found his first employment in the spring of 1878." At 18, he started to learn French and eventually spoke it fluently. In early 1882, at age 20, he came to Chicago and worked as foreman of a rolling mill that had a daily output valued at $2,000. In that time he began his work on the Comptometer.

During the US Thanksgiving holidays of 1884 he decided to build the prototype of a new calculating machine that he had invented. Because of his limited amount of money, he used a macaroni box for the outside box, and skewers, staples and rubber bands for the mechanism inside. It was finished soon after New Year's Day, 1885.

Felt brought his idea to Chicago businessman Robert Tarrant. They signed a partnership contract on November 28, 1887, and incorporated the Felt & Tarrant Manufacturing Company on January 25, 1889. Felt later went on to invent more devices and acquired 46 domestic patents and 25 foreign ones. The original macaroni box prototype and the first Comptograph ever sold are now part of the Smithsonian Museum collection of antique calculators.

He was married to Agnes McNulty in 1891 and the couple had four daughters together.

Felt was awarded the John Scott Medal of The Franklin Institute in 1889. Dorr Felt also was the first ambassador for the Department of Commerce formed to study labor abroad after World War I. He was an excellent photographer, and many of his war-time and post-war time photos were used by the government. Dorr traveled the world and loved learning. He made his home in Chicago and summered in Laketown Township, Michigan, where the Dorr E. Felt Mansion is registered on the list of National Historic Places.

=== The Summer Mansion ===
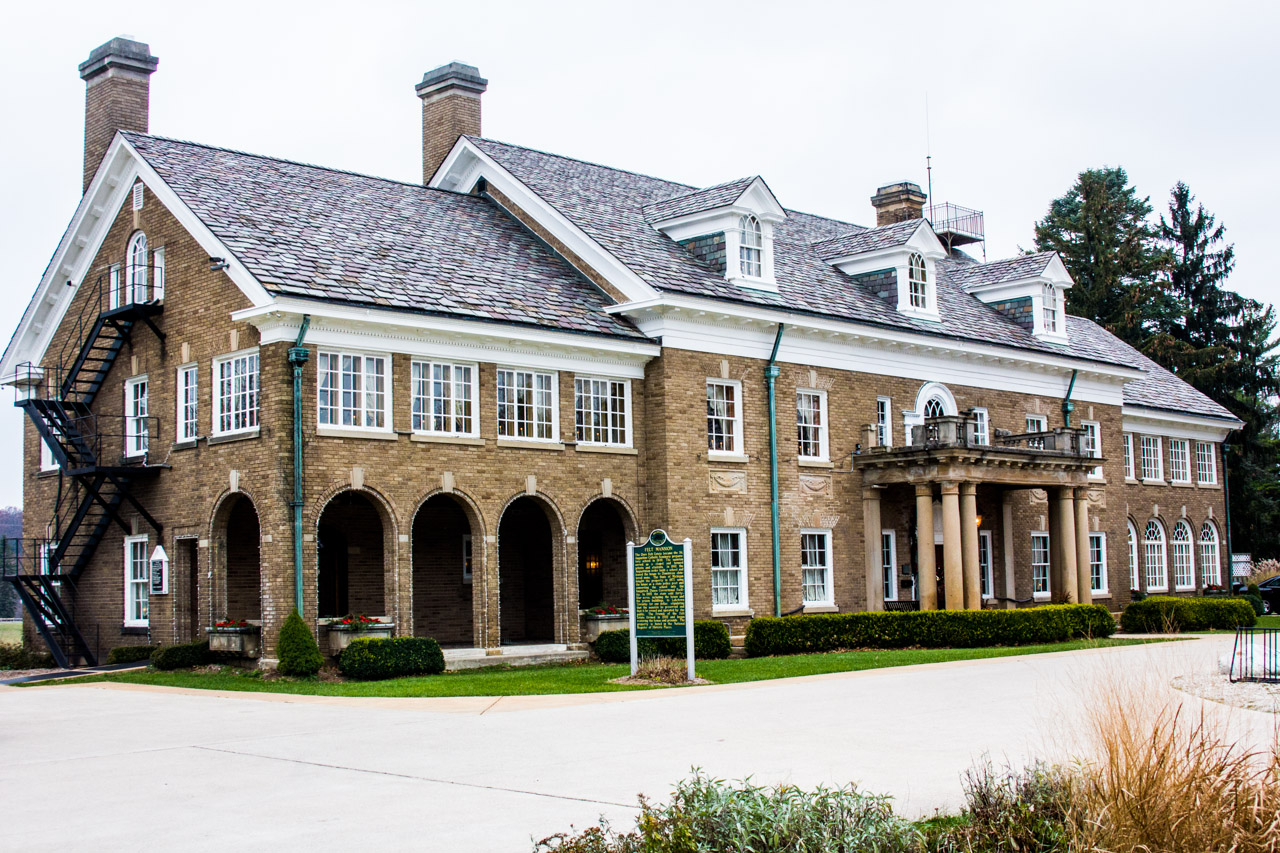
Felt Summer Mansion

Dorr was attracted to the pristine beauty of the West Michigan coastline, then known as "the Midwest Riviera". In 1919, he purchased several hundred acres on Lake Michigan in the rolling dunes between Holland and Saugatuck, naming his estate "Shore Acres Farm."

In 1925, Felt began construction of the "Big House" for his wife, Agnes. This summer home would be large enough to accommodate his four married daughters and their families. Completed in 1928, the 12,000+ square foot mansion consists of 25 rooms, including a third-floor ballroom. Agnes died in August 1928, six weeks after the family had moved in. Dorr died a year and a half later in 1930. In 1949, after WWII and the advent of more sophisticated calculators, the family sold the firm to Victor Calculator, and the Felt descendants decided to sell Shore Acres Farm. In 1949, they held a large auction, selling off many of the items original to the mansion and grounds.

After the Felt family left in 1949, the Saint Augustine Seminary, a Roman Catholic prep school for young men, bought the house and grounds. The carriage house was used for classrooms; the mansion was used for accommodation. The Seminary built a school on the ridge, west of the house. A group of nuns lived in the mansion. As part of the class of 1973, then Robert Prevost, now Pope Leo XIV, attended the Saint Augustine Seminary.

In the late 1970s, the State of Michigan purchased the property to use as a prison. Part of the mansion was used during these years by the Michigan State Police. The State owned the grounds. In the early 1990s, Laketown Township purchased the land for one dollar, with the stipulation that the mansion be used for the public, not sold or used for private enterprise.

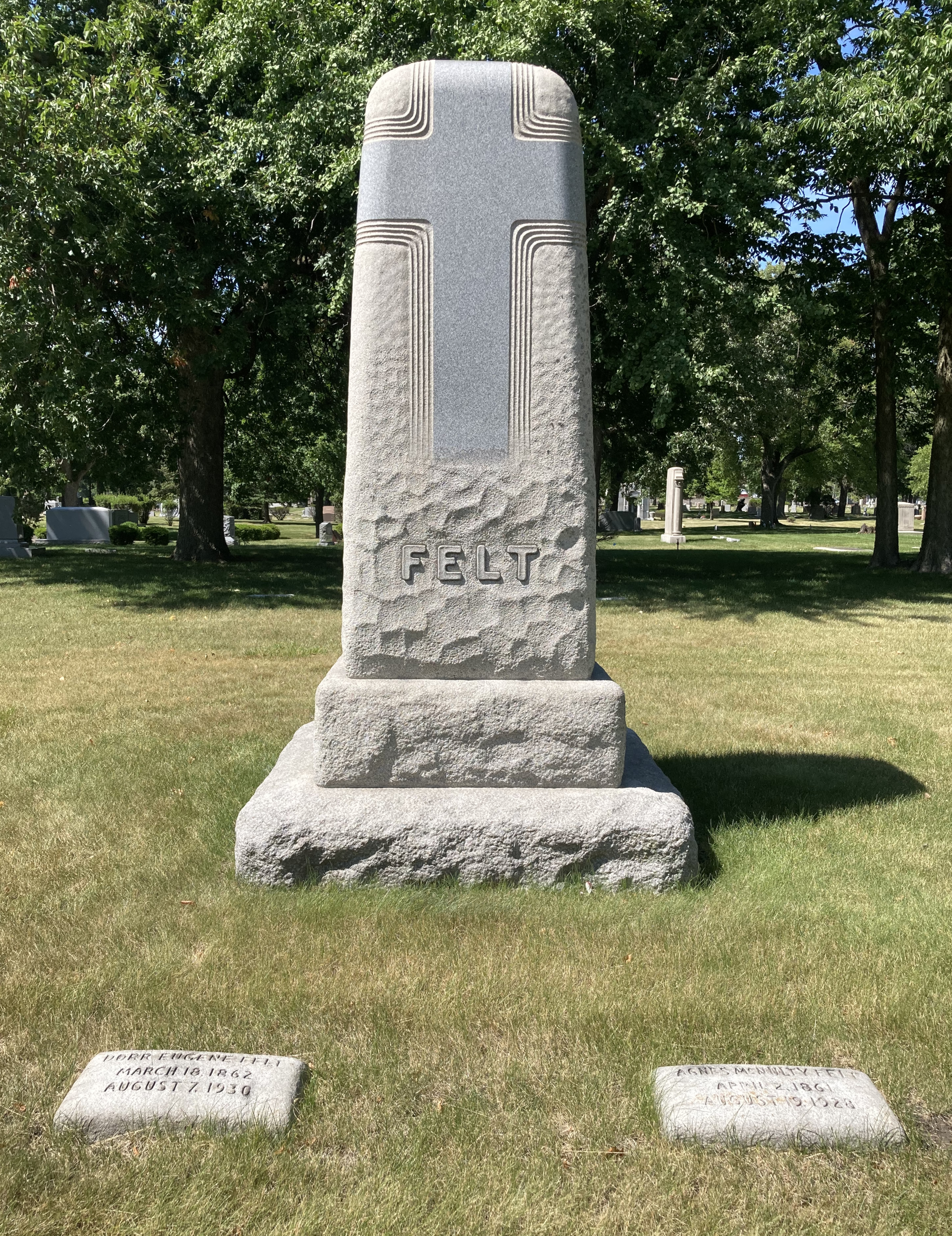
Felt's grave at Rosehill Cemetery

=== Death ===
Dorr E. Felt died of a stroke in Chicago on August 7, 1930. He was 68 years old. He was buried at Rosehill Cemetery.

== Bibliography ==
=== Biographies ===
- W.W. Johnson, "Scars on My Hands: The Life of Dorr Eugene Felt, Inventor and Industrialist," (unpublished), Schmidt Collection, Mathematics, NMAH.
- Comptometer website
- World of Computer Science
- 1918 Biographical Sketch
- Wisconsin Biographies
