= National Register of Historic Places listings in Allegan County, Michigan =

The following is a list of Registered Historic Places in Allegan County, Michigan.
This National Park Service list is complete through NPS recent listings posted September 26, 2025.

	Name on the Register	Image	Date listed	Location	City or town	Description
1	All Saints' Episcopal Church†	All Saints' Episcopal Church†	December 27, 1984 (#84000511)	252 Grand St. 42°39′23″N 86°12′03″W	Saugatuck	
2	Edward D. Born House	Edward D. Born House	March 12, 1987 (#87000237)	158 Hill St. 42°32′03″N 85°50′40″W	Allegan	
3	Engelbert B. Born House	Engelbert B. Born House	March 12, 1987 (#87000238)	128 Hill St. 42°31′59″N 85°50′41″W	Allegan	
4	William H. Brown House	William H. Brown House	July 8, 1987 (#87000239)	800 Ely St. 42°31′09″N 85°51′55″W	Allegan	
5	Cherry DeLefebvre House	Cherry DeLefebvre House	November 1, 1991 (#91001548)	115 W. Chart St. 42°26′30″N 85°38′32″W	Plainwell	
6	Douglas Union School†	Douglas Union School†	July 21, 1995 (#95000870)	130 Center St. 42°38′39″N 86°12′13″W	Douglas	
7	Downtown Allegan Historic District	Downtown Allegan Historic District	March 12, 1987 (#87000251)	Roughly bounded by Trowbridge, Locust, Hubbard, Brady, and Water Sts. 42°31′39″N 85°50′58″W	Allegan	
8	J. F. Eesley Milling Co. Flour Mill–Elevator	J. F. Eesley Milling Co. Flour Mill–Elevator	November 1, 1991 (#91001547)	717 E. Bridge St. 42°26′35″N 85°37′54″W	Plainwell	
9	Dorr E. Felt Mansion†	Dorr E. Felt Mansion†	December 12, 1996 (#96001418)	6597 138th Ave. 42°41′49″N 86°11′37″W	Holland	
10	Fifty-Seventh Street Bridge†	Fifty-Seventh Street Bridge†	April 1, 1998 (#98000273)	57th St. over the Kalamazoo River; 42°39′05″N 86°06′25″W	Manlius Township	
11	Francis Metallic Surfboat†	Francis Metallic Surfboat†	April 21, 2015 (#15000156)	130 W. Center St. 42°38′39″N 86°12′12″W	Douglas	
12	Henry Franks House	Henry Franks House	March 12, 1987 (#87000252)	535 Ely St. 42°31′26″N 85°51′33″W	Allegan	
13	Griswold Civic Center Historic District	Griswold Civic Center Historic District	March 12, 1987 (#87000253)	Roughly bounded by Hubbard, Walnut, and Trowbridge Sts. 42°31′38″N 85°51′10″W	Allegan	
14	Hacklander Site†	Hacklander Site†	July 27, 1973 (#73002150)	South shore of Kalamazoo River, at Hacklander River Access. 42°38′10″N 86°09′45″W	Douglas	Archaeological site also designated "20AE78".
15	HENNEPIN Self-unloading Steamship (Shipwreck)	HENNEPIN Self-unloading Steamship (Shipwreck)	February 1, 2008 (#07001489)	Lake Michigan; 42°27′39″N 86°31′47″W	South Haven	
16	Island Historic District	Island Historic District	November 1, 1991 (#91001546)	Roughly bounded by Hill St., Anderson St., the mill race, Park St., Bannister St. and the Kalamazoo River; 42°26′26″N 85°38′24″W	Plainwell	
17	Lake Shore Chapel	Lake Shore Chapel	March 28, 1997 (#97000280)	Shorewood Rd., junction with Campbell Rd. 42°39′02″N 86°13′18″W	Douglas	
18	Leiendecker's Inn-Coral Gables	Leiendecker's Inn-Coral Gables	July 16, 2009 (#09000520)	220 Water St. 42°39′21″N 86°12′19″W	Saugatuck	
19	Augustus Lilly House	Augustus Lilly House	March 12, 1987 (#87000254)	132 Cora St. 42°32′17″N 85°50′41″W	Allegan	
20	Marshall Street Historic District	Marshall Street Historic District	March 12, 1987 (#87000256)	231-237, 335-705, 232-630 Marshall St. 42°31′16″N 85°50′34″W	Allegan	
21	William C. Messenger House	William C. Messenger House	March 12, 1987 (#87000258)	310 River St. 42°32′03″N 85°50′54″W	Allegan	
22	Michigan Paper Company Mill Historic District†	Michigan Paper Company Mill Historic District†	September 8, 2011 (#11000636)	200 Allegan St. 42°26′40″N 85°38′40″W	Plainwell	
23	Navigation Structures at Saugatuck Harbor	Navigation Structures at Saugatuck Harbor	November 8, 2001 (#01001216)	Mouth of the Kalamazoo River; 42°40′35″N 86°12′58″W	Saugatuck Township	
24	Oakwood Cemetery Chapel	Oakwood Cemetery Chapel	March 12, 1987 (#87000261)	Arbor St. 42°31′38″N 85°51′44″W	Allegan	
25	Old Wing Mission†	Old Wing Mission†	August 13, 1986 (#86001551)	5298 E. 40th Ave. 42°45′42″N 86°04′02″W	Holland	
26	Pritchard's Outlook Historic District	Pritchard's Outlook Historic District	July 8, 1987 (#87000265)	Roughly bounded by Park Dr., Walnut, Crescent, and Davis Sts. 42°31′46″N 85°51′20″W	Allegan	
27	Saugatuck Gap Filler Annex	Saugatuck Gap Filler Annex	December 28, 2022 (#100008508)	753 Park St. 42°39′41″N 86°12′33″W	Saugatuck	
28	Saugatuck Pump House	Saugatuck Pump House	December 29, 2015 (#15000943)	735 Park St. 42°39′38″N 86°12′26″W	Saugatuck	Now the Saugatuck Douglas Historical Museum
29	Second Street Bridge†	Second Street Bridge†	June 11, 1980 (#80001845)	2nd St. 42°31′52″N 85°50′53″W	Allegan	
30	Second Street–Gun River Bridge		December 17, 1999 (#99001573)	2nd St. over Gun River (Martin Township); 42°30′56″N 85°33′46″W	Hooper	Bridge Demolished- Replaced with a modern span
31	James Noble Sherwood House	James Noble Sherwood House	December 27, 1984 (#84000507)	768 Riverview Dr. 42°25′55″N 85°37′09″W	Plainwell	
32	Sarah Lowe Stedman House	Sarah Lowe Stedman House	March 12, 1987 (#87000266)	632 Grand St. 42°31′59″N 85°50′05″W	Allegan	
33	Warner P. Sutton House†	Warner P. Sutton House†	January 22, 1992 (#91001999)	736 Pleasant St. 42°39′13″N 86°11′47″W	Saugatuck	
34	Wayland Downtown Historic District	Wayland Downtown Historic District	September 14, 2021 (#100006916)	Generally Main St. Between Maple and Pine Sts., and Superior St. Between Church and Forest Sts. 42°40′26″N 85°38′36″W	Wayland	
35	West Bridge Street Historic District	West Bridge Street Historic District	November 1, 1991 (#91001549)	320, 414-550 and 321-563 W. Bridge St. 42°26′32″N 85°38′57″W	Plainwell	

== See also ==
- List of Registered Historic Places in Michigan
- List of Michigan State Historic Sites in Allegan County, Michigan
- National Register of Historic Places listings in Michigan
- Listings in neighboring counties: Barry, Kalamazoo, Kent, Ottawa, Van Buren
