= Marshall Street Historic District =

Marshall Street Historic District may refer to:

- Marshall Street Historic District (Allegan, Michigan), listed on the National Register of Historic Places in Allegan County, Michigan
- Marshall Street Historic District (Coldwater, Michigan), listed on the National Register of Historic Places in Branch County, Michigan
