= Edward D. Born House =

Historic house in Michigan, United States

- U.S. National Register of Historic Places
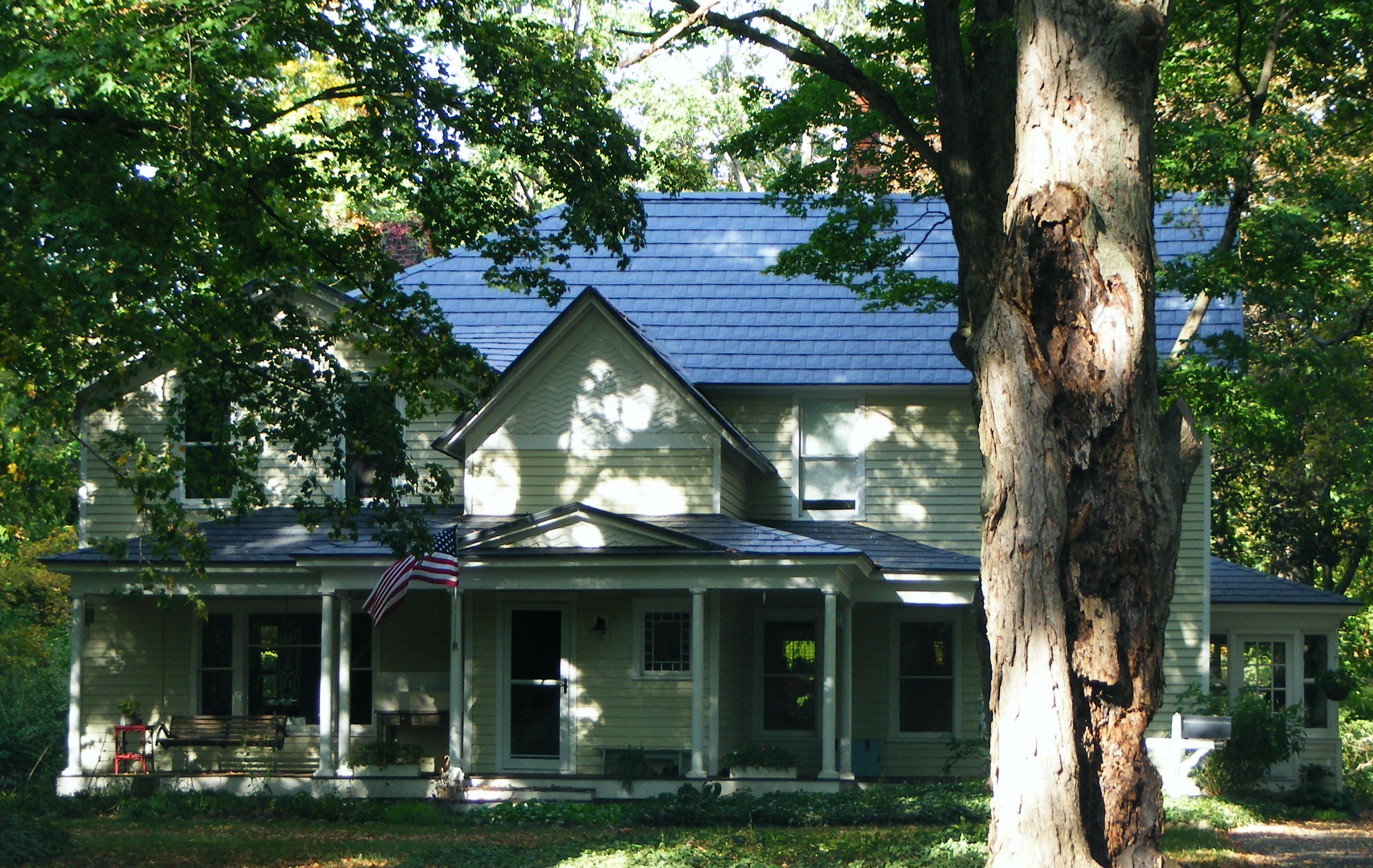

- Location within Michigan Location within the United States
- Interactive map
- Location: 158 Hill Street, Allegan, Michigan
- Coordinates: 42°32′3″N 85°50′40″W
- Area: 1 acre (0.40 ha)
- Built: 1890
- MPS: Allegan MRA
- NRHP reference No.: 87000237
- Added to NRHP: March 12, 1987

The Edward D. Born House is a private house located at 158 Hill Street in Allegan, Michigan. It was added to the National Register of Historic Places in 1987.

== History ==
Edward D. Born was the third son of Englebert B. Born, the founder of the Allegan Wagon and Carriage Factory. Edward Born constructed this house for his family in about 1890.

== Description ==
The house is a simple two-story, L-shaped house covered with clapboard siding. It has a cross-gabled roof with one hipped portion. The front has a projecting two-story entryway with a Tuscan-columned porch.

== See also ==
- Engelbert B. Born House
- William H. Brown House
- National Register of Historic Places listings in Allegan County, Michigan
