= Engelbert B. Born House =

- U.S. National Register of Historic Places
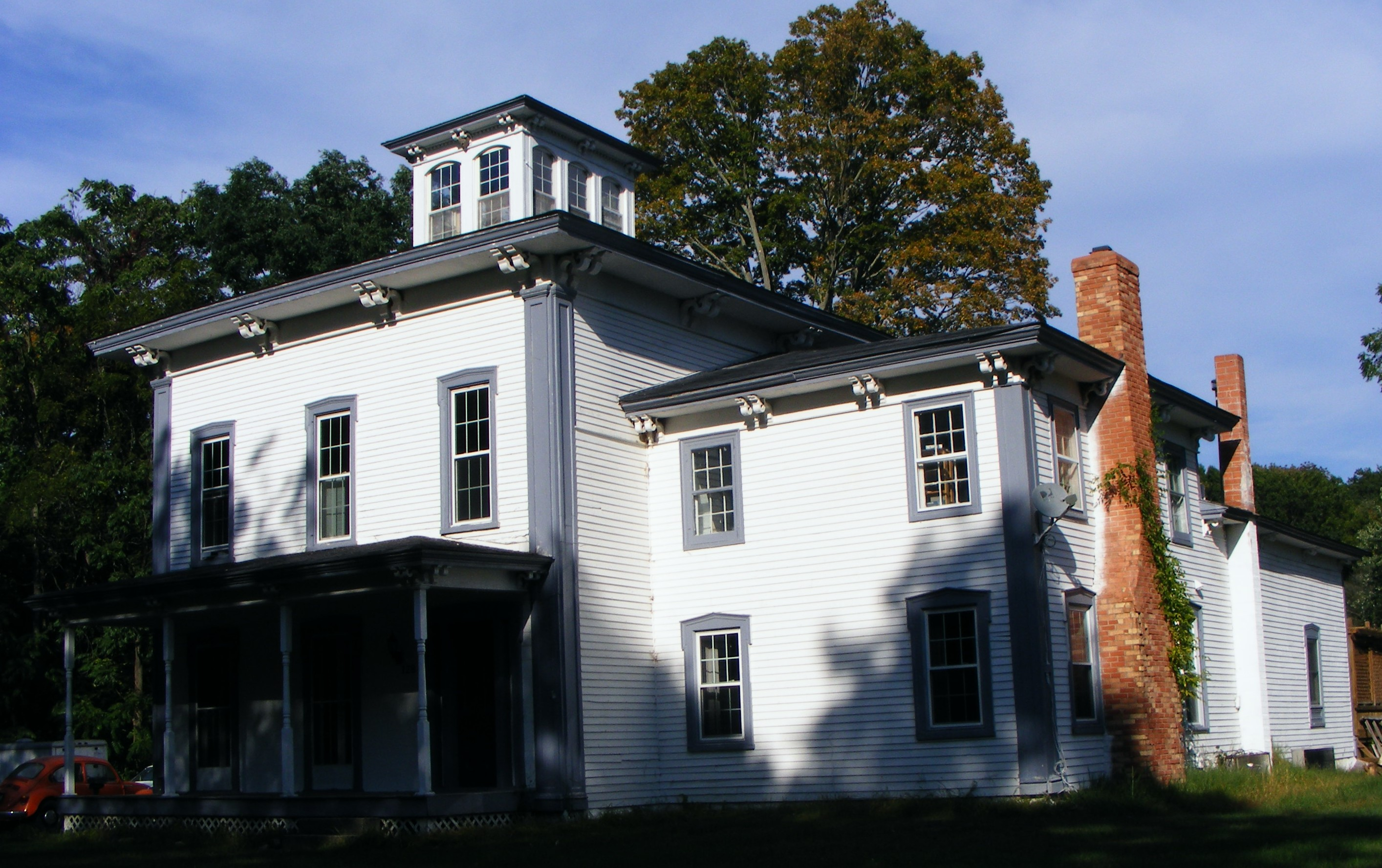

- Location within Michigan Location within the United States
- Interactive map
- Location: 128 Hill St., Allegan, Michigan
- Coordinates: 42°31′59″N 85°50′41″W
- Area: 1 acre (0.40 ha)
- Built: 1863
- Architectural style: Italianate
- MPS: Allegan MRA
- NRHP reference No.: 87000238
- Added to NRHP: March 12, 1987

The Engelbert B. Born House is a private house located at 128 Hill Street in Allegan, Michigan. It was added to the National Register of Historic Places in 1987.

== History ==
Englebert B. Born arrived in the United States from Nassau, Germany in 1852. In 1854, he founded the Allegan Wagon and Carriage Factory. The factory prospered, and Born constructed this house in 1863.

== Description ==
The Engelbert B. Born House is a two-story, L-shaped, frame Italianate structure on a masonry foundation. It is sided with clapboard and has paneled pilasters on the corners. The low-pitched hipped roof widely overhangs the walls, and has a cupola at the top.

== See also ==
- Edward D. Born House
- William H. Brown House
- National Register of Historic Places listings in Allegan County, Michigan
