= All Saints Episcopal Church (Saugatuck, Michigan) =

Historic church in Michigan, United States

- All Saints' Episcopal Church
- U.S. National Register of Historic Places
- Michigan State Historic Site
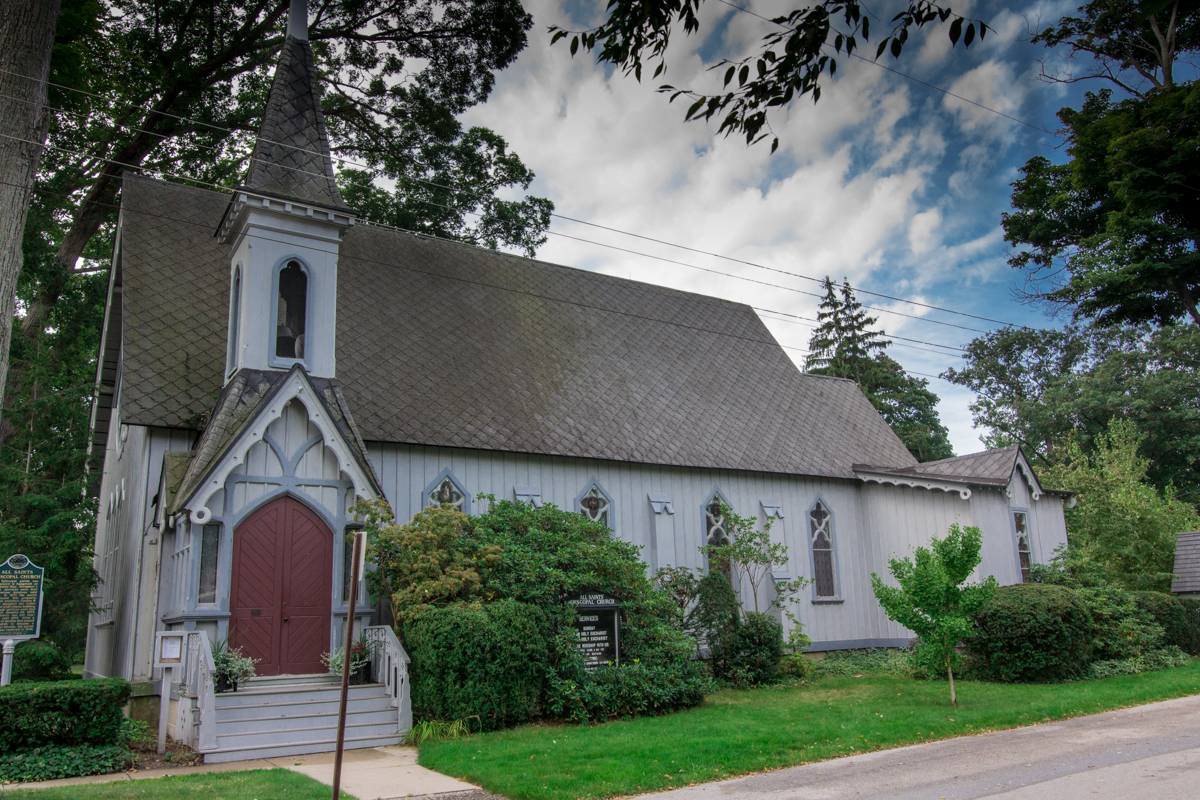

- Location within Michigan Location within the United States
- Interactive map
- Location: 252 Grand St., Saugatuck, Michigan
- Coordinates: 42°39′23″N 86°12′3″W
- Area: less than one acre
- Built: 1873
- Built by: George Harnes, George E. Dunn, and William Dunning
- Architect: Gordon W. Lloyd
- Architectural style: Gothic Revival
- NRHP reference No.: 84000511

Significant dates
- Added to NRHP: December 27, 1984
- Designated MSHS: April 24, 1981

All Saints Episcopal Church, built in 1872–1873, is an historic Carpenter Gothic church in Saugatuck, Michigan. On February 27, 1984, it was added to the National Register of Historic Places. The church was part of the Episcopal Diocese of Western Michigan, now the Episcopal Diocese of the Great Lakes.

In 2017, the church reported 286 members; in 2023, it reported 135 members. No membership statistics were reported in 2024 national parochial reports. Plate and pledge financial support reported by the church in 2024 was $213,970. Average Sunday Attendance (ASA) reported in 2024 was 56 persons. This was a relative decrease from ASA of 114 persons reported in 2016.

== History ==
The first Episcopal service in the vicinity of Saugatuck was conducted by the Reverend J. Rice Taylor in 1862. The Saugatuck Episcopal congregation was officially organized in 1868. Taylor, who had been assigned to the parish in Holland, Michigan, acted as a missionary minister. The congregation immediately began planning for a church building, and in 1871, purchased the lot that this church sits on. Taylor was instrumental in raising funds for the church, both within and outside of the parish.

The congregation hired Detroit architect Gordon W. Lloyd to design the new church, and local workmen George Harnes, George E. Dunn, and William Dunning to construct it. Construction began in 1872, and although the church was not yet complete, the first service was held in January 1873. The church was substantially completed by the end of 1874. However, the building was poorly outfitted, and over the next few years, funds were raised to install stained glass windows, carpets, a reed organ, lamps, and seats.

Saugatuck's fortunes declined over the next few decades, as lumbering slowed and the population fell. By 1892, the church entered a period of disuse, lacking a priest and it was vandalized. However, by 1907, Saugatuck had become a popular summering spot, and the church became renewed, regaining a priest. Regular services were once again held in the church, and its infrastructure upgraded The church continues to be used by the Episcopal congregation.

== Description ==
All Saints Episcopal Church is a board-and-batten Gothic Revival structure with a gable roof and tower located on one corner containing the main entrance. The facades have lancet windows.

The interior has pine flooring and a vertical-board, beaded wainscoting. The ceiling is constructed against the underside of the roof, and supported by exposed wooden trusses. The nave has a center aisle with pews on each side.

== See also ==
List of Registered Historic Places in Allegan County, Michigan
