= William H. Brown House =

- U.S. National Register of Historic Places
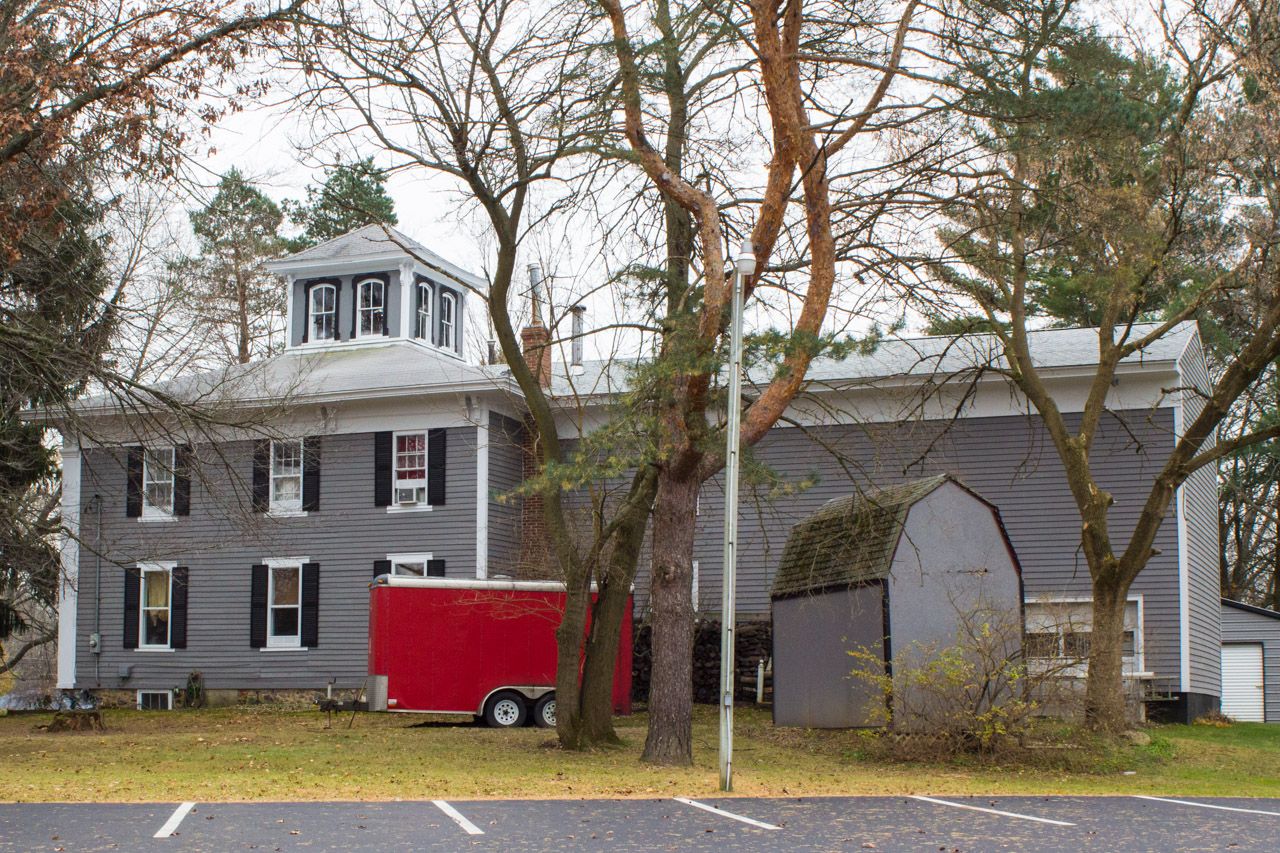

- Location within Michigan Location within the United States
- Interactive map
- Location: 800 Ely St., Allegan, Michigan
- Coordinates: 42°31′9″N 85°51′55″W
- Area: less than one acre
- Built: 1854
- Architectural style: Italianate
- MPS: Allegan MRA
- NRHP reference No.: 87000239
- Added to NRHP: July 8, 1987

The William H. Brown House is a private house located at 800 Ely Street in Allegan, Michigan. It was added to the National Register of Historic Places in 1987.

== History ==
William H. Brown was a Methodist preacher and an early member of Allegan's First Methodist Episcopal Church. He first arrived in the Allegan area in 1836, and built this house in 1854.

== Description ==
The William H. Brown House is a two-story frame Italianate structure with clapboard siding with a low-pitched hipped roof. The eaves widely overhang the walls, and the corners of the house have pilasters. A porch has been added to the side of the house.

== See also ==
- Edward D. Born House
- Engelbert B. Born House
- National Register of Historic Places listings in Allegan County, Michigan
