= William C. Messenger House =

- U.S. National Register of Historic Places
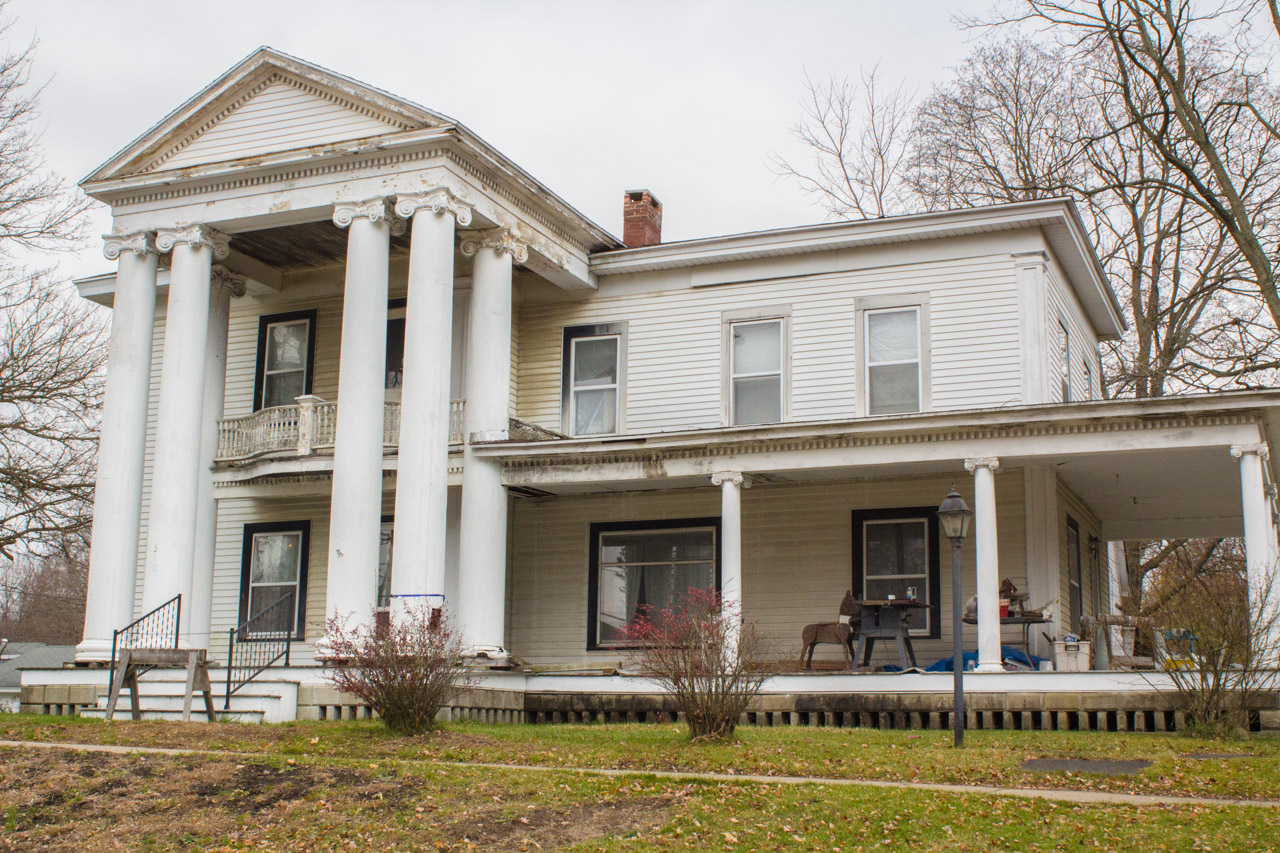

- Location within Michigan Location within the United States
- Interactive map
- Location: 310 River St., Allegan, Michigan
- Coordinates: 42°32′3″N 85°50′54″W
- Area: less than one acre
- Built: 1858
- Architectural style: Classical Revival, Greek Revival
- MPS: Allegan MRA
- NRHP reference No.: 87000258
- Added to NRHP: March 12, 1987

The William C. Messenger House is a private house located at 310 River Street in Allegan, Michigan. It was added to the National Register of Historic Places in 1987.

== History ==
William Messenger came to Allegan in 1858 from New York state. He established a factory here to make fanning mills, and constructed this house at the same time. The house was extensively renovated in 1900, with the addition of Classical Revival porches on the base Greek Revival structure.

== Description ==
The William C. Messenger House is a two-story fame structure clad with clapboard. It has a low-pitched hipped roof, and two, two-story Classical Revival gabled entry porch supported by Ionic columns.
