= Wayland Downtown Historic District =

Historic district in Michigan, United States

- U.S. National Register of Historic Places
- U.S. Historic district
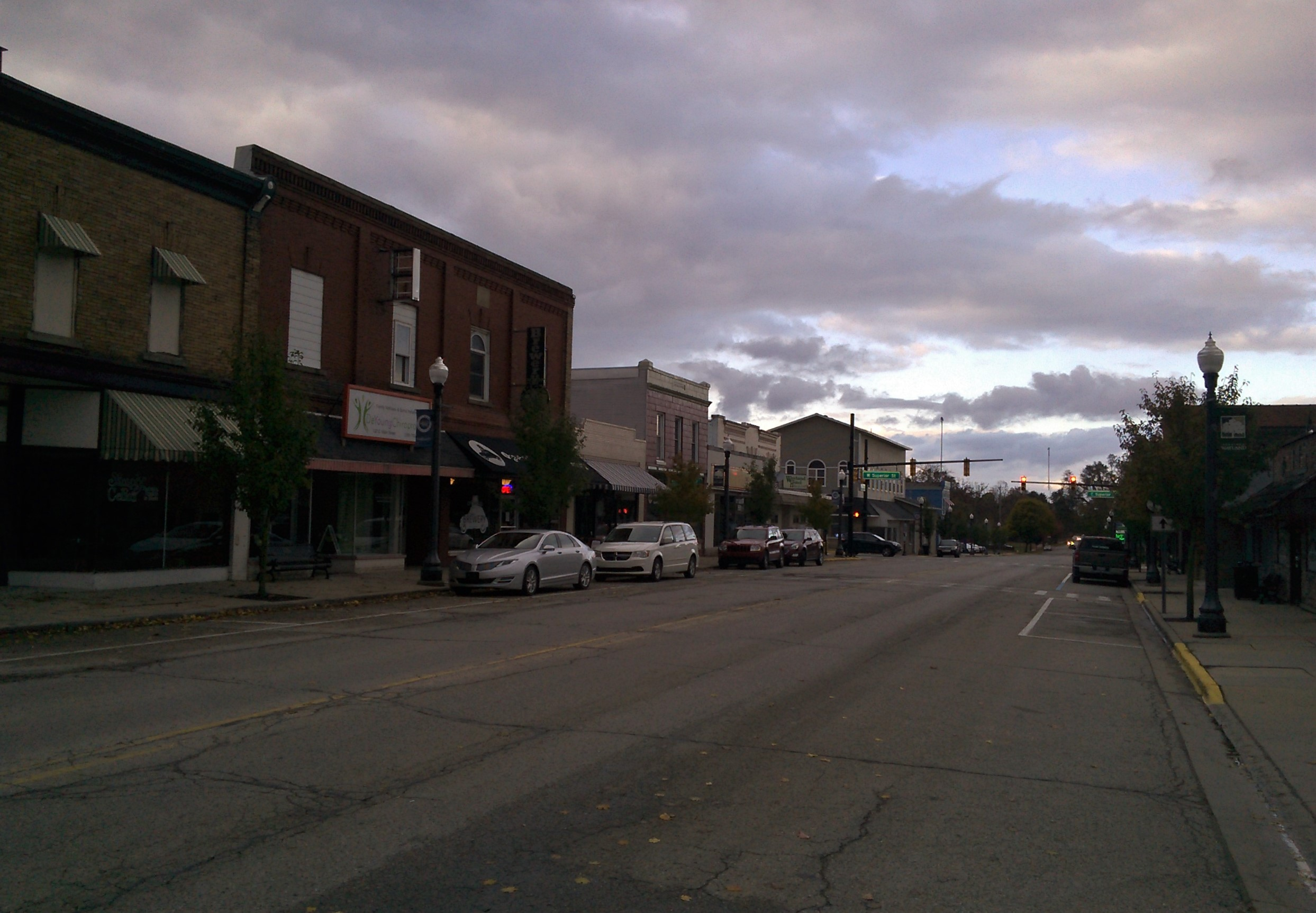

- Location within Michigan Location within the United States
- Interactive map
- Location: Generally Main St. Between Maple and Pine Sts., and Superior St. Between Church and Forest Sts, Wayland, Michigan
- Coordinates: 42°40′26″N 85°38′36″W
- Area: 5 acres (2.0 ha)
- Architect: Fred H. Eely
- Architectural style: Richardsonian Romanesque, Late 19th Century and Early 20th Century American Movements, Commercial Style
- NRHP reference No.: 100006916
- Added to NRHP: September 14, 2021

The Wayland Downtown Historic District is primarily commercial historic district located on Main and Superior Streets, between Maple and Pine Streets and between Church and Forest Streets in Wayland, Michigan. It was added to the National Register of Historic Places in 2011.

== History ==
Wayland was founded in 1837, but did not grow significantly until a plank road was constructed through what is now the historic district in 1852. Commercial activity in the center of town dates from 1854. The village was platted in 1861, and additional plats were recorded over the next decade as more inhabitants moved in. When the Grand Rapids and Indiana Railroad arrived in 1870, Wayland began growing much faster, capitalizing on its location between Grand Rapids and Kalamazoo. A number of commercial structures were built in the downtown area over the next few decades, but a series of fires starting in 1881 and continuing through the first part of the 20th century destroyed many of the older buildings.

As the 20th century progressed, more automobile traffic between Kalamazoo and Grand Rapids came through Wayland. However, in the late 1950s, a freeway bypassing the downtown was constructed, and the downtown began to stagnate. By 1990, population again started to increase as people moved from larger cities out to smaller settlements. A series of small businesses continued to occupy the downtown buildings, and by the 21st century, a Main Street program was firmly in place to preserve the small-town environment of the district.

== Description ==
The Wayland Downtown Historic District spans a little less than four square blocks centered on the intersection of Main and Superior Streets, encompassing Wayland’s historic central business district. It contains 35 buildings, 29 of which contribute to the historic character of the district. The district consists mostly of one- and two-story commercial blocks abutting the sidewalk line, and also including the Richardsonian Romanesque Henika Library. The buildings are typically brick, but there is a variety of styles, materials, and architectural details.

The earliest building in the district were constructed in the 1880s. Many of these, located along West Superior, date from soon after the fire of 1883. Most of the remaining contributing buildings date from around the turn of the 20th century, with a handful constructed in the 1930s-1950s.
