= Oakwood Cemetery Chapel (Allegan, Michigan) =

Historic site in Allegan County, Michigan, US

- U.S. National Register of Historic Places
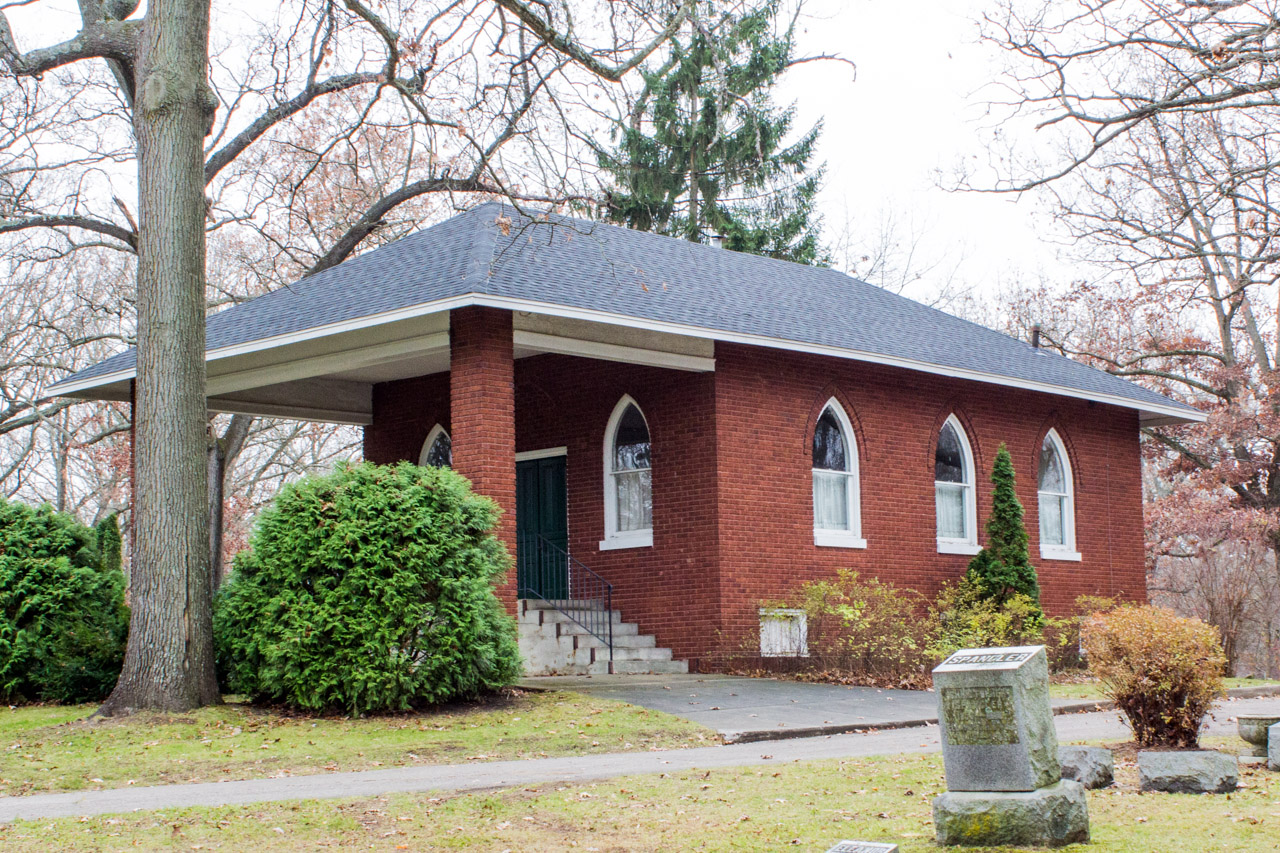

- Location within Michigan Location within the United States
- Interactive map
- Location: Arbor St., Allegan, Michigan
- Coordinates: 42°31′38″N 85°51′44″W
- Area: less than one acre
- Built: 1920
- Built by: E. Haines
- Architectural style: Bungalow/craftsman
- MPS: Allegan MRA
- NRHP reference No.: 87000261
- Added to NRHP: March 12, 1987

Oakwood Cemetery Chapel is a historic chapel on Arbor Street in Allegan, Michigan. It was built in 1920 and added to the National Register in 1987.

== History ==
Alexander L. Ely, one of Allegan's early proprietors, gave the land for Oakwood Cemetery to the city early in the city's history. The original tract was added onto in 1873. In 1920, the cemetery hired E. Haines to construct this building.

== Description ==
The Oakwood Chapel is a brown brick building with a hipped roof that extends outward from the building to form a porte cochere. The building has Gothic windows with raised brick, and contains an office, a crypt, and the main chapel.

== Cemetery ==
Oakwood Cemetery itself is the burial place of US Congressmen Clare Eugene Hoffman (1875–1967) and William Brewster Williams (1826–1905) and Civil War general Benjamin Dudley Pritchard (1835–1907).
