= Island Historic District =

Historic district in Michigan, United States

- U.S. National Register of Historic Places
- U.S. Historic district
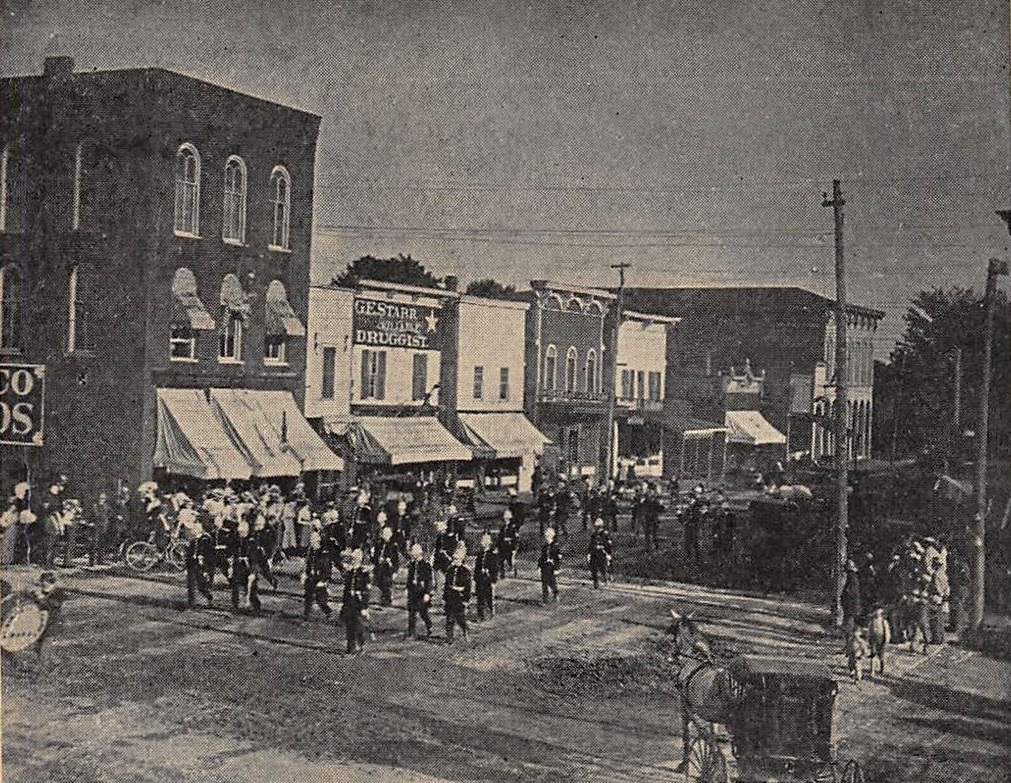
- Main Street looking south from Bridge, circa 1907

- Location within Michigan Location within the United States
- Interactive map
- Location: Roughly bounded by Hill St., Anderson St., the mill race, Park St., Bannister St. and the Kalamazoo R., Plainwell, Michigan
- Coordinates: 42°26′26″N 85°38′24″W
- Area: 60 acres (24 ha)
- Architectural style: Stick/Eastlake, Italianate, Queen Anne
- MPS: Plainwell MPS
- NRHP reference No.: 91001546
- Added to NRHP: November 1, 1991

The Island Historic District is a mixed commercial and residential historic district located in Plainwell, Michigan. It is roughly bounded by Bannister Street to the north, Hill Street to the south, the Kalamazoo River to the east, and Park Street to the west, as well as including properties along Main Street south of the mill race and along Bridge Street west to the mill race. The district was listed on the National Register of Historic Places in 1991.

== History ==
Plainwell was first settled in the 1830s, and the first frame house built in what is now the Island Historic District was constructed in 1846. In the early 1850s, two plank toll roads were built through the area along what are now Main and Allegan Streets, leading to an increase in development around "The Junction" between the two. In 1856, the Plainwell Water Power Company was formed, and the company dug a mill race across a bend in the Kalamazoo River, creating the island which encompasses this district. In 1857, a saw mill was constructed at the outlet of the race, and soon a rake factory, grist mill, and paper mill were all established along the race, using the water power available.

The settlement of Plainwell was platted in 1863 by Ira Chichester, a prominent Allegan businessman, and was incorporated as a village in 1869. By 1873, the central business district of the village had expanded to encompass much of the space it does now, extending along Bridge and Main Streets a block in each direction from The Junction. These buildings were primarily two-story frame structures, but a smattering of brick buildings were already extant in the district; these include the three-story block at the corner of Main and Bridge which dates from at least 1866, and the 1867 Ives Block at 1120 N. Main.

Plainwell grew rapidly in the 1870s and 80s. As the 1890s arrived, many of the older frame commercial buildings gave way to newer brick buildings. Most of the business districts was rebuilt in the 1890s and early 1900s.

== Description ==
The Island Historic District contains the historic central business district of the city, primarily located along Main Street, and the adjacent historic residential areas. The district contains 35 commercial buildings, 137 residences; 139 of the 172 buildings contribute to the historic character of the district. Most of the commercial buildings are one- and two-story brick structures dating from the late 1800s and early 1900s. However, a few earlier commercial buildings of frame construction exist in the district, and two of the buildings are three stories in height.

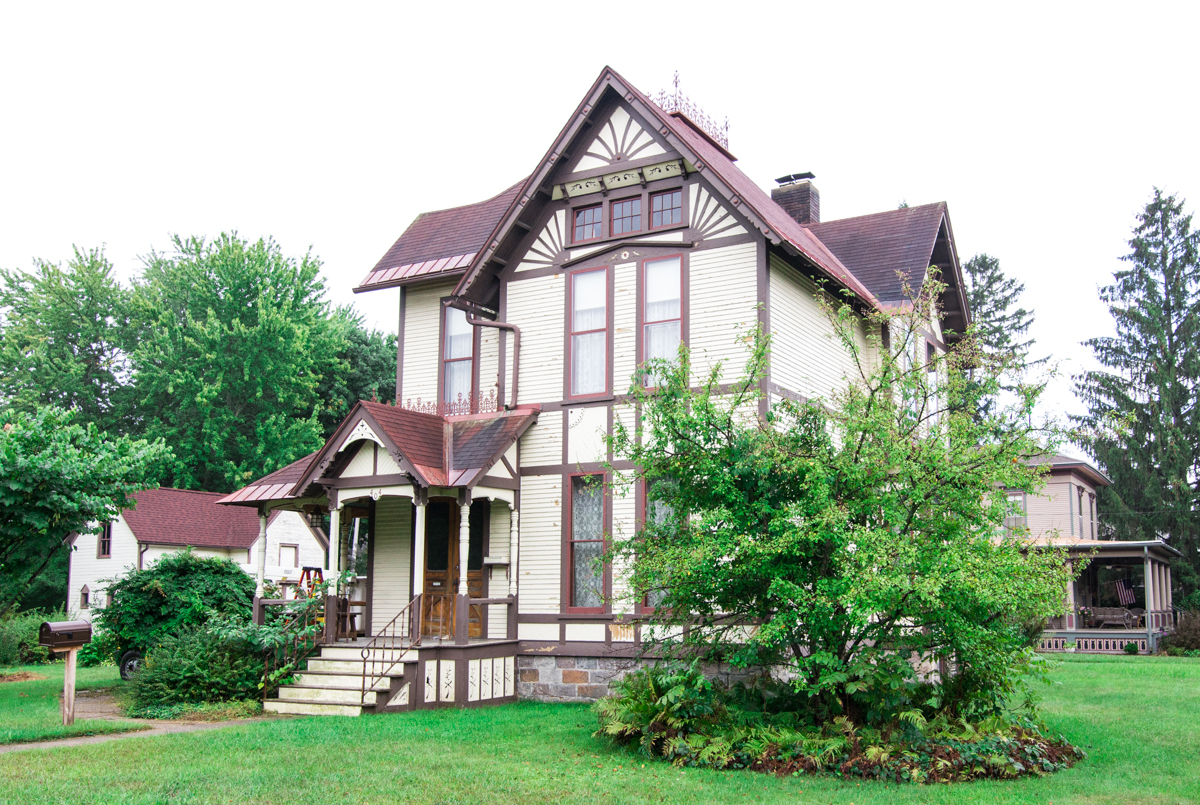
John Crispe House, 404 E. Bridge Street

The grandest residences in the district, and in the village as a whole, are located along East and West Bridge Streets and South Main Street. These include outstanding examples of Eastlake, Italianate, and Queen Anne architecture. The houses in the district east of Main Street and south of Bridge Street are generally more modest, but also display a range of architectural styles.
