= Lake Shore Chapel =

- U.S. National Register of Historic Places
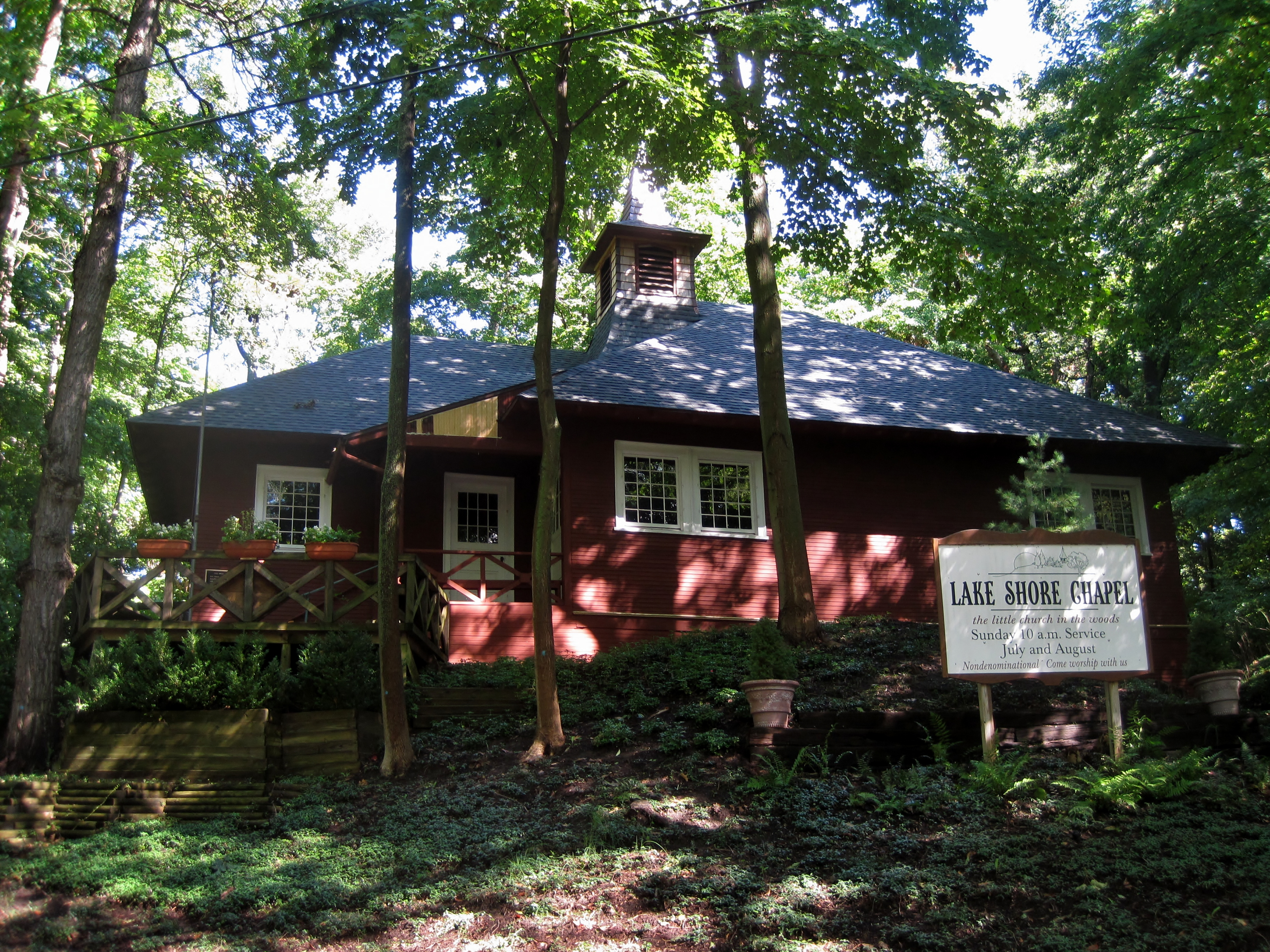

- Location within Michigan Location within the United States
- Interactive map
- Location: Shorewood Rd., jct. with Campbell Rd., Douglas, Michigan
- Coordinates: 42°39′2″N 86°13′18″W
- Area: less than one acre
- Built: 1904
- Built by: J. B. Ackerman
- Architect: Harry L. Walker
- Architectural style: Bungalow/craftsman
- NRHP reference No.: 97000280
- Added to NRHP: March 28, 1997

Lake Shore Chapel is a historic chapel on Shorewood Road at the junction with Campbell Road in Douglas, Michigan. It was built in 1904 and added to the National Register in 1997.

== History ==
In 1896, a summer cottage colony was established near this location by D. O. Barto and William Angus Douglass of Oak Park, Illinois. They purchased lots, built cottages, and were followed by other residents of Oak Park - particularly those from the First Presbyterian Church there - followed suit. In 1897, Professor Lucius E. Sayre of the University of Kansas also established a cottage nearby, and several other university families did the same. In 1899, a small group of people both from both the Oak Park church and the University of Kansas purchased 500 feet of shoreline and christened it "the Knolls." In 101, a larger group purchased and platted one quarter mile of lake frontage just north of the Knolls as "Shorewood." These early cottagers organized their own Sunday school in 1900, and in 1903 decided to construct a chapel.

Property was donated for the chapel, and plans obtained from Atlanta architect Harry L. Walker. The chapel was substantially built over the spring of 1904 by Grand Rapids contractor J. B. Ackerman, and the first Sunday school class met in the building in early July. Final details took a short while longer, and a permanent Lake Shore Chapel organization was founded in August.

A bell tower was constructed in 1925. Although the chapel was originally designed to house both adult worshipers and Sunday school, it was not a satisfactory arrangement due to noise. In 1947/48, the congregation built a separate Sunday school building, designed by Saugatuck architect Carl Hoerman to closely match the original chapel.

== Description ==
The Lake Shore Chapel is a simple one-story hip-roof wood-frame chapel building, measuring approximately 51 feet by 31 feet. The building is L-shaped, with large entrance doors in the angle of the L. The building is clad with clapboards and contains large casement windows. A cupola is located on the asphalt-shingled roof. The interior of the chapel has unfinished walls and a ceiling covered with narrow boarding.

A small freestanding bell tower and a separate Children's Chapel, matching in style and construction, are located nearby.
