= Saugatuck Pump House =

- U.S. National Register of Historic Places
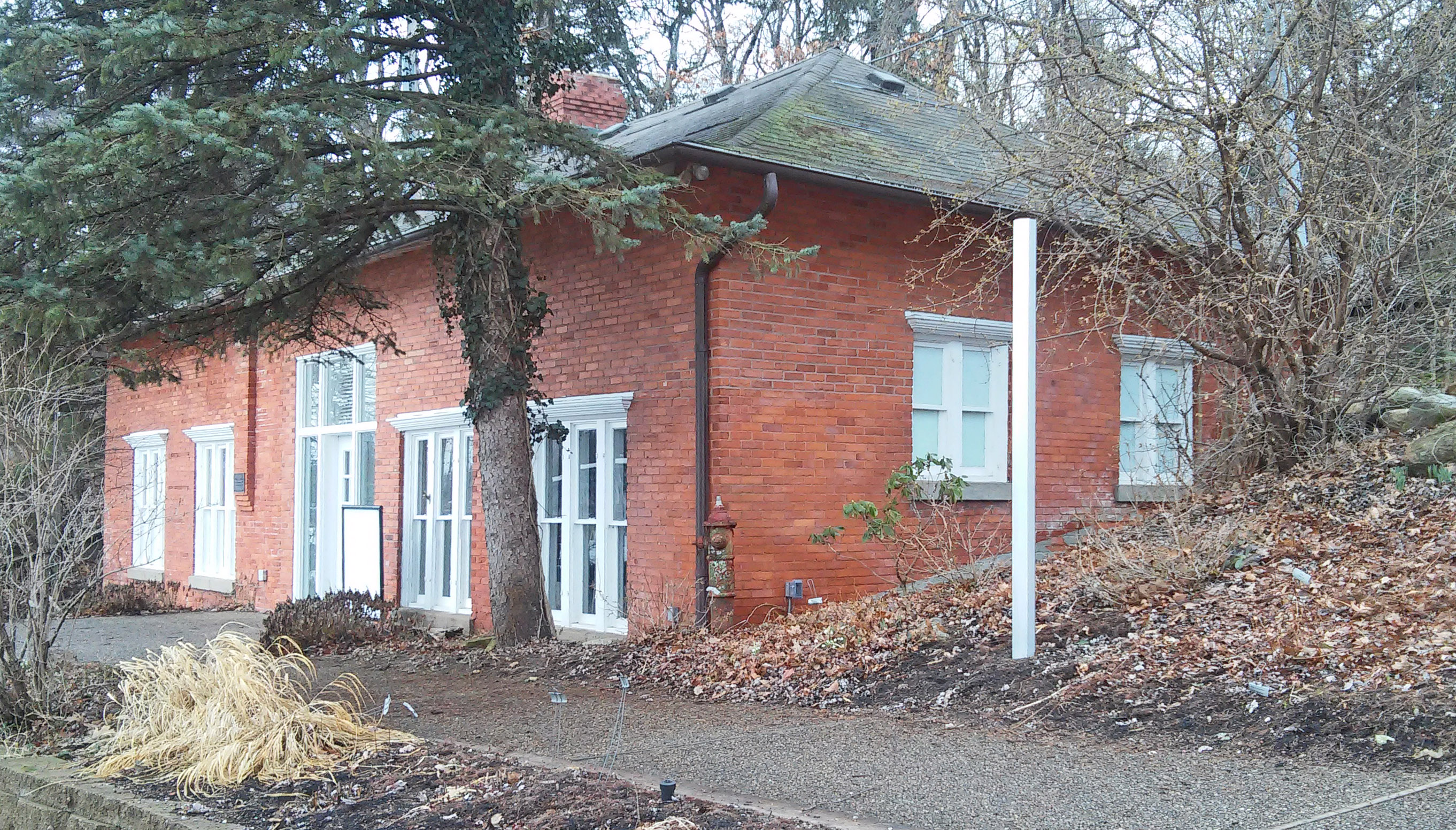
- River side of pump house

- Location within Michigan Location within the United States
- Interactive map
- Location: 735 Park St., Saugatuck, Michigan
- Coordinates: 42°39′38″N 86°12′26″W
- Built: 1904
- Architect: John W. Alvord
- Architectural style: Vernacular brick
- NRHP reference No.: 15000943
- Added to NRHP: December 29, 2015

The Saugatuck Pump House, now the Saugatuck-Douglas History Museum, is a historic building located at 735 Park Street in Saugatuck, Michigan. It was placed on the National Register of Historic Places in 2015.

== History ==
At the beginning of the 1900s, Saugatuck was becoming more popular as a resort town. The municipal water system at the time consisted of a series of cisterns coupled with private wells. Several fires destroyed wooden buildings in town, and the system was proving inadequate. After yet another fire in November 1903, a special election was called to approve the issuance of $8500 in bonds to pay for design and construction of a system of water works. The measure passed, and in early 1904, the village hired John W. Alvord to prepare plans for and superintend the construction of a 100,000-gallon reservoir located at a high point west of the Kalamazoo River, along with pumps to feed the reservoir and a main running back into the town. Work began in May, and what is now the south section of this pump house was completed by mid-August. The entire system was operational by October 1904.

When the system was completed, this pump house contained two 25-horsepower gasoline-powered pumps that drew water from seven wells and pumped it to a nearby reservoir. In 1912, the pump house was enlarged with another section to house an electric power generating station. The pump house continued to be used for both water and electric generation until approximately 1930.

After the pumping and electric generation facilities had been moved to another location, the pump house was abandoned. By 1970, the building was in complete disrepair, and a portion of one wall had fallen in. The building was slated for demolition. However, in 1972, Dr. and Mrs. William Shorey of Chicago offered to lease the property from the village for twenty years to serve as their cottage, in exchange for restoring the building. The village agreed, and the couple removed the old equipment, redid brickwork, installed a new roof and new floor, and converted the building into a cottage.

By 1992 the lease had expired and William Shorey had died. The city leased the pump house to the Saugatuck-Douglas History Center, who refurbished the interior and opened it as the Pump House Museum. In 2001, the Society added an entrance pavilion. Inside the Museum, volunteers design and construct a new exhibit every year, focusing on local history.

== Description ==
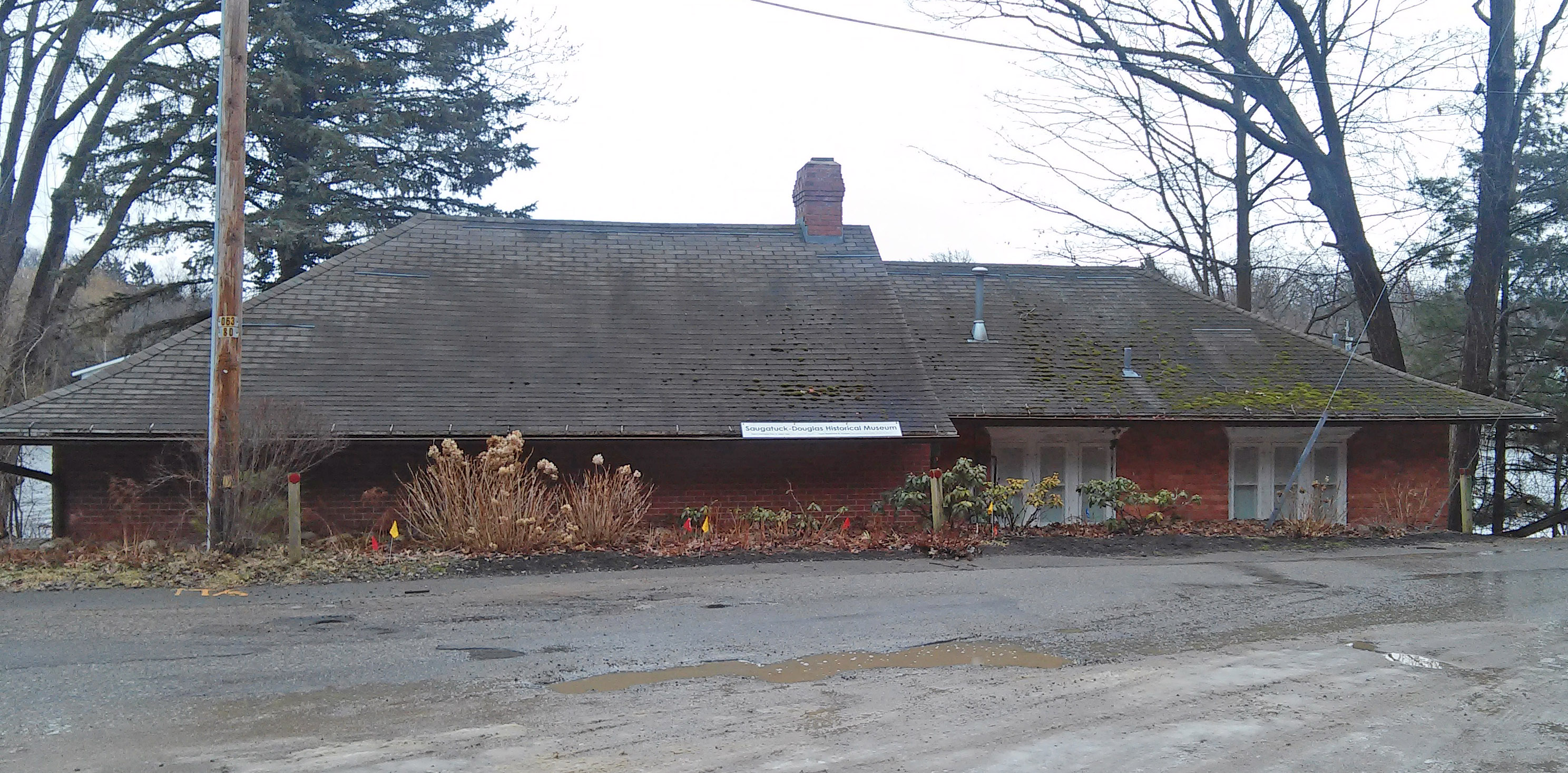
Road side of pump house

The Saugatuck Pump House is a single story red brick structure with a hipped roof on a concrete and block foundation. The building was constructed in two parts, and measures 58 feet in length along the river sides by 27 feet wide (in the 1912 north section) or 22 feet wide (in the 1904 south section). It is located on the west bank of the Kalamazoo River, across from downtown Saugatuck. The hipped roof ends in flaring eaves with wide overhangs and exposed rafter ends. Four sets of triple windows topped by white-painted colonial caps are located on the river side. Two triple windows and two double windows are in the low road side. The roof, originally clad with slate, is covered with asphalt shingles.

The interior is divided into two connected rooms and a small bathroom. It still contains the original wood-finished ceilings, along with some original exposed brick walls. Other sections of the interior are finished with sheetrock. A paved entry trail and small garden are outside the building.
