= Sarah Lowe Stedman House =

- U.S. National Register of Historic Places
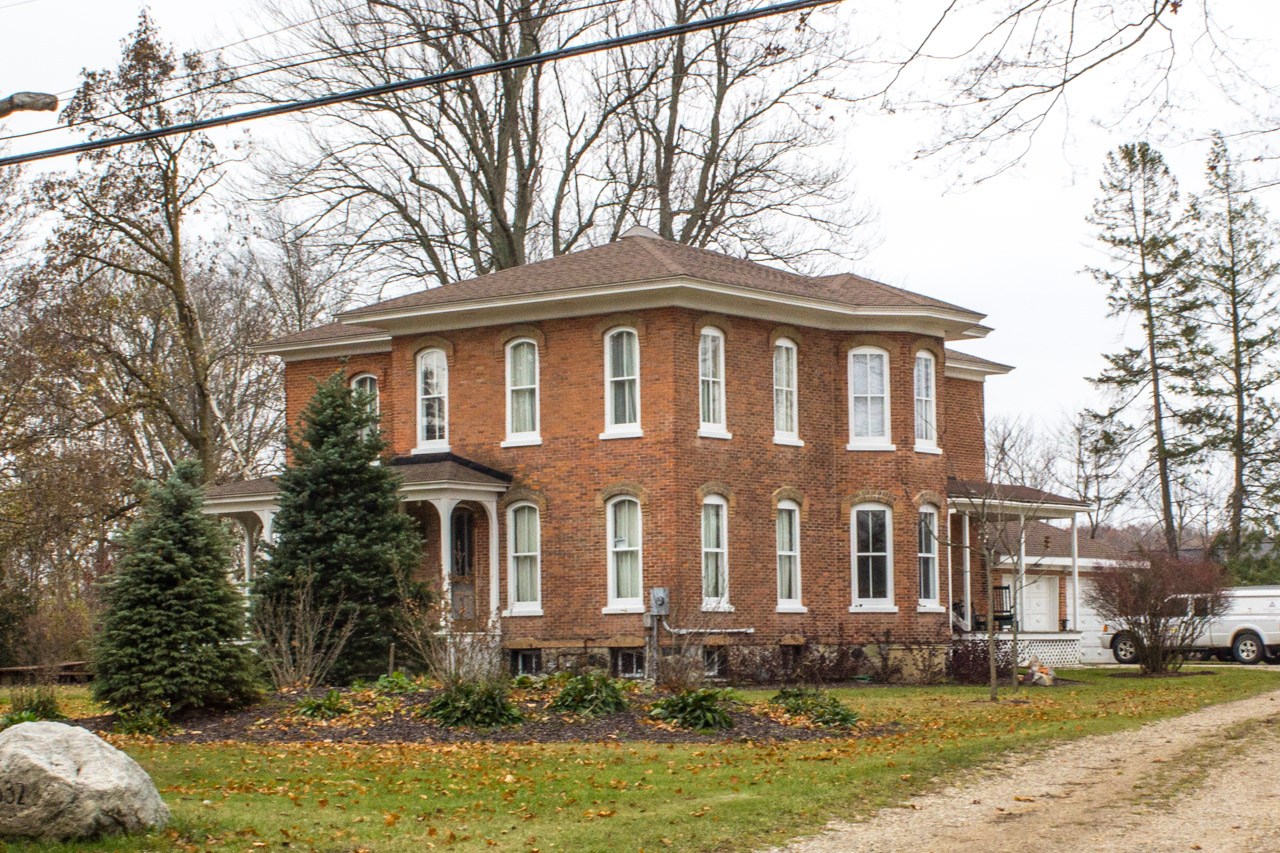

- Location within Michigan Location within the United States
- Interactive map
- Location: 632 Grand St., Allegan, Michigan
- Coordinates: 42°31′59″N 85°50′5″W
- Area: 2 acres (0.81 ha)
- Built: 1857
- Architectural style: Italianate
- MPS: Allegan MRA
- NRHP reference No.: 87000266
- Added to NRHP: March 12, 1987

The Sarah Lowe Stedman House is a private house located at 632 Grand Street in Allegan, Michigan. It was added to the National Register of Historic Places in 1987.

== History ==
The Sarah Lowe Stedman House is located on a tract of land first purchased by James Lowe in 1834. In 1857, Sarah Lowe Stedman constructed this house on the property. In 1898, local attorney and circuit court judge Philip Padgham purchased the house and enlarged it.

== Description ==
The Sarah Lowe Stedman House is a two-story L-shaped brick Italianate house on a masonry foundation. It has a low-pitched hipped roof and tall windows with segmental-arch window caps. It has a pair of entry porches and bay windows on two sides. The ell portion was added in 1898.
