= Coral Gables (Saugatuck, Michigan) =

- Leiendecker's Inn–Coral Gables
- U.S. National Register of Historic Places
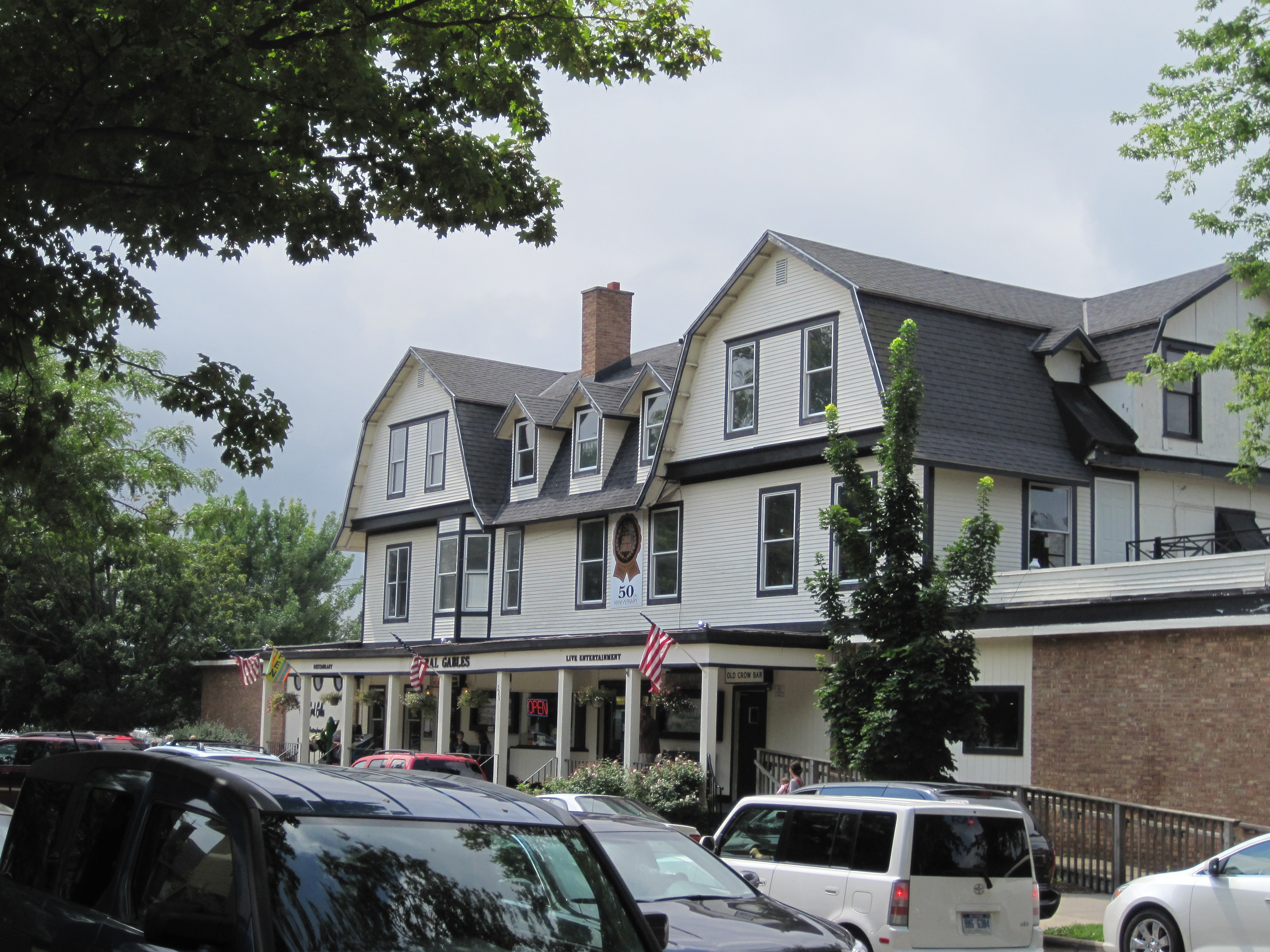

- Location within Michigan Location within the United States
- Interactive map
- Location: 220 Water St., Saugatuck, Michigan
- Coordinates: 42°39′21″N 86°12′21″W
- Area: 1 acre (0.40 ha)
- Built: 1900
- Architect: William K. Johnston
- Architectural style: Queen Anne
- NRHP reference No.: 09000520
- Added to NRHP: July 16, 2009

Coral Gables (previously Leiendecker's Inn) is a historic restaurant and resort located at 220 Water Street in Saugatuck, Michigan. It was listed on the National Register of Historic Places in 2009.

== History ==
In the 1890s, the Lake Michigan shore was experiencing a tourism boom as summer resorters arrived from Chicago and other communities. The Saugatuck–Douglas area was no exception, and the 1896 construction of an interurban line from Holland provided an easy connection for visitors. In 1898 the current waterfront site of Coral Gables contained a saloon, but in July 1898 the Leiendecker Brothers of Chicago bought the two-lot property for $3750 (equivalent to $120,345 in 2024). The firm (represented by Edward J. Leiendecker) kept the saloon open, and added a two-story hotel and dock. Business boomed in 1899, and at the end of the tourist season, Leiendecker moved the saloon and began enlarging the hotel even further. However, in early 1900, the entire complex burned down, likely due to the use of salamander heaters during construction.

Leiendecker immediately began working on a new structure, engaging architect William K. Johnston of Chicago to design the current structure. The foundation was complete by early May 1900, and the first rooms, located in the south wing of the structure, were ready to be occupied in June. However, construction on the remaining portions of the structure, now dubbed Leiendecker's Inn, was not started until late 1905. The new inn was formally opened on June 1, 1906.

However, in 1907, Saugatuck voters decided to make the town dry, which likely affected profits at Leiendecker's Inn. In 1911, Leiendecker tried to sell the hotel, but with no buyers, instead leased it to J.F. Hall, who renamed it the Columbia Hotel. However, after the 1915 SS Eastlast disaster, the hotel lost money in the 1916 season, and closed at the end of the year. It remained vacant until 1920, when Francis Horrigan bought the building, renaming it the Hotel Saugatuck. He ran the hotel until 1928, when it was sold to Edson Crow. Crow, a restaurateur, built up the restaurant and lounge in the building, and ran it with his brother Dale until after both had died. In 1958, the property was sold to Thomas A. Johnson, who owned a popular East Lansing restaurant and night club known as Coral Gables. Johnson enlarged and renovated the restaurant, and opened a separate, smaller restaurant in the basement, as well as another bar.

Johnson continued to expand the restaurant and performing areas. By the early 1970s, the hotel function of the building was discontinued, with the former hotel rooms then primarily used for storage. Thomas Johnson died in 1979, leaving the establishment to his sons Topper and Michael. Topper Johnson managed the building until his own death in 1985. Michael Johnson then assumed management, and continued to expand and update the dining and entertainment options in the building.

== Description ==
Coral Gables is a rectangular building standing on a lot which slopes downward to the Kalamazoo River, such that the basement is on ground level at the rear of the building. The central part of the building, the old hotel, has a U plan above the ground floor, with the base of the U at the front of the building. A tall cross-gambrel roof contains the third story in the front of the building and the wings of the U. There are gables at the front and back of each leg of the U, and another gable near the center of each leg. The front roof between the two front gables contains three smaller gabled dormers, with additional dormers on the wings.

The hotel front of the hotel on the first floor is clad with vertical boarding and contains large picture windows and some older double-hung units. The widows in the remainder of the building are set in an irregular pattern, and are double-hung one-over-one units in square-head openings. There are three main entrances, one in the center of the front, and one under each front gable. A single-story porch with square wood posts and wrought-iron railing' likely installed c. 1960, runs the full length of the front of the building. Single-story additions are located on each side of the building.

On the interior, the main floor and a basement level house a main dining room, a bar/dancing/billiard room, a basement-level bar, and a snack bar. The second and third stories contain hotel rooms, which are now primarily used for storage.
