= Pritchard's Outlook Historic District =

Historic district in Michigan, United States

- U.S. National Register of Historic Places
- U.S. Historic district
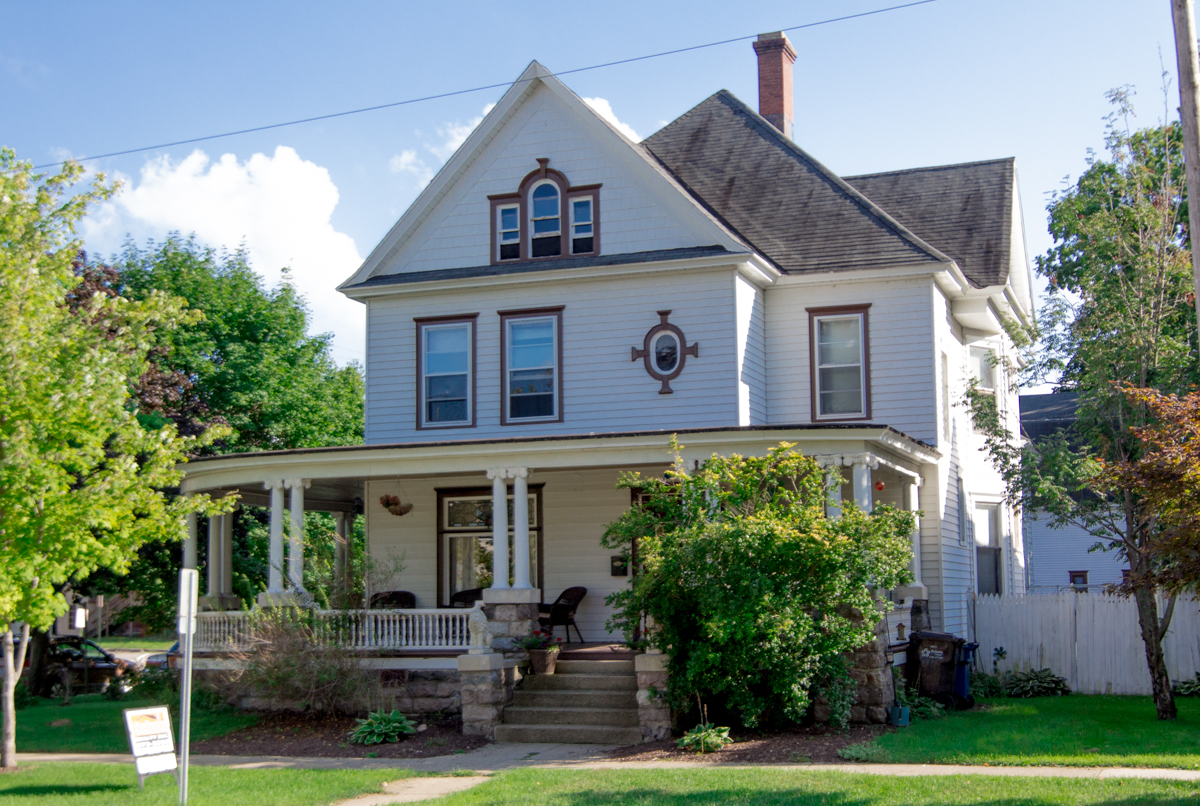
- Orson G. Vahue House (203 Cutler)

- Location within Michigan Location within the United States
- Interactive map showing the location for Pritchard’s Outlook Historic District
- Location: Roughly bounded by Park Dr., Walnut, Crescent, and Davis Sts., Allegan, Michigan
- Coordinates: 42°31′46″N 85°51′20″W
- Area: 19.8 acres (8.0 ha)
- Built: 1836
- Architectural style: Late 19th And 20th Century Revivals, Late Victorian
- MPS: Allegan MRA
- NRHP reference No.: 87000265
- Added to NRHP: July 8, 1987

Pritchard's Outlook Historic District is a primarily residential historic district, roughly bounded by Park Drive, Walnut Street, Crescent Street, and Davis Street, in Allegan, Michigan. It was added to the National Register of Historic Places in 1987.

== History ==
The first houses built in Allegan were constructed for the Allegan Company in what is now the mill area in the heart of the city in 1836. As the commercial district there grew, at least four of these houses were moved to new locations within what is now the Pritchard's Outlook Historic District. These four houses still exist, located at 220 Pine, 500 Cedar, 334 Cutler, and 416 Cutler. A short time after the Allegan Company houses were built, John Askins, a carpenter and millwright from Rochester, New York, built his private home downtown. In 1863, it was moved to 417 Monroe.

In 1838 and 1839, some of the first houses with in the district were built at 409 and 415 Monroe. Reflecting the influx of residents into Allegan, more houses were constructed through the 1860s and 1870s, representing a broad range of building and architectural types, and housing many of Allegan's prominent early settlers. Early residents include foundry owner Alby Rossman, O. T. Booth, merchant Albert Stegeman, Colonel Elisha Mix, Colonel William Williams, and General Benjamin Pritchard. Allegan grew slowly in the 1880s, and few houses date to this period. However, growth restarted in the late 1890s and early 1900s, and later structures in the neighborhood date to the first portion of the 20th century.

== Description ==
Pritchard's Outlook Historic District is a large residential historic district located near Allegan's central business district. The district contains 223 structures, including 204 residences, eleven carriage houses, six churches, three office buildings, a fire station, and a school. Of these 223 structures, 206 contribute to the historic character of the neighborhood. The streets are narrow and lined with large trees, with predominantly frame houses in a range of sizes and styles. The bulk of the houses within the district date from 1850 to 1900, and primarily include Italianate, Queen Anne, and Colonial Revival architectural styles. However, the district also contains Greek Revival, and Gothic Revival, and Craftsman buildings, as well as a smattering of other styles.

The district includes the oldest houses still extant in Allegan, which were moved from their original location near downtown. It also includes the oldest houses in the city still located on their original foundations. Particularly significant are four of the churches in the district:

- Seventh-Day Adventist Church (229 Cutler) The oldest church in Allegan is a frame Greek Revival and Italianate structure built in 1863. It has an octagonal belfry, twelve-over-twelve windows, corner pilasters and a fanlight above the pilastered entry.
- First Presbyterian Church (200 Cutler) This brick Romanesque Revival structure, with a tall spire was built in 1875.
- First Congregational Church (323 Cutler) This frame Gothic structure, built in 1882, has a pair of towers in the front.
- Blessed Sacrament Catholic Church (439 Trowbridge) This idiosyncratic Romanesque church was built in 1935.

== Gallery ==
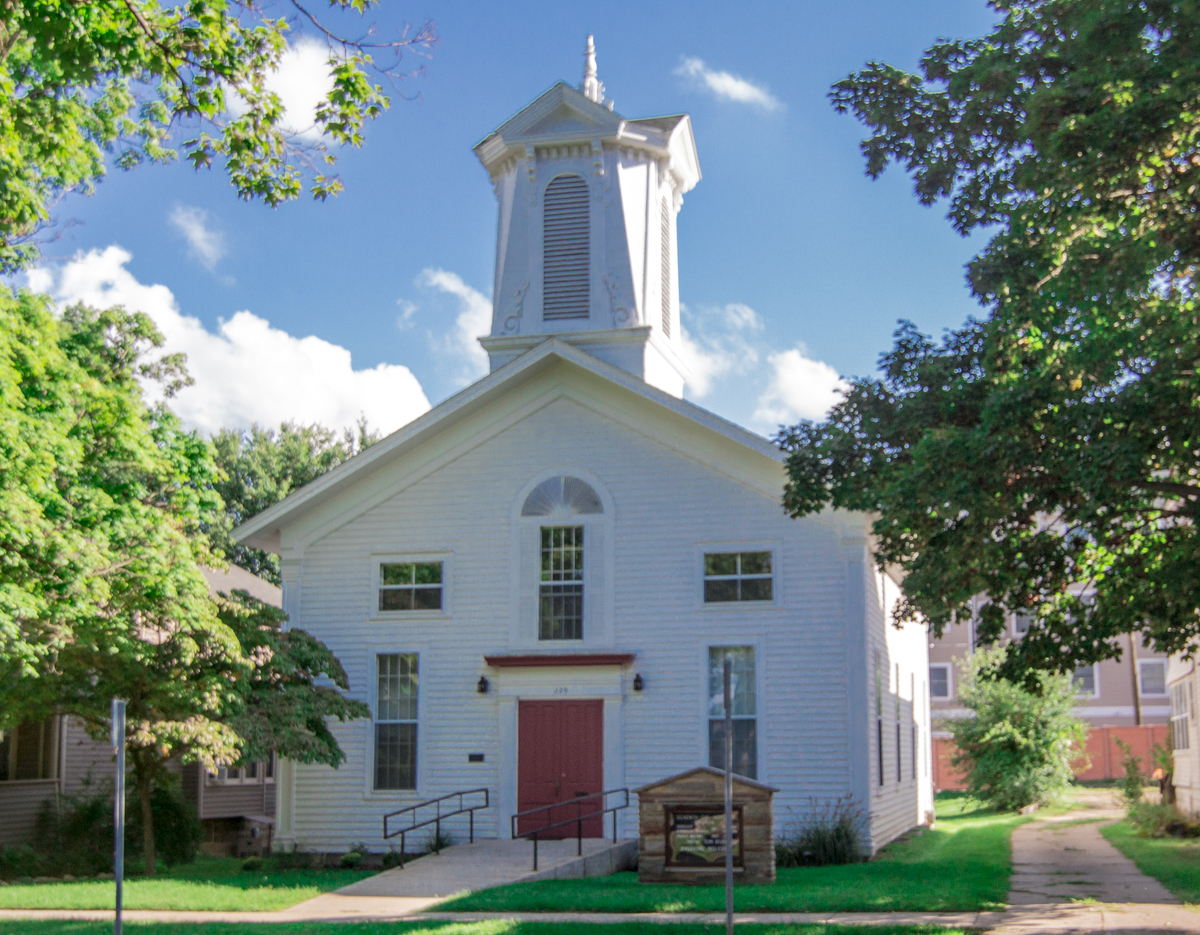
Seventh Day Adventist Church (229 Cutler Street)

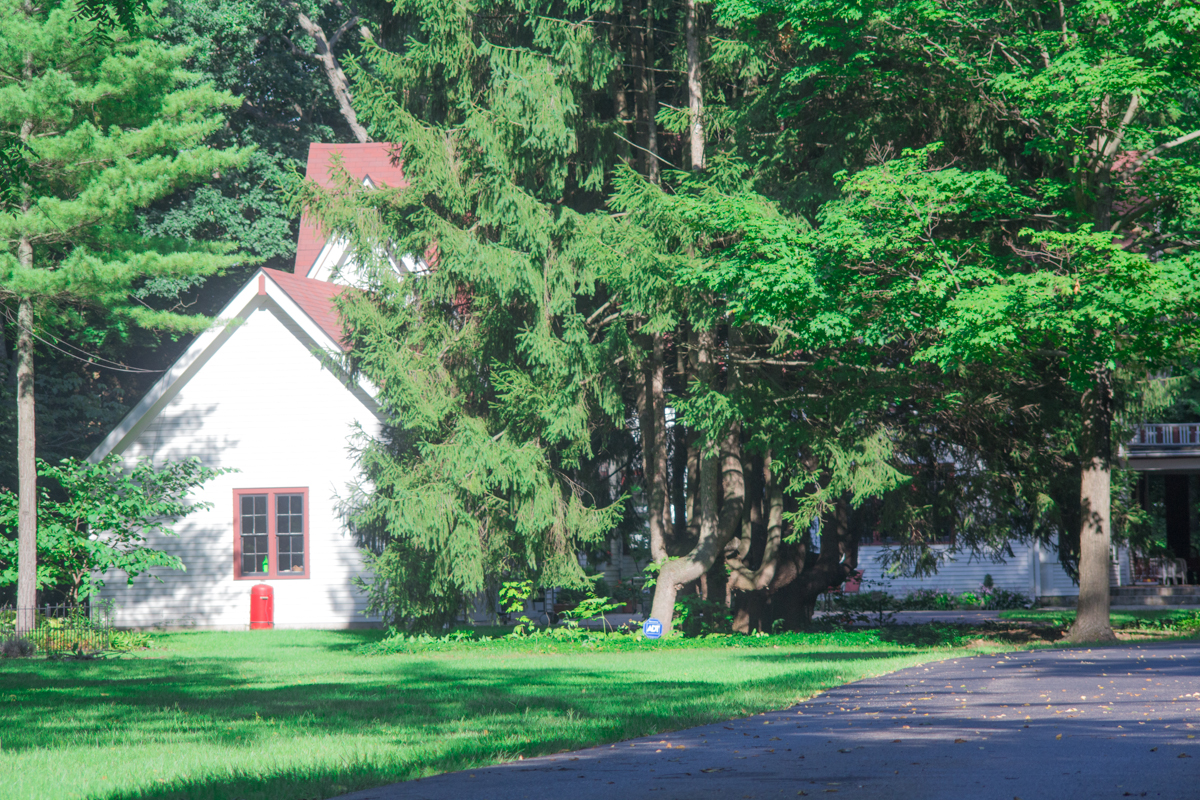
General Benjamin Pritchard House (330 Davis Street)

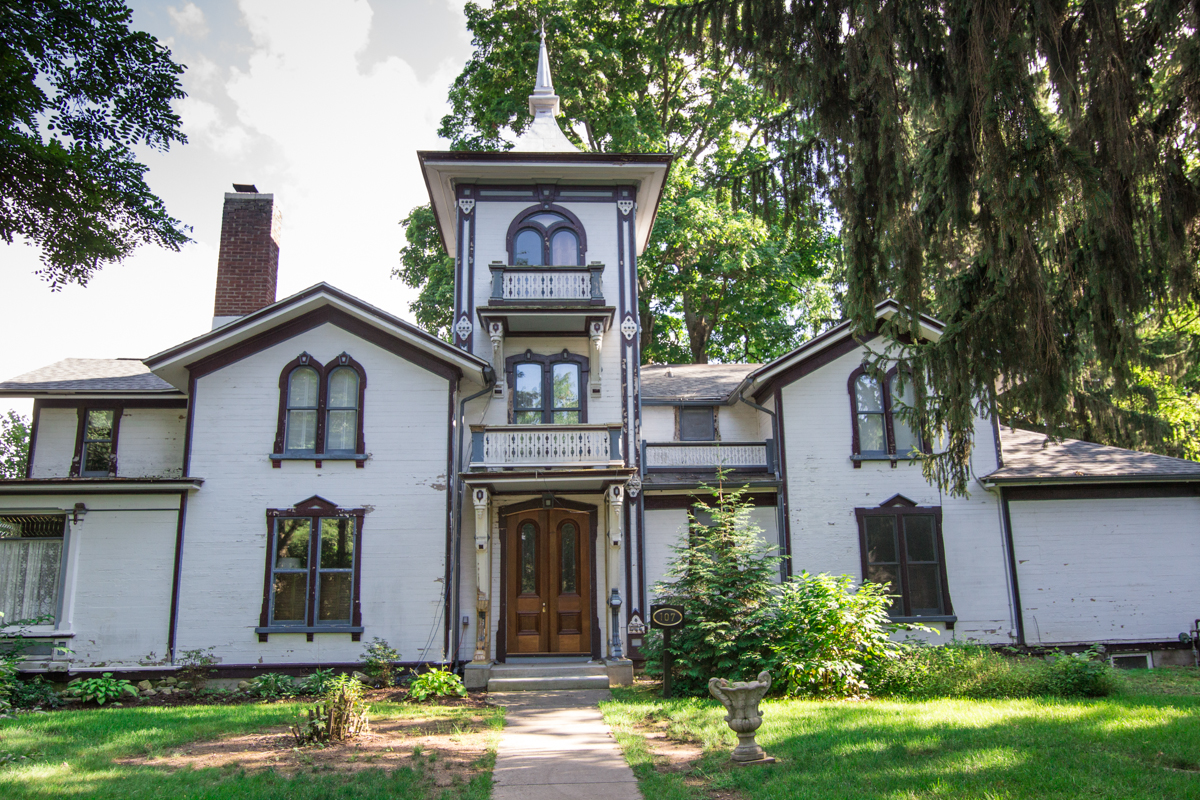
Hollister Marsh Jr. House (107 Delano Street)

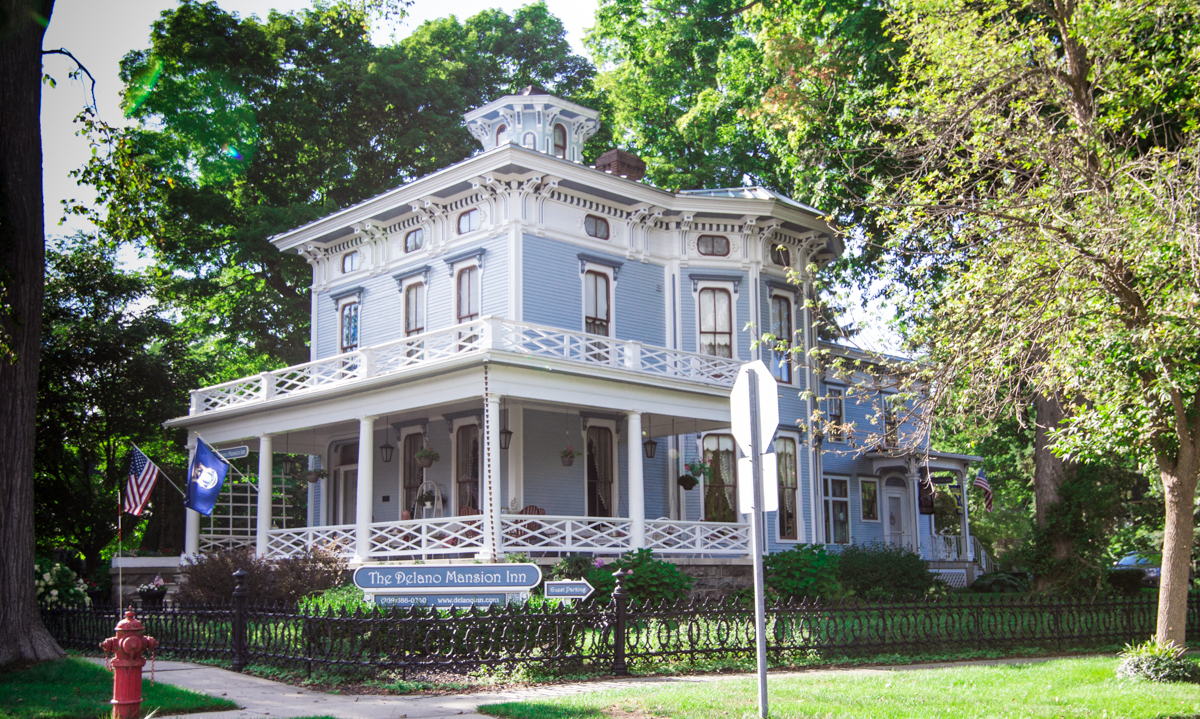
Delano House (302 Cutler Street)
