= Augustus Lilly House =

- U.S. National Register of Historic Places
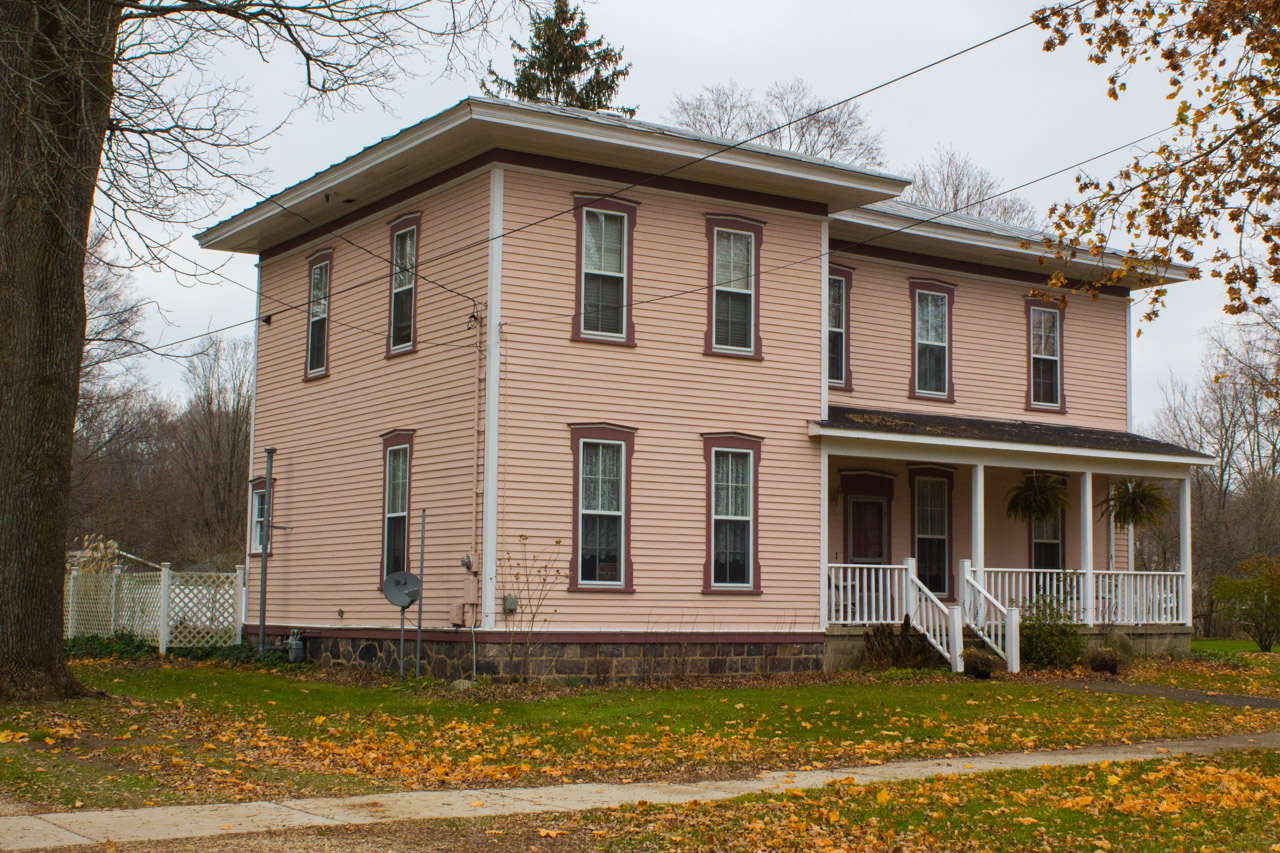

- Location within Michigan Location within the United States
- Interactive map
- Location: 132 Cora St., Allegan, Michigan
- Coordinates: 42°32′17″N 85°50′41″W
- Area: less than one acre
- Built: 1870; 156 years ago
- Architectural style: Italianate, Vernacular Italianate
- MPS: Allegan MRA
- NRHP reference No.: 87000254
- Added to NRHP: March 12, 1987; 39 years ago

The Augustus Lilly House is a private house located at 132 Cora Street in Allegan, Michigan. It was added to the National Register of Historic Places in 1987.

== History ==
Augustus Lilly was a farmer until he enlisted to fight in the Civil War. When he returned to Allegan, he partnered with Irving F. Clapp, and the pair opened a grocery store in Allegan. Lilly constructed this house in 1870.

== Description ==
The Augustus Lilly House is a two-story L-shaped frame Italianate house with clapboard siding and a masonry foundation. The house has a low-pitched hipped roof.
