= J. F. Eesley Milling Co. Flour Mill–Elevator =

- Eesley, J. F., Milling Co. Flour Mill--Elevator
- U.S. National Register of Historic Places
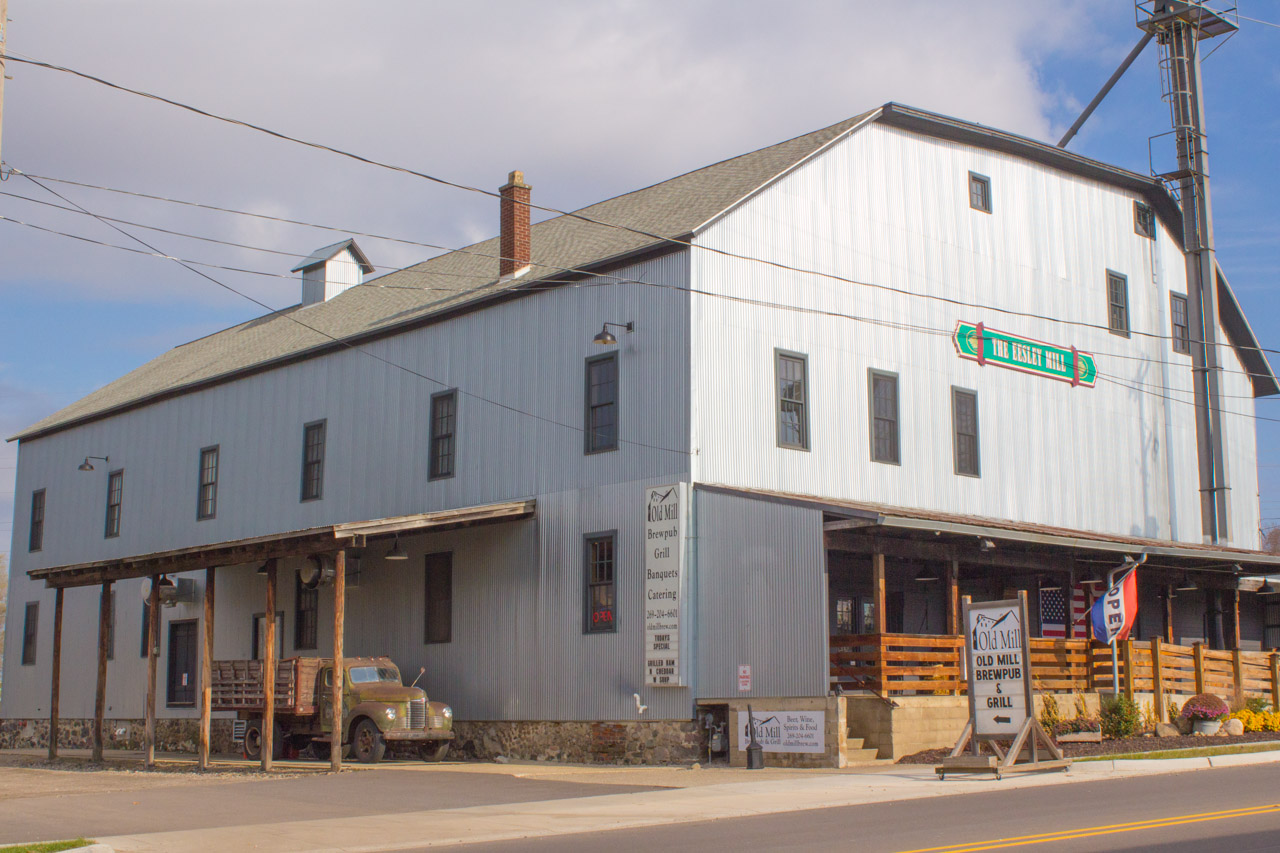

- Location within Michigan Location within the United States
- Interactive map
- Location: 717 E. Bridge St., Plainwell, Michigan
- Coordinates: 42°26′35″N 85°37′54″W
- Area: less than one acre
- Built: 1870
- MPS: Plainwell MPS
- NRHP reference No.: 91001547
- Added to NRHP: November 1, 1991

The J. F. Eesley Milling Co. Flour Mill–Elevator (later the Plainwell Elevator Company) was built as a flour mill located at 717 East Bridge Street in Plainwell, Michigan. The building has been renovated and houses a brewpub. It was listed on the National Register of Historic Places in 1991.

== History ==
The building which houses the flour mill at this site was originally built in about 1869 at a site on the south side of Bridge Street, purportedly to house a roller rink. The elevator was built at this site in about 1870-73 by an original owner who has not been identified. In 1891, John F. Eesley (then the operator of the nearby D. B. Merrill flour mill) partnered with three other local entrepreneurs to establish the Sunshine Flour mill at the Bridge Street site. In 1903, Eesley moved the mill building from its original site to the current site, joining it to the elevator which was already at this location. He renovated both buildings to create a single structure.

At its height, the mill produced 600 barrels of buckwheat flour per day, making it the second largest producer of buckwheat flour in the nation. Eesley operated the mill at this site until his death in 1929. Shortly after, the mill was taken over by the Plainwell Elevator Company. The Plainwell Elevator Company operated the building until at least the 1990s. The building has been renovated and houses a brewpub.

== Description ==
The Eesley Mill and Elevator consists of two structures built separately and joined in 1903. The entire structure is a three-story building with a broad fronted and a massive timber frame. The mill section has a gable roof, the elevator part a gambrel roof. An addition that has a slightly sloping roofline connects the two portions of the structure. The exterior is covered with clapboard siding, and has double-hung, square-head, sash windows. A cinder block loading platform sheltered with an overhang runs the length of the building on one side. There is a single-story extension at the back of the elevator building.
