= West Bridge Street Historic District =

Historic district in Michigan, United States

- U.S. National Register of Historic Places
- U.S. Historic district
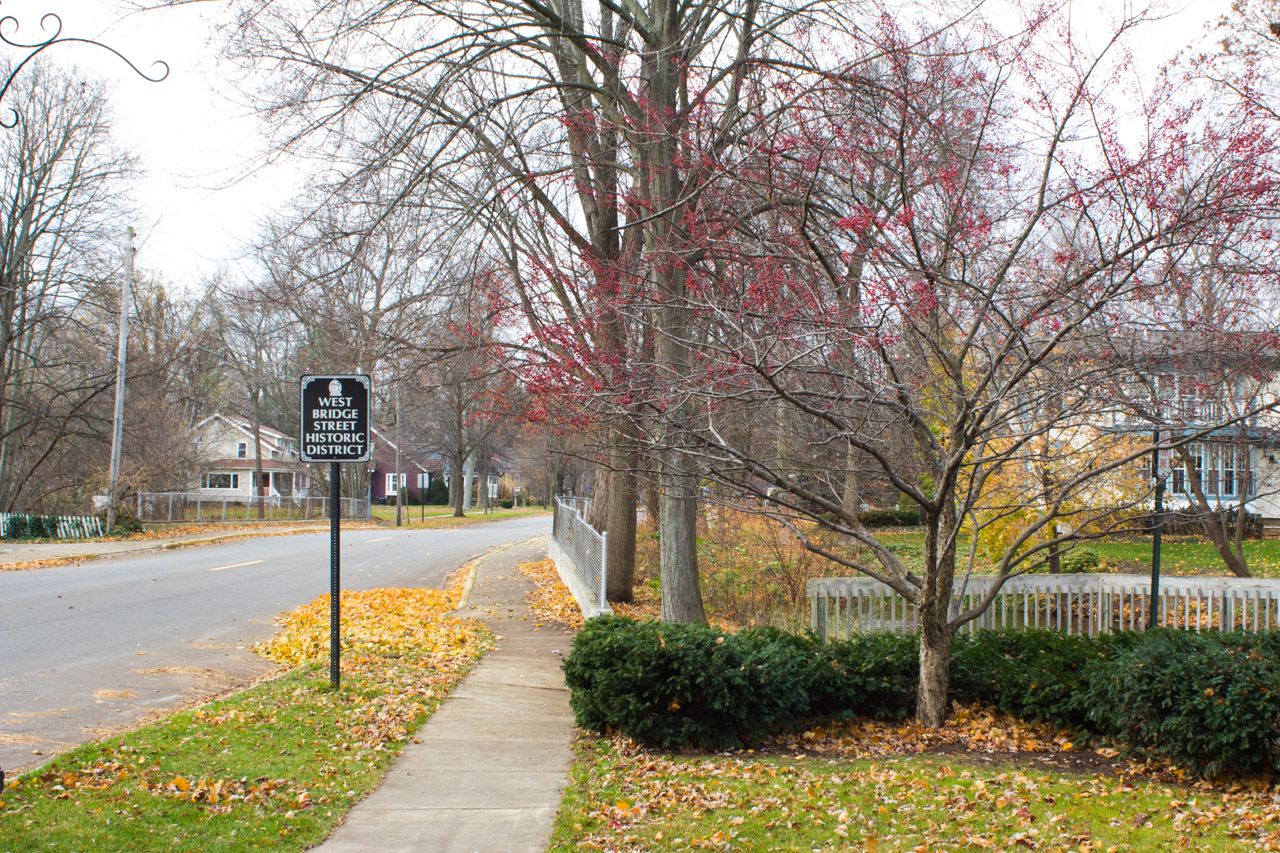

- Location within Michigan Location within the United States
- Interactive map
- Location: 320, 414–550 and 321–563 W. Bridge St., Plainwell, Michigan
- Coordinates: 42°26′32″N 85°38′57″W
- Area: 18 acres (7.3 ha)
- Architectural style: Colonial Revival, Bungalow/craftsman, Italianate
- MPS: Plainwell MPS
- NRHP reference No.: 91001549
- Added to NRHP: November 1, 1991

The West Bridge Street Historic District is a residential historic district containing structures located at 320, 414–550 and 321–563 West Bridge Street in Plainwell, Michigan, United States. It was listed on the National Register of Historic Places in 1991.

== History ==
West Bridge Street is one of three areas in Plainwell where the large and imposing homes of the community's successful merchants are located. Many of the larger homes in the district, including 405, 439, 519, 527, 530, and 551 West Bridge Street, were constructed some time just before 1873. Additional houses were constructed through the remainder of the 19th century and into the first decade of the 20th.

The district also contains the former Bridge Street School, constructed in 1910 on a plot which had been used for school purposes since the 1860s. This school has been converted into living units.

== Description ==
The West Bridge Street Historic District extends along West Bridge Street beginning at the mill race. The district contains 29 19th- and early 20th-century residences, as well as a 1910 red brick school building. The school and 27 of the 29 houses contribute to the historic character of the district. The houses are primarily two-story frame structures set on large lots and located well back from the street. The district includes an eclectic mix of architectural styles and house sizes. There are a number of early Italianate houses, including one built by L. H. Woodhams, with a square cupola, as well as Colonial Revival structures such as the Gilkey house, Upright and Wing houses, Queen Anne houses, Foursquare houses, and a craftsman half-timbered bungalow.
