= Downtown Allegan Historic District =

Historic district in Michigan, United States

- U.S. National Register of Historic Places
- U.S. Historic district
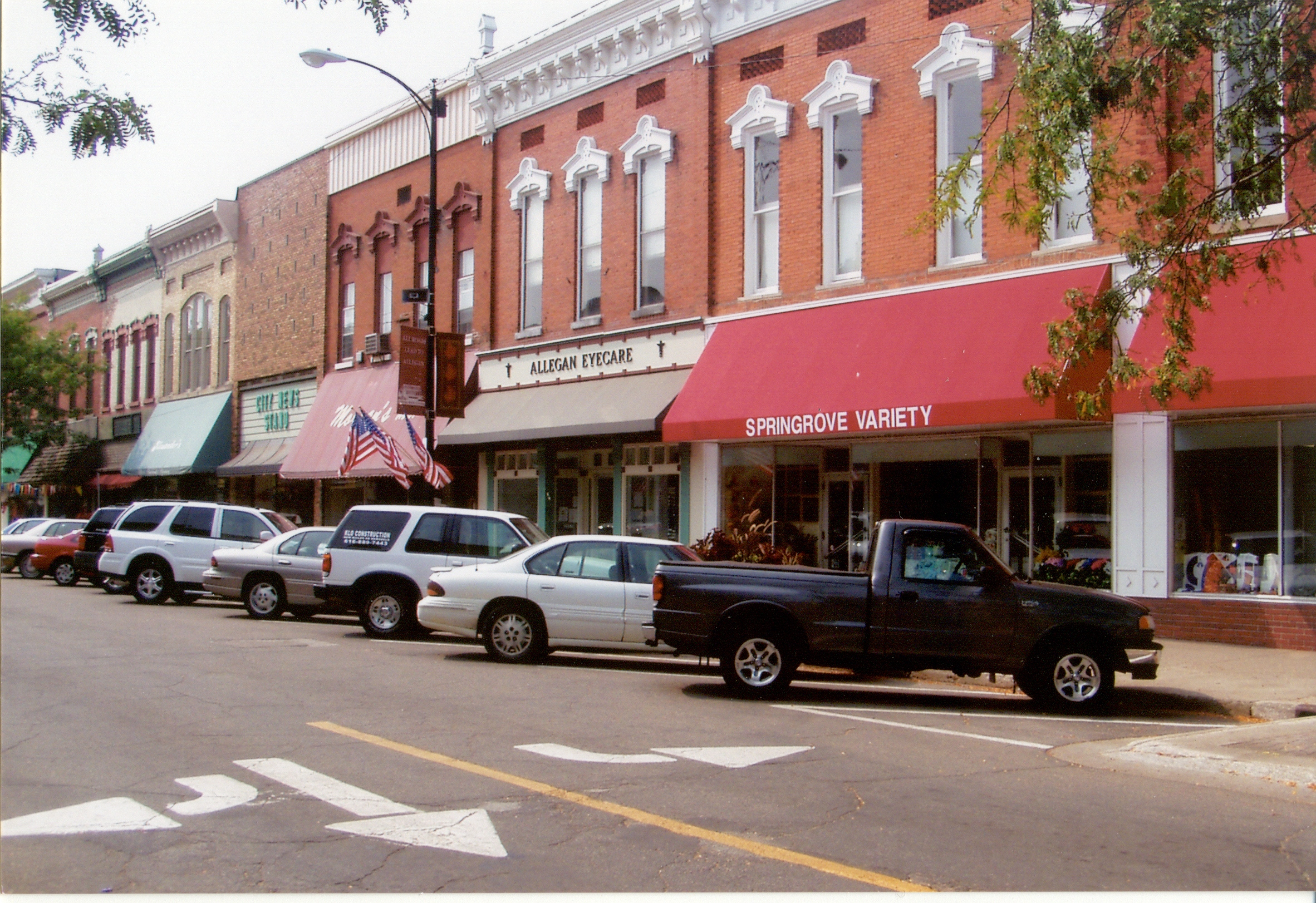
- 100 Block of Locust Street

- Location within Michigan Location within the United States
- Interactive map
- Location: Roughly bounded by Trowbridge, Locust, Hubbard, Brady, and Water Sts., Allegan, Michigan
- Coordinates: 42°31′39″N 85°50′58″W
- Area: 13 acres (5.3 ha)
- Built: 1855
- Architectural style: Late Victorian, Italianate, Commercial Italianate
- MPS: Allegan MRA
- NRHP reference No.: 87000251
- Added to NRHP: March 12, 1987

The Downtown Allegan Historic District is a primarily commercial historic district, roughly bounded by Trowbridge, Locust, Hubbard, Brady, and Water Streets, in Allegan, Michigan. It was added to the National Register of Historic Places in 1987.

== History ==
The central portion of Allegan was platted in 1835. What is now the central business district began to developed in the late 1830s and 1840s, and was greatly enhanced by the opening of railroad lines in 1868–71. An 1869 fire cleared a large portion of Brady Street, allowing the 1870 construction of the Chaffee House, a three-story hotel. However, a devastating fire in March 1884 wiped out nearly the entire business district, leaving only a few buildings standing on Brady, including the Chaffee House. Nearly the entire business district was rebuilt in 1884–85.

A fire in 1902 destroyed the Chaffee block, and some of the other structures have been renovated of replaced in the years since the 1880s. However, the late 19th century character of the district remains largely intact.

== Description ==
The Downtown Allegan Historic District contains sixty-nine structures, fifty-seven of which contribute to the historic character of the district. A handful of the buildings pre-date the 1884 fire. These include a simple false-front structure at 422 Water Street, built in 1855, and the string of stores at 135, 145, 149, and 155 Brady, all constructed in 1874.

The bulk of the buildings in the district were built in the 1880s. These are typically two-story late Victorian brick commercial structures. Many of these have original upper facades, but store entrance levels have been remodeled. A last group of buildings in the district were built in the very early 1900s.
