= Marshall Street Historic District (Allegan, Michigan) =

Historic district in Michigan, United States

- U.S. National Register of Historic Places
- U.S. Historic district
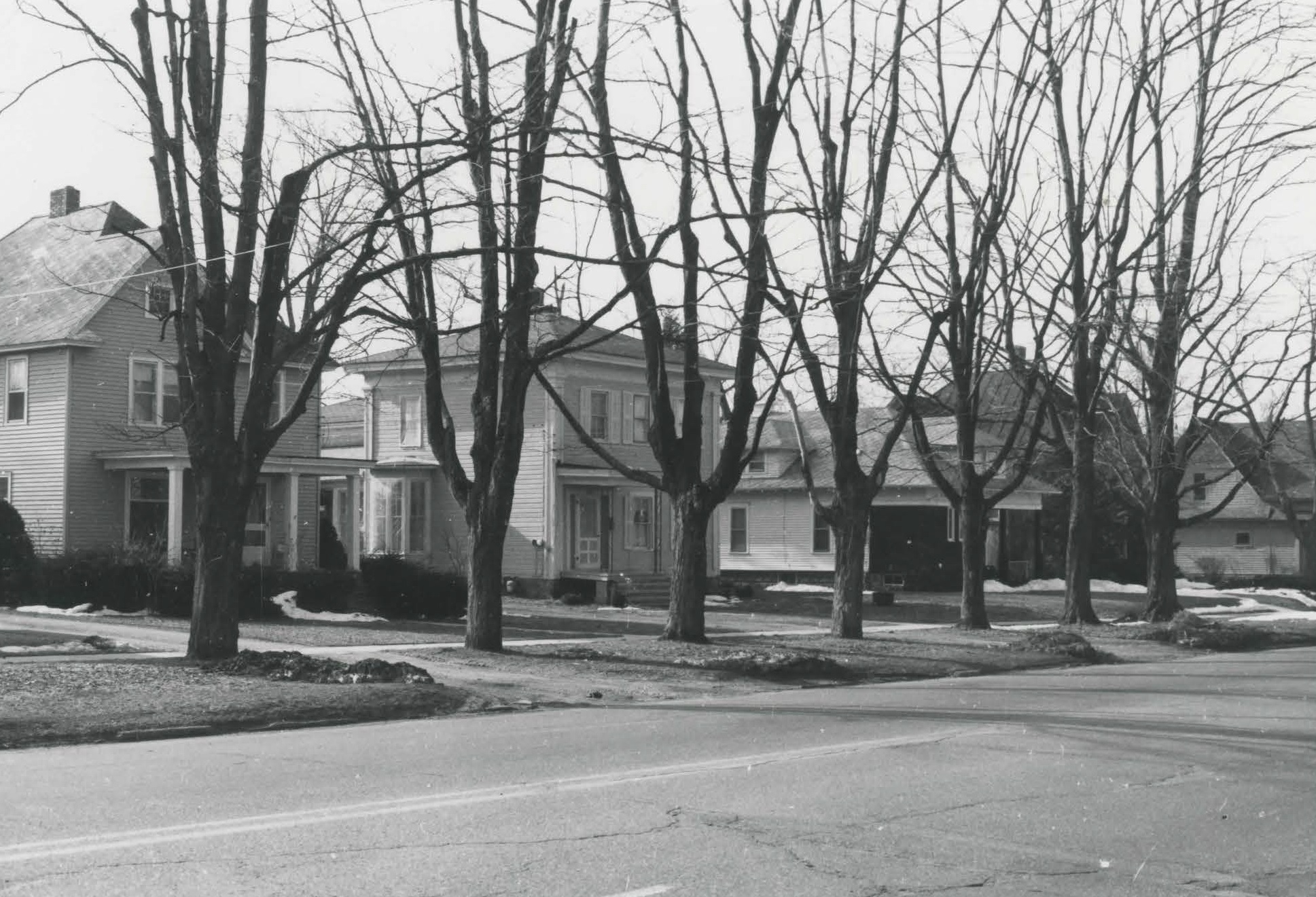

- Location within Michigan Location within the United States
- Interactive map
- Location: 231-237, 335-705, 232-630 Marshall St., Allegan, Michigan
- Coordinates: 42°31′16″N 85°50′34″W
- Area: 37.4 acres (15.1 ha)
- Built: 1836
- Architectural style: Late 19th And Early 20th Century American Movements, Late 19th And 20th Century Revivals, Late Victorian
- MPS: Allegan MRA
- NRHP reference No.: 87000256
- Added to NRHP: March 12, 1987

The Marshall Street Historic District is a primarily residential historic district located at 231-237, 335-705, and 232-630 Marshall Street in Allegan, Michigan. It was added to the National Register of Historic Places in 1987.

== Description ==
The Marshall Street Historic District is located on approximately seven city blocks along Marshall Street. It contains 57 structures, 56 of which contribute to the historic character of the district. Houses in the district are built in a range of architectural styles, including bungalows, Queen Anne, Italianate, and Colonial Revival houses, with some Dutch Colonial Revival, American Foursquare, and Greek Revival included. Most of the houses are wood frame covered with clapboard, although there are some houses built of brick or other construction.

== History ==
Marshall Street was originally an Indian trail, and when Allegan was founded in the 1830s the trail was surveyed and improved. By 1852, the increasing traffic necessitated improvement, and a plank road was installed. As Allegan grew, residents began to build homes along Marshall, and the earliest buildings in the district were constructed (or moved to their current site) in the 1860s. In 1869, Alby Rossman constructed his home at 524 Marshall, and platted the surrounding area as the "Rossman Addition." Rossman's house anchors the center of the district. Rossman's construction precipitated a boom in house building along Marshall Street, with a number of both well-to-do and middle-class families building houses in the area after the Civil War.

Allegan's growth slowed in the latter part of the 19th century, and few of the hoses in the district date from the 1880s or 1890s. After the turn of the century, construction again picked up, with more houses built. Significantly, in 1890 the "John Robinson Hospital" (now the Elks Club) was built at the southern end of the district. A number of bungalows were built in the district in the 1910s and 1920s.
