= List of Michigan State Historic Sites in Cass County =

Location of Cass County in Michigan

The following is a list of Michigan State Historic Sites in Cass County, Michigan. Sites marked with a dagger (†) are also listed on the National Register of Historic Places in Cass County, Michigan.

== Current listings ==
Name	Image	Location	City	Listing date
Cass County Courthouse		110 North Broadway Street	Cassopolis	December 14, 1976
Cass County Office Building/Masonic Temple		105 North Broadway Street	Cassopolis	July 23, 1985
Centennial Hall Building		101-117 West Main Street	Marcellus	March 19, 1980
Chain Lake Baptist Church and Cemetery	Chain Lake Baptist Cemetery and Church	16853 Chain Lake Street	Calvin Township	December 5, 1986
District Schoolhouse	District Schoolhouse	17049 US-12	Edwardsburg	August 23, 1980
First Methodist Episcopal Church		31994 Middlecrossing Road	Silver Creek Township	July 18, 1996
First Universalist Church of Dowagiac		306 Courtland Street	Dowagiac	September 8, 1982
Jarius Hitchcox House		15197 US-12	Union	December 10, 1971
Indian Lake Cemetery		School Street at Sink Road	Silver Creek Township	March 15, 1990
Carroll Sherman and Bessie E. Jones House†		170 West Main Street	Marcellus	January 17, 1986
George Washington Jones House†		180 West Main Street	Marcellus	January 17, 1986
Joseph Webster Lee House		69302 Elkhart Road	Ontwa Township	March 19, 1987
Mason District No. 5 Schoolhouse†		17049 US-12	Mason Township	June 10, 1980
Methodist Episcopal Church† / The Old Rugged Cross		61041 Vermont Street	Pokagon	January 20, 2000
George Newton House†		20689 Marcellus Highway	Marcellus	November 14, 1974
Poe's Corners Informational Designation		Intersection of Patterson Hill Road and Born Street	Newberg Township	March 21, 1991
The Presbyterian Church		68961 Lake Street	Edwardsburg	April 20, 2000
Sylvador T. Read House		529 East State Street	Cassopolis	June 10, 1980
Sacred Heart of Mary Catholic Church		Southeast corner of Leach and Priest roads	Silver Creek Township	January 16, 1976
Smith's Chapel and Cemetery†		29858 Redfield Road	Milton Township	April 24, 1979
Sumnerville Cemetery / Sumnerville Mounds	Sumnerville Cemetery-Since 1830	33013 Pokagon Highway	Niles	January 20, 2000
Underground Railroad Informational Designation		Bonine Elk Park, M-60, 1/2 mile west of Vandalia	Vandalia	January 19, 1957
Wayne Township School District No. 7 School	Wayne Township School District No. 7 School	24020 Flanders St	Wayne Township	April 19, 1990

== See also ==
- National Register of Historic Places listings in Cass County, Michigan

== Sources ==
- Historic Sites Online – Cass County. Michigan State Housing Developmental Authority. Accessed January 23, 2011.
