= National Register of Historic Places listings in Cass County, Michigan =

Location of Cass County in Michigan

This is a list of the National Register of Historic Places in Cass County, Michigan. This is intended to be a complete list of the properties and districts on the National Register of Historic Places in Cass County, Michigan, United States. Latitude and longitude coordinates are provided for many National Register properties and districts; these locations may be seen together in a map.

There are 10 properties and districts listed on the National Register in the county.

This National Park Service list is complete through NPS recent listings posted September 26, 2025.

== Current listings ==
	Name on the Register	Image	Date listed	Location	City or town	Description
1	Criffield-Whiteley House	Criffield-Whiteley House	December 6, 2016 (#16000818)	601 Main St. 41°59′06″N 86°07′01″W	Dowagiac	The Criffield–Whiteley House, constructed in 1897, is a 2-1/2-story Queen Anne house sitting on a rubble fieldstone foundation which is made from large, carefully fitted pieces.
2	First Methodist Episcopal Church of Pokagon†	First Methodist Episcopal Church of Pokagon†	April 1, 2002 (#02000295)	60041 Vermont St. 41°54′43″N 86°10′26″W	Pokagon Township	In 1876, this building was converted from a hop barn into a church. It is significant as the 1903 location of the first performance of George Bennard's hymn "The Old Rugged Cross." In 1914, it was sold and converted back to storage; restoration began in 1998.
3	Carroll and Bessie E. (Caul) Jones House†	Carroll and Bessie E. (Caul) Jones House†	December 1, 1997 (#97001482)	170 W. Main St. 42°01′38″N 85°49′00″W	Marcellus	This house is a two-story structure with both Dutch Colonial Revival and Romanesque Revival elements. It was built for Carroll Sherman Jones, the son of Marcellus founder George Washington Jones, and his wife Bessie between 1898 and 1900 from a design by the Detroit architectural firm of Alan C. Varney.
4	G. W. Jones House†	G. W. Jones House†	December 9, 1994 (#94001427)	180 W. Main St. 42°01′38″N 85°49′02″W	Marcellus	This house was built for Marcellus founder George Washington Jones in 1888. He lived here until his death in 1896.
5	M-86–Prairie River Bridge	M-86–Prairie River Bridge	February 4, 2000 (#00000044)	Crystal Springs Street over the Dowagiac River; 41°55′31″N 86°12′22″W	Sumnerville	This bridge was moved in 2016/2016 from M-86 over the Prairie River near Nottawa, Michigan in St. Joseph County 50 miles away to Crystal Springs Street over the Dowagiac River in Cass County.
6	Mason District Number 5 Schoolhouse†	Mason District Number 5 Schoolhouse†	September 12, 1985 (#85002153)	17049 US 12; 41°46′34″N 85°53′52″W	Edwardsburg	Mason District Number 5 Schoolhouse is a former two room rural schoolhouse built in 1874; the school could hold up to 110 students. The school operated until 1959, and the building was transformed into the Mason Township Hall in 1964.
7	Michigan Central Railroad Dowagiac Depot	Michigan Central Railroad Dowagiac Depot	December 2, 1993 (#93001349)	200 Depot Dr. 41°58′51″N 86°06′33″W	Dowagiac	The Central Railroad Dowagiac Depot was built by the Michigan Central Railroad in 1903; a restoration project took place in 1995.
8	George Newton House†	George Newton House†	May 12, 1982 (#82002830)	20689 Marcellus Highway; 42°00′44″N 85°58′05″W	Marcellus	The George Newton House is significant as the home of prominent civic leader George Newton, the son of Cass County pioneer Col. James Newton. It currently operates as a museum.
9	Smith's Chapel†	Smith's Chapel†	December 31, 1987 (#87002224)	29858 Redfield Rd. 41°46′07″N 86°08′44″W	Milton Township	Smith's Chapel was constructed in 1840 by the local Methodist congregation, and named for Cannon Smith, who donated the land and contributed substantially toward the chapel's construction. The chapel is the oldest known church building in Cass County, and probably the oldest in southwest Michigan. The church was used regularly until 1967, and in 1972 Milton Township purchased the structure.
10	Thomson Road–Air Line Railroad Bridge	Thomson Road–Air Line Railroad Bridge	December 22, 1999 (#99001612)	Thompson Rd. over an abandoned railroad right-of-way 41°52′53″N 86°11′41″W	Howard Township	This bridge, built in 1919, is one of the oldest examples of a concrete T-beam bridge in Michigan, and the only historically significant bridge of the type having multiple spans. It also has a rare brick deck.

== See also ==
- List of National Historic Landmarks in Michigan
- National Register of Historic Places listings in Michigan
- Listings in neighboring counties: Berrien, Elkhart, St. Joseph, St. Joseph (IN), Van Buren
- List of Michigan State Historic Sites in Cass County, Michigan
