= Dowagiac Union School District =

School district in Michigan

Dowagiac Union Schools

Address
- 243 South Front Street Dowagiac, Cass, Michigan, 49047; United States

District information
- Grades: Pre-Kindergarten-12
- Superintendent: Gregory Blomgren
- Schools: 7
- Budget: $32,909,000 2022-2023 expenditures
- NCES District ID: 2612150

Students and staff
- Students: 1,823 (2024-2025)
- Teachers: 110.02 (on an FTE basis) (2024-2025)
- Staff: 271.05 FTE (2024-2025)
- Student–teacher ratio: 16.57 (2024-2025)

Other information
- Website: www.dowagiacschools.org

Dowagiac Union Schools is a public school district in southwest Michigan. In Cass County, it serves Dowagiac and parts of the townships of LaGrange, Pokagon, Silver Creek, and Wayne. It also serves parts of Keeler Township in Van Buren County and Pipestone Township in Berrien County.

== History ==
A school was built in Dowagiac around 1858, but it burned down three years later. In 1861, a Union School was built at the corner of Main and Parsonage Streets.

At the current site of Justus Gage Elementary, a ward school (or elementary school) was built in 1864. It was replaced in 1902 by a new Dowagiac High School.

A new high school was built in 1925 at the site of the Union School, 520 Main Street. It opened in 1927. The building featured relief sculptures on the cornice and the inscription ENTER TO LEARN LEAVE TO SERVE.

The current Dowagiac Union High School partially opened in fall 1961, and the remainder of the building was completed and occupied in January 1962. Then-candidate for Michigan governor George W. Romney gave the high school's dedication speech on March 27, 1962. The former high school became Central Junior High School.

On September 15, 1963, a parachutist was injured when he landed on the roof of the high school.

Central Junior High, which became Central Middle School, closed in 2005 and the new Dowagiac Middle School opened in fall 2005. The middle school includes an 870-seat auditorium.

== Schools ==
Schools in Dowagiac Union School District
School	Address	Notes
Dowagiac Union High School	701 W Prairie Ronde, Dowagiac	Grades 9-12. Opened 1961.
Dowagiac Middle School	57072 Riverside Drive, Dowagiac	Grades 6-8. Opened 2005.
Justus Gage Elementary	301 Oak Street, Dowagiac	Grades PreK-5
Kincheloe Elementary	25121 Gage Street, Dowagiac	Grades K-5
Patrick Hamilton Elementary	614 Spruce Street, Dowagiac	Grades K-5
Sister Lakes Elementary	68079 M-152, Benton Harbor	Grades K-5
Pathfinders Alternative & Adult Education	501 N Paul Street, Dowagiac	Alternative high school and adult education
