= M-62 (Michigan highway) =

State highway in Cass and Berrien counties in Michigan, United States

M-62
- M-62 highlighted in red

Route information
- Maintained by MDOT
- Length: 28.329 mi (45.591 km)
- Existed: c. 1924–present

Major junctions
- South end: SR 23 near Granger, Indiana
- US 12 at Edwardsburg; M-60 at Cassopolis; M-51 at Dowagiac
- West end: M-140 near Eau Claire

Location
- Country: United States
- State: Michigan
- Counties: Cass, Berrien

Highway system
- Michigan State Trunkline Highway System; Interstate; US; State; Byways
← M-61	→ M-63

M-62 is an arc-shaped state trunkline highway in the southwestern part of the US state of Michigan. The highway runs from the Indiana state line north and west to M-140 in Eau Claire. In between, it serves the western Cass County communities of Dowagiac and Cassopolis. The highway was formed in the 1920s, originally as a north–south route. It was later extended, taking the current arc-shaped routing. A short truncation in the 1950s produced the current routing, which has remained unchanged since. In total, M-62 runs about 28 1/3 miles (45.6 km) in the two counties.

== Route description ==
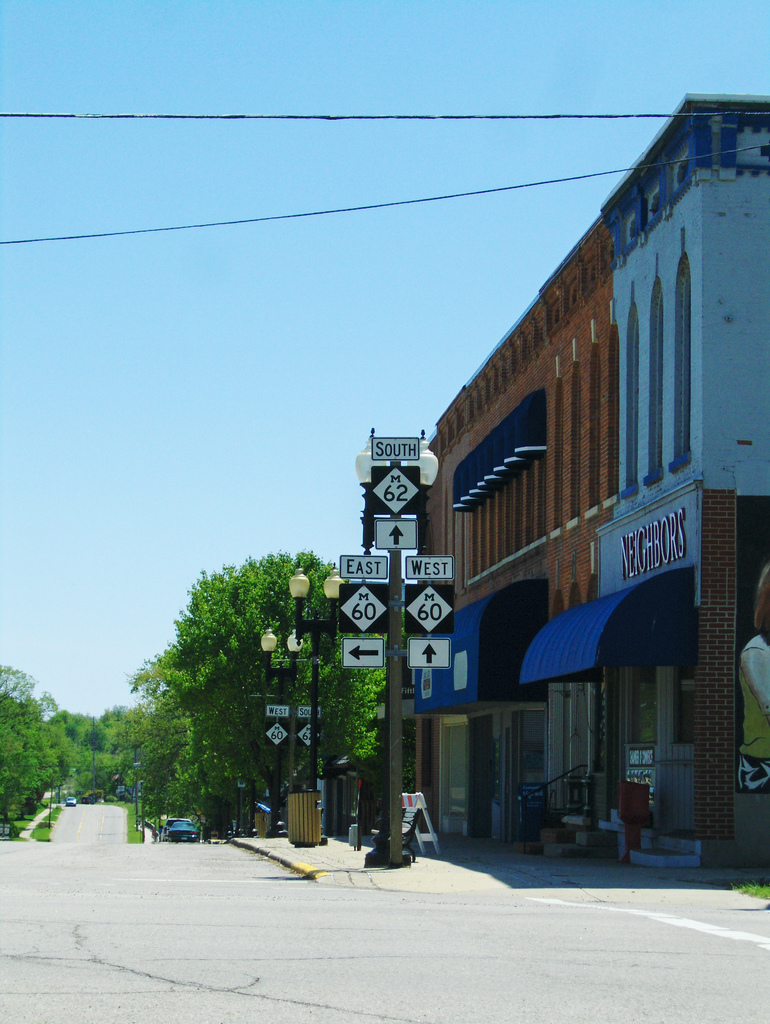
The intersection of M-60 and M-62 in Cassopolis

M-62 follows a roughly "question mark"-shaped routing in southwestern Michigan. It starts at the Indiana state line south of Edwardsburg in Cass County's Ontwa Township north of Granger, Indiana. The trunkline connects with State Road 23 and runs north through farmland to Edwardsburg, intersecting US Highway 12 (US 12) in town. M-62 turns northeasterly running out of town parallel to a rail line up to Cassopolis. The trunkline crosses the rail line and runs concurrently with M-60 through Cassopolis. The two highways pass Stone Lake on the way into downtown. M-62 continues north after leaving M-60, where the change in signposting from north–south to east–west occurs, then curves west to leave town. It then continues through more farmland to La Grange, where it crosses the Dowagiac River at the mouth of La Grange Lake. It crosses the river a second time on the way northwest to Dowagiac.

The Michigan Department of Transportation (MDOT) tracks the traffic volumes along the roads it maintains. This is measured using a metric called average annual daily traffic, which is the number of vehicle per day that use a roadway segment for any average day of the year. In 2009, MDOT's survey calculated that 2,246 vehicles used the section of M-62 between Cassopolis, La Grange and Dowagiac. This was the lowest traffic count along the whole highway.

The third crossing of the Dowagiac is at the mouth of Mill Pond in eastern Dowagiac, where M-62 follows Division Street through downtown. This section of the highway had the highest traffic count with 9,088 vehicles in 2009. At Front Street, M-51 merges with M-62, and the two run concurrently to the west through town. M-62 continues westerly after M-51 separates and turns southwesterly near the Dowagiac Municipal Airport. The highway crosses into Berrien County south of Indian Lake and continues west through more scattered farms and woodland to a junction with M-140. At this intersection, M-140 turns west along the roadway, and M-62 ends. No section of M-62 has been listed on the National Highway System, a system of roads considered important to the country's defense, economy or mobility.

== History ==
M-62 was formed before 1924 along a portion of its current routing. The trunkline started at the Indiana state line and ran north through Edwardsburg and Cassopolis. The northern terminus was at M-40 (now M-51) in Dowagiac. The southern section was moved by the end of 1925 to follow a more direct routing between Edwardsburg and the state line. An extension in 1930 moved the northern terminus west into Berrien County, ending in Eau Claire. The final few miles of highway were transferred back in local control around 1957. Before the transfer, M-62 ran concurrently with M-140 west and continued into Eau Claire. After the transfer, M-62 ended at the eastern M-140 junction and the concurrency was removed.

== Major intersections ==
County	Location	mi	km	Destinations	Notes
Cass	Ontwa Township	0.000	0.000	SR 23 south – South Bend	Indiana state line
Cass	Edwardsburg	2.859	4.601	US 12 – Niles, Sturgis	
Cass	Cassopolis	11.220– 11.787	18.057– 18.969	M-60 – Niles, Three Rivers	M-62 is concurrent with M-60 through town
Cass	Dowagiac	20.137– 21.005	32.407– 33.804	M-51 – Niles, Paw Paw	M-62 is concurrent with M-51 through town
Berrien	Pipestone–Berrien township line	28.329	45.591	M-140 – Niles, South Haven	
1.000 mi = 1.609 km; 1.000 km = 0.621 mi: Concurrency terminus
