= Dowagiac River =

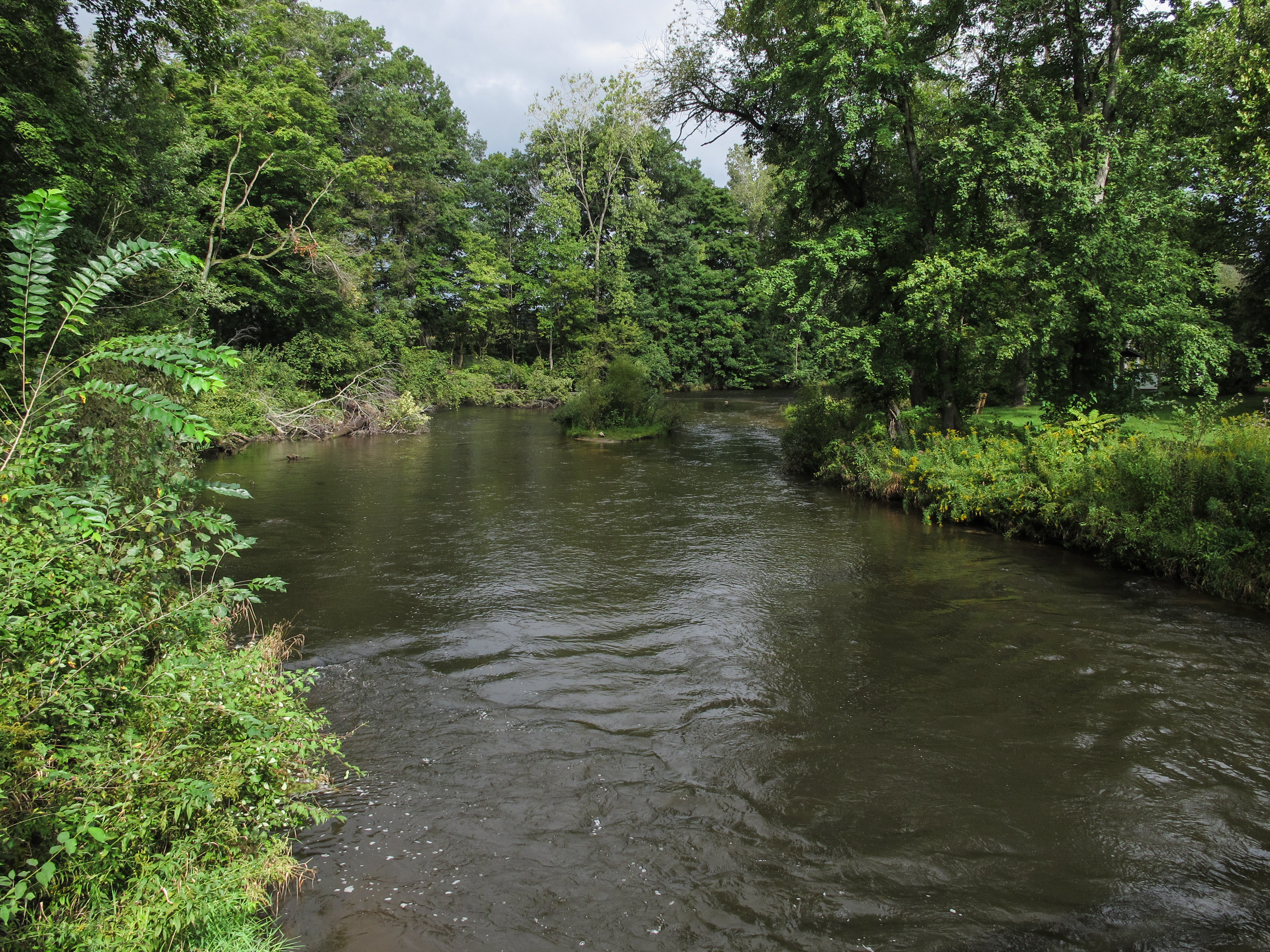
- The Dowagiac River in Pokagon Township

Location
- Country: United States
- State: Michigan
- Cities: Dowagiac, Niles

Physical characteristics
- Source: Confluence of Dowagiac Drain and Lake of the Woods Drain
  - location: Berrien County, Michigan
  - coordinates: 42°04′39″N 086°01′23″W
  - elevation: 745 ft (227 m)
- Mouth: St. Joseph River
  - coordinates: 41°50′43″N 086°15′58″W
  - elevation: 636 ft (194 m)

Basin features
- Tributaries
  - left: Dowagiac Creek, Peavine Creek (Dowagiac River), Pokagon Creek, McKinzie Creek
  - right: Osborn Creek, Silver Creek

The Dowagiac River (/dəˈwɑːʒæk/ də-WAH-zhak) is a southwesterly flowing 30.9-mile-long (49.7 km) stream in the Lower Peninsula of the U.S. state of Michigan. It is a tributary to the St. Joseph River which flows, in turn, into eastern Lake Michigan.

== Habitat and Ecology ==
The Dowagiac River is unusual in southern Michigan, being similar in temperature and flow to northern trout streams such as the Au Sable River. High groundwater contributions along much of the Dowagiac River’s length provide cold temperatures and steady base flow throughout the summer season. In July river temperatures range in the middle 60's which is ideal for non-native brown trout (Salmo trutta). There are two dams in the watershed: Lower Mill Pond Dam on Dowagiac Creek upstream from the city of Dowagiac and Barron Lake Road Dam on McKinzie Creek.

Pucker Street Dam was the only dam on the Dowagiac River mainstem, located 3 miles (4.8 km) upstream from the confluence with the St. Joseph River. It was an impassable barrier to the upstream migration of non-native steelhead trout (Oncorhynchus mykiss), Chinook salmon (Oncorhynchus tshawytscha), coho salmon (Oncorhychus kisutch), brown trout, and native smallmouth bass (Micropterus dolomieu), white suckers (Catostomus commersonii)), and walleye (Sander vitreus) to more than 159 miles (256 km) of Dowagiac River and its tributaries. The dam was ordered repaired or removed by the Michigan Department of Environmental Quality (MDEQ) for safety reasons in 2013. In fact, the St. Joseph River Watershed Fish Migration Barrier Inventory in 2011 ranked the Pucker Street Dam as the highest priority dam for removal in the entire St. Joseph River watershed for conservation and restoration purposes. Removal of the dam began in September 2019 and the project is expected to continue through 2021.

== Watershed and Course ==
The Dowagiac River watershed drains 287 square miles (740 km^{2}). The Dowagiac River mainstem is formed by the confluence of the Dowagiac Drain and the Lake of the Woods Drain near the southern edge of Hamilton Township, becoming the Dowagiac River before entering Wayne Township in Cass County.

The headwaters begin as the Dowagiac Drain which rises a few miles east of Decatur in central Decatur Township in southern Van Buren County, Michigan. Flowing west and south, it is joined first by Red Run and then by Lake of the Woods Drain to form the Dowagiac River. The river is joined from the north first by Osborn Drain and then Silver Creek. North of the city of Dowagiac, the river passes through the Dowagiac Swamp. Just west of Dowagiac, the river is joined by its principal tributary, Dowagiac Creek, at 41°58′55″N 86°10′16″W. Dowagiac Creek rises in Volinia Township at 42°02′25″N 85°54′46″W from the outflow of a series of lakes including Saddlebag Lake, Fish Lake, Finch Lake and Bunker Lake. The creek flows southwest into LaGrange Lake in LaGrange Township. From the outflow of the lake, it continues west and north through the city of Dowagiac before joining the Dowagiac River. As the river continues south-southwest it is joined by Peavine Creek, Pokagon Creek, and McKinzie Creek. It enters Berrien County, where it flows into the St. Joseph River just north of Niles at 41°50′43″N 86°15′58″W.

The watershed includes all or portions of the following townships:

In the southern tier of Van Buren County

- Porter Township
- Decatur Township
- Hamilton Township
- Keeler Township

In Cass County

- Marcellus Township
- Volinia Township
- Wayne Township
- Silver Creek Township
- Penn Township (the western edge around section 7)
- Lagrange Township
- Pokagon Township
- Howard Township

In Berrien County

- Niles Township

Tributaries of the Dowagiac River from the mouth

- McKinzie Creek
- Pokagon Creek
- Peavine Creek
- Dowagiac Creek
  - LaGrange Lake
  - Kelsey Lake
  - Bunker Lake
  - Finch Lake
  - Fish Lake
  - Saddlebag Lake
- Silver Creek
- Osburn Drain
- Lake of the Woods Drain
- Red Run
- Dowagiac Drain

== See also ==
- St. Joseph River
