= M-140 (Michigan highway) =

State highway in Berrien and Van Buren counties in Michigan, United States

M-140
- M-140 highlighted in red

Route information
- Maintained by MDOT
- Length: 37.205 mi (59.876 km)
- Existed: c. 1931–present

Major junctions
- South end: M-139 in Niles
- M-62 near Eau Claire; I-94 near Watervliet
- North end: I-196 / US 31 / LMCT / BL I-196 at South Haven

Location
- Country: United States
- State: Michigan
- Counties: Berrien, Van Buren

Highway system
- Michigan State Trunkline Highway System; Interstate; US; State; Byways
| ← M-139 | → US 141 |

M-140 is a north–south state trunkline highway in Berrien and Van Buren counties of the US state of Michigan. The highway starts in the Niles area at M-139 and runs north through Watervliet to South Haven, ending at Interstate 196/US Highway 31 (I-196/US 31). In between, it runs through farm fields and past lakes in the southwestern part of the Lower Peninsula. The trunkline is used, on average, by between 1,500 and 10,200 vehicles.

The state designated M-140 in the early 1930s over a previous alignment of US 31 when that highway rerouted through the area. M-140 was extended from Watervliet to Niles a few years later. Changes were made to the routing of the trunkline in the 1950s and 1960s. The last change was made in 1972, resulting in the modern course for the highway.

== Route description ==
M-140 starts at an intersection with M-139 near the St. Joseph River north of Niles and runs due north through farm fields. The trunkline jogs to the west near Steinbauer Lake before returning to the northerly course. There is another westerly jog along Pokagon Road around Riggins Lake. M-140 turns back northward and runs through the community of Berrien Center. Near Eau Claire, the highway turns bends along Maple Grove Road for about 1,000 feet (300 m) before going north on Watervliet Road. East of town, the trunkline follows Main Street eastward toward the Berrien–Cass county line. M-140 intersects the northern terminus of M-62 and curves north.

In northern Berrien County, M-140 follows Watervliet Road to an interchange with Interstate 94 (I-94). The highway continues northward along Main Street into Watervliet, running through the middle of town and intersecting Red Arrow Highway, the former US 12. North of downtown, the trunkline curves through residential neighborhoods to the northeast around the east end of Paw Paw Lake. M-140 crosses into western Van Buren County about five miles (8.0 km) north of Watervliet. The highway crosses, and parallels, the Van Buren Trail in Covert. In South Haven Township, M-140 connects the South Haven Area Regional Airport with the I-196/US 31 freeway; north of this interchange, the highway continues as Business Loop I-196.

M-140 is maintained by the Michigan Department of Transportation (MDOT) like other state highways in Michigan. MDOT's surveys in 2010 showed that the highest traffic levels along M-140 were the 10,176 vehicles daily near in Watervliet; the lowest count was 1,536 vehicles per day along Pokagon Road, on average. All of M-140 is a two-lane, undivided highway, except sections in cities like Watervliet which may have up to four lanes. No section of the trunkline has not been listed on the National Highway System, a network of roads important to the country's economy, defense, and mobility.

== History ==
The State Trunkline Highway System was created on May 13, 1913, by an act of the Michigan Legislature; at the time, one of the system's divisions corresponded to the initial segment of M-140. Division 5 followed a course from Niles northward to Mackinaw City that encompassed the highway between Watervliet and South Haven. In 1919, the Michigan State Highway Department (MSHD) (Note: The Michigan State Highway Department was reorganized into the Michigan Department of State Highways and Transportation on August 23, 1973. The name was shortened to its current form in 1978.) signposted the highway system for the first time, and the future M-140 corridor was assigned to part of the original M-11. On November 11, 1926, M-11 was redesignated as part of US 31 in the state.

In 1931, the state transferred US 31 to a new routing between the St. Joseph and South Haven areas; in the process, the former route of US 31 between Watervliet and South Haven was redesignated as M-140. The highway was extended southward from Watervliet to the Niles area in late 1934 due to heavy traffic on that section. The concurrency between M-62 and M-140 was eliminated around the end of 1957 when the former highway was truncated to terminate east of Eau Claire instead of continuing west into town. In 1958, the route north of Watervliet to the county line was realigned, smoothing several sharp curves.

The construction of the I-196/US 31 freeway around the South Haven area impacted the northern terminus of M-140 in the 1960s. When it opened in 1963, BL I-196 was shown on maps as continuing north along M-140 into town to a junction with M-43. In 1972, the business loop was rerouted, and M-140 was truncated to end at the freeway interchange south of town.

== Major intersections ==
| County | Location | mi | km | Destinations | Notes |
|---|---|---|---|---|---|
| Berrien | Niles Township | 0.000 | 0.000 | M-139 (Old US 31/Front Street) | |
| Berrien | Berrien–Pipestone township line | 10.320 | 16.608 | M-62 east – Dowagiac | |
| Berrien | Watervliet Township | 23.678– 23.698 | 38.106– 38.138 | I-94 – Detroit, Chicago | Exit 41 on I-94 |
| Van Buren | South Haven Township | 37.205 | 59.876 | I-196 / US 31 / LMCT south – Benton Harbor, Holland BL I-196 north / LMCT north | Exit 18 on I-196/US 31; roadway continues as BL I-196 |
1.000 mi = 1.609 km; 1.000 km = 0.621 mi
