= Adamsville, Michigan =

- Unincorporated community
- Location within the state of Michigan Adamsville (the United States)
- Coordinates: 41°47′07″N 85°59′38″W
- Country: United States
- State: Michigan
- County: Cass
- Township: Ontwa
- Elevation: 820 ft (250 m)
- Time zone: UTC−5 (Eastern (EST))
  - Summer (DST): UTC−4 (EDT)
- ZIP code(s): 49112
- Area code: 269
- GNIS feature ID: 619836

Adamsville is an unincorporated community in Ontwa Township within Cass County in the U.S. state of Michigan.

== History ==
Originally named Adamsport, the town was established in 1832. In 1838 it merged with Sage's Mill, a populated place on the other side of a creek.
