= Mason Township, Cass County, Michigan =

Mason Township, Michigan
- Civil township
- logo

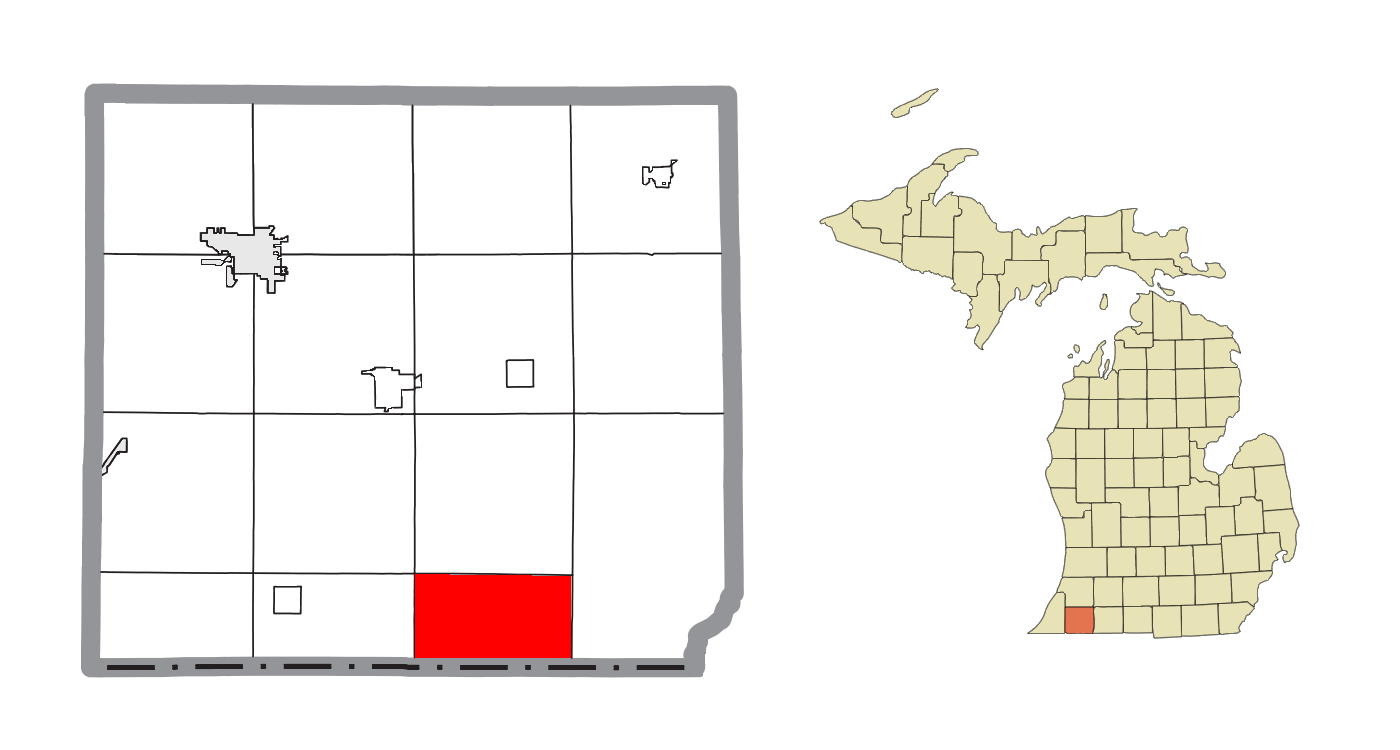
- Location within Cass County

- Location within the state of Michigan Mason Township (the United States)
- Coordinates: 41°47′06″N 85°56′35″W
- Country: United States
- State: Michigan
- County: Cass

Area
  - Total: 20.5 sq mi (53.2 km^{2})
  - Land: 20.2 sq mi (52.4 km^{2})
  - Water: 0.31 sq mi (0.8 km^{2})
- Elevation: 846 ft (258 m)

Population (2020)
  - Total: 2,841
  - Density: 140/sq mi (54.2/km^{2})
- Time zone: UTC-5 (Eastern (EST))
  - Summer (DST): UTC-4 (EDT)
- ZIP code(s): 49031, 49061, 49112, 49130
- Area code: 269
- FIPS code: 26-52140
- GNIS feature ID: 1626705
- Website: Official website

Mason Township is a civil township of Cass County in the U.S. state of Michigan. The population was 2,841 at the 2020 census.

== Geography ==
Mason Township is located in southern Cass County, along the Indiana state line. The unincorporated community of Kessington is in the southeastern part of the township, and Allenton is in the southwest. The community of Simonton Lake, Indiana, is directly to the south.

According to the United States Census Bureau, the township has a total area of 20.5 square miles (53.2 km^{2}), of which 20.2 square miles (52.4 km^{2}) is land and 0.31 square miles (0.8 km^{2}), or 1.45%, is water.

== History ==
Cass County had been originally organized by an act of the Michigan Territorial Council on November 4, 1829, as four townships while Lewis Cass was the territorial governor. Mason was included in Ontwa Township at the end of 1833, and at the start of 1834 Mason Township was formed into the same land area that it is today, which is less than the standard 36 square miles (93 km^{2}) of most townships.

== Demographics ==
Historical population
Census	Pop.	Note	%±
2000	2,514		—
2010	2,945		17.1%
2020	2,841		−3.5%

As of the census of 2000, there were 2,514 people, 953 households, and 732 families residing in the township. The population density was 124.0 inhabitants per square mile (47.9/km^{2}). There were 1,021 housing units at an average density of 50.4 per square mile (19.5/km^{2}). The racial makeup of the township was 96.94% White, 0.24% African American, 0.52% Native American, 0.72% Asian, 0.32% from other races, and 1.27% from two or more races. Hispanic or Latino of any race were 1.67% of the population.

There were 953 households, out of which 32.6% had children under the age of 18 living with them, 60.5% were married couples living together, 10.8% had a female householder with no husband present, and 23.1% were non-families. 16.7% of all households were made up of individuals, and 5.9% had someone living alone who was 65 years of age or older. The average household size was 2.64 and the average family size was 2.94.

In the township the population was spread out, with 25.3% under the age of 18, 7.8% from 18 to 24, 28.9% from 25 to 44, 26.8% from 45 to 64, and 11.2% who were 65 years of age or older. The median age was 38 years. For every 100 females, there were 100.5 males. For every 100 females age 18 and over, there were 97.8 males.

The median income for a household in the township was $41,902, and the median income for a family was $46,620. Males had a median income of $35,827 versus $22,404 for females. The per capita income for the township was $19,497. About 4.0% of families and 6.9% of the population were below the poverty line, including 6.3% of those under age 18 and 8.6% of those age 65 or over.
