= Smith's Chapel =

Historic building in Cass County, Michigan, US

- U.S. National Register of Historic Places
- Michigan State Historic Site
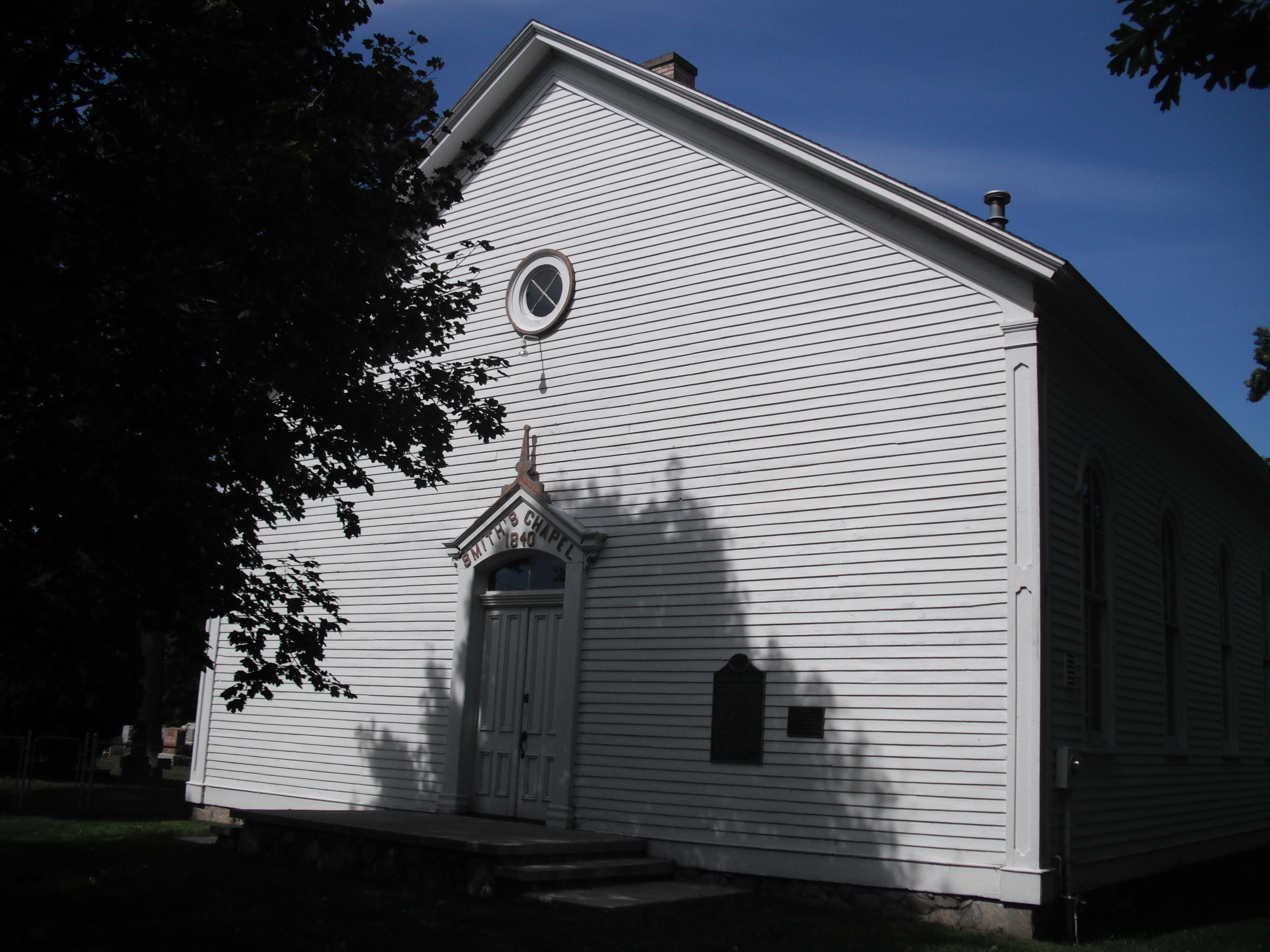

- Location within Michigan Location within the United States
- Interactive map
- Location: 29858 Redfield Rd, Niles, Michigan
- Coordinates: 41°46′7″N 86°8′44″W
- Area: 5.5 acres (2.2 ha)
- Built: 1840
- Built by: James Taylor, W. S. Beswick
- Architectural style: Late Victorian
- NRHP reference No.: 87002224

Significant dates
- Added to NRHP: December 31, 1987
- Designated MSHS: April 24, 1979

Smith's Chapel, also known as Smith Chapel, is a historic chapel located at 29858 Redfield Road in Milton Township, Cass County, Michigan, near Niles. It was designated a Michigan State Historic Site in 1979 and listed on the National Register of Historic Places in 1987. The chapel is the oldest known church building in Cass County, and probably the oldest in southwest Michigan.

== History ==
Cannon Smith, the son of George and Sophia Cannon Smith, was born in 1782. He settled in this location in 1829 after moving from his previous home in Delaware. In 1831, traveling Methodist circuit preachers established classes at Smith's home. This led to the organization of the first Methodist church in Milton Township in 1839.

In 1840, the congregation hired James Taylor, a carpenter and joiner, to construct this church building at a cost of $1200. Cannon Smith donated the land, and contributed substantially toward the construction of the church. Because of these contributions, the church was named "Smith's Chapel".

The surrounding cemetery grounds were purchased in 1872. In 1879, contractor W. S. Beswick was hired to remodel the church. The church was used regularly until 1967, and in 1972 Milton Township purchased the structure. In 2008, the chapel underwent substantial restoration. In 2013, the township owned the chapel, with the surrounding cemetery grounds owned by a non-profit organization, Smith Chapel Cemetery Inc. The building was available for rental as a wedding and funeral chapel. In November 2018 the township sold the chapel and grounds to private citizens, who subsequently made restorations.

== Description ==
Smith's Chapel is a single-story wood frame post-and-beam chapel with clapboard siding and a gable roof on a fieldstone foundation. It measures 40 by 48 feet (12 m × 15 m), with a hallway 8 feet (2.4 m) wide across the front, and a 40-by-40-foot (12 m × 12 m) sanctuary. A gabled entrance is on one end with an oculus above. The sides contain round-arch windows with wooden hood molds. Attached to rear of the chapel is a gable-roof, clapboard-sided privy. Cemetery grounds are located near the chapel, containing primarily stone (and one zinc) monuments.
