= George Newton House =

Historic house in Michigan, United States

- U.S. National Register of Historic Places
- Michigan State Historic Site
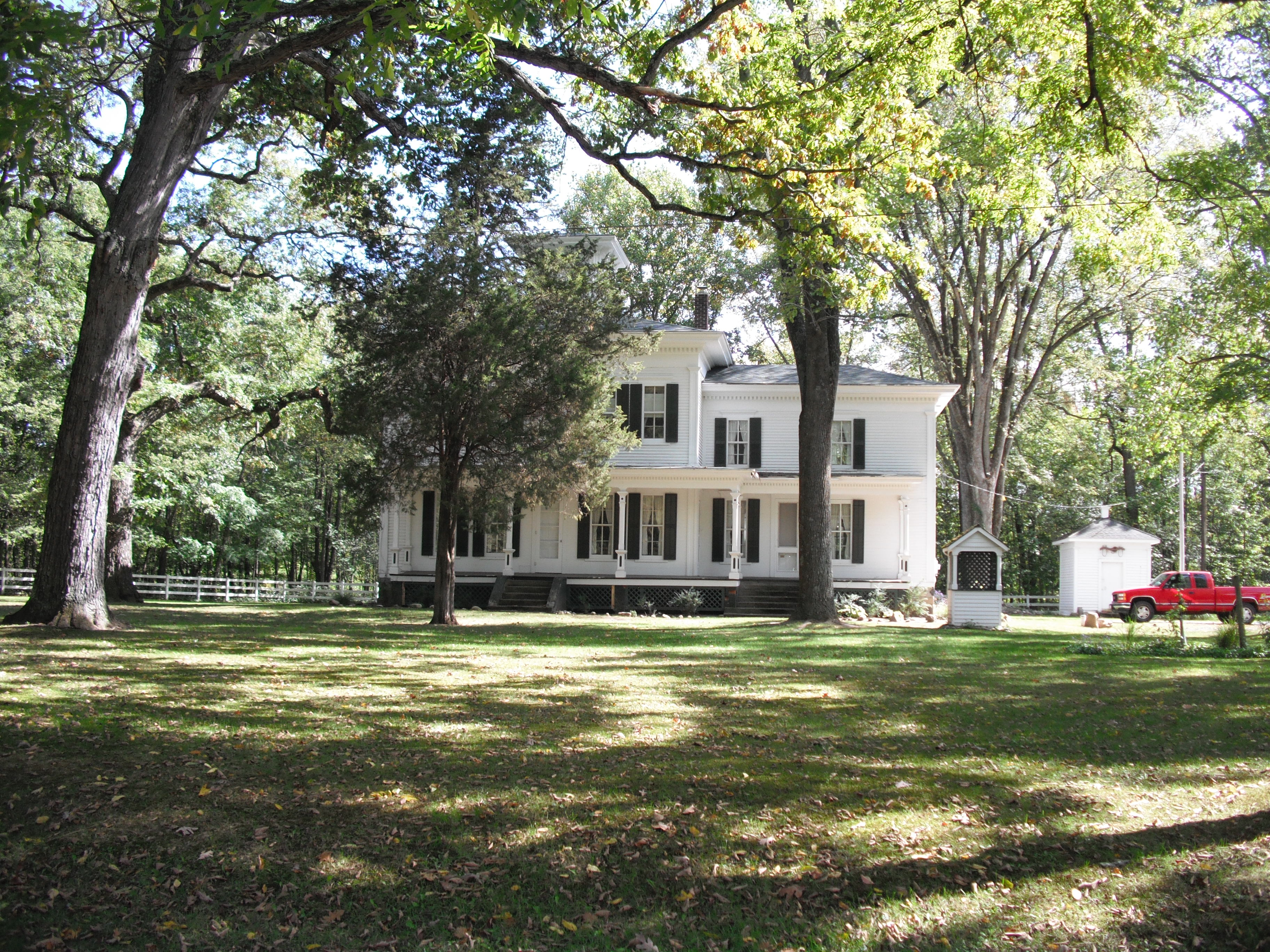

- Location within Michigan Location within the United States
- Interactive map
- Nearest city: Marcellus, Michigan
- Coordinates: 42°0′44″N 85°58′5″W
- Area: 4 acres (1.6 ha)
- Built: 1865
- Architect: Christian G. Haefner
- Architectural style: Italianate
- NRHP reference No.: 82002830

Significant dates
- Added to NRHP: May 12, 1982
- Designated MSHS: November 14, 1974

The George Newton House is a private house located at 20689 Marcellus Highway near Marcellus, Michigan. It was designated a Michigan State Historic Site in 1974 and listed on the National Register of Historic Places in 1982. It is significant as the home of prominent civic leader George Newton, the son of Cass County pioneer Col. James Newton.

== History ==
James Newton was born in England in 1777, and emigrated as a boy to the United States. His family settled near Morristown, New Jersey; later Newton moved on to Pennsylvania, and then, in 1804, Ohio. He commanded a regiment of Ohio militia, earning the rank of Colonel, and served in the War of 1812, commanding at times both Fort Black and Fort Meigs.

James Newton's son George Newton was born in 1810 in Preble County, Ohio in 1810. Both George and his father James moved to Cass County in 1830 and settled down to farm. James Newton served as a member of the 1835 Michigan Constitutional Convention, and as a member of the Michigan House in 1837–38 and 1838–39. James Newton died in 1844.

George Newton married Esther Green in 1837; the couple had two children. He followed his father into public service, and was elected to multiple local offices. In addition, he served as a member of the Michigan House in 1858–59. In 1865, Newton commissioned architect Christian G. Haefner to design this house. George Newton died in 1883.

In 1931, Fred Russ purchased the house and the surrounding 580 acre parcel of timberland. In 1942, he gifted the land to Michigan State University. The University Forestry School used it as the Fred Russ Experimental Forest. The house was restored by the Cass County Historical Commission. As of 2013, the house operated as a public museum, the Newton House Museum.

== Description ==
The George Newton House is significant as an unusually well-preserved example of an Italianate country villa. It is a two-story house clad with clapboard and a hip roof topped with a belvedere. A veranda runs across the front of the house and a hip roof ell projecting to one side. Overhanging eaves and a classical cornice run under the roof.
