= Newberg Township, Michigan =

- Civil township
- logo

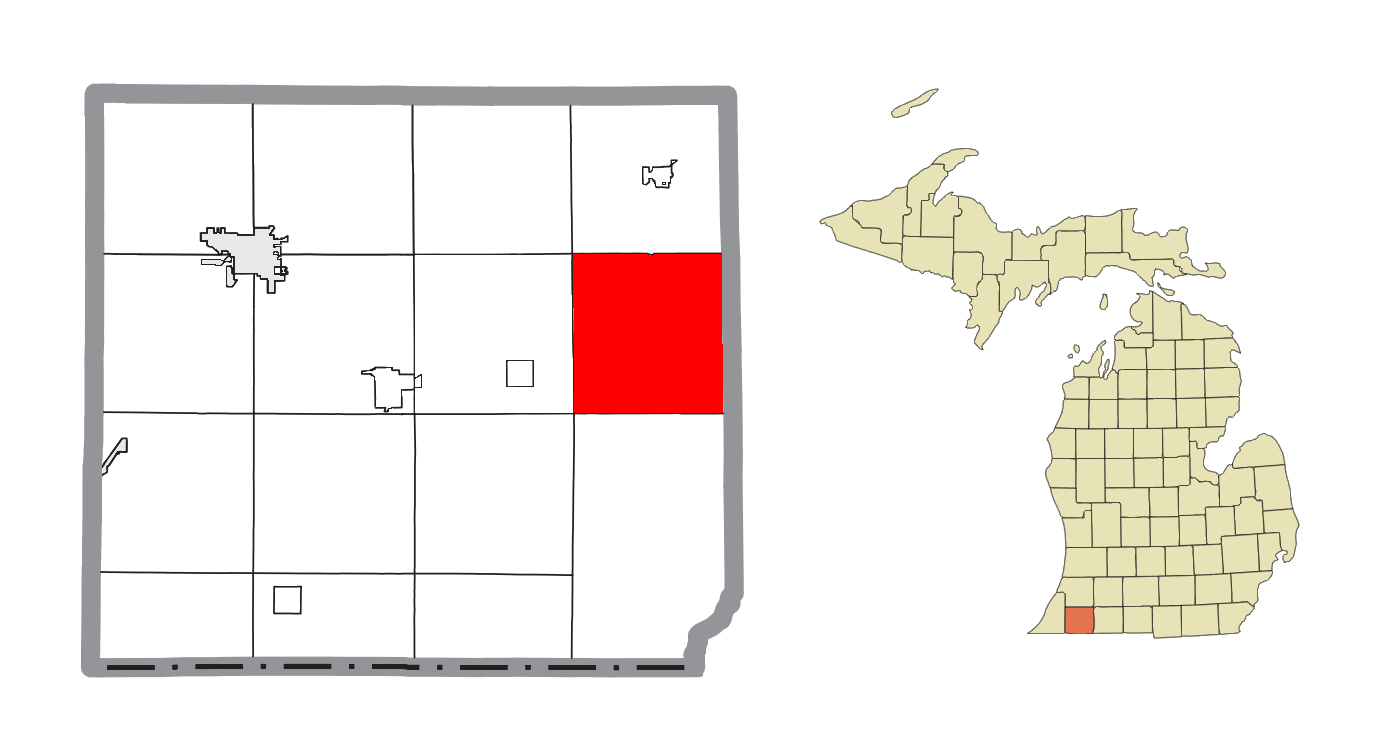
- Location within Cass County

- Location within the state of Michigan Newberg Township (the United States)
- Coordinates: 41°55′59″N 85°48′33″W
- Country: United States
- State: Michigan
- County: Cass

Area
  - Total: 35.5 sq mi (92.0 km^{2})
  - Land: 34.6 sq mi (89.5 km^{2})
  - Water: 0.97 sq mi (2.5 km^{2})
- Elevation: 988 ft (301 m)

Population (2020)
  - Total: 1,602
  - Density: 46.4/sq mi (17.9/km^{2})
- Time zone: UTC-5 (Eastern (EST))
  - Summer (DST): UTC-4 (EDT)
- ZIP code(s): 49061, 49067, 49095
- Area code: 269
- FIPS code: 26-57120
- GNIS feature ID: 1626797
- Website: Official website

Newberg Township is a civil township of Cass County in the U.S. state of Michigan. The population was 1,602 at the 2020 census.

== Communities ==
- Corey is an unincorporated community on M-60 near the eastern boundary with Fabius Township in St. Joseph County at 41°54′10″N 85°45′39″W. Corey was platted by Amanda Weatherwax in 1872. It was named for Corey Lake approximately 1.5 miles (2.4 km) to the northeast in St. Joseph County. Corey Lake had been named for Joshua B. Corey who had settled there circa 1840. A post office opened May 20, 1872, with Hazen W. Brown as its first postmaster. The post office closed on November 15, 1930. A station on the Michigan Central Railroad called "Corey's Station" opened in 1871.
- Dyer was an unincorporated community centered on a railroad station opened in 1871.
- Jones is an unincorporated community at the intersection of M-40 and M-60 at 41°54′09″N 85°47′58″W approximately 11 miles (18 km) east of Cassopolis. The first settlers were John Bair in 1831, who settled on Bair Lake, and Daniel Driskel in 1833, who settled on Driskels Lake which was named for Daniel Driskel. The first business structure was built by H. Meskell in 1870 on land owned by William D. Jones. Jones platted the community in 1875. A post office named "Newberg" opened on August 4, 1837. The name changed to "Newburgh" on December 24, 1861, and to "Jones" on December 19, 1881. E.H. Jones, the son of William, was its first postmaster. The Jones post office with ZIP code 49061 continues to serve large portions of Newberg Township and Porter Township along with a small area of southeast Calvin Township.

== Geography ==
According to the United States Census Bureau, the township has a total area of 35.5 square miles (92.0 km^{2}), of which 34.6 square miles (89.5 km^{2}) is land and 0.97 square miles (2.5 km^{2}), or 2.71%, is water.

== Demographics ==
Historical population
| Census | Pop. | Note | %± |
|---|---|---|---|
| 2000 | 1,703 | | — |
| 2010 | 1,632 | | −4.2% |
| 2020 | 1,602 | | −1.8% |

As of the census of 2000, there were 1,703 people, 648 households, and 458 families residing in the township. The population density was 49.2 inhabitants per square mile (19.0/km^{2}). There were 781 housing units at an average density of 22.6 per square mile (8.7/km^{2}). The racial makeup of the township was 94.66% White, 1.94% African American, 0.29% Native American, 0.94% Asian, 0.35% from other races, and 1.82% from two or more races. Hispanic or Latino of any race were 1.29% of the population.

There were 648 households, out of which 29.5% had children under the age of 18 living with them, 59.7% were married couples living together, 6.2% had a female householder with no husband present, and 29.2% were non-families. 23.3% of all households were made up of individuals, and 10.5% had someone living alone who was 65 years of age or older. The average household size was 2.63 and the average family size was 3.14.

In the township the population was spread out, with 26.1% under the age of 18, 7.2% from 18 to 24, 28.9% from 25 to 44, 24.9% from 45 to 64, and 12.9% who were 65 years of age or older. The median age was 38 years. For every 100 females, there were 108.4 males. For every 100 females age 18 and over, there were 107.6 males.

The median income for a household in the township was $43,466, and the median income for a family was $51,553. Males had a median income of $34,565 versus $24,917 for females. The per capita income for the township was $18,078. About 6.7% of families and 10.7% of the population were below the poverty line, including 14.9% of those under age 18 and 6.8% of those age 65 or over.

== See also ==
- Rainbow Farm
