= Howard Township, Michigan =

- Civil township
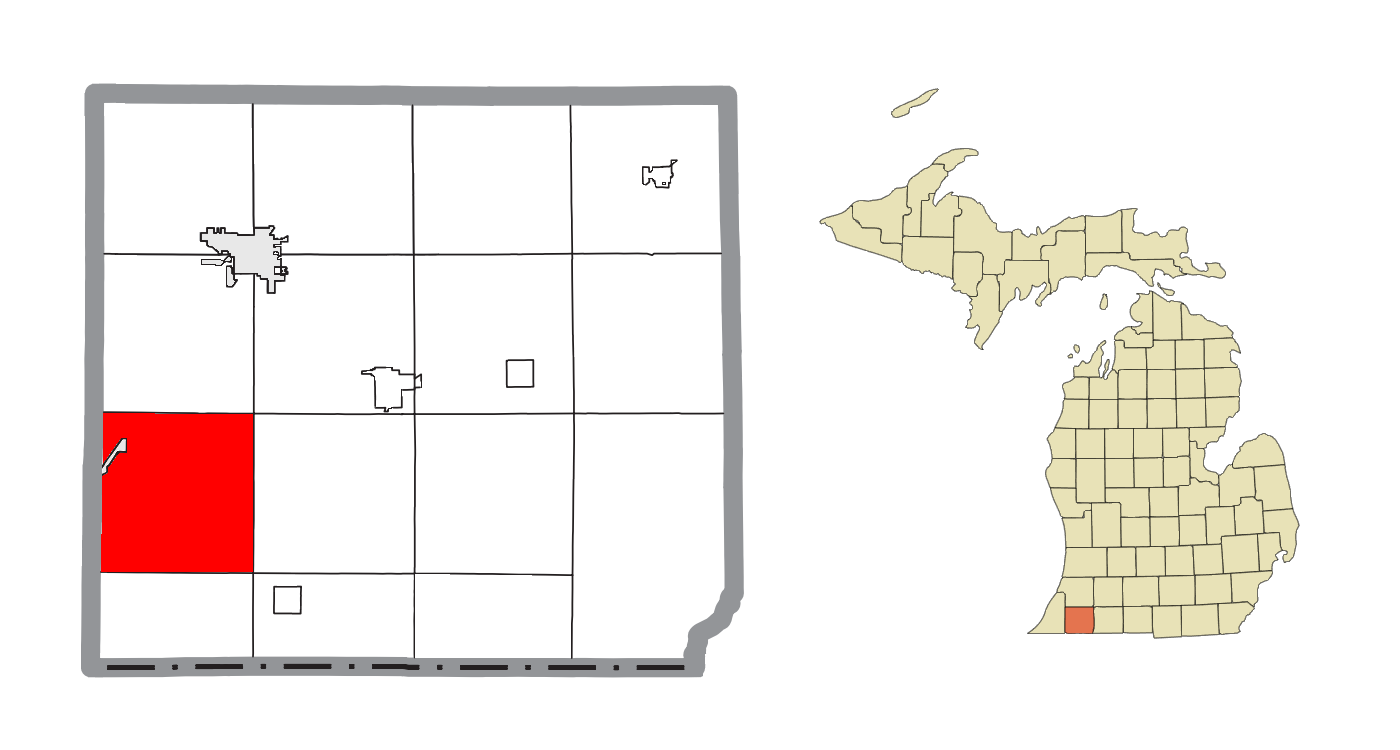
- Location within Cass County

- Location within the state of Michigan
- Coordinates: 41°51′06″N 86°10′41″W
- Country: United States
- State: Michigan
- County: Cass

Area
  - Total: 35.3 sq mi (91.4 km^{2})
  - Land: 34.5 sq mi (89.4 km^{2})
  - Water: 0.77 sq mi (2.0 km^{2})
- Elevation: 758 ft (231 m)

Population (2020)
  - Total: 6,275
  - Density: 182/sq mi (70.2/km^{2})
- Time zone: UTC-5 (Eastern (EST))
  - Summer (DST): UTC-4 (EDT)
- ZIP code(s): 49031, 49047, 49112, 49120
- Area code: 269
- FIPS code: 26-39480
- GNIS feature ID: 1626494
- Website: Official website

Howard Township is a civil township of Cass County in the U.S. state of Michigan. The population was 6,275 at the 2020 census.

== Geography ==
Howard Township is located in southwestern Cass County, bordered by Berrien County and the city of Niles to the west. According to the United States Census Bureau, the township has a total area of 35.3 square miles (91.4 km^{2}), of which 34.5 square miles (89.4 km^{2}) is land and 0.77 square miles (2.0 km^{2}), or 2.17%, is water. Barron Lake, near the center of the township, is the largest body of water.

== Demographics ==
Historical population
Census	Pop.	Note	%±
2000	6,309		—
2010	6,207		−1.6%
2020	6,275		1.1%

As of the census of 2000, there were 6,309 people, 2,472 households, and 1,846 families residing in the township. The population density was 181.1 inhabitants per square mile (69.9/km^{2}). There were 2,663 housing units at an average density of 76.5 per square mile (29.5/km^{2}). The racial makeup of the township was 93.87% White, 3.71% African American, 0.41% Native American, 0.17% Asian, 0.03% Pacific Islander, 0.59% from other races, and 1.22% from two or more races. Hispanic or Latino of any race were 0.97% of the population.

There were 2,472 households, out of which 28.9% had children under the age of 18 living with them, 62.1% were married couples living together, 8.3% had a female householder with no husband present, and 25.3% were non-families. 21.3% of all households were made up of individuals, and 8.5% had someone living alone who was 65 years of age or older. The average household size was 2.55 and the average family size was 2.92.

In the township the population was spread out, with 23.0% under the age of 18, 6.3% from 18 to 24, 27.4% from 25 to 44, 29.5% from 45 to 64, and 13.9% who were 65 years of age or older. The median age was 41 years. For every 100 females, there were 102.0 males. For every 100 females age 18 and over, there were 100.2 males.

The median income for a household in the township was $41,477, and the median income for a family was $47,382. Males had a median income of $36,098 versus $23,780 for females. The per capita income for the township was $19,429. About 4.6% of families and 7.0% of the population were below the poverty line, including 9.2% of those under age 18 and 7.3% of those age 65 or over.
