= Edwardsburg, Michigan =

- Village
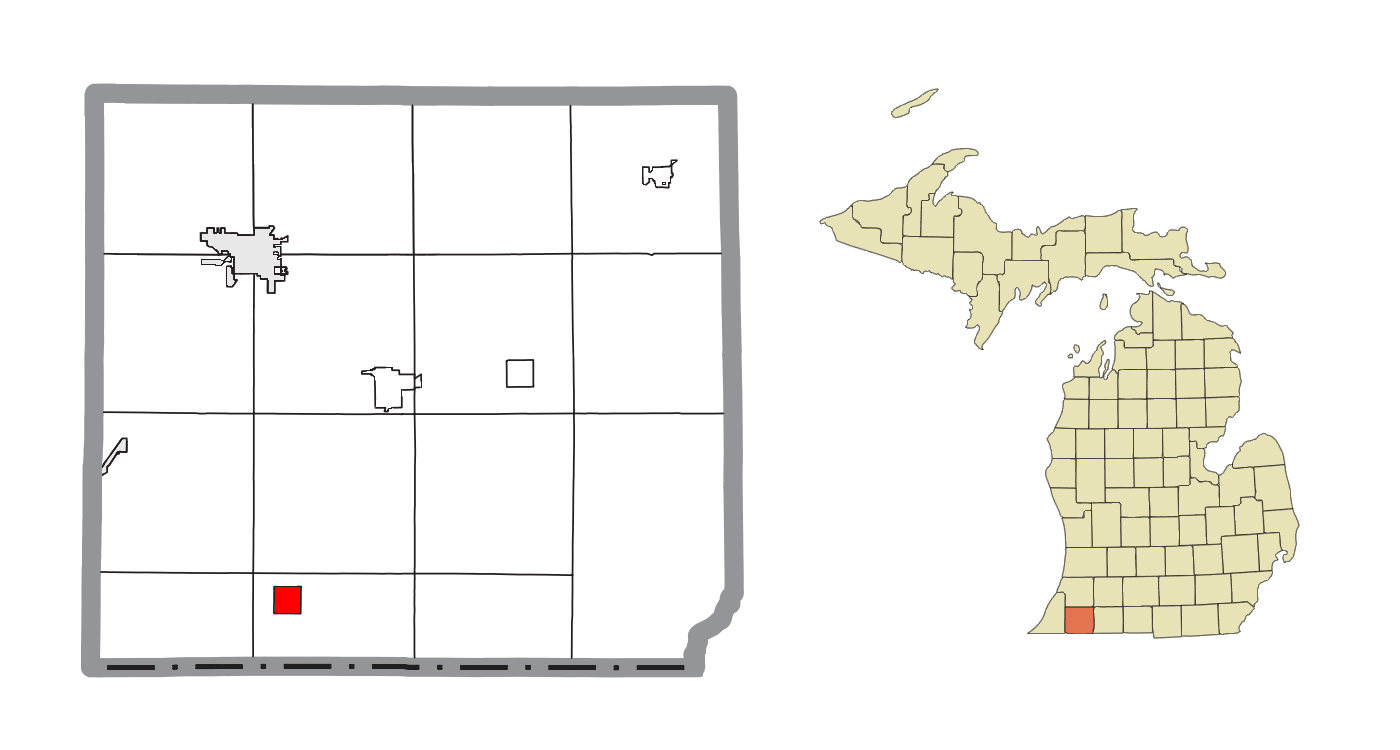
- Location within Cass County

- Location within the state of Michigan
- Coordinates: 41°47′48″N 86°05′01″W
- Country: United States
- State: Michigan
- County: Cass
- Township: Ontwa
- Settled: 1828
- Incorporated: 1911 (village)

Area
  - Total: 1.02 sq mi (2.63 km^{2})
  - Land: 0.92 sq mi (2.37 km^{2})
  - Water: 0.10 sq mi (0.27 km^{2})
- Elevation: 833 ft (254 m)

Population (2020)
  - Total: 1,304
  - Density: 1,426.4/sq mi (550.75/km^{2})
- Time zone: UTC-5 (Eastern (EST))
  - Summer (DST): UTC-4 (EDT)
- ZIP code(s): 49112, 49120
- Area code: 269
- FIPS code: 26-25040
- GNIS feature ID: 0625399
- Website: https://villageofedwardsburg.org/

Edwardsburg is a village within Ontwa Township in Cass County in the U.S. state of Michigan, northeast of South Bend, Indiana. The population was 1,304 at the 2020 census. It is part of the South Bend–Mishawaka, IN-MI, Metropolitan Statistical Area.

== History ==
Edwardsburg was established in 1828 in an area that had previously been known as Beardsley's Prairie. It was incorporated as a village in 1911, and is named after Abraham Edwards, a politician and early settler of the area.

== Geography ==
According to the United States Census Bureau, the village has a total area of 1.01 square miles (2.62 km^{2}), of which 0.91 square miles (2.36 km^{2}) is land and 0.10 square miles (0.26 km^{2}) is water.

== Demographics ==
Historical population
Census	Pop.	Note	%±
1850	252		—
1860	241		−4.4%
1870	297		23.2%
1880	500		68.4%
1890	404		−19.2%
1920	392		—
1930	388		−1.0%
1940	482		24.2%
1950	616		27.8%
1960	902		46.4%
1970	1,107		22.7%
1980	1,135		2.5%
1990	1,142		0.6%
2000	1,147		0.4%
2010	1,259		9.8%
2020	1,304		3.6%
U.S. Decennial Census

=== 2010 census ===
As of the census of 2010, there were 1,259 people, 517 households, and 332 families living in the village. The population density was 1,383.5 inhabitants per square mile (534.2/km^{2}). There were 569 housing units at an average density of 625.3 per square mile (241.4/km^{2}). The racial makeup of the village was 93.6% White, 1.5% African American, 0.8% Native American, 0.2% Asian, 0.3% Pacific Islander, 1.0% from other races, and 2.5% from two or more races. Hispanic or Latino of any race were 3.2% of the population.

There were 517 households, of which 35.2% had children under the age of 18 living with them, 38.9% were married couples living together, 18.4% had a female householder with no husband present, 7.0% had a male householder with no wife present, and 35.8% were non-families. 29.8% of all households were made up of individuals, and 10.6% had someone living alone who was 65 years of age or older. The average household size was 2.44 and the average family size was 2.98.

in the village was 36.1 years. 28.4% of residents were under the age of 18; 7.7% were between the ages of 18 and 24; 24.1% were from 25 to 44; 26.7% were from 45 to 64; and 13.2% were 65 years of age or older. The gender makeup of the village was 46.2% male and 53.8% female.

=== 2000 census ===
As of the census of 2000, there were 1,147 people, 507 households, and 319 families living in the village. The population density was 1,244.3 inhabitants per square mile (480.4/km^{2}). There were 531 housing units at an average density of 576.1 per square mile (222.4/km^{2}). The racial makeup of the village was 94.94% White, 0.17% Black or African American, 2.35% Native American, 0.17% Asian, 0.44% from other races, and 1.92% from two or more races. Hispanic or Latino of any race were 0.96% of the population.

There were 507 households, out of which 30.8% had children under the age of 18 living with them, 43.8% were married couples living together, 13.2% had a female householder with no husband present, and 36.9% were non-families. 31.4% of all households were made up of individuals, and 14.4% had someone living alone who was 65 years of age or older. The average household size was 2.26 and the average family size was 2.78.

In the village, the population was spread out, with 25.5% under the age of 18, 8.0% from 18 to 24, 31.3% from 25 to 44, 20.8% from 45 to 64, and 14.4% who were 65 years of age or older. The median age was 37 years. For every 100 females, there were 96.4 males. For every 100 females age 18 and over, there were 97.9 males.

The median income for a household in the village was $33,359, and the median income for a family was $37,132. Males had a median income of $32,969 versus $21,319 for females. The per capita income for the village was $18,842. About 8.7% of families and 11.3% of the population were below the poverty line, including 13.9% of those under age 18 and 8.6% of those age 65 or over.

== Transportation ==
Edwardsburg is situated at the crossroads of M-62, and US 12. The Canadian National railroad tracks run through the village. The village is serviced by the Niles Amtrak Station, and the South Bend International Airport, both of which are in the greater Michiana area. The Indiana Toll Road (I-80/90), runs East-West three miles (5 km) south of the village.

== Notable people ==
- Becky Breisch - track and field athlete
- Mark Kaminsky - professor and tourist detained by Soviet Union in 1960
- Megan and Liz - musicians
- Ruby Soho - professional wrestler
- Diane Seuss - poet
