= LaGrange Township, Michigan =

- Civil township
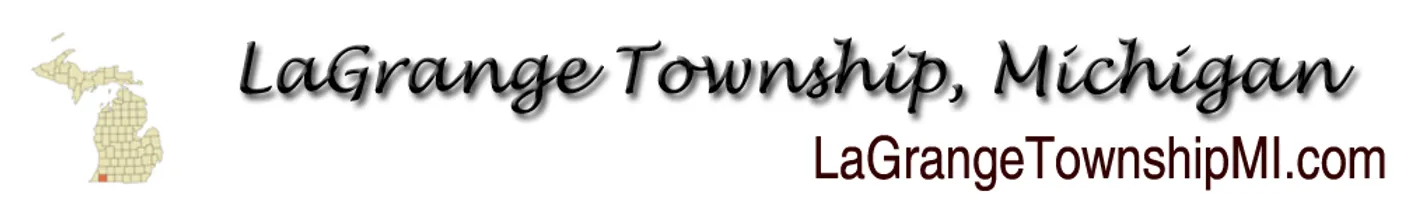
- Logo

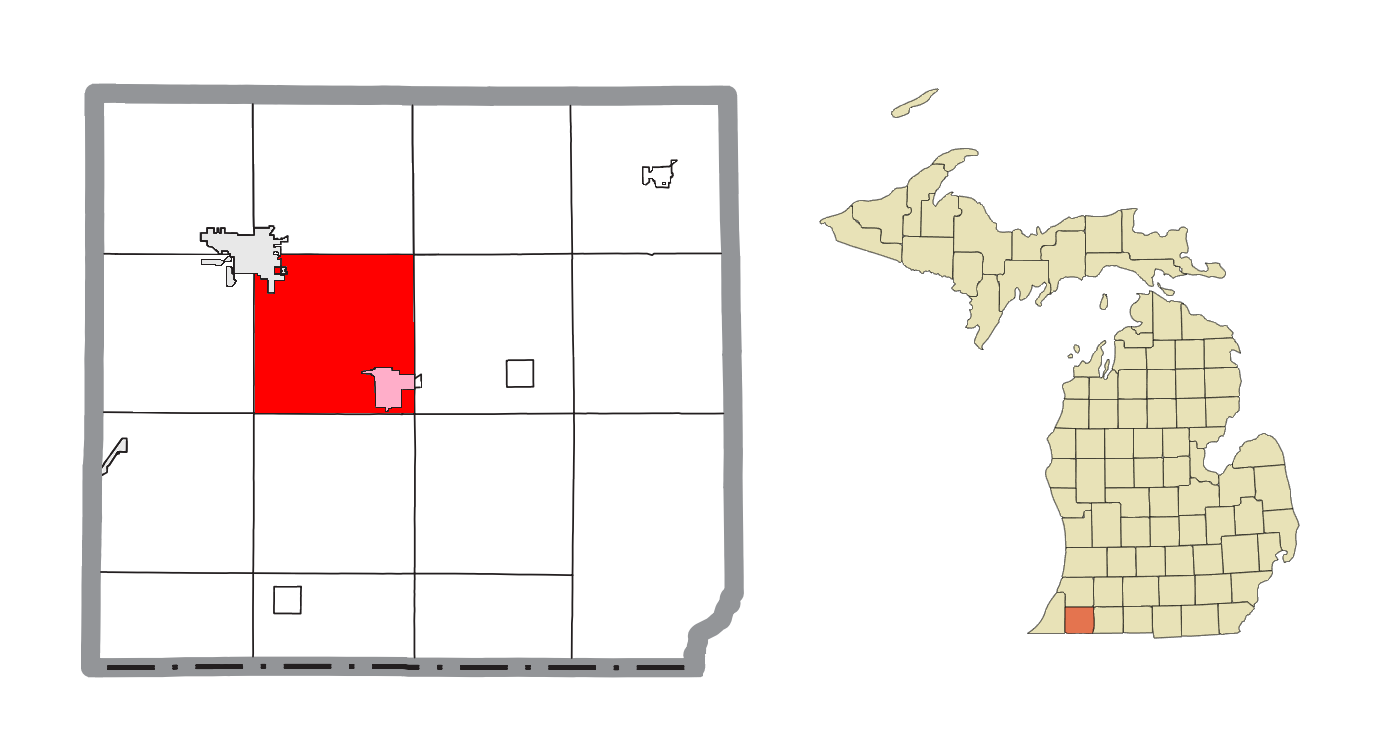
- Location within Cass County (red) and an administered portion of the village of Cassopolis (pink)

- Location within the state of Michigan LaGrange Township (the United States)
- Coordinates: 41°56′05″N 86°01′17″W
- Country: United States
- State: Michigan
- County: Cass

Area
  - Total: 34.6 sq mi (89.7 km^{2})
  - Land: 33.2 sq mi (85.9 km^{2})
  - Water: 1.5 sq mi (3.8 km^{2})
- Elevation: 814 ft (248 m)

Population (2020)
  - Total: 3,787
  - Density: 114/sq mi (44.1/km^{2})
- Time zone: UTC-5 (Eastern (EST))
  - Summer (DST): UTC-4 (EDT)
- ZIP code(s): 49031, 49057
- Area code: 269
- FIPS code: 26-44140
- GNIS feature ID: 1626569
- Website: Official website

LaGrange Township is a civil township of Cass County in the U.S. state of Michigan. The population was 3,787 at the 2020 census.

== Geography ==
LaGrange Township is located just northwest of the center of Cass County. It is bordered by the city of Dowagiac to the northwest. The village of Cassopolis, the Cass County seat, is in the southeast part of the township. The unincorporated community of LaGrange is in the center of the township, at the west end of LaGrange Lake.

According to the United States Census Bureau, the township has a total area of 34.6 square miles (89.7 km^{2}), of which 33.2 square miles (85.9 km^{2}) is land and 1.5 square miles (3.8 km^{2}), or 4.19%, is water.

== Demographics ==
Historical population
Census	Pop.	Note	%±
2000	3,340		—
2010	3,500		4.8%
2020	3,787		8.2%

As of the census of 2000, there were 3,340 people, 1,351 households, and 909 families residing in the township. The population density was 99.6 inhabitants per square mile (38.5/km^{2}). There were 1,607 housing units at an average density of 47.9 per square mile (18.5/km^{2}). The racial makeup of the township was 72.69% White, 18.89% African American, 0.42% Native American, 2.22% Asian, 1.08% from other races, and 4.70% from two or more races. Hispanic or Latino of any race were 1.86% of the population.

There were 1,351 households, out of which 31.1% had children under the age of 18 living with them, 51.3% were married couples living together, 11.8% had a female householder with no husband present, and 32.7% were non-families. 28.3% of all households were made up of individuals, and 10.5% had someone living alone who was 65 years of age or older. The average household size was 2.47 and the average family size was 3.02.

In the township the population was spread out, with 26.4% under the age of 18, 7.8% from 18 to 24, 27.8% from 25 to 44, 24.2% from 45 to 64, and 13.7% who were 65 years of age or older. The median age was 37 years. For every 100 females, there were 93.3 males. For every 100 females age 18 and over, there were 91.4 males.

The median income for a household in the township was $35,566, and the median income for a family was $45,066. Males had a median income of $33,830 versus $23,542 for females. The per capita income for the township was $17,221. About 6.3% of families and 10.6% of the population were below the poverty line, including 12.9% of those under age 18 and 8.0% of those age 65 or over.

== Education ==
Much of the township is zoned to Cassopolis Public Schools. Other parts are zoned to Dowagiac Union School District.
