= Marcellus, Michigan =

- Village
- logo

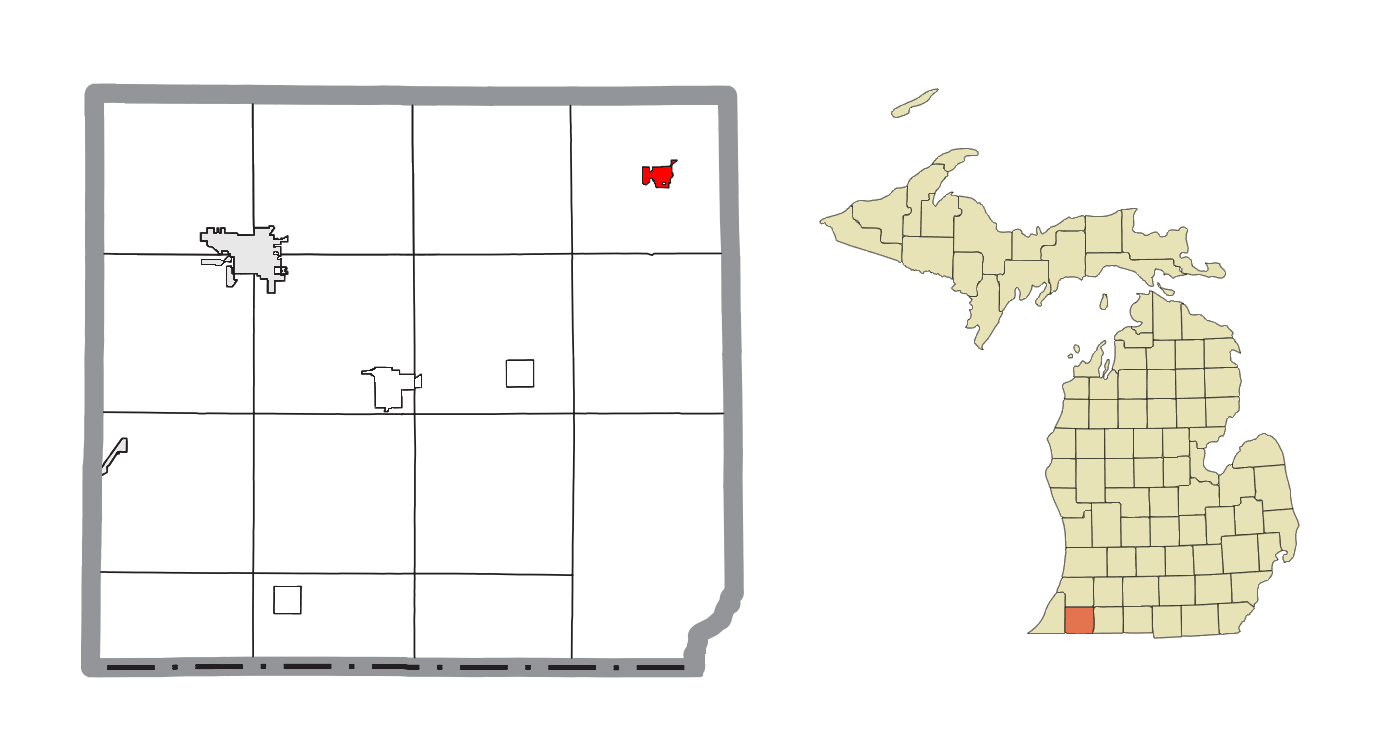
- Location within Cass County

- Location within the state of Michigan
- Coordinates: 42°01′34″N 85°48′48″W
- Country: United States
- State: Michigan
- County: Cass
- Township: Marcellus

Government
  - Type: Village council

Area
  - Total: 0.68 sq mi (1.77 km^{2})
  - Land: 0.68 sq mi (1.77 km^{2})
  - Water: 0.0039 sq mi (0.01 km^{2})
- Elevation: 896 ft (273 m)

Population (2020)
  - Total: 1,074
  - Density: 1,575.1/sq mi (608.14/km^{2})
- Time zone: UTC-5 (Eastern (EST))
  - Summer (DST): UTC-4 (EDT)
- ZIP code(s): 49067
- Area code: 269
- FIPS code: 26-51460
- GNIS feature ID: 0631539
- Website: Official website

Marcellus is a village in Cass County in the U.S. state of Michigan. The population was 1,074 at the 2020 census. The village is located within Marcellus Township. It is part of the South Bend–Mishawaka, IN-MI, Metropolitan Statistical Area.

== History ==
The first settler in the Marcellus area was John Bair, who came in October 1832. He was followed almost a year later by Daniel Driskel, in 1833. In 1835, 11 other families settled in Marcellus, and by 1836, 28 families had settled there.

At the time of the organization of the township the citizens wanted to call it Cambria; however, since there was already a township by that name in Michigan, their Representative at that time, Judge Littlejohn of Allegan, proposed they name it after Roman Emperor Flavius Marcellus. As a result, on June 16, 1843, the township was officially named Marcellus. Elections were held on the same night and Daniel G. Rouse was elected Township Supervisor, Guerdor R. Beebee was elected Treasurer, and Ephraim Huyatt was elected Clerk.

In the winter of 1870–71 the Peninsular Railroad came through Marcellus, infusing life into the small township. The depot was originally on the east side of town; however, because the business district was far from the depot, the depot was moved in 1898. After this move, business began rapidly expanding and an addition was added to the station to meet the increased traffic demands. By 1911, ten passenger trains stopped at the depot every day.

Marcellus became an official village in 1879, with over 500 residents. Three years later it had grown and included 2 churches, 3 dry goods stores, 3 groceries, 3 millinery shops, 2 drug stores, 2 meat markets, 2 hotels, 2 tin shops, a bank, 2 stave factories, 2 harness shops, a hardware store, a furniture store, a restaurant, a printing business, a tailor shop, a cooper shop, a steam saw mill, a sash and blind manufacturer, 4 doctors, 2 lawyers, 2 justices of the peace, and a newspaper.

During its height, Marcellus was also home to two theaters, a bowling alley, and a pool hall. Each year it hosts the National Bluegill Frolic, and previously hosted a parade, fishing tournament, and beauty pageant which attracted thousands each year.

== Geography ==
According to the United States Census Bureau, the village has a total area of 0.59 square miles (1.53 km^{2}), of which 0.58 square miles (1.50 km^{2}) is land and 0.01 square miles (0.03 km^{2}) is water.

== Demographics ==
Historical population
Census	Pop.	Note	%±
1880	635		—
1890	830		30.7%
1900	1,025		23.5%
1910	1,047		2.1%
1920	966		−7.7%
1930	944		−2.3%
1940	992		5.1%
1950	1,014		2.2%
1960	1,073		5.8%
1970	1,139		6.2%
1980	1,134		−0.4%
1990	1,193		5.2%
2000	1,162		−2.6%
2010	1,198		3.1%
2020	1,074		−10.4%
U.S. Decennial Census

=== 2010 census ===
As of the census of 2010, there were 1,198 people, 441 households, and 327 families residing in the village. The population density was 2,065.5 inhabitants per square mile (797.5/km^{2}). There were 493 housing units at an average density of 850.0 per square mile (328.2/km^{2}). The racial makeup of the village was 96.5% White, 1.6% African American, 0.3% Native American, 0.3% Asian, 0.1% from other races, and 1.3% from two or more races. Hispanic or Latino of any race were 1.5% of the population.

There were 441 households, of which 41.0% had children under the age of 18 living with them, 51.2% were married couples living together, 16.6% had a female householder with no husband present, 6.3% had a male householder with no wife present, and 25.9% were non-families. 20.4% of all households were made up of individuals, and 9.6% had someone living alone who was 65 years of age or older. The average household size was 2.72 and the average family size was 3.13.

The median age in the village was 34.9 years. 29.6% of residents were under the age of 18; 7.5% were between the ages of 18 and 24; 28.3% were from 25 to 44; 21.5% were from 45 to 64; and 13.1% were 65 years of age or older. The gender makeup of the village was 48.2% male and 51.8% female.

=== 2000 census ===
As of the census of 2000, there were 1,162 people, 437 households, and 319 families residing in the village. The population density was 1,719.3 inhabitants per square mile (663.8/km^{2}). There were 462 housing units at an average density of 683.6 per square mile (263.9/km^{2}). The racial makeup of the village was 96.82% White, 0.86% African American, 0.52% Native American, 0.09% Asian, 0.34% from other races, and 1.38% from two or more races. Hispanic or Latino of any race were 1.12% of the population.

There were 437 households, out of which 38.4% had children under the age of 18 living with them, 54.9% were married couples living together, 14.0% had a female householder with no husband present, and 26.8% were non-families. 22.7% of all households were made up of individuals, and 11.4% had someone living alone who was 65 years of age or older. The average household size was 2.66 and the average family size was 3.10.

In the village, the population was spread out, with 30.1% under the age of 18, 8.7% from 18 to 24, 29.9% from 25 to 44, 18.7% from 45 to 64, and 12.6% who were 65 years of age or older. The median age was 32 years. For every 100 females, there were 86.5 males. For every 100 females age 18 and over, there were 85.0 males.

The median income for a household in the village was $38,958, and the median income for a family was $45,000. Males had a median income of $33,750 versus $22,826 for females. The per capita income for the village was $16,296. About 8.3% of families and 11.7% of the population were below the poverty line, including 14.9% of those under age 18 and 10.3% of those age 65 or over.

== Education ==
It is zoned to Marcellus Community Schools.
