= Silver Creek Township, Michigan =

- Civil township
- Seal

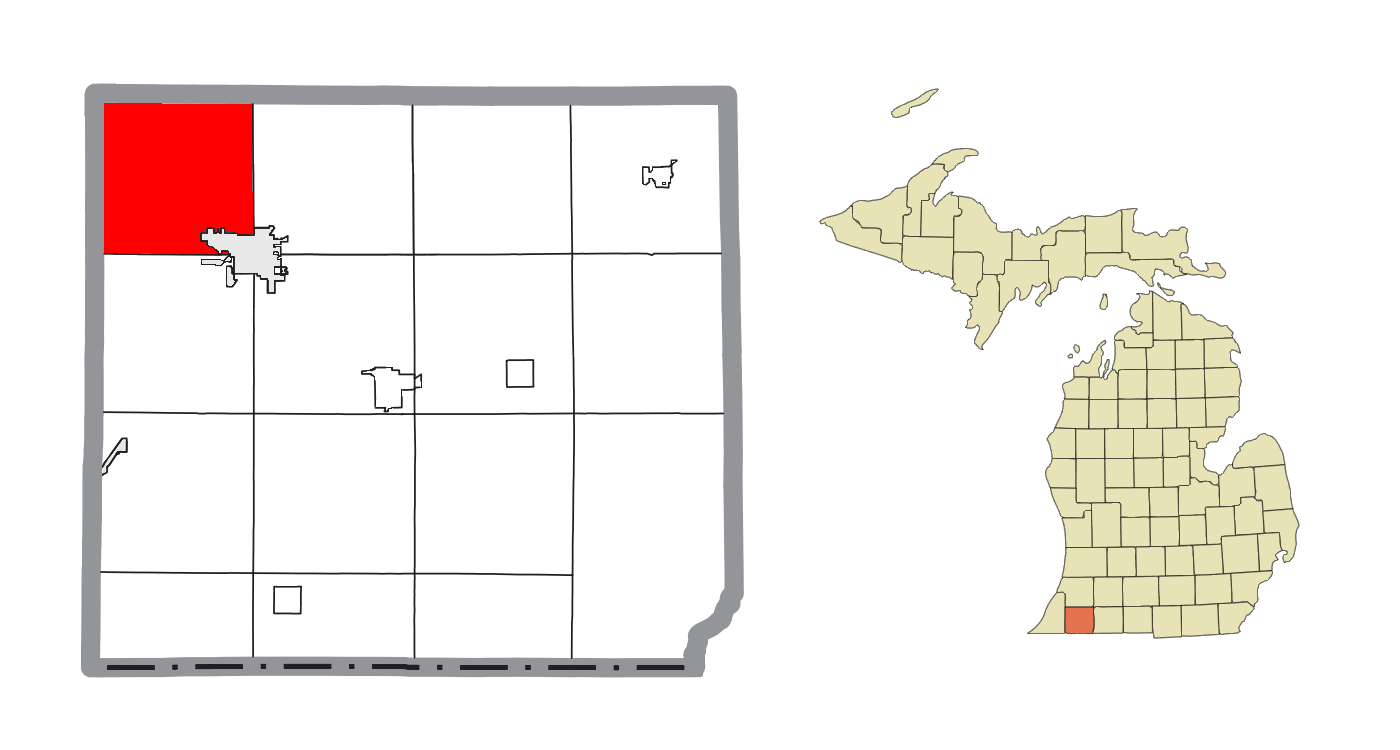
- Location within Cass County

- Location within the state of Michigan Silver Creek Township (the United States)
- Coordinates: 42°01′39″N 86°10′31″W
- Country: United States
- State: Michigan
- County: Cass

Area
  - Total: 34.2 sq mi (88.6 km^{2})
  - Land: 32.0 sq mi (82.8 km^{2})
  - Water: 2.3 sq mi (5.9 km^{2})
- Elevation: 801 ft (244 m)

Population (2020)
  - Total: 3,051
  - Density: 95.4/sq mi (36.8/km^{2})
- Time zone: UTC-5 (Eastern (EST))
  - Summer (DST): UTC-4 (EDT)
- ZIP code(s): 49047, 49111
- Area code: 269
- FIPS code: 26-73940
- GNIS feature ID: 1627083
- Website: Official website

Silver Creek Township is a civil township of Cass County in the U.S. state of Michigan. The population was 3,051 at the 2020 census.

== Geography ==
Silver Creek Township is located in the northwest corner of Cass County, bordered to the west by Berrien County and to the north by Van Buren County. The city of Dowagiac borders the township to the southeast.

According to the United States Census Bureau, the township has a total area of 34.2 square miles (88.6 km^{2}), of which 32.0 square miles (82.8 km^{2}) is land and 2.3 square miles (5.9 km^{2}), or 6.62%, is water. The township is largely agricultural, though it has a large influx of summer visitors who own cottages or stay at summer resorts in the Sister Lakes area in the northwest part of the township.

== Communities ==
- Cushing was formed in 1874 and originally called Stark's Corners. It had a post office from 1880 until 1904.
- The unincorporated community of Sister Lakes, plus the lakes themselves, which are primarily located in adjacent Keeler Township in Van Buren County, extend into the township. The northern half of Silver Creek Township is served by the Sister Lakes Volunteer Fire Department, and the southern half is served by the Indian Lake Fire Department.

== Demographics ==
Historical population
Census	Pop.	Note	%±
2000	3,491		—
2010	3,218		−7.8%
2020	3,051		−5.2%

As of the census of 2000, there were 3,491 people, 1,299 households, and 958 families residing in the township. The population density was 108.5 inhabitants per square mile (41.9/km^{2}). There were 2,362 housing units at an average density of 73.4 per square mile (28.3/km^{2}). The racial makeup of the township was 90.52% White, 0.83% African American, 1.17% Native American, 0.14% Asian, 5.67% from other races, and 1.66% from two or more races. Hispanic or Latino of any race were 10.08% of the population.

There were 1,299 households, out of which 27.5% had children under the age of 18 living with them, 63.8% were married couples living together, 7.3% had a female householder with no husband present, and 26.2% were non-families. 22.6% of all households were made up of individuals, and 10.1% had someone living alone who was 65 years of age or older. The average household size was 2.56 and the average family size was 3.01.

In the township the population was spread out, with 25.4% under the age of 18, 7.8% from 18 to 24, 23.8% from 25 to 44, 28.0% from 45 to 64, and 15.1% who were 65 years of age or older. The median age was 40 years. For every 100 females, there were 96.7 males. For every 100 females age 18 and over, there were 98.2 males.

The median income for a household in the township was $42,572, and the median income for a family was $46,891. Males had a median income of $36,597 versus $20,428 for females. The per capita income for the township was $18,866. About 6.0% of families and 10.1% of the population were below the poverty line, including 10.4% of those under age 18 and 8.8% of those age 65 or over.
