= Pokagon Township, Michigan =

- Civil township
- logo

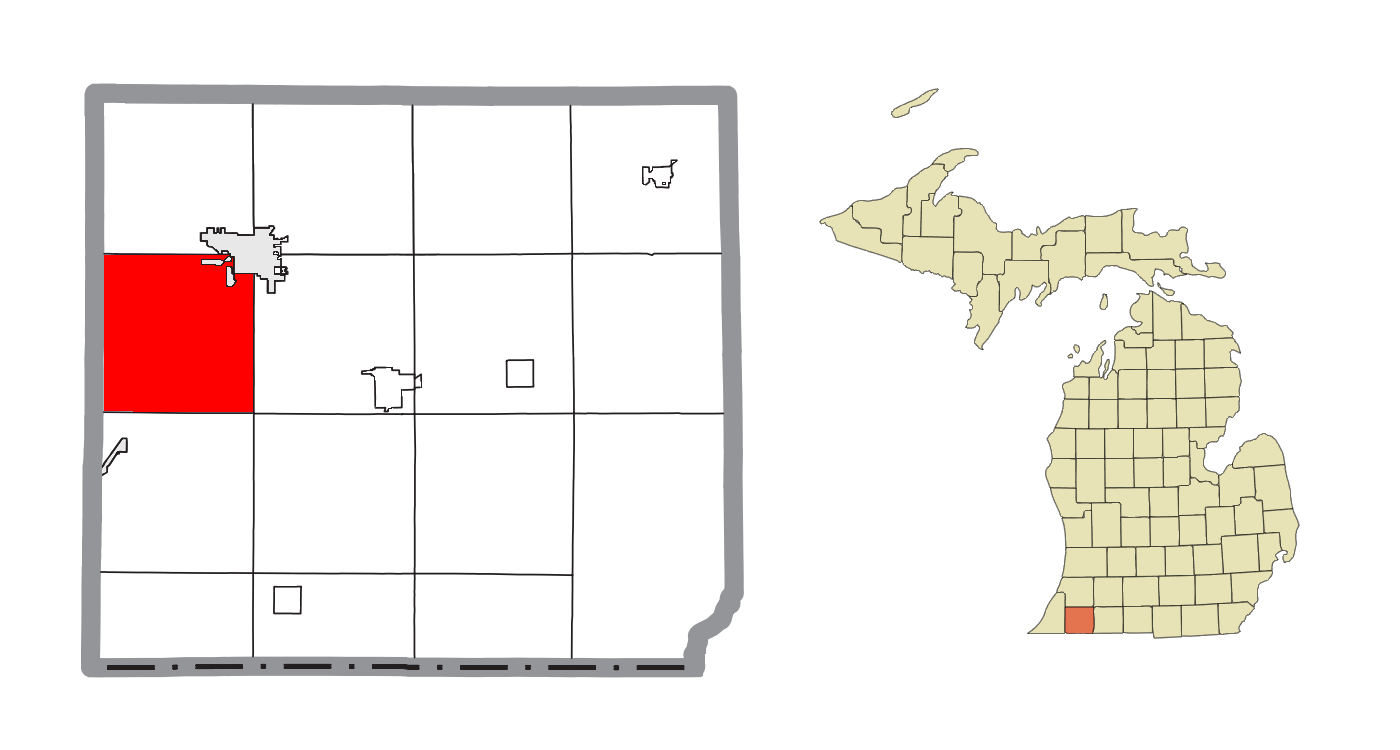
- Location within Cass County

- Location within the state of Michigan Pokagon Township (the United States)
- Coordinates: 41°56′27″N 86°10′14″W
- Country: United States
- State: Michigan
- County: Cass
- Established: 1829

Area
  - Total: 34.2 sq mi (88.7 km^{2})
  - Land: 34.0 sq mi (88.1 km^{2})
  - Water: 0.23 sq mi (0.6 km^{2})
- Elevation: 751 ft (229 m)

Population (2020)
  - Total: 2,119
  - Density: 62.3/sq mi (24.1/km^{2})
- Time zone: UTC-5 (Eastern (EST))
  - Summer (DST): UTC-4 (EDT)
- ZIP code(s): 49047, 49120
- Area code: 269
- FIPS code: 26-65300
- GNIS feature ID: 1626922
- Website: Official website

Pokagon Township is a civil township of Cass County in the U.S. state of Michigan. The population was 2,119 at the 2020 census. The township includes the unincorporated communities of Pokagon and Sumnerville, adjacent to each other on M-51.

Pokagon Township is the location of the first public performance of the hymn "The Old Rugged Cross", the birthplace of journalist Webb Miller, and the location of the government offices of the Pokagon Band of Potawatomi Indians.

== Geography ==
Pokagon Township is located in western Cass County and is bordered to the west by Berrien County. The city of Dowagiac is on the northeast border of the township.

According to the United States Census Bureau, the township has a total area of 34.2 square miles (88.7 km^{2}), of which 34.0 square miles (88.1 km^{2}) is land and 0.23 square miles (0.6 km^{2}), or 0.67%, is water. The Dowagiac River, a tributary of the St. Joseph River, flows from north to south across the western side of the township.

== Demographics ==
Historical population
Census	Pop.	Note	%±
2000	2,199		—
2010	2,029		−7.7%
2020	2,119		4.4%

As of the census of 2000, there were 2,199 people, 818 households, and 630 families residing in the township. The population density was 63.6 inhabitants per square mile (24.6/km^{2}). There were 912 housing units at an average density of 26.4 per square mile (10.2/km^{2}). The racial makeup of the township was 86.95% White, 6.46% African American, 1.09% Native American, 0.64% Asian, 2.50% from other races, and 2.36% from two or more races. Hispanic or Latino of any race were 5.41% of the population.

There were 818 households, out of which 30.3% had children under the age of 18 living with them, 63.1% were married couples living together, 9.7% had a female householder with no husband present, and 22.9% were non-families. 19.1% of all households were made up of individuals, and 9.3% had someone living alone who was 65 years of age or older. The average household size was 2.59 and the average family size was 2.93.

In the township the population was spread out, with 23.6% under the age of 18, 7.5% from 18 to 24, 26.4% from 25 to 44, 27.1% from 45 to 64, and 15.5% who were 65 years of age or older. The median age was 40 years. For every 100 females, there were 100.8 males. For every 100 females age 18 and over, there were 100.2 males.

The median income for a household in the township was $38,850, and the median income for a family was $41,286. Males had a median income of $30,040 versus $25,573 for females. The per capita income for the township was $18,215. About 6.1% of families and 8.3% of the population were below the poverty line, including 10.1% of those under age 18 and 5.0% of those age 65 or over.
