= Milton Township, Cass County, Michigan =

Milton Township, Michigan
- Civil township
- Seal

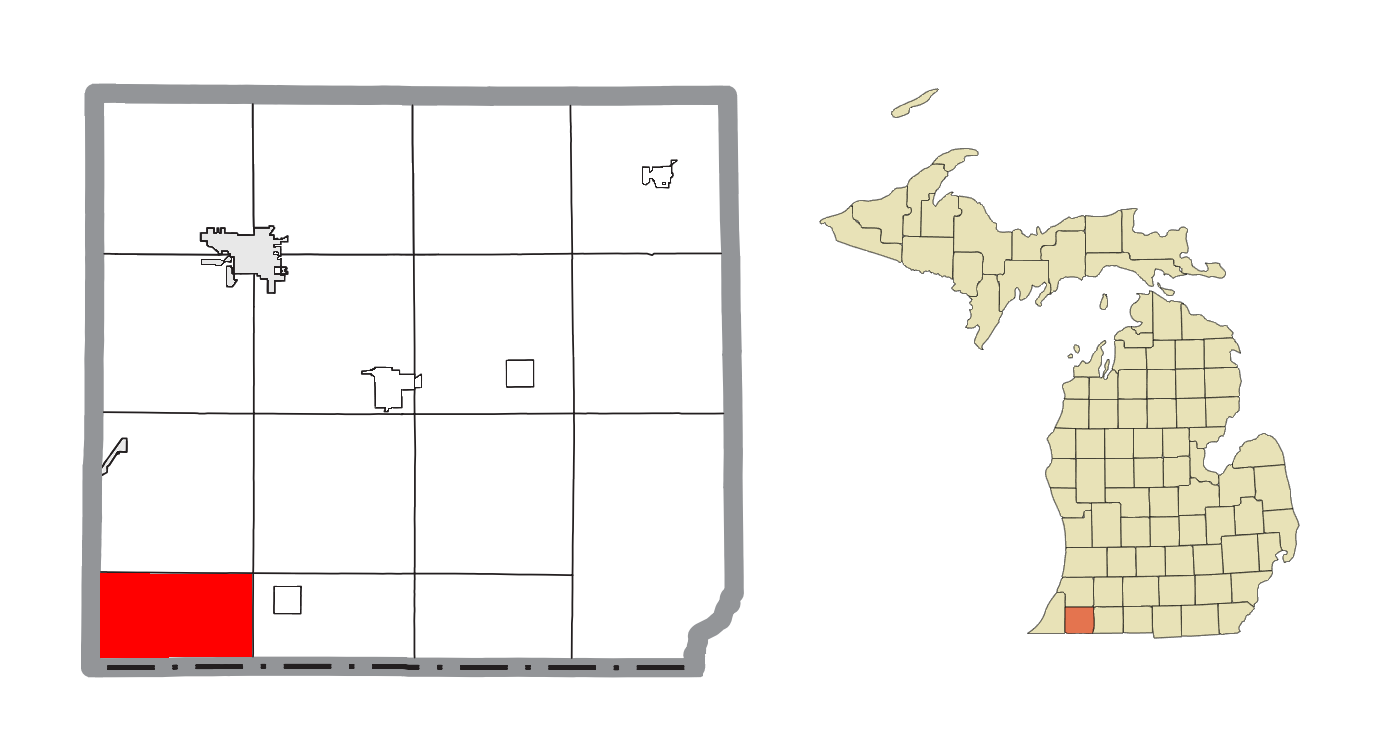
- Location within Cass County

- Location within the state of Michigan Milton Township (the United States)
- Coordinates: 41°47′18″N 86°11′02″W
- Country: United States
- State: Michigan
- County: Cass

Area
  - Total: 21.3 sq mi (55.2 km^{2})
  - Land: 21.1 sq mi (54.7 km^{2})
  - Water: 0.23 sq mi (0.6 km^{2})
- Elevation: 843 ft (257 m)

Population (2020)
  - Total: 3,128
  - Density: 148/sq mi (57.2/km^{2})
- Time zone: UTC-5 (Eastern (EST))
  - Summer (DST): UTC-4 (EDT)
- ZIP code(s): 49120
- Area code: 269
- FIPS code: 26-54460
- GNIS feature ID: 1626748
- Website: Official website

Milton Township is a civil township of Cass County in the U.S. state of Michigan. The population was 3,128 at the 2020 census.

== Communities ==
There are no incorporated municipalities in the township.

- Dover was a former post office in the township that operated from May 28, 1836, until October 26, 1841. Peter Truitt, from Slatter Neck, Sussex County, Delaware, settled on 80 acres (320,000 m^{2}) near the center of the township in 1831. He operated a tavern on the old Chicago Road between Chicago and Detroit (now US 12), known as the "White Oak Tavern" because of an immense oak tree near the house. A second post office named Truitt's operated July 26, 1897, until June 29, 1901, at a station on the Cleveland, Cincinnati, Chicago and St. Louis Railway Grocer James W. Smith as postmaster.

== Geography ==
Milton Township is located in the southwestern corner of Cass County and is bordered by Berrien County to the west and the state of Indiana to the south. The city of Niles, Michigan, is 5 miles (8 km) to the northwest, and South Bend, Indiana, is 10 miles (16 km) to the south. The community of Granger, Indiana, is directly to the south of the township.

According to the United States Census Bureau, Milton Township has a total area of 21.3 square miles (55.2 km^{2}), of which 21.1 square miles (54.7 km^{2}) is land and 0.23 square miles (0.6 km^{2}), or 1.00%, is water.

== Demographics ==
Historical population
Census	Pop.	Note	%±
2000	2,646		—
2010	3,878		46.6%
2020	3,128		−19.3%

As of the census of 2000, there were 2,646 people, 940 households, and 783 families residing in the township. The population density was 124.4 inhabitants per square mile (48.0/km^{2}). There were 971 housing units at an average density of 45.7 per square mile (17.6/km^{2}). The racial makeup of the township was 95.12% White, 2.19% African American, 0.19% Native American, 0.38% Asian, 0.45% from other races, and 1.66% from two or more races. Hispanic or Latino of any race were 1.63% of the population.

There were 940 households, out of which 34.8% had children under the age of 18 living with them, 73.8% were married couples living together, 6.5% had a female householder with no husband present, and 16.7% were non-families. 13.0% of all households were made up of individuals, and 6.3% had someone living alone who was 65 years of age or older. The average household size was 2.81 and the average family size was 3.04.

In the township the population was spread out, with 26.1% under the age of 18, 6.0% from 18 to 24, 27.6% from 25 to 44, 29.6% from 45 to 64, and 10.7% who were 65 years of age or older. The median age was 40 years. For every 100 females, there were 101.2 males. For every 100 females age 18 and over, there were 99.5 males.

The median income for a household in the township was $53,750, and the median income for a family was $59,896. Males had a median income of $40,417 versus $26,050 for females. The per capita income for the township was $23,168. About 4.9% of families and 6.6% of the population were below the poverty line, including 10.6% of those under age 18 and 9.2% of those age 65 or over.
