= Cass County, Michigan =

County in Michigan, United States

- County
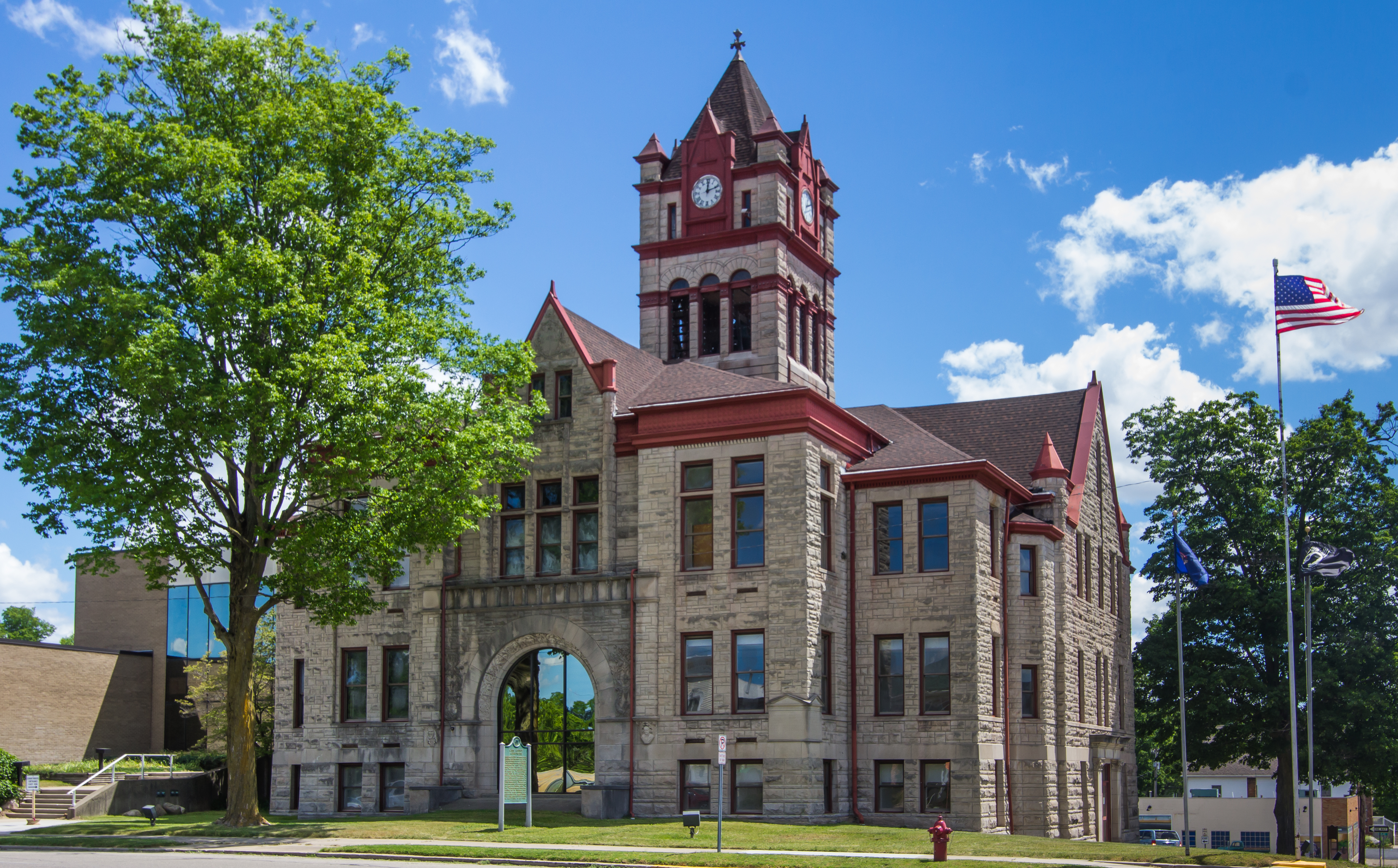
- Cass County Courthouse in Cassopolis

- Seal

- Location within the U.S. state of Michigan
- Coordinates: 41°55′N 85°59′W
- Country: United States
- State: Michigan
- Founded: 1829
- Named for: Lewis Cass
- Seat: Cassopolis
- Largest city: Dowagiac

Area
  - Total: 508 sq mi (1,320 km^{2})
  - Land: 490 sq mi (1,300 km^{2})
  - Water: 18 sq mi (47 km^{2}) 3.6%

Population (2020)
  - Total: 51,589
  - Estimate (2025): 51,677 ▲
  - Density: 110/sq mi (41/km^{2})
- Congressional district: 5th
- Website: www.casscountymi.org

Cass County is a county in the U.S. state of Michigan. As of the 2020 Census, the population was 51,589. Its county seat is Cassopolis. Cass County is included in the South Bend-Mishawaka metropolitan area which has a total population of 316,663 and is considered part of the Michiana region.

== History ==
The county is named for Lewis Cass, the Michigan Territorial Governor at the time the county was created in 1829. Cass later served as the United States Secretary of War under President Andrew Jackson, thus making a case for including Cass County as one of Michigan's "cabinet counties".

Cass County was not as heavily forested and had more fertile prairie land than other nearby areas of Michigan. During early settlement, it attracted numerous settlers who wanted to farm and grew more rapidly in population.

The county quickly developed industry as well. As early as 1830, a carding mill was started in the county on Dowagiac Creek, a branch of the St. Joseph River. Although the Sauk Trail (Chicago Road) passed through the southern part of the county, early settlement did not come primarily from eastern Michigan. Instead, settlers from Ohio and Indiana migrated who had learned of available prairie lands, reaching the Michigan Territory via a branch of the Chicago Road leading from Fort Wayne, Indiana. The population of Cass County was more than 3,000 by 1834.

Among the most prominent early settlers of Cass County were Baldwin Jenkins and Uzziel Putnam, who both came from Ohio by way of the Carey Mission in Berrien County. Jenkins had been born at Fort Jenkins in Green County, Pennsylvania, and had migrated to Tennessee. He left that state as he was opposed to the institution of slavery. Putnam, who had lived in Massachusetts and New York, migrated to Cass from Erie County, Ohio, by way of Fort Wayne. These settlers, and their families, established the nucleus of the village of Pokagon on Pokagon Prairie in 1825. The next year, a settlement was made on Beardsley's Prairie, where the village of Edwardsburg was laid out in 1831.

The village of Cassopolis was platted in 1831 and intended as the county seat, because it was the geographical center of the county. It had no settlers at the time.

=== Black settlers ===
After 1840, the black population of Cass County grew rapidly as families were attracted by white defiance of discriminatory laws, including the Fugitive Slave Law. Numerous highly supportive Quakers helped blacks settle in the area, and the land was low-priced. Free and refugee blacks found Cass County to be a haven, some with mixed Native ancestry, especially Saponi, Lumbee, and Pamunkey. Their development of a thriving community attracted the attention of southern slaveholders.

In 1847 and 1849, planters from Bourbon and Boone counties in Northern Kentucky led raids into Cass County to recapture escaped slaves. They were "surrounded by crowds of angry farmers armed with clubs, scythes, and other farm implements", resisting their attempt.

The raids failed to accomplish their objective but strengthened Southern demands for passage of the Fugitive Slave Act of 1850, which required residents and law enforcement even in free states to support capture of refugee slaves, and increased penalties for failure to do so. Biased toward slaveholders and slavecatchers, it required little documentation and put free blacks at risk for capture and sale into slavery. Many in the North resisted the law, especially in abolitionist strongholds, and it increased tensions contributing to the Civil War.

Cass County became known early on for the anti-slavery attitudes of its population. Pennsylvania Quakers made a settlement in Penn Township in 1829. This community later became a prominent station on the Underground Railroad. One established Underground Railroad route ran from Niles through Cassopolis, Schoolcraft, Climax, and Battle Creek, and thence along the old Territorial Road.

=== Historical markers ===
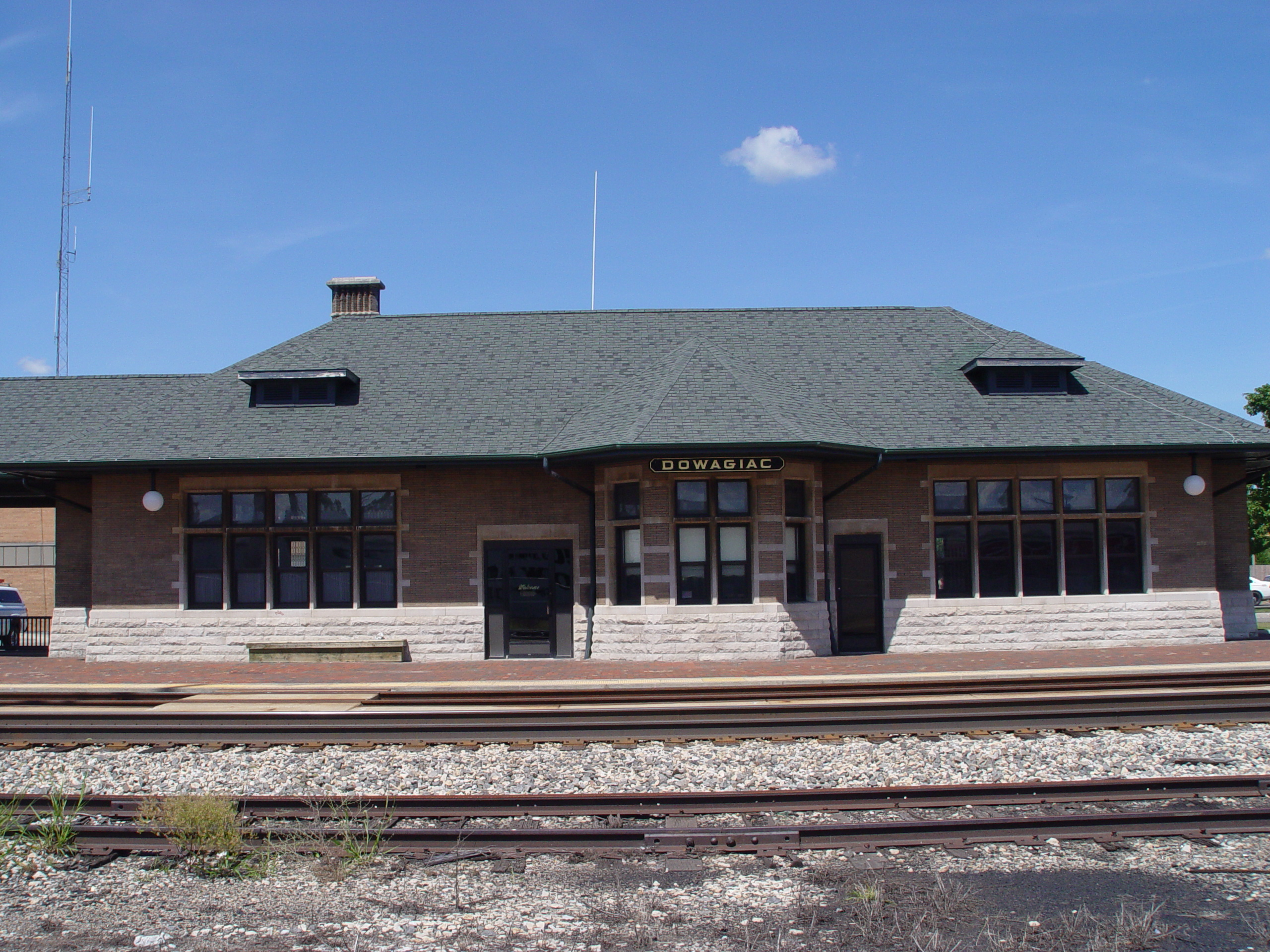
Dowagiac Depot

Some 26 historical sites in Cass County have been listed on the National Register of Historic Places and designated by state historical markers as of December 2009.

Name of Site	City Location	Date Listed	Marker erected
Cass County Courthouse	Cassopolis	12/14/1976	08/17/1977
Cass County Office Building / Masonic Temple	Cassopolis	07/23/1985	N/A
Centennial Hall Building	Marcellus, Michigan	03/19/1980	N/A
Chain Lake Baptist Church Cemetery	Calvin Township, Michigan	12/05/1986	04/07/1992
First Methodist Episcopal Church	Dowagiac	07/18/1996	10/12/1999
First Methodist Episcopal Church of Pokagon	Pokagon Township	04/01/2002	N/A
First Universalist Church of Dowagiac	Dowagiac	05/30/1984	09/08/1982
Jarius Hitchcox House	Union	12/10/1971	N/A
Indian Lake Cemetery	Silver Creek Township	03/15/1990	N/A
Carroll Sherman Jones House	Marcellus, Michigan	03/15/1990	N/A
George Washington Jones House	Marcellus, Michigan	12/09/1994	01/17/1986
Joseph Webster Lee House	Ontwa Township	03/19/1987	N/A
Mason District Number 5 Schoolhouse	Mason Township	06/10/1980	10/06/1981
Methodist Episcopal Church	Dowagiac	01/20/2000	02/02/2000
Michigan Central Railroad Dowagiac Depot	Dowagiac	N/A	N/A
George Newton House	Volinia Township	11/14/1974	10/07/1977
Poe's Corners	Newberg Township	03/21/1991	06/25/1991
Presbyterian Church of Edwardsburg	Edwardsburg	04/20/2000	06/09/2000
Sylvador T. Read House	Cassopolis	06/10/1980	N/A
Sacred Heart of Mary Catholic Church	Silver Creek Township	01/16/1976	07/19/1977
Smith's Chapel and Cemetery	Milton Township	04/24/1979	04/07/1981
Sumnerville Cemetery	Niles, Michigan	01/20/2000	N/A
Sumnerville Mounds	Dowagiac, Michigan	01/20/2000	2000
Thompson Road/Air Line Railroad Bridge	Howard Township	N/A	N/A
Underground Railroad Informational Designation	Vandalia, Michigan	01/19/1957	04/12/1957
Wayne Township School District No. 7 School	Wayne Township	04/19/1990	N/A

== Geography ==
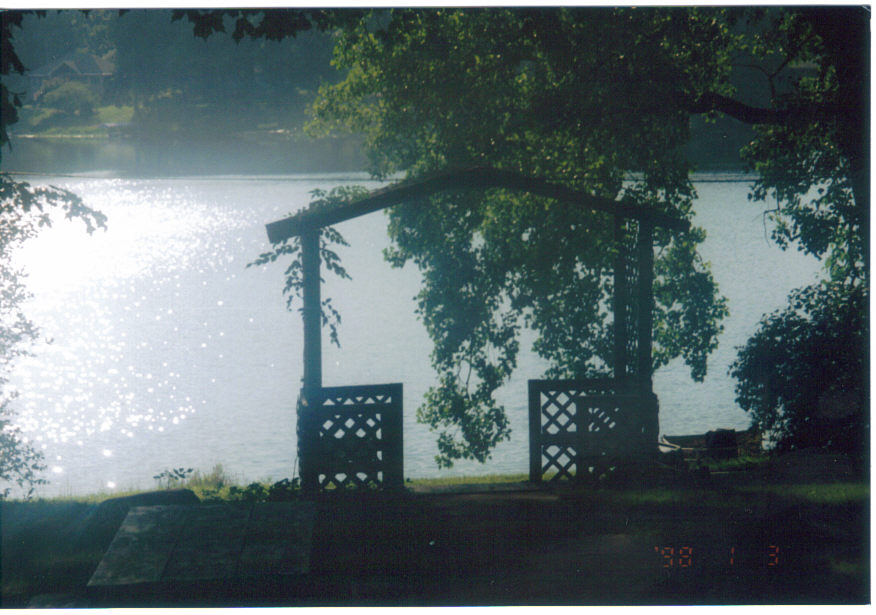
Lake Driskel in Jones, an unincorporated community in Cass County

According to the U.S. Census Bureau, the county has a total area of 508 square miles (1,320 km^{2}), of which 490 square miles (1,300 km^{2}) is land and 18 square miles (47 km^{2}) (3.6%) is water. It is the smallest county in Michigan by total area.

=== Major highways ===
- US 12
- M-40
- M-51
- M-60
- Bus. M-60
- M-62
- M-152
- M-216
- M-217

=== Adjacent counties ===
- Van Buren County (north)
- St. Joseph County (east)
- Berrien County (west)
- Elkhart County, Indiana (southeast)
- St. Joseph County, Indiana (southwest)

== Demographics ==
Historical population
Census	Pop.	Note	%±
1830	919		—
1840	5,710		521.3%
1850	10,907		91.0%
1860	17,721		62.5%
1870	21,094		19.0%
1880	22,009		4.3%
1890	20,953		−4.8%
1900	20,876		−0.4%
1910	20,624		−1.2%
1920	20,395		−1.1%
1930	20,888		2.4%
1940	21,910		4.9%
1950	28,185		28.6%
1960	36,932		31.0%
1970	43,312		17.3%
1980	49,499		14.3%
1990	49,477		0.0%
2000	51,104		3.3%
2010	52,293		2.3%
2020	51,589		−1.3%
2025 (est.)	51,677	▲	0.2%
U.S. Decennial Census; 1790-1960 1900-1990; 1990-2000 2010-2018

=== Racial and ethnic composition ===
Cass County, Michigan – Racial and ethnic composition Note: the US Census treats Hispanic/Latino as an ethnic category. This table excludes Latinos from the racial categories and assigns them to a separate category. Hispanics/Latinos may be of any race.
Race / Ethnicity (NH = Non-Hispanic)	Pop 1980	Pop 1990	Pop 2000	Pop 2010	Pop 2020	% 1980	% 1990	% 2000	% 2010	% 2020
White alone (NH)	44,547	44,423	45,069	45,704	43,309	90.00%	89.79%	88.19%	87.40%	83.95%
Black or African American alone (NH)	4,114	3,684	3,107	2,776	2,272	8.31%	7.45%	6.08%	5.31%	4.40%
Native American or Alaska Native alone (NH)	256	463	388	476	521	0.52%	0.94%	0.76%	0.91%	1.01%
Asian alone (NH)	110	171	268	334	316	0.22%	0.35%	0.52%	0.64%	0.61%
Native Hawaiian or Pacific Islander alone (NH)	x	x	2	6	11	x	x	0.00%	0.01%	0.02%
Other race alone (NH)	135	85	90	70	218	0.27%	0.17%	0.18%	0.13%	0.42%
Mixed race or Multiracial (NH)	x	x	947	1,357	2,781	x	x	1.85%	2.59%	5.39%
Hispanic or Latino (any race)	337	651	1,233	1,570	2,161	0.68%	1.32%	2.41%	3.00%	4.19%
Total	49,499	49,477	51,104	52,293	51,589	100.00%	100.00%	100.00%	100.00%	100.00%

=== 2020 census ===
As of the 2020 census, the county had a population of 51,589. The median age was 44.8 years. 21.5% of residents were under the age of 18 and 21.1% of residents were 65 years of age or older. For every 100 females there were 99.5 males, and for every 100 females age 18 and over there were 97.9 males age 18 and over.

The racial makeup of the county was 85.3% White, 4.5% Black or African American, 1.2% American Indian and Alaska Native, 0.6% Asian, <0.1% Native Hawaiian and Pacific Islander, 1.8% from some other race, and 6.6% from two or more races. Hispanic or Latino residents of any race comprised 4.2% of the population.

25.9% of residents lived in urban areas, while 74.1% lived in rural areas.

There were 20,707 households in the county, of which 27.8% had children under the age of 18 living in them. Of all households, 51.0% were married-couple households, 19.2% were households with a male householder and no spouse or partner present, and 22.3% were households with a female householder and no spouse or partner present. About 26.6% of all households were made up of individuals and 12.8% had someone living alone who was 65 years of age or older.

There were 25,291 housing units, of which 18.1% were vacant. Among occupied housing units, 80.1% were owner-occupied and 19.9% were renter-occupied. The homeowner vacancy rate was 1.3% and the rental vacancy rate was 5.6%.

=== 2010 census ===
As of the 2010 United States census, there were 52,293 people living in the county. 88.9% were White, 5.4% Black or African American, 1.0% Native American, 0.6% Asian, 1.1% of some other race and 3.0% of two or more races. 3.0% were Hispanic or Latino (of any race). 25.9% were of German, 10.0% English, 9.6% Irish, 8.1% American and 5.7% Polish ancestry.

=== 2000 census ===
As of the 2000 census, there were 51,104 people, 19,676 households, and 14,304 families living in the county. The population density was 104 inhabitants per square mile (40/km^{2}). There were 23,884 housing units at an average density of 48 per square mile (19/km^{2}). The racial makeup of the county was 89.19% White, 6.12% Black or African American, 0.82% Native American, 0.54% Asian, 0.01% Pacific Islander, 1.17% from other races, and 2.15% from two or more races. 2.41% of the population were Hispanic or Latino of any race. 26.6% were of German, 11.1% American, 10.3% Irish, 10.1% English and 5.0% Polish ancestry, 96.4% spoke only English, while 2.0% spoke Spanish at home.

There were 19,676 households, out of which 31.00% had children under the age of 18 living with them, 58.20% were married couples living together, 9.90% had a female householder with no husband present, and 27.30% were not family units. 22.60% of all households were made up of individuals, and 9.40% had someone living alone who was 65 years of age or older. The average household size was 2.56 and the average family size was 2.98.

In the county, 25.50% of the population was under the age of 18, 7.40% was from 18 to 24, 27.60% from 25 to 44, 26.00% from 45 to 64, and 13.60% was 65 years of age or older. The median age was 38 years. For every 100 females, there were 99.90 males. For every 100 females age 18 and over, there were 97.40 males.

The median income for a household in the county was $41,264, and the median income for a family was $46,901. Males had a median income of $35,546 versus $24,526 for females. The per capita income for the county was $19,474. About 6.80% of families and 9.90% of the population were below the poverty line, including 13.60% of those under age 18 and 8.80% of those age 65 or over.

== Government ==
United States presidential election results for Cass County, Michigan
Year	Republican		Democratic		Third party(ies)	
Year	No.	%	No.	%	No.	%
1884	2,764	48.25%	2,744	47.90%	221	3.86%
1888	2,929	50.62%	2,564	44.31%	293	5.06%
1892	2,731	47.71%	2,424	42.35%	569	9.94%
1896	3,034	49.05%	3,012	48.70%	139	2.25%
1900	3,217	51.81%	2,825	45.50%	167	2.69%
1904	3,150	57.61%	1,937	35.42%	381	6.97%
1908	3,082	52.72%	2,466	42.18%	298	5.10%
1912	1,462	27.14%	2,076	38.54%	1,849	34.32%
1916	2,518	46.67%	2,666	49.42%	211	3.91%
1920	4,498	74.25%	1,286	21.23%	274	4.52%
1924	4,545	59.93%	2,328	30.70%	711	9.38%
1928	5,720	70.24%	2,346	28.81%	77	0.95%
1932	3,994	41.45%	5,349	55.51%	293	3.04%
1936	4,525	43.74%	5,114	49.43%	706	6.82%
1940	6,868	60.95%	4,340	38.52%	60	0.53%
1944	6,566	65.33%	3,417	34.00%	68	0.68%
1948	5,615	62.17%	3,201	35.44%	216	2.39%
1952	8,479	64.86%	4,500	34.42%	93	0.71%
1956	8,899	64.54%	4,842	35.12%	47	0.34%
1960	8,585	56.79%	6,468	42.79%	64	0.42%
1964	5,925	40.19%	8,789	59.62%	28	0.19%
1968	6,996	46.93%	5,616	37.68%	2,294	15.39%
1972	10,398	66.31%	4,982	31.77%	301	1.92%
1976	9,893	55.15%	7,843	43.72%	203	1.13%
1980	11,206	56.78%	7,058	35.76%	1,471	7.45%
1984	11,647	63.32%	6,634	36.07%	113	0.61%
1988	10,229	57.61%	7,444	41.92%	83	0.47%
1992	7,391	36.44%	8,047	39.67%	4,845	23.89%
1996	7,373	41.01%	8,207	45.65%	2,400	13.35%
2000	10,545	53.19%	8,808	44.43%	472	2.38%
2004	12,964	57.12%	9,537	42.02%	196	0.86%
2008	11,114	47.14%	12,083	51.25%	379	1.61%
2012	12,659	56.29%	9,591	42.65%	240	1.07%
2016	14,243	63.04%	7,270	32.18%	1,082	4.79%
2020	16,699	63.63%	9,130	34.79%	413	1.57%
2024	18,505	66.40%	9,050	32.47%	316	1.13%

United States Senate election results for Cass County, Michigan1
Year	Republican		Democratic		Third party(ies)	
Year	No.	%	No.	%	No.	%
2024	18,127	66.12%	8,584	31.31%	704	2.57%

Michigan Gubernatorial election results for Cass County
Year	Republican		Democratic		Third party(ies)	
Year	No.	%	No.	%	No.	%
2022	12,666	62.23%	7,350	36.11%	337	1.66%

The county government operates the jail, maintains rural roads, operates the major local courts, keeps files of deeds and mortgages, maintains vital records, administers public health regulations, and participates with the state in the provision of welfare and other social services. The elected county board of commissioners controls the budget but has only limited authority to make laws or ordinances.

In Michigan, most local government functions — police and fire, building and zoning, tax assessment, street maintenance, etc. — are the responsibility of individual cities and townships.

=== Elected officials ===
- Prosecuting Attorney: Victor Fitz
- Sheriff: Richard J. Behnke
- County Clerk/Register of Deeds: Monica McMichael
- County Treasurer: Hope Anderson
- Drain Commissioner: Jeff VanBelle

(information as of July 2019)

== Education ==
=== Higher Education ===
Cass County is home to Southwestern Michigan College. The college is a public two-year institution of higher education, the college is part of the Michigan community college system. The college is the largest employer in Cass County.

=== Libraries ===
Cass County has several library system which operate in the county. The Cass District Library is the largest library in the county, have branch located in 4 cities around the county. Cass District Library is the library system which services Calvin, Howard, Jefferson, LaGrange, Mason, Milton, Newberg, Ontwa, Penn, Pokagon, Porter and Volinia Townships.

The Dowagiac District Library serves the City of Dowagiac, Wayne Township, and portions of Silver Creek, Keeler, and Bainbridge townships. Marcellus Township also operates their own library apart from the Cass District library to service the residence of the village of Marcellus and the Township of Marcellus.

Southwestern Michigan College operates the Fred Mathews Library on its Campus in Dowagiac.

== Communities ==
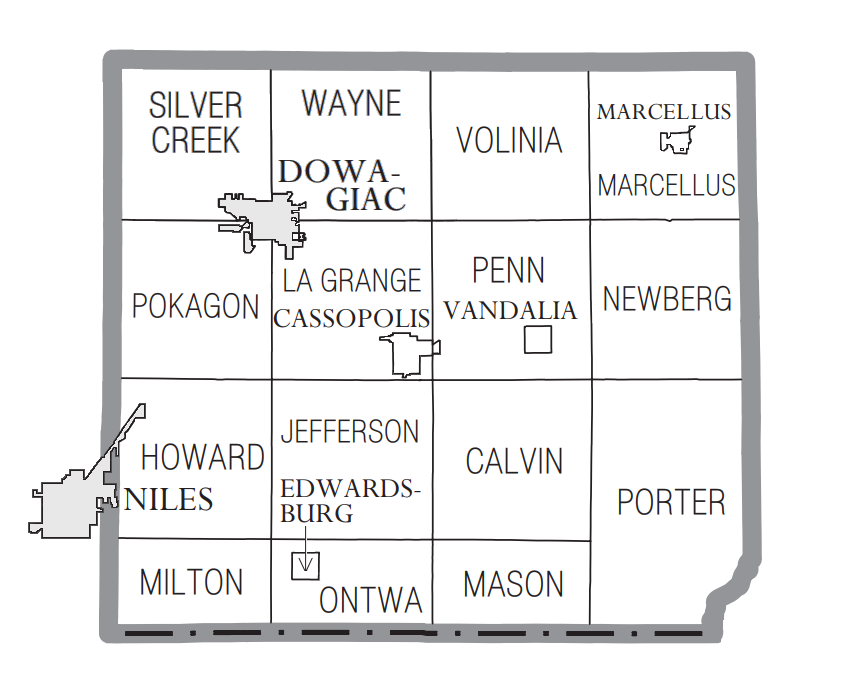
U.S. Census data map showing local municipal boundaries within Cass County. Shaded areas represent incorporated cities.

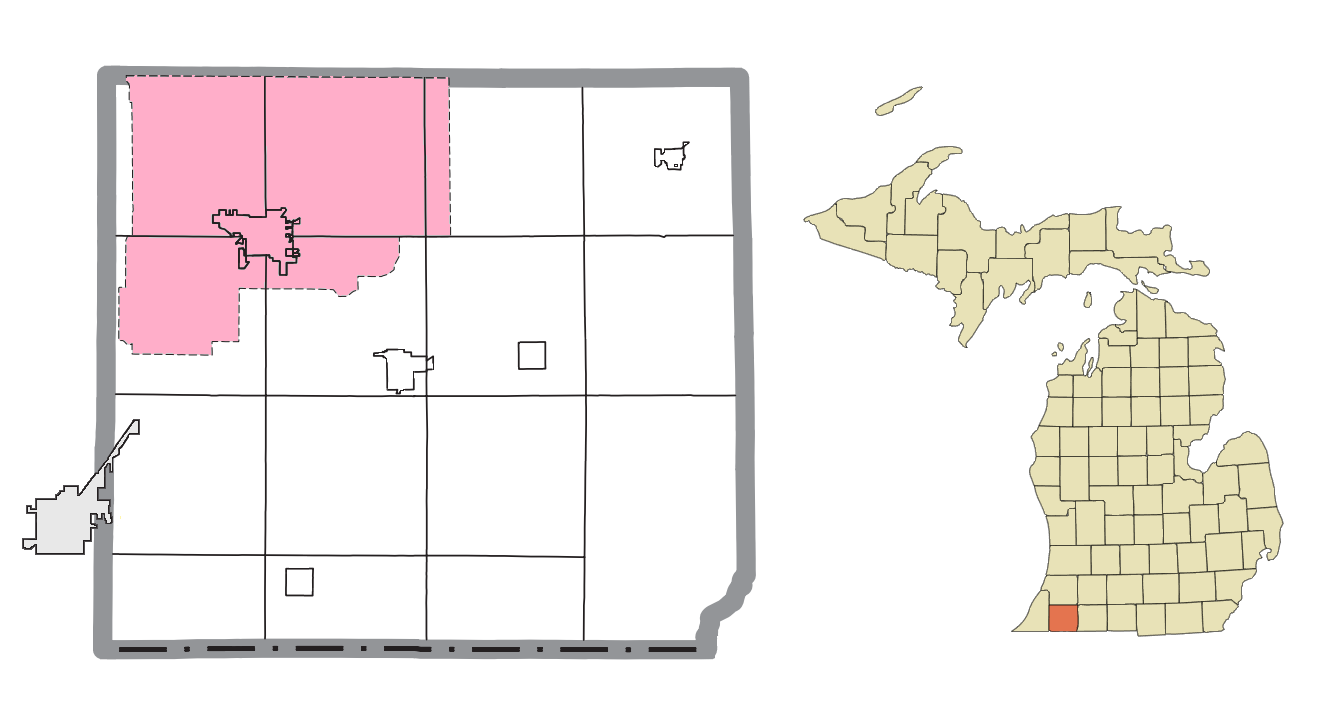
The Pokagon Band of Potawatomi Indians reservation within Cass County with underlying local municipal boundaries

=== Cities ===
- Dowagiac
- Niles (part)

=== Villages ===
- Cassopolis (county seat)
- Edwardsburg
- Marcellus
- Vandalia

=== Civil townships ===
- Calvin Township
- Howard Township
- Jefferson Township
- LaGrange Township
- Marcellus Township
- Mason Township
- Milton Township
- Newberg Township
- Ontwa Township
- Penn Township
- Pokagon Township
- Porter Township
- Silver Creek Township
- Volinia Township
- Wayne Township

=== Unincorporated communities ===
- Adamsville
- Calvin Center
- Charleston
- Corey
- Glenwood
- Jones
- La Grange
- Penn
- Pokagon
- Sumnerville
- Union
- Wakelee

=== Indian reservation ===
- Cass County contains a large reservation of the Pokagon Band of Potawatomi Indians, which also contains territories in Allegan, Berrien, and Van Buren counties, as well as extending south into the state of Indiana. The reservation headquarters are located in the county in the city of Dowagiac and also extends into the townships of Pokagon, LaGrange, Silver Creek, Volinia, and Wayne.

== See also ==
- List of Michigan State Historic Sites in Cass County
- National Register of Historic Places listings in Cass County, Michigan
