= Wayne Township, Michigan =

- Civil township
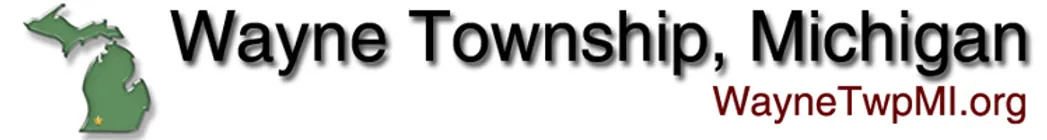
- Logo

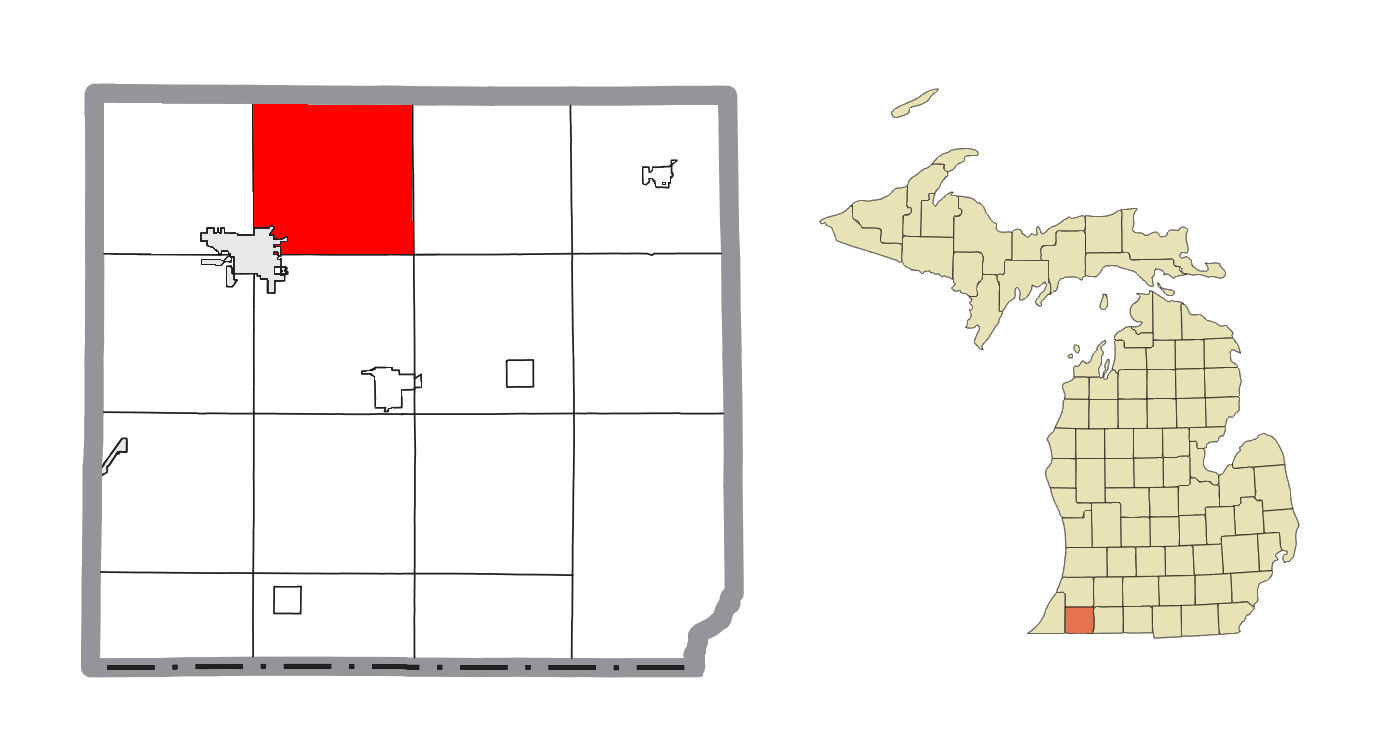
- Location within Cass County

- Location within the state of Michigan Wayne Township (the United States)
- Coordinates: 42°01′39″N 86°02′43″W
- Country: United States
- State: Michigan
- County: Cass

Area
  - Total: 34.8 sq mi (90.2 km^{2})
  - Land: 34.2 sq mi (88.7 km^{2})
  - Water: 0.58 sq mi (1.5 km^{2})
- Elevation: 781 ft (238 m)

Population (2020)
  - Total: 2,576
  - Density: 75.2/sq mi (29.0/km^{2})
- Time zone: UTC-5 (Eastern (EST))
  - Summer (DST): UTC-4 (EDT)
- Area code: 269
- FIPS code: 26-84920
- GNIS feature ID: 1627233
- Website: www.waynetwpmi.org

Wayne Township is a civil township of Cass County in the U.S. state of Michigan. The population was 2,576 at the 2020 census.

== Geography ==
According to the United States Census Bureau, the township has a total area of 34.8 square miles (90.2 km^{2}), of which 34.2 square miles (88.7 km^{2}) is land and 0.58 square miles (1.5 km^{2}), or 1.62%, is water.

== Communities ==
- Glenwood is an unincorporated community in the northeastern part of the township. It was originally known as "Tietsort's Crossing". When a railroad station was opened here in 1865 it was named "Tietsort's". Shortly afterward a post office under the name of "Model City" was established here. In 1873 it was renamed "Glenwood". It was platted in 1874.

== Demographics ==
Historical population
Census	Pop.	Note	%±
2000	2,861		—
2010	2,654		−7.2%
2020	2,576		−2.9%

As of the census of 2000, there were 2,861 people, 1,007 households, and 777 families residing in the township. The population density was 83.5 inhabitants per square mile (32.2/km^{2}). There were 1,231 housing units at an average density of 35.9 per square mile (13.9/km^{2}). The racial makeup of the township was 92.42% White, 2.10% African American, 1.36% Native American, 0.21% Asian, 2.10% from other races, and 1.82% from two or more races. Hispanic or Latino of any race were 3.64% of the population.

There were 1,007 households, out of which 34.3% had children under the age of 18 living with them, 62.7% were married couples living together, 9.9% had a female householder with no husband present, and 22.8% were non-families. 19.1% of all households were made up of individuals, and 6.4% had someone living alone who was 65 years of age or older. The average household size was 2.72 and the average family size was 3.05.

In the township the population was spread out, with 27.5% under the age of 18, 8.0% from 18 to 24, 28.5% from 25 to 44, 25.7% from 45 to 64, and 10.4% who were 65 years of age or older. The median age was 37 years. For every 100 females, there were 103.9 males. For every 100 females age 18 and over, there were 100.9 males.

The median income for a household in the township was $42,816, and the median income for a family was $42,936. Males had a median income of $36,012 versus $23,973 for females. The per capita income for the township was $17,621. About 6.6% of families and 10.8% of the population were below the poverty line, including 13.7% of those under age 18 and 4.3% of those age 65 or over.
