= Ontwa Township, Michigan =

- Civil township
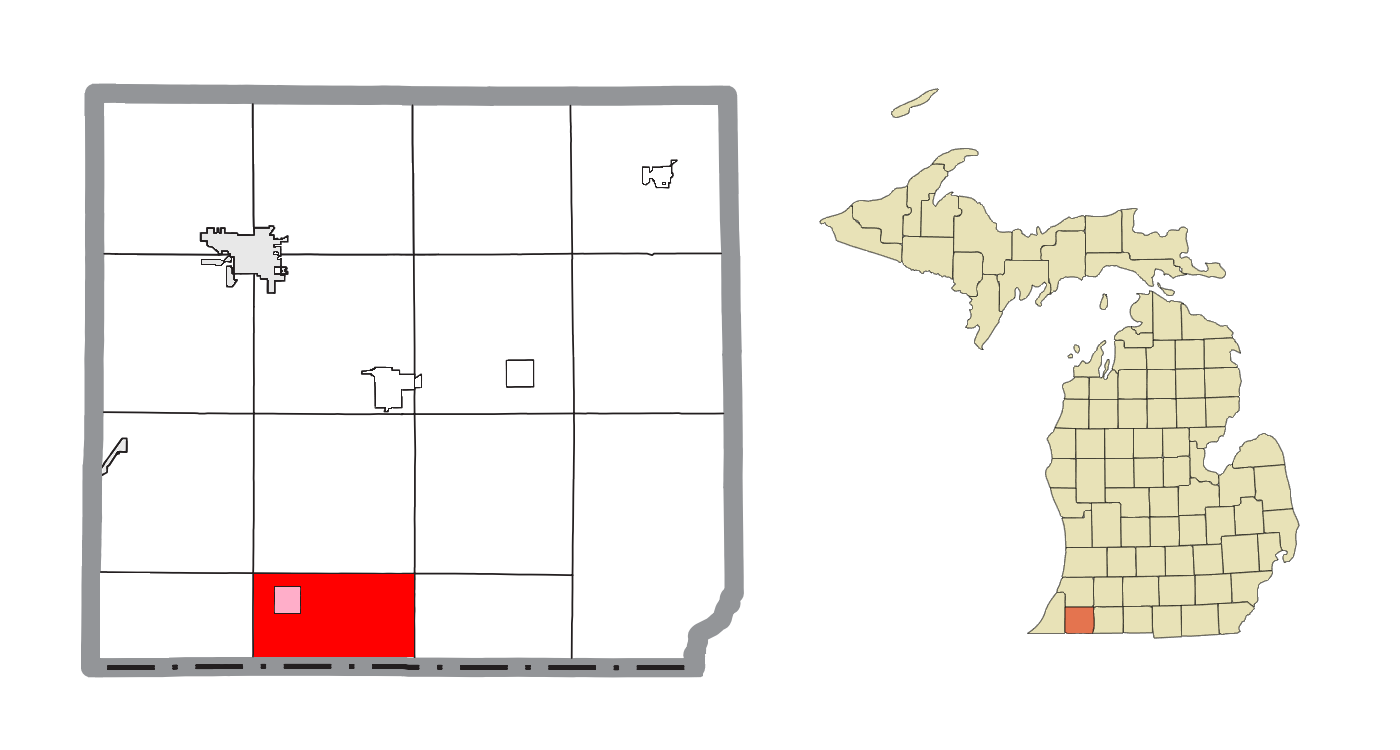
- Location within Cass County (red) and the administered village of Edwardsburg (pink)

- Location within the state of Michigan Ontwa Township (the United States)
- Coordinates: 41°47′45″N 86°03′12″W
- Country: United States
- State: Michigan
- County: Cass

Area
  - Total: 21.0 sq mi (54.4 km^{2})
  - Land: 19.4 sq mi (50.3 km^{2})
  - Water: 1.6 sq mi (4.1 km^{2})
- Elevation: 797 ft (243 m)

Population (2020)
  - Total: 6,904
  - Density: 355/sq mi (137/km^{2})
- Time zone: UTC-5 (Eastern (EST))
  - Summer (DST): UTC-4 (EDT)
- ZIP code(s): 49112, 49113
- Area code: 269
- FIPS code: 26-60900
- GNIS feature ID: 1626852
- Website: Official website

Ontwa Township is a civil township of Cass County in the U.S. state of Michigan. The population was 6,904 at the 2020 census.

== Geography ==
Ontwa Township is located along the southern border of Cass County, which is also the Michigan–Indiana line. The village of Edwardsburg is in the northwest part of the township. The unincorporated community of Granger, Indiana, borders the township to the southwest.

According to the United States Census Bureau, the township has a total area of 21.0 square miles (54.4 km^{2}), of which 19.4 square miles (50.3 km^{2}) is land and 1.6 square miles (4.1 km^{2}), or 7.52%, is water. Several named lakes are in the township, the largest of which are Eagle Lake and Christiana Lake in the northeast. The unincorporated community of Adamsville is near the eastern edge of the township, along Christiana Creek, a south-flowing tributary of the St. Joseph River.

== Demographics ==
Historical population
Census	Pop.	Note	%±
2000	5,865		—
2010	6,549		11.7%
2020	6,904		5.4%

As of the census of 2000, there were 5,865 people, 2,392 households, and 1,683 families residing in the township. The population density was 300.4 inhabitants per square mile (116.0/km^{2}). There were 2,653 housing units at an average density of 135.9 per square mile (52.5/km^{2}). The racial makeup of the township was 96.78% White, 0.31% African American, 0.84% Native American, 0.27% Asian, 0.03% Pacific Islander, 0.26% from other races, and 1.52% from two or more races. Hispanic or Latino of any race were 0.85% of the population.

There were 2,392 households, out of which 30.6% had children under the age of 18 living with them, 56.1% were married couples living together, 9.2% had a female householder with no husband present, and 29.6% were non-families. 24.2% of all households were made up of individuals, and 9.9% had someone living alone who was 65 years of age or older. The average household size was 2.45 and the average family size was 2.88.

In the township the population was spread out, with 24.9% under the age of 18, 6.4% from 18 to 24, 29.4% from 25 to 44, 25.0% from 45 to 64, and 14.4% who were 65 years of age or older. The median age was 39 years. For every 100 females, there were 101.7 males. For every 100 females age 18 and over, there were 99.7 males.

The median income for a household in the township was $43,488, and the median income for a family was $50,364. Males had a median income of $36,601 versus $28,265 for females. The per capita income for the township was $21,691. About 4.5% of families and 5.7% of the population were below the poverty line, including 7.5% of those under age 18 and 4.1% of those age 65 or over.
