= Michigan's 36th House of Representatives district =

American legislative district

Michigan's 36th State House of Representatives district
Representative
Steve Carra; R–Three Rivers
- Demographics: 83.7% White; 2.7% Black; 7.5% Hispanic; 0.7% Asian; 0.2% Native American; 0.7% Other; 4.5% Multiracial
- Population (2024): 89,481

Michigan's 36th House of Representatives district is a legislative district within the Michigan House of Representatives located in the counties of Cass and St. Joseph. The district was created in 1965, when the Michigan Supreme Court ordered the reapportionment of state legislative districts from a county-based system to a proportional one following the Supreme Court case Reynolds v. Sims. It is currently represented by Republican Steve Carra of Three Rivers.

== List of representatives ==
Representative	Party	Years	Residence	Notes
James T. Tierney	Democratic	1965–1972	Garden City	
John F. Markes	Democratic	1973–1976	Westland	
Robert C. Law	Republican	1977–1980	Livonia	Resigned January 1980 after accepting a job in the administration of Governor William Milliken.
Sylvia Skrel	Republican	1980 (Note: Elected in a 1980 special election to replace Rep. Robert C. Law, who resigned.)–1982	Livonia	
Gerald H. Law	Republican	1983–1991	Plymouth	Resigned April 1991 to become Plymouth Township supervisor.
Georgina F. Goss	Republican	1991 (Note: Elected in a 1991 special election to replace Rep. Gerald H. Law, who resigned.)–1992	Northville	
Maxine L. Berman	Democratic	1993–1996	Southfield	Redistricted from the 64th district.
Nancy L. Quarles	Democratic	1997–2002	Southfield	Term limited.
Brian P. Palmer	Republican	2003–2008	Romeo	Redistricted from the 32nd district; term limited.
Peter J. Lund	Republican	2009–2014	Shelby Charter Township	Term limited.
Peter Lucido	Republican	2015–2018	Shelby Charter Township	
Douglas Wozniak	Republican	2019–2021	Shelby Charter Township	Resigned November 2021 after being elected to the Michigan Senate.
Terence Mekoski	Republican	2022 (Note: Elected in a 2022 special election to replace Rep. Douglas Wozniak, who resigned.)	Shelby Charter Township	
Steve Carra	Republican	2023–present	Three Rivers	Redistricted from the 59th district.

== Historical district boundaries ==
Map	Description	Apportionment Plan	Notes
	Wayne County (part): Canton Township; Garden City; Nankin Township (part); Plymouth; Plymouth Township	1964 Apportionment Plan	
	Wayne County (part): Livonia (part); Westland (part)	1972 Apportionment Plan	
	Wayne County (part): Canton Township (part); Northville; Northville Township; Plymouth; Plymouth Township	1982 Apportionment Plan	
	Oakland County (part): Lathrup Village; Southfield	1992 Apportionment Plan	
	Macomb County (part): Bruce Township; Shelby Charter Township; Washington Township	2001 Apportionment Plan	
	Macomb County (part): Bruce Township; Shelby Charter Township (part); Washington Township	2011 Apportionment Plan	
	Cass County (part): Calvin Township; Jefferson Township; LaGrange Township (part); Marcellus Township; Mason Township; Newberg Township; Ontwa Township; Penn Township; Porter Township; Volinia Township; St. Joseph County	2021 Apportionment Plan (Note: Referred to as the Hickory plan.)	

== Recent elections ==
=== 2020s ===
2026 Michigan House of Representatives election
Party	Candidate	Votes	%
Republican	Steve Carra (incumbent)	22,161	63.1
Democratic	Cole Slaski	12,871	36.65
Write-In	Luke Lori	90	0.26
Total votes		35,122	100
Republican hold			

2024 Michigan House of Representatives election
Party	Candidate	Votes	%
Republican	Steve Carra (incumbent)	29,710	68.35
Democratic	Erin L. Schultes	13,758	31.65
Total votes		43,468	100
Republican hold			

2022 Michigan House of Representatives election
Party	Candidate	Votes	%
Republican	Steve Carra	21,589	66.29
Democratic	Roger M. Williams	10,979	33.71
Total votes		32,568	100
Republican hold			

2020 Michigan House of Representatives election
Party	Candidate	Votes	%
Republican	Douglas C. Wozniak (incumbent)	37,945	68.69
Democratic	Robert Murphy	17,299	31.31
Total votes		55,244	100
Republican hold			

=== 2010s ===
2018 Michigan House of Representatives election
Party	Candidate	Votes	%
Republican	Douglas C. Wozniak	26,974	66.3
Democratic	Robert Murphy	12,894	31.7
Libertarian	Benjamin Dryke	807	2.0
Total votes		40,675	100
Republican hold			

2016 Michigan House of Representatives election
Party	Candidate	Votes	%
Republican	Peter Lucido	33,293	71.8
Democratic	Diane Young	13,048	28.2
Total votes		46,341	100
Republican hold			

2014 Michigan House of Representatives election
Party	Candidate	Votes	%
Republican	Peter Lucido	20,845	69.9
Democratic	Robert Murphy	8,965	30.1
Total votes		29,810	100
Republican hold			

2012 Michigan House of Representatives election
Party	Candidate	Votes	%
Republican	Pete Lund	26,870	64.1
Democratic	Robert Murphy	15,024	35.9
Total votes		41,894	100
Republican hold			

2010 Michigan House of Representatives election
Party	Candidate	Votes	%
Republican	Pete Lund	25,552	69.9
Democratic	Robert Murphy	11,025	30.1
Total votes		36,577	100
Republican hold			

2008 Michigan House of Representatives election
Party	Candidate	Votes	%
Republican	Pete Lund	30,753	60.7
Democratic	Robert Murphy	19,904	39.3
Total votes		50,657	100
Republican hold			
