= Calvin =

Calvin may refer to:

== Names ==
- Calvin (given name)
- Calvin (surname)

== Places ==
=== In the United States ===
- Calvin, Arkansas, a hamlet
- Calvin Township, Jewell County, Kansas
- Calvin, Louisiana, a village
- Calvin Township, Michigan
  - Calvin crater, an impact crater
- Calvin, North Dakota, a city
- Calvin, Oklahoma, a town
- Calvin, Virginia
- Calvin, West Virginia, an unincorporated community

=== Elsewhere ===
- Calvin, Ontario, Canada, a township
- Mount Calvin, Victoria Land, Antarctica

== Schools ==
- Calvin University (South Korea), a Presbyterian-affiliated university in South Korea
- Calvin University, Grand Rapids, Michigan
- Calvin Theological Seminary, Grand Rapids, Michigan
- Calvin High School (disambiguation), various American schools
- Calvin Christian School (Escondido, California)
- Calvin Christian School (Kingston, Tasmania)
- Collège Calvin, the oldest public secondary school in Geneva, Switzerland; founded by John Calvin

== Other uses ==
- Hurricane Calvin (disambiguation), various Pacific Ocean cyclones
- Calvin Cycle, a biochemical system involved in production of sugars
- Calvin (horse), an American Thoroughbred racehorse and winner of the 1875 Belmont Stakes
- Susan Calvin, fictional robopsychologist in Isaac Asimov's short stories
- Calvin Company, a defunct educational and industrial film production company
- Calvin (Calvin and Hobbes), a comic strip character
  - Calvin (novel), a novel by Martine Leavitt about a mentally ill teenager's obsession with the comic strip character

== See also ==
- Calvinism
