= Colvin =

Colvin may refer to:

- Colvin (surname)
- Colvin family, the Anglo-Indian administrators and soldiers
- Colvin Mountain, a ridge in Alabama
- Colvin Township, St. Louis County, Minnesota, a township
- Colvin Township, in Eddy County, North Dakota

== See also ==
- Calvin (disambiguation)
