= Michigan's 59th House of Representatives district =

American legislative district

Michigan's 59th State House of Representatives district
Representative
Doug Wozniak; R–Shelby Charter Township
- Demographics: 87.1% White; 1.9% Black; 3.8% Hispanic; 3.5% Asian; 0.1% Native American; 0.2% Hawaiian/Pacific Islander; 0.6% Other; 2.9% Multiracial
- Population (2024): 89,569

Michigan's 59th House of Representatives district (also referred to as Michigan's 59th House district) is a legislative district within the Michigan House of Representatives located in part of Macomb County. The district was created in 1965, when the Michigan House of Representatives district naming scheme changed from a county-based system to a numerical one.

== List of representatives ==
Representative	Party	Dates	Residence	Notes
Charles J. Davis	Republican	1965–1968	Onondaga	Died in office.
Jim N. Brown	Republican	1969–1972	Okemos	Lived in Mason until around 1971.
H. Lynn Jondahl	Democratic	1973–1992	Okemos	Lived in East Lansing until around 1989.
Glenn S. Oxender	Republican	1993–1998	Sturgis	
Cameron S. Brown	Republican	1999–2002	Sturgis	
Rick S. Shaffer	Republican	2003–2008	Three Rivers	
Matt Lori	Republican	2009–2014	Constantine	
Aaron Miller	Republican	2015–2020	Sturgis	
Steve Carra	Republican	2021–2022	Three Rivers	
Doug Wozniak	Republican	2023–present	Shelby Charter Township	
Sylvia Grot	Republican	(Note: Member-elect.)	Shelby Charter Township	

== Recent elections ==
=== 2020s ===
2026 Michigan House of Representatives election
Party	Candidate	Votes	%
Republican	Sylvia Grot	28,528	61.41
Democratic	Jason Robbins	17,927	38.59
Total votes		46,455	100
Republican hold			

2024 Michigan House of Representatives election
Party	Candidate	Votes	%
Republican	Doug Wozniak	38,064	68.6
Democratic	Jason Pulaski	17,439	31.4
Total votes		55,503	100
Republican hold			

2022 Michigan House of Representatives election
Party	Candidate	Votes	%
Republican	Doug Wozniak	28,225	65.2
Democratic	James Diez	15,083	34.8
Total votes		43,338	100
Republican hold			

2020 Michigan House of Representatives election
Party	Candidate	Votes	%
Republican	Steve Carra	26,561	62.8
Democratic	Amy East	14,802	35.0
Republican	Jack Coleman (Write-in)	901	2.1
Republican hold			

2018 Michigan House of Representatives election
Party	Candidate	Votes	%
Republican	Aaron Miller	20,922	66.3
Democratic	Dennis B. Smith	10,656	33.8
Total votes		31,578	100
Republican hold			

2016 Michigan House of Representatives election
Party	Candidate	Votes	%
Republican	Aaron Miller	24,342	66.8
Democratic	Carol Higgins	12,117	33.2
Total votes		36,459	100
Republican hold			

2014 Michigan House of Representatives election
Party	Candidate	Votes	%
Republican	Aaron Miller	14,141	62.3
Democratic	Mike Moroz	8,574	37.8
Total votes		22,715	100
Republican hold			

2012 Michigan House of Representatives election
Party	Candidate	Votes	%
Republican	Matt Lori	22,510	62.3
Democratic	Mike Moroz	13,640	37.7
Total votes		36,150	100
Republican hold			

2010 Michigan House of Representatives election
Party	Candidate	Votes	%
Republican	Matt Lori	17,603	72
Democratic	Carol Higgins	6,846	28
Total votes		24,449	100
Republican hold			

2008 Michigan House of Representatives election
Party	Candidate	Votes	%
Republican	Matt Lori	23,826	59.9
Democratic	Carol Higgins	15,977	40.1
Total votes		39,803	100
Republican hold			

== Historical district boundaries ==
Map	Description	Apportionment Plan	Notes
	Ingham County (part): Bunker Hill Township; East Lansing (part); Ingham Township; Leroy Township; Leslie Township; Locke Township; Mason; Meridian Township; Onondaga Township; Stockbridge Township; Vevay Township; Wheatfield Township; White Oak Township; Williamston; Williamstown Township; Jackson County (part): Springport Township; Tompkins Township	1964 Apportionment Plan	
	Ingham County (part): East Lansing; Lansing (part); Lansing Township (part); Meridian Township; Williamstown Township (part)	1972 Apportionment Plan	
	Ingham County (part): East Lansing; Locke Township; Meridian Township; Wheatfield Township; Williamston; Williamstown Township	1982 Apportionment Plan	
	Cass County (part): Calvin Township; Howard Township; Jefferson Township; Marcellus Township; Mason Township; Milton Township; Newberg Township; Niles; Ontwa Township; Penn Township; Porter Township; St. Joseph County	1992 Apportionment Plan	
	Cass County (part): Calvin Township; Jefferson Township; La Grange Township (part); Marcellus Township; Mason Township; Milton Township; Newberg Township; Penn Township; Pokagon Township; Porter Township; Volinia Township; St. Joseph County	2001 Apportionment Plan	
	Cass County (part): Calvin Township; Dowagiac; Jefferson Township; La Grange Township; Marcellus Township; Mason Township; Newberg Township; Penn Township; Pokagon Township; Porter Township; Volinia Township; Wayne Township; St. Joseph County	2011 Apportionment Plan	
