= Terence Mekoski =

American politician

Member of the Michigan House of Representatives from the 36th district
- In office May 9, 2022 – January 1, 2023
- Preceded by: Douglas Wozniak
- Succeeded by: Steve Carra (redistricting)

Personal details
- Born: Detroit, Michigan
- Party: Republican
- Spouse: Anna Mekoski
- Children: 4
- Education: Macomb Community College (AA)
- Committees: Judiciary, Local Government, and Regulatory Reform
- Website: https://www.mekoski.com

Terence H. Mekoski is an American politician who served as a member of the Michigan House of Representatives for the 36th district. He assumed office after a May 2022 special election.

== Education ==
Mekoski earned an associate degree in liberal arts and science from Macomb Community College and attended Northwestern University. He is studying toward a Bachelor of Science in criminal justice and police science at Columbia Southern University.

== Career ==
From 1982 to 1984, Mekoski worked as a detention officer in the Detroit Police Department. He served as a police officer in Detroit from 1985 to 1990. Mekoski joined the Oakland County Sheriff's Office in 1990 and served as a deputy until 1998, a sergeant from 1998 to 2012, a lieutenant in 2012 and 2013, and deputy commissioner of patrol services from 2013 to 2016. From 2016 to 2018, he served as a regulator agent for the Michigan Gaming Control Board. Since 2018, he has served as a senior financial investigator in the Drug Enforcement Administration In 2022, Mekoski was elected to the office of State Representative, representing Michigan's 36th legislative district in the Michigan House of Representatives.

=== Michigan House of Representatives ===
Mekoski was elected to the Michigan House of Representatives in May 2022, succeeding Doug Wozniak, who was elected to the Michigan Senate. During his campaign, Mekoski called for a forensic audit of Michigan's 2020 presidential election results. After redistricting, Mekoski faced Wozniak in the August 2022 Republican primary for Michigans's 59th district. He placed second in the primary.

=== Macomb County Sheriff Election ===
Mekoski kicked off his campaign to run for Macomb County Sheriff on March 6, 2024. Mekoski is running in the Republican primary election for the office of Macomb County Sheriff.

Mekoski's top campaign priorities include:

1. Uphold Our United States Constitution and Protect Your Rights
2. Attack the Opioid and Fentanyl Epidemic in Our Neighborhoods
3. Inform and Protect our Senior Citizens from Scams and Fraud
4. Bring Awareness and Address Macomb County's Human/Child Sex Trafficking
5. Protect our County Borders/Train & Expand Our Marine Division to Assist
6. Train/Assign More School Liaison Officers to Protect our Children

== Personal ==
Mekoski and his wife, Anna, reside in Shelby Township a suburb of metro-Detroit in northern Macomb county. Mekoski has four children and 12 grandchildren.
