= Calvin Christian School =

Calvin Christian School may refer to:

- Calvin Christian School (Kingston, Tasmania)
- Calvin Christian School (Escondido, California)
