= Georgina F. Goss =

American politician

Member of the Michigan House of Representatives from the 36th district
- In office November 5, 1991 – 1992
- Preceded by: Gerald H. Law
- Succeeded by: Maxine Berman

Personal details
- Party: Republican

Georgina F. Goss is a former member of the Michigan House of Representatives.

== Career ==
In 1985, Goss served as the clerk of Northville Township, and later served as supervisor of Northville Township from 1988 to 1989. On August 27, 1991, Goss was elected as a member of the Michigan House of Representatives, where she represented the 36th district, in a special election, filling Gerald H. Law's vacancy in the chamber. Goss ran unopposed in the general election. Goss served until 1992. Goss was a Republican.
