= Callin =

Callin is a surname. Notable people with the surname include:

- Arnold Callin (1924–2015), Manx politician
- Grant Callin (born 1941), American writer

== See also ==
- Calvin (surname)
