= Doug Wozniak =

American politician

Member of the Michigan House of Representatives from the 59th district
- Incumbent
- Assumed office January 1, 2023
- Preceded by: Steve Carra
- Succeeded by: Sylvia Grot (elect)

Member of the Michigan Senate from the 8th district
- In office November 10, 2021 – January 1, 2023
- Preceded by: Peter Lucido
- Succeeded by: Mallory McMorrow

Member of the Michigan House of Representatives from the 36th district
- In office January 1, 2019 – November 10, 2021
- Preceded by: Peter Lucido
- Succeeded by: Terence Mekoski

Personal details
- Born: January 17, 1947 (age 79) Hamtramck, Michigan
- Party: Republican
- Spouse: Pamela
- Education: University of Michigan; Michigan State University
- Website: Macomb County Real Estate Attorney

Douglas Chester Wozniak (born January 17, 1947) is an American politician serving as a member of the Michigan House of Representatives since 2023, currently representing the 59th district. A member of the Republican Party, he previously represented the 36th district from 2019 to 2021, and served in the Michigan Senate from 2021 to 2023.

== Political career ==
He became a member of the Michigan Senate from the 8th district, after winning a 2021 special election. He served in the position until January 1, 2023. He was previously a member of the Michigan House of Representatives and has represented the 36th district between 2019 and 2021.

In 2022, Wozniak chose to return to the House rather than run for another term in the Senate to avoid facing fellow incumbent Senator Ruth Johnson in a primary, after the two were drawn into the same district in the redistricting process. He won election to the new 59th district. He was reelected in 2024.

Michigan House of Representatives
Preceded by Peter Lucido	Member of the Michigan House of Representatives from the 36th District; 2019–2021	Succeeded by Terence Mekoski
Preceded by Steve Carra	Member of the Michigan House of Representatives from the 59th District; 2023–present	Incumbent
Michigan Senate
Preceded by Peter Lucido	Member of the Michigan Senate from the 8th District; 2021–2023	Succeeded by Mallory McMorrow
