= Nancy L. Quarles =

American politician (born 1952)

Member of the Michigan House of Representatives from the 36th district
- In office January 1, 1997 – 2002
- Preceded by: Maxine Berman
- Succeeded by: Brian P. Palmer

Personal details
- Born: June 7, 1952 (age 74)
- Party: Democratic
- Spouse: Larry
- Education: University of Detroit; Central Michigan University; Western Michigan University

Nancy L. Quarles (born June 7, 1952) is a Michigan politician.

== Early life ==
Quarles was born on June 7, 1952.

== Education ==
Quarles earned a B.S. in business administration from University of Detroit and an M.A. in public administrations from Central Michigan University. In 2001, earned a PhD in the public administration from Western Michigan University.

== Career ==
Quarles served on the Oakland County Board of Commissioners from 1995 to 1996. On November 5, 1996, Quarles was elected to the Michigan House of Representatives where she represented the 36th district from January 1, 1997, to 2002. Quarles was again elected to the Oakland County Board of Commissioners in November 2010, and currently serves on this board. Quarles also currently works as a professor at Central Michigan University.

== Personal life ==
Quarles resides in Southfield, Michigan and is married to Larry.
