= Weesaw =

Weesaw (c. 1785 – September 1836) was a war chief of the Potawatomi. He and his band were associated with the location that later came to be known as Gard's Prairie in Volinia Township, Michigan. He was the son of Anaquiba. He was married to Sinegogua Topinabee, a daughter of Topinabee. He was a signer of the 1821 Treaty of Chicago that ceded to the United States most of the Potawatami holdings in Michigan, with the exception of a small section of Berrien County and a square-mile tract adjacent to Niles, Michigan.

Weesaw was described as tall, majestic, and fond of ornaments, such as a large silver amulet. He, Pokagon, and Shavehead were the principal sub-chiefs under Topinabee.

== Sources ==
- History of Weesaw Township
