= Charles J. Davis =

American politician (1910–1968)

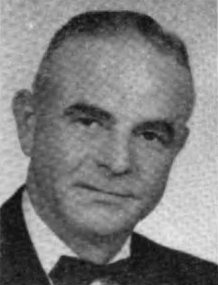

Member of the Michigan House of Representatives from the 59th district
- In office January 1, 1965 – 1968
- Preceded by: District established
- Succeeded by: Jim N. Brown

Member of the Michigan House of Representatives from the Ingham County 2nd district
- In office March 19, 1962 – December 31, 1965
- Preceded by: Ralph H. Young
- Succeeded by: District abolished

Personal details
- Born: December 29, 1910 Eaton County, Michigan, US
- Died: October 1, 1968 (aged 57) Michigan, US
- Party: Republican
- Spouse: Lenore Douglas
- Children: 3
- Education: Olivet College; Michigan State University
- Occupation: Farmer, Politician

Charles Jennings Davis (December 29, 1910 – October 1, 1968) was an American politician who served on the Michigan House of Representatives from 1962 to 1968.

== Early life ==
Davis was born on December 29, 1910, in Eaton County, Michigan to parents Charles A. and Mable Davis. Davis graduated Mason High School.

== Personal life ==
Davis was a Baptist. Davis married Lenore Douglas, and together they had two children. Davis was a member of Knights of Pythias and Phi Kappa Phi.

== Career ==
Davis was a delegate to Michigan state constitutional convention from Ingham County 2nd District from 1961 to 1962, when Davis resigned. On March 19, 1962, Davis was sworn in to the Michigan House of Representatives from Ingham County 2nd District. On January 13, 1965, Davis was sworn in as the first state representative of the 59th district. Davis would serve in this position until 1968.

== Death ==
Davis died on October 1, 1968. Davis was interred at Greenwood Cemetery in Aurelius, Ingham County.
