= Mottville Township, Michigan =

- Township
- Location within the state of Michigan Mottville Township, Michigan (the United States)
- Coordinates: 41°47′22″N 85°43′51″W
- Country: United States
- State: Michigan
- County: St. Joseph

Area
  - Total: 20.0 sq mi (51.7 km^{2})
  - Land: 19.6 sq mi (50.7 km^{2})
  - Water: 0.39 sq mi (1.0 km^{2})
- Elevation: 794 ft (242 m)

Population (2020)
  - Total: 1,444
  - Density: 73.8/sq mi (28.5/km^{2})
- Time zone: UTC-5 (Eastern (EST))
  - Summer (DST): UTC-4 (EDT)
- FIPS code: 26-55780
- GNIS feature ID: 1626770

Mottville Township is a civil township of St. Joseph County in the U.S. state of Michigan. The population was 1,444 at the 2020 census. US 12 runs through the township, and M-103 connects it with the Indiana state line.

== Geography ==
According to the United States Census Bureau, the township has a total area of 20.0 square miles (52 km^{2}), of which 19.6 square miles (51 km^{2}) is land and 0.4 square miles (1.0 km^{2}) (1.95%) is water.

== Demographics ==
As of the census of 2000, there were 1,499 people, 570 households, and 421 families residing in the township. The population density was 76.6 inhabitants per square mile (29.6/km^{2}). There were 633 housing units at an average density of 32.3 per square mile (12.5/km^{2}). The racial makeup of the township was 97.13% White, 0.27% African American, 0.73% Native American, 0.07% Asian, 0.33% from other races, and 1.47% from two or more races. Hispanic or Latino of any race were 1.00% of the population.

There were 570 households, out of which 32.6% had children under the age of 18 living with them, 60.9% were married couples living together, 7.7% had a female householder with no husband present, and 26.0% were non-families. 19.5% of all households were made up of individuals, and 6.3% had someone living alone who was 65 years of age or older. The average household size was 2.63 and the average family size was 3.00.

In the township the population was spread out, with 25.9% under the age of 18, 7.9% from 18 to 24, 29.5% from 25 to 44, 25.8% from 45 to 64, and 10.9% who were 65 years of age or older. The median age was 37 years. For every 100 females, there were 102.8 males. For every 100 females age 18 and over, there were 100.5 males.

The median income for a household in the township was $43,421, and the median income for a family was $44,706. Males had a median income of $33,500 versus $25,458 for females. The per capita income for the township was $17,917. About 7.3% of families and 10.0% of the population were below the poverty line, including 14.6% of those under age 18 and 5.5% of those age 65 or over.

== Notable people ==
- Harvey Freeman, pitcher for the Philadelphia Athletics in 1921
- Shavehead, 19th-century Potawatomi chief

== Points of interest ==
- Mottville Speedway, a 1/4-mile (0.40 km) asphalt oval race track.
- US 12–St. Joseph River Bridge, a 270-foot-long (82 m), reinforced concrete, camelback-arch bridge composed of three 90-foot-long (27 m) and 22-foot-wide (6.7 m) spans resting on concrete piers and abutments over the St. Joseph River.
