= Lincoln Road–Pine River Bridge =

- U.S. National Register of Historic Places
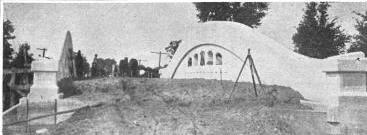
- Bridge undergoing testing after construction

- Location within Michigan Location within the United States
- Interactive map
- Nearest city: Seville, Michigan
- Coordinates: 43°22′45″N 84°49′59″W
- Area: less than one acre
- Built: 1922
- Built by: Walter Willets
- Architect: Michigan State Highway Dept.
- Architectural style: Arched through girder bridge
- MPS: Highway Bridges of Michigan MPS
- NRHP reference No.: 99001516
- Added to NRHP: December 9, 1999

The Lincoln Road–Pine River Bridge, also known as the Riverdale Bridge, was a bridge located on Lincoln Road over the Pine River near Seville, Michigan. The architect behind the Lincoln Road–Pine River Bridge was the Michigan State Highway Department and its builder was Walter Willets. The bridge is notable for being a large early example of an arched through girder bridge in Michigan, and for sitting on substantially skewed abutments. It was listed on the National Register of Historic Places in 1999.

== History ==
The Michigan State Highway Department first designed an arched through girder bridge in 1921, and built the first of them over the River Raisin at Tecumseh. Later versions of the design followed; among the earliest was this bridge over the Pine River. The bridge was constructed for the M-46 trunkline and designated number 291402. In October 1921 the state contracted Walter Willets to construct the bridge. The bridge was completed the following year at a total cost of $18,186.15.

The bridge eventually suffered from severe spalling, and in 2009 it was demolished and replaced.

== Description ==
The 1922 Lincoln Road–Pine River Bridge had a single main span stretching 90 feet (27 m). The bridge was 26 feet (7.9 m) wide with a roadway width of 20 feet (6.1 m). It was constructed using two arched concrete through girders which sat on brackets projecting from concrete abutments. Twelve concrete floor beams ran between the girders to support the roadway. The sides of the bridge featured recessed panels and five arched cutouts. The bridge served in essentially unaltered condition until it was demolished.
