= Concrete curved-chord through girder bridge =

Type of concrete bridge

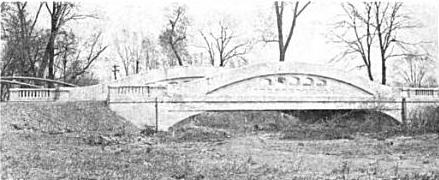
The first camelback bridge in Michigan over the Raisin River near Tecumseh

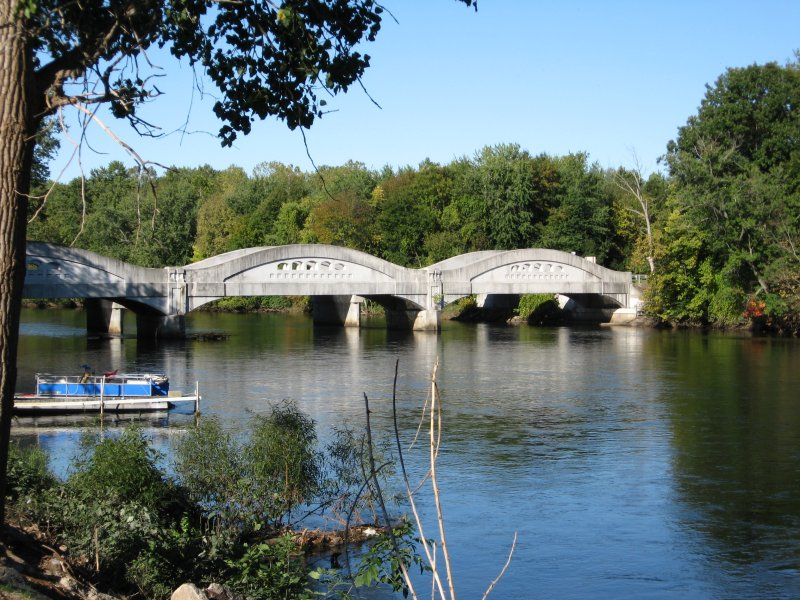
The three-span US 12–St. Joseph River Bridge in Mottville, Michigan, the longest remaining camelback bridge in the state

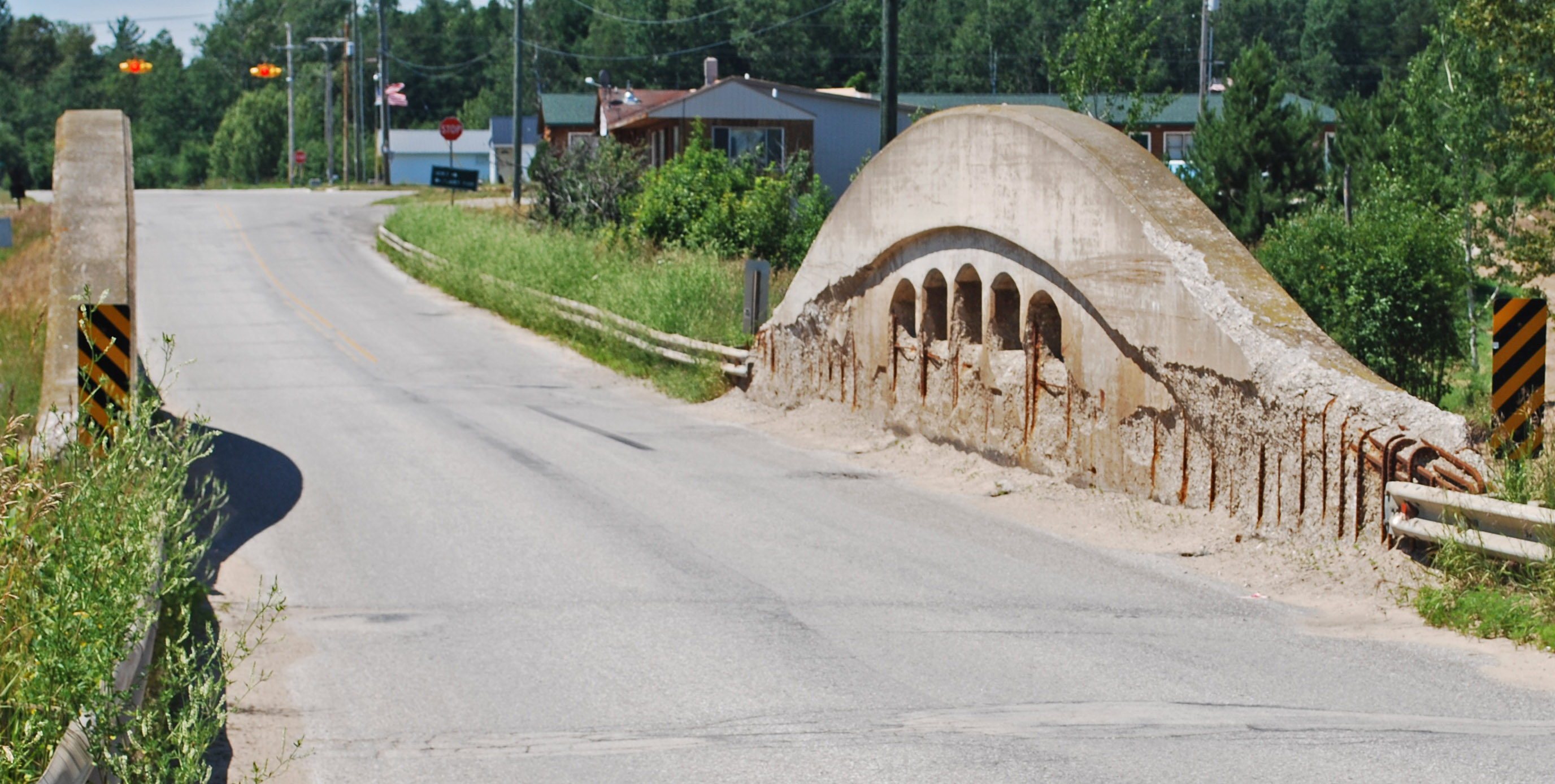
Looking down the length of the Ten Curves Road–Manistique River Bridge

A concrete curved-chord through girder bridge, sometimes known as a camelback bridge, (Note: The term 'camelback' is more commonly applied to a steel Parker truss with five segments.) is a type of concrete bridge most common in the U.S. state of Michigan and the Canadian province of Ontario. C.V. Dewart, the first professional bridge engineer of the Michigan State Highway Department, designed the type. By the early 1920s, the Michigan State Highway Department had produced standardized designs for these bridges in lengths of 50, 60, 70, 75 and 90 feet. The first such bridge in Michigan was built in 1922 over the Raisin River at Tecumseh. By the end of the decade, the design fell out of favor since it could not be widened to handle increasing traffic.

As of 2012, the longest surviving example in Michigan is the three-span, 270-foot-long (82 m) US 12–St. Joseph River Bridge, built in 1922 in Mottville.

== List of bridges ==
- 23 Mile Road–Kalamazoo River Bridge
- Avery Road–Galien River Bridge
- Lincoln Road–Pine River Bridge
- Second Street–Gun River Bridge
- Ten Curves Road–Manistique River Bridge
- Thornapple River Drive Bridge
- US 12–St. Joseph River Bridge
- Wadhams Road–Pine River Bridge
- Vernier Street–Swan Creek Bridge
- Cleveland St.-Crockery Creek Bridge
