= US 12–St. Joseph River Bridge =

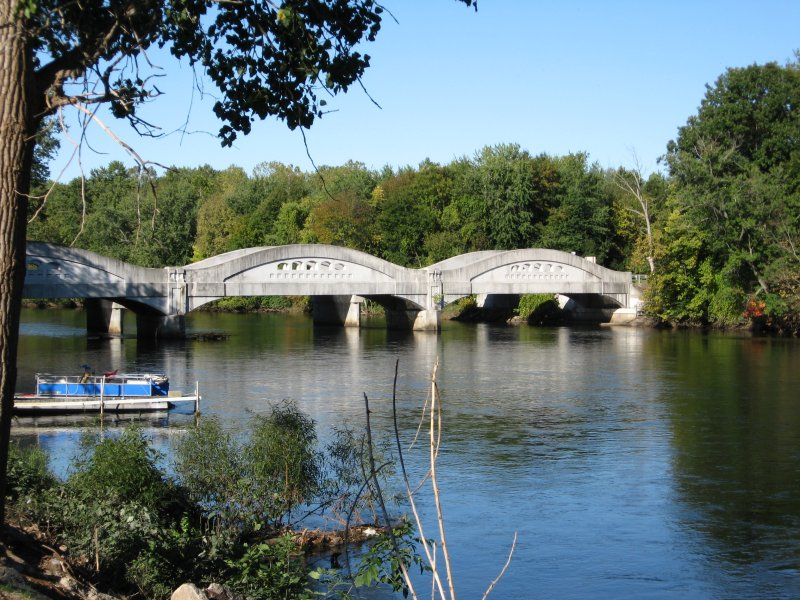
- The bridge's three spans
- Coordinates: 41.8000°N 85.7569°W
- Carries: Pedestrians
- Crosses: St. Joseph River
- Locale: Mottville, Michigan
- Other name: Mottville Bridge

Characteristics
- Total length: 270 ft (82 m)
- No. of spans: 3
- US 12–St. Joseph River Bridge
- U.S. National Register of Historic Places
- Michigan State Historic Site
- Location within Michigan Location within the United States
- Coordinates: 41.8000°N 85.7569°W
- Built: 1922
- NRHP reference No.: 91000388

Significant dates
- Added to NRHP: April 5, 1991
- Designated MSHS: April 10, 1986

Location
- Interactive map of US 12–St. Joseph River Bridge

The US 12–St. Joseph River Bridge is a three-span camelback bridge in Mottville, Michigan, that carried U.S. Route 12 across the St. Joseph River. Built in 1922, it is the fourth bridge to cross the river at this location. It has served as a pedestrian bridge since 1990 when a new bridge opened alongside to carry the highway. The bridge is the longest surviving camelback bridge in Michigan. It is a Michigan State Historic Site and is listed on the National Register of Historic Places.

== History ==
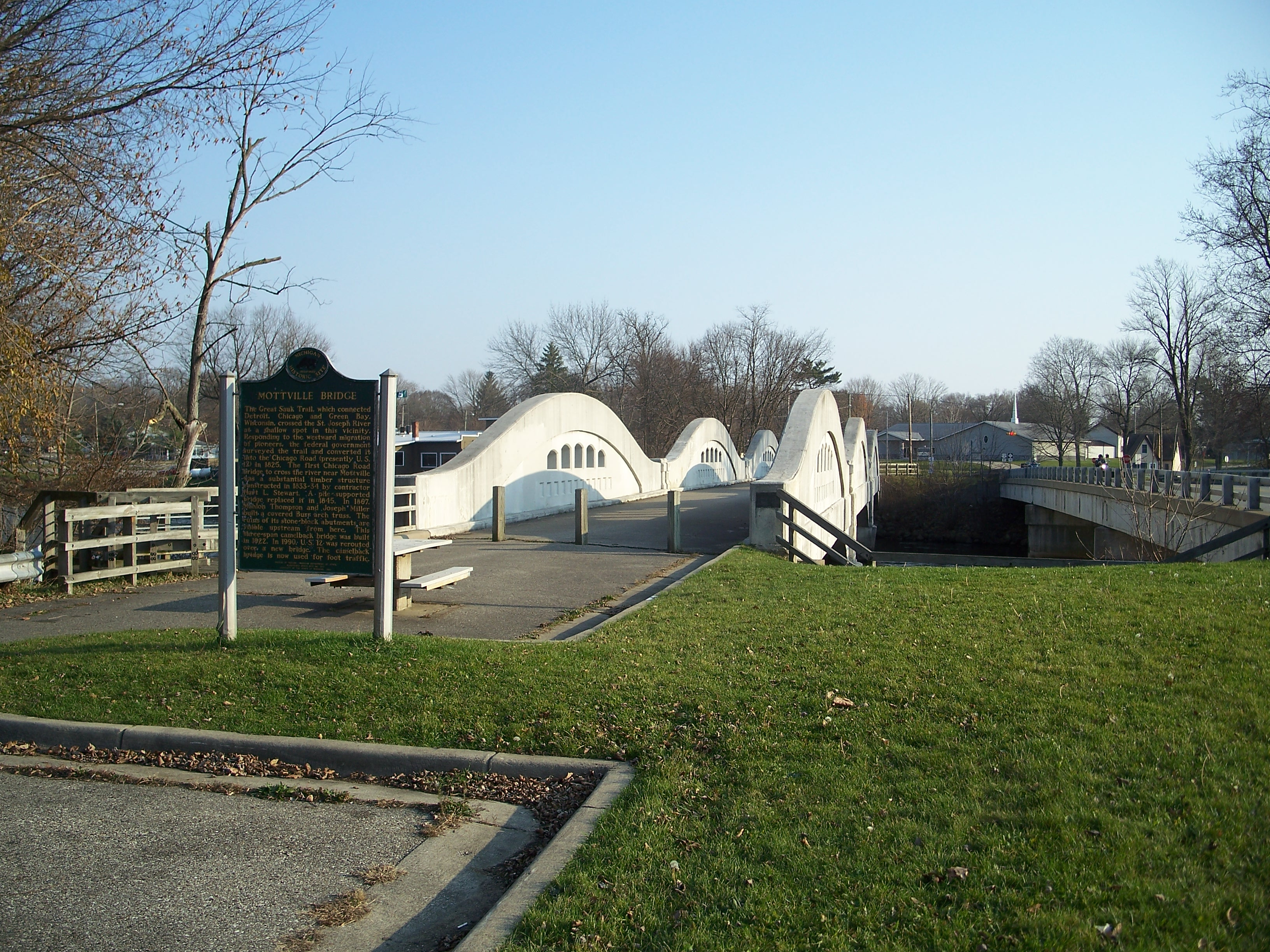
The bridge and its Michigan State Historic Site marker

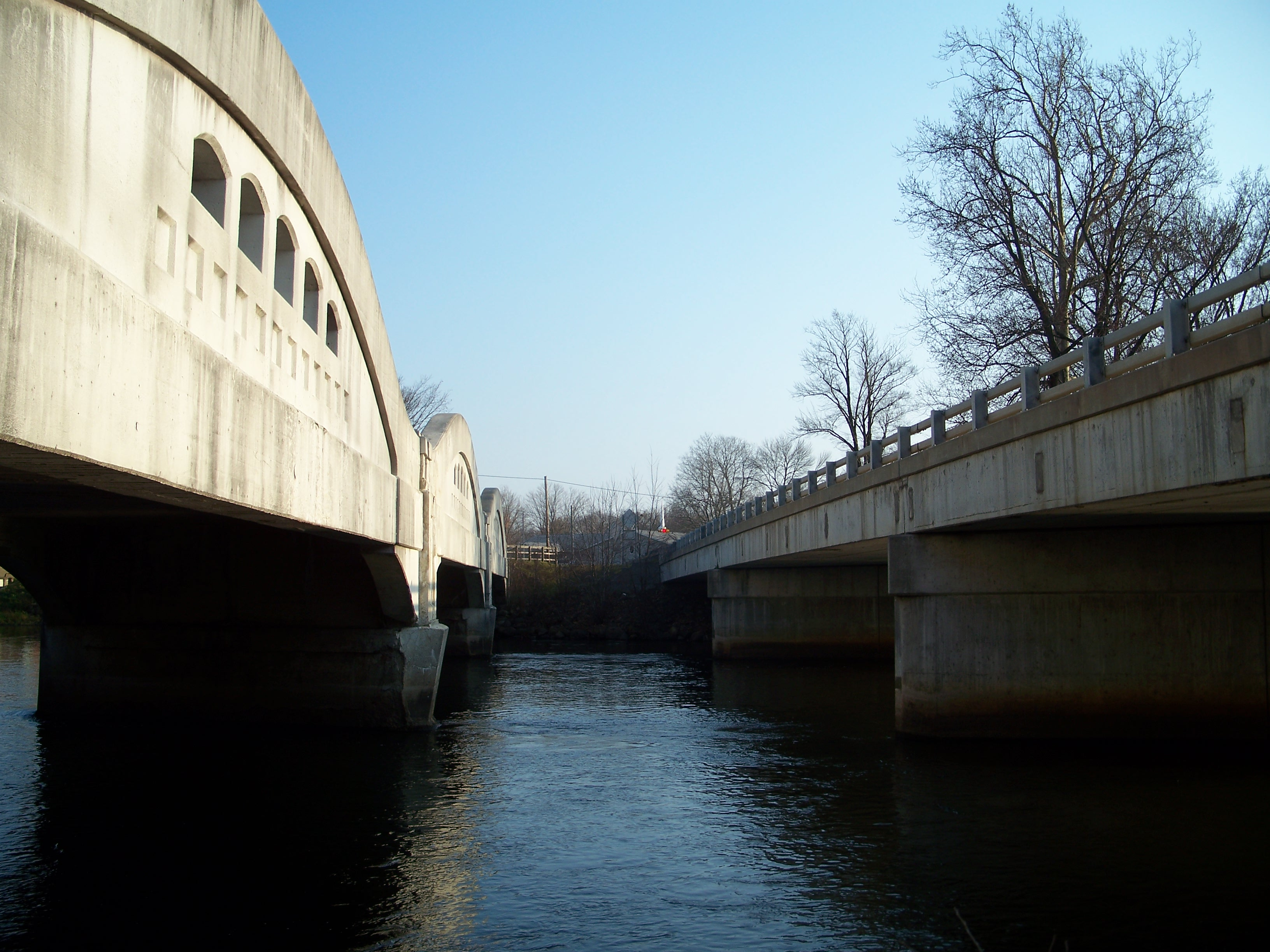
The bridge (left) and its replacement (right)

The US 12–St. Joseph River Bridge is the fourth bridge to cross the St. Joseph river in this vicinity. The Great Sauk Trail crossed the river at a shallow spot near the modern crossing. In 1825, the trail was surveyed and converted by the federal government into the Chicago Road, which presently is US 12. The first bridge to carry this road was a timber structure built from 1833 through 1834. Its replacement, a pile-supported bridge, was built in 1845. A covered Burr arch truss was then built in 1867, of which the ruins of its abutments remain. The former covered bridge (285 feet [87 m] long and 25 feet [7.6 m] wide) was sold at auctions to Ray Berger, a farmer who used the wood to build a barn in 1927. The camelback bridge was constructed in 1922, with Smith and Nichols of Hastings, Michigan, as contractor.

The bridge was designated a Michigan State Historic Site on April 10, 1986, and an informational marker was erected on October 31, 1989. In 1990, the bridge was relegated to pedestrian traffic when a new bridge adjacent to the historic span opened to carry US 12. Instead of demolishing the structure, the Michigan Department of Transportation preserved it as an engineering landmark. On April 5, 1991, the bridge was added to the National Register of Historic Places.

== Design ==
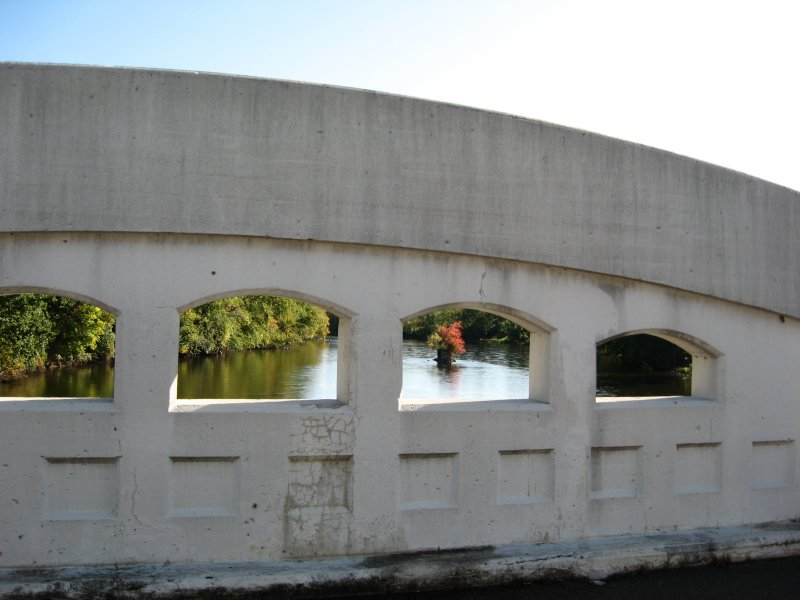
Closeup of the decorative openings and recesses

The bridge was built from standardized plans developed by the Michigan State Highway Department by the early 1920s. It is located at the western edge of the Village of Mottville. At 270 feet (82 m) in length, it is the longest surviving camelback bridge in Michigan. It consists of three identical, 90-foot (27 m) spans built of reinforced concrete, supported by concrete piers and abutments. Reinforced steel girders form its arches. Each arch has five openings above a row of recesses for decorative effect.

== See also ==
- List of bridges on the National Register of Historic Places in Michigan
- National Register of Historic Places listings in St. Joseph County, Michigan
- List of Michigan State Historic Sites in St. Joseph County
