= Matt Lori =

American politician

Member of the Michigan House of Representatives from the 59th district
- In office January 1, 2009 – December 31, 2014
- Preceded by: Rick Shaffer
- Succeeded by: Aaron Miller

St. Joseph County Sheriff
- In office 1989 – December 31, 2008
- Succeeded by: Bradley D. Balk

Personal details
- Born: November 18, 1956 (age 69) Sturgis, Michigan
- Party: Republican
- Spouse: Linda
- Education: Western Michigan University

Matt Lori is a Republican politician from Michigan who formerly served in the Michigan House of Representatives.

A graduate of the FBI National Academy, Lori was the sheriff of St. Joseph County for 20 years before his election to the House.
