= Newton Woods =

Parcel of oak-hickory forest in Cass County, Michigan

- Location within Michigan
- Location: Cass County, Michigan
- Nearest city: Dowagiac
- Coordinates: 42°00′33″N 85°58′16″W
- Area: 40 acres (16 ha)

U.S. National Natural Landmark
- Designated: 1976

Newton Woods is a 40-acre (16 ha) parcel of oak-hickory forest located in Cass County within the U.S. state of Michigan. The Newton tract was listed, in 1976 by the United States Department of the Interior, as a National Natural Landmark.

The woods are located within the 580-acre (2.3 km^{2}) Fred Russ Forest Experiment Station, a Michigan State University (MSU) research forest and Cass County park. The Russ Forest and Park lie where the east–west Marcellus Highway crosses Dowagiac Creek, 8 miles (13 km) east of Dowagiac.

== Ecology ==
Newton Woods is classified by MSU as a "virtually undisturbed, mature oak-hickory forest."

In addition, the larger Fred Russ Forest and Park are noted for their black walnuts and tulip trees. One of the tulip trees has been identified as the largest tree of this type in Michigan, and is claimed to be 180 feet (55 m) tall.

== History ==
Adjacent to the Fred Russ Forest and Park on the east is the site of the now-vanished hamlet of Volinia or Volina, which existed from 1834 until 1902. The hamlet was located where the Marcellus Highway crosses Gards Prairie Road.

The Newton Woods are named after George Newton, who represented Volinia and neighboring communities in the Michigan General Assembly. Newton's Victorian mansion (George Newton House) survives on the Marcellus Highway near the woods, and was named as a registered Michigan historic site in 1974 as Registered Site LO367. A historic marker was erected.
