= Ten Curves Road–Manistique River Bridge =

- U.S. National Register of Historic Places
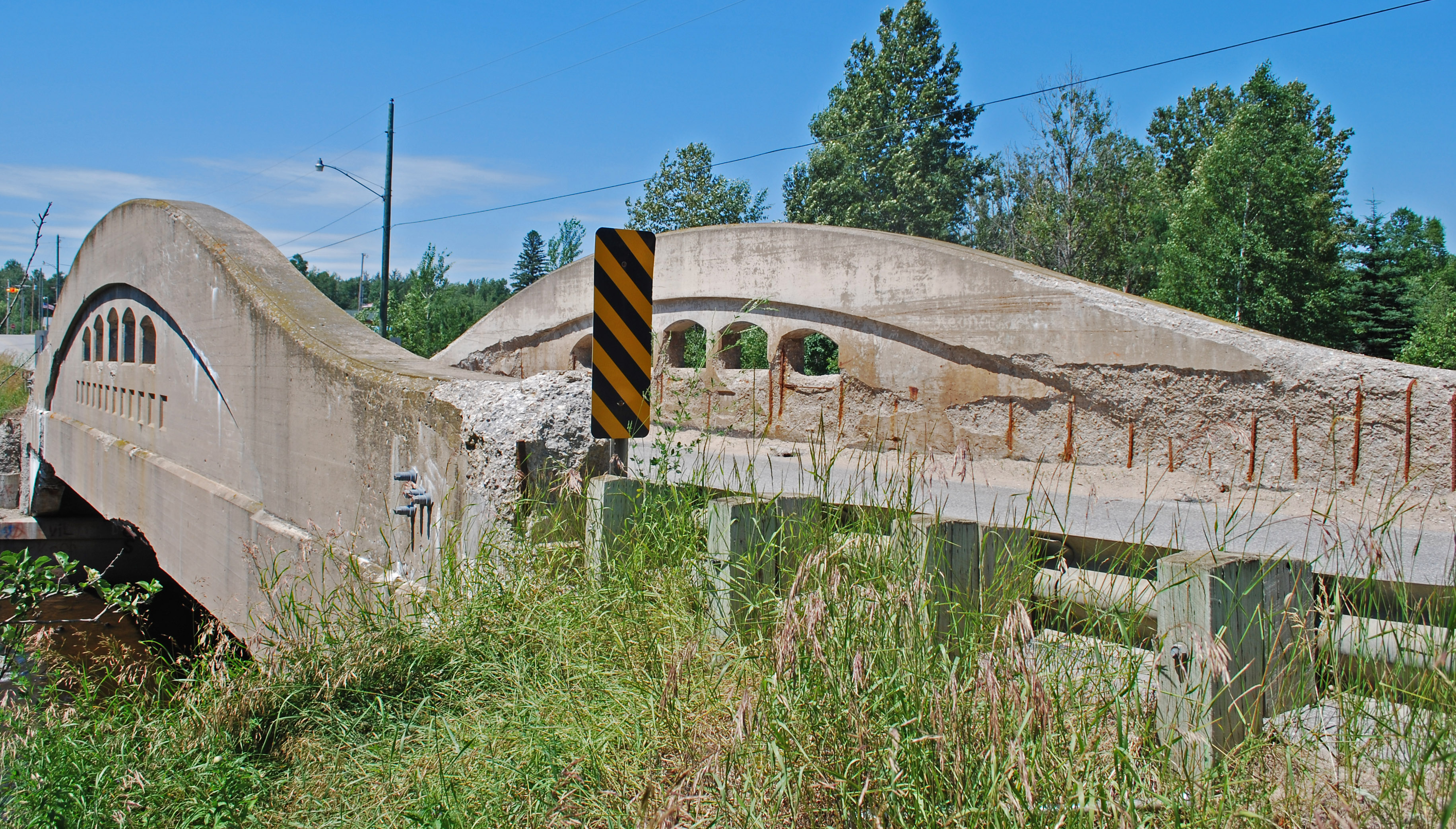
- Side wall of bridge with exposed rebar in 2011

- Location within Michigan Location within the United States
- Interactive map
- Location: Ten Curves Rd. over Manistique R., Germfask Township, Michigan
- Coordinates: 46°14′49″N 85°55′28″W
- Area: less than one acre
- Built: 1923
- Built by: Harry Ericksen
- Architect: Michigan State Highway Department
- Architectural style: through girder
- Demolished: 2013
- MPS: Highway Bridges of Michigan MPS
- NRHP reference No.: 99001538
- Added to NRHP: December 17, 1999

The Ten Curves Road–Manistique River Bridge was a bridge carrying Ten Curves Road over the Manistique River in Germfask Township, Michigan. It was listed on the National Register of Historic Places in 1999, and was demolished in 2013.

== History ==
The Michigan State Highway Department developed standard plans for long-span concrete through girder bridges with arched girders on cantilevered brackets in 1921-22. The first bridge of this type constructed in the state was a 90-foot span in Tecumseh, built in 1922. Another early version of this type of bridge was the 90 foot span, designated Bridge Number 750 02, built in 1923 for the Germfask crossing of the Manistique River.

The Germfask bridge was part of the construction of M-98 between Germfask and the nearby Luce County line. The MSHD awarded Harry Erickson, a contractor from Manistique, the contract to build the bridge. Erickson completed the structure in 1923 for a cost of $26,190.81. The previous trunkline is now downgraded to a county road, but the bridge over the Manistique River remained essentially unaltered until its demolition.

== Description ==
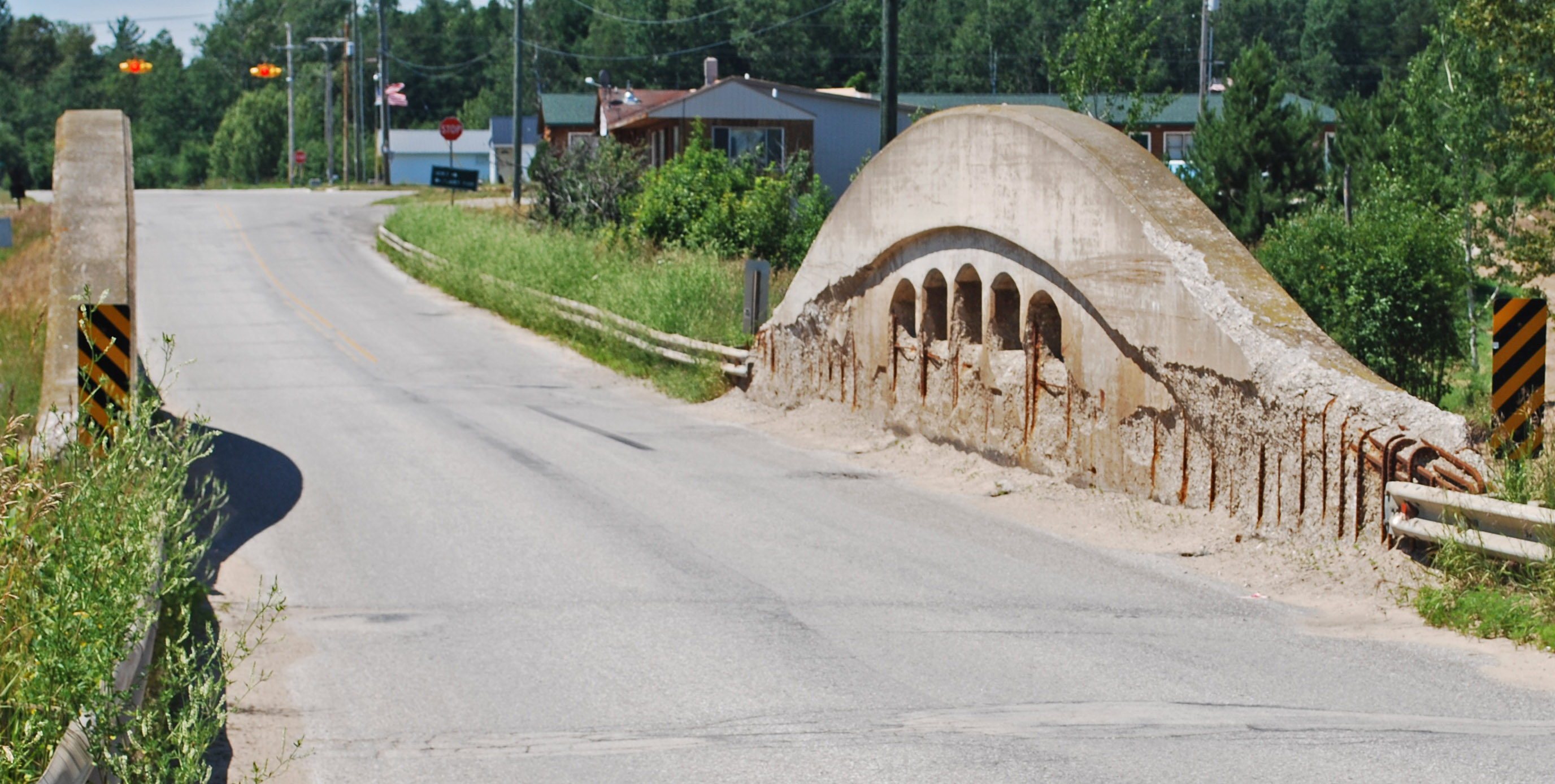
Roadway

The Ten Curves Road–Manistique River Bridge in Germfask consisted of two 90 foot, arched concrete through girders sitting on concrete brackets cantilevered from concrete abutments. The roadway was 22.3 feet wide, with an overall structure width of 25.3 feet. Twelve concrete floor beams, integrally cast into the deck, ran between the main spans. The walls of the bridge were punctured with five small arched cutouts. Guardrails had been installed at each end of the bridge. Prior to the bridge's demolition, the concrete walls of the bridge were severely spalled, but the bridge remained structurally sound.
