= Peter Lucido =

American lawyer and politician

Prosecutor of Macomb County
- Incumbent
- Assumed office January 1, 2021
- Preceded by: Jean Smart

Member of the Michigan Senate from the 8th district
- In office January 1, 2019 – December 31, 2020
- Preceded by: Jack Brandenburg
- Succeeded by: Doug Wozniak

Member of the Michigan House of Representatives from the 36th district
- In office January 1, 2015 – January 1, 2019
- Preceded by: Pete Lund
- Succeeded by: Doug Wozniak

Personal details
- Born: Peter Joseph Lucido; July 31, 1960 (age 66) Detroit, Michigan, U.S.
- Party: Republican
- Spouse: Ann Marie Franzone
- Children: 3
- Education: Macomb Community College; Oakland University (BA); Central Michigan University (MBA); Michigan State University (JD)
- Website: Campaign website

Peter J. Lucido (born July 31, 1960) is an American politician serving as the prosecutor of Macomb County, Michigan, since 2021. A member of the Republican Party, Lucido previously served in the Michigan Senate from 2019 to 2020 (as the Senate Majority Whip), and in the Michigan House of Representatives from 2015 to 2019.

== Political career ==
Lucido's political career started in 2014 with running to succeed the term-limited Pete Lund to represent the 36th district in the Michigan House of Representatives. Lucido's opponent for the Republican nomination was then-Shelby Township Clerk Stan Grot. The race was called the most expensive race for a state House seat in Michigan history. The two candidates spent approximately $350,000 combined with Lucido investing $150,000 of his own money. There were dirty campaign tactics alleged by both sides, with both candidates falsely claiming endorsements from conservative groups. The race's tactics were called a "new low for Macomb politics." Lucido would eventual prevail over Grot by just 103 votes out of the more than 9,400 cast. Lucido would win the general election in the heavily Republican district, defeating Democratic nominee Robert Murphy, taking 70 percent of the vote.

During his 2016 re-election bid, Lucido's opponent Democratic nominee Diane Young filed a complaint with federal and state authorities alleging that Lucido failed to comply with transparency requirements for financial advisors and that he had committed possible campaign finance violations. The Michigan Department of Licensing and Regulatory Affairs and the Michigan Secretary of State both confirmed separate investigations but no official actions were taken against Lucido. Despite the allegations, Lucido was re-elected with 71 percent of the vote.

Lucido decided not to seek a third term in the state House, opting instead to run for the state Senate, seeking the 8th district seat that became vacant by term-limited Republican incumbent Jack Brandenburg. Lucido's only competition for the GOP nominating was former three-term state Rep. Ken Goike. Lucido decisively defeated Goike, taking 72 percent of the vote. Lucido defeated Democratic nominee Paul Francis, taking approximately 62 percent of the vote. Following his election to the State Senate, Lucido was elected majority whip by the Republican Caucus for the 2019-20 legislative session.

=== Macomb County Prosecutor Election ===
After a year-long investigation by the Michigan State Police, FBI and the office of the Michigan Attorney General, then-Macomb County Prosecutor Eric Smith was charged with 10 felonies in Macomb County Circuit Court related to public corruption, including embezzlement. Smith announced his resignation on March 30, 2020, in what was later revealed to be a condition plea negotiations between Smith and federal prosecutors in a separate case.

Smith's resignation threw the race for Macomb County Prosecutor into flux as no candidate had filed to run in the race and Michigan's April 21 deadline for candidates to file to seek a partisan office was just 22 days away at the time of Smith's resignation. Lucido announced his candidacy for the Republican nomination just hours after Smith's resignation was announced. Lucido won the GOP nomination by a wide margin, defeating Richard John Goodman, who served in various roles in Macomb's prosecutor's office for almost for 30 years. His opponent was Democratic nominee Mary Chrzanowski, who had spent 24 years as a circuit court judge in Macomb County. Lucido again outraised his opponent by a massive margin, raising $377,000 to Chrzanowski's $118,000. Lucido criticized Chrzanowski for refusing to debate him with Chrzanowski saying she would not agree to the debate because she said Lucido wanted to choose the debate's moderator saying "...I understood this to mean if Mr. Lucido doesn't get to make the rules, he doesn't want to debate me. In an act of desperation, Mr Lucido is again making up false accusations about me."

Lucido defeated Chrzanowski in the general election with approximately 53 percent of the vote, becoming the first Republican elected to the office since 1944.

== Allegations of sexual misconduct ==
Lucido has been accused of sexual harassment by four different women: journalist Allison Donahue, State Senator Mallory McMorrow, lobbyist Melissa Osborn, and an unnamed employee at his Macomb County government office, where he is Macomb County Prosecutor. He has also been accused of inappropriate touching by Ingham County Judge Lisa McCormick.

In January 2020, Lucido attracted controversy for telling Allison Donahue, a 22-year-old female reporter for the Michigan Advance, that a visiting group of teenage boys from De La Salle Collegiate High School could "have a lot of fun" with her if she were to "hang around" with them. The comment was widely interpreted as an instance of sexual harassment, prompting the Senate Business Office of the State of Michigan to open a sexual harassment investigation against Lucido. The controversy was covered in national and international outlets like The New York Times, Teen Vogue, and the BBC News. Lucido initially agreed that he had made these remarks, apologizing for them but asserting that they were not intended to be disparaging, but later reversed his agreement and alleged that he had been misquoted.

McMorrow stated that Lucido touched her lower back and upper buttocks in November 2018, shortly after she was elected to the state senate, and made comments during a training session that suggested she won her election because of her appearance. Osborn said she was handing out name badges at a lunch for legislators when she felt Lucido's hand on her "lower back/upper butt." She stated that Lucido held his hand there for a long time while complimenting her on her appearance and how the plaid dress she was wearing looked on her. His hand "was placed too low and it was uncomfortable and he just talked about my appearance for an extended period of time, a couple of minutes," Osborn said on "Detroit Today" on WDET-FM. Osborn said, "He was looking me up and down and it was very uncomfortable and demeaning." Osborn stated she decided to come forward because her experience was very similar to that of McMorrow's.

The State Senate investigated the sexual harassment allegations against Lucido. The investigation concluded that Lucido's comments were inappropriate, and as a result Lucido was removed from his committee chairmanship.

Later, Lucido faced renewed controversy over a photo, posted to his own campaign's Facebook page, that shows him with his hand on a woman's behind. Musician Ralphe Armstrong's Facebook page also shared the photo, with a post that said Armstrong and his daughter appeared in the photo with Lucido. Shortly after the photo appeared on Lucido's page, the group Macomb Accountability Project, which opposed Lucido's election, wrote on its Facebook page: "You’d think someone with 4 sexual harassment complaints would watch their hands."

== Personal life ==
Lucido is a licensed attorney and he founded the law firm Lucido & Manzella, P.C. He also founded Macomb Now Magazine. Lucido is Roman Catholic.

Lucido and his wife Ann Marie have three children.

== Electoral history ==
2014 Michigan House of Representatives 36th District Republican Primary
Party	Candidate	Votes	%	±%
Republican	Peter Lucido	4,753	50.6	N/A
Republican	Stan Grot	4,560	49.4	N/A

2014 Michigan House of Representatives 36th District Election
Party	Candidate	Votes	%	±%
Republican	Peter Lucido	20,847	69.9	+5.8
Democratic	Robert Murphy	8,966	30.1	−5.8
Majority		11,881	38.8	+10.6
Turnout		29,813		−2.9
Republican hold				

2016 Michigan House of Representatives 36th District Election
Party	Candidate	Votes	%	±%
Republican	Peter Lucido (Incumbent)	33,293	71.8	+1.9
Democratic	Diane Young	13,048	28.2	−1.9
Majority		20,245	43.6	+4.8
Turnout		46,341		+55.4
Republican hold				

2018 Michigan Senate 8th District Republican Primary
Party	Candidate	Votes	%	±%
Republican	Peter Lucido	24,261	71.7	N/A
Republican	Ken Goike	9,565	28.3	N/A

2018 Michigan Senate 8th District Election
Party	Candidate	Votes	%	±%
Republican	Peter Lucido	76,172	61.8	+0.1
Democratic	Paul Francis	47,154	38.2	−0.1
Majority		29,018	23.6	+0.2
Turnout		123,326		+37.7
Republican hold				

2020 Macomb County Prosecutor Republican Primary
Party	Candidate	Votes	%	±%
Republican	Peter Lucido	65,576	68.3	N/A
Republican	John R. Goodman	30,449	31.7	N/A

2020 Macomb County Prosecutor Election
Party	Candidate	Votes	%	±%
Republican	Peter Lucido	248,426	52.6	+14.2
Democratic	Mary Chrzanowski	224,031	47.4	−14.2
Majority		24,395	5.2	−18.0
Turnout		472,457		+20.6
Swing to Republican from Democratic		Swing		
