= Aaron Miller (politician) =

American politician

Member of the Michigan House of Representatives from the 59th district
- In office January 1, 2015 – January 1, 2021
- Preceded by: Matt Lori
- Succeeded by: Steve Carra

Personal details
- Born: June 14, 1987 (age 39) Sturgis, Michigan, U.S.
- Party: Republican
- Spouse: Alexandria
- Children: 3
- Education: Western Michigan University (BA); Bethel College (MEd)

Aaron Glenn Miller (born June 14, 1987) is an American politician and educator who served as a member of the Michigan House of Representatives from 2015 to 2021.

== Early life and education ==
Miller was born in Sturgis, Michigan. He earned a Bachelor of Arts degree in secondary education and political science from Western Michigan University and a Master of Education from Bethel College.

== Career ==
Before being elected to the Michigan Legislature, Miller worked as a middle and high school mathematics teacher. Miller was elected to the Michigan House of Representatives in November 2014 and assumed office on January 1, 2015. During the 2019–2020 legislative session, Miller served as vice chair of the House Appropriations Committee. He was unable to seek re-election in 2020 due to term limits.

== Personal life ==
Miller is a Follower of Christ, and attends the Grace Christian Fellowship in Sturgis, Michigan.

Political offices
| Preceded by Matt Lori | Michigan Representatives; 59th District; 2015–2021 | Succeeded by Steve Carra |
