= Josh Priebe =

American football player (born 2001)

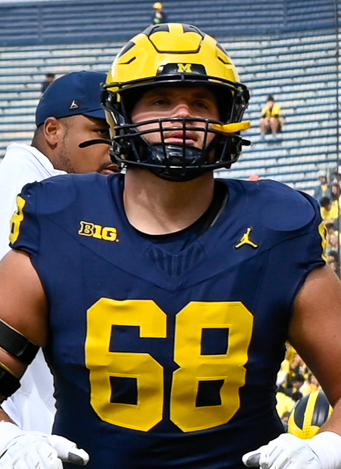
- Priebe with the Michigan Wolverines in 2024

No. 67 – Minnesota Vikings
- Position: Guard
- Roster status: Practice squad

Personal information
- Born: July 30, 2001 (age 25); Niles, Michigan, U.S.
- Listed height: 6 ft 5 in (1.96 m)
- Listed weight: 300 lb (136 kg)

Career information
- High school: Edwardsburg (Edwardsburg, Michigan)
- College: Northwestern (2020–2023); Michigan (2024)
- NFL draft: 2025: undrafted

Career history
- Miami Dolphins (2025–2026)*; Minnesota Vikings (2026–present)*
- * Offseason or practice squad member only

Awards and highlights
- 2× Third-team All-Big Ten (2023, 2024)
- Stats at Pro Football Reference

Joshua Robert Priebe (born July 30, 2001) is an American professional football guard for the Minnesota Vikings of the National Football League (NFL). He played college football for the Northwestern Wildcats and Michigan Wolverines.

== Early life ==
Priebe was born on July 30, 2001, the son of Mark and Angie Priebe, and attended Edwardsburg High School in Edwardsburg, Michigan. He was rated as a three-star recruit and committed to play college football at Northwestern University over offers from Auburn, Ohio State, Miami, Michigan, Michigan State, and Tennessee.

== College career ==
=== Northwestern ===
In 2020, Priebe's COVID-19 shortened freshman season, he played in eight games. In 2021, he started nine games. In 2022 and 2023, Priebe combined to start 20 games. He was named a third-team All-Big Ten selection in 2023. After the 2023 season he entered the NCAA transfer portal.

During his time at Northwestern University, Priebe played in 36 games, making 29 starts for the Wildcats.

=== Michigan ===
In December 2023, Priebe transferred to the University of Michigan for his fifth and final season. He started all 13 games at left guard for the Wolverines in 2024, and was a third-team All-Big Ten selection for a consecutive season.

== Professional career ==
Pre-draft measurables
Height	Weight	Arm length	Hand span	Wingspan	20-yard shuttle	Three-cone drill	Vertical jump	Broad jump	Bench press
6 ft 5 in (1.96 m)	305 lb (138 kg)	32 3/4 in (0.83 m)	9 1/8 in (0.23 m)	6 ft 8 1/2 in (2.04 m)	4.75 s	7.77 s	28.5 in (0.72 m)	9 ft 1 in (2.77 m)	33 reps
All values from Pro Day

=== Miami Dolphins ===
On April 26, 2025, Priebe signed with the Miami Dolphins as an undrafted free agent. On August 26, he was waived by the Dolphins as part of final roster cuts and signed to the practice squad the following day. Priebe signed a reserve/future contract with Miami on January 6, 2026.

On August 31, 2026, Priebe was waived by the Dolphins.

=== Minnesota Vikings ===
On September 30, 2026, Priebe signed to the Minnesota Vikings practice squad.
