= Thornapple River Drive Bridge =

- U.S. National Register of Historic Places
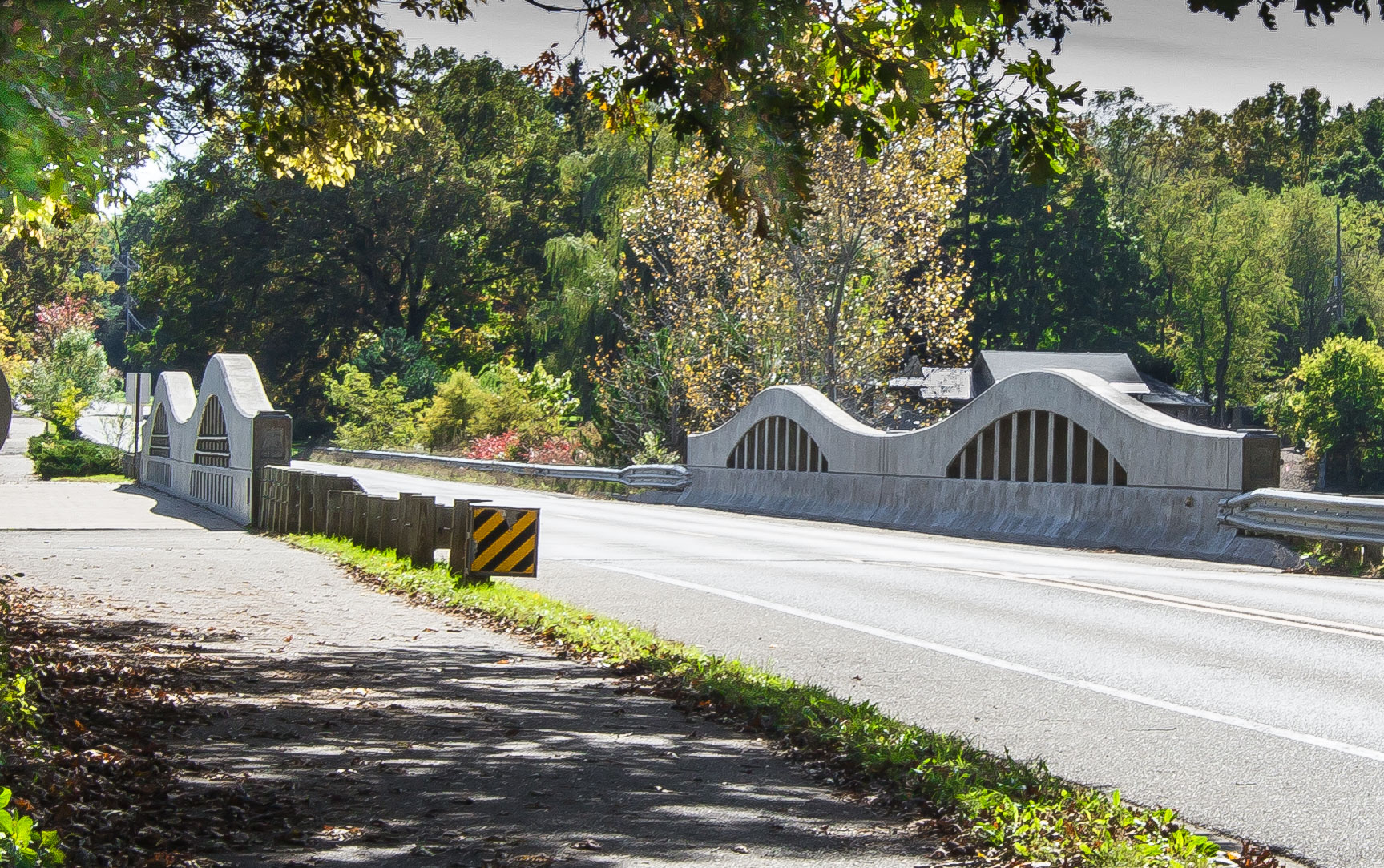
- Interactive map
- Location: Thornapple River Drive over Thornapple River, Cascade Township, Michigan
- Coordinates: 42°56′23″N 85°29′29″W
- Area: less than one acre
- Built: 1927
- Built by: Price Brothers
- Architect: Michigan State Highway Department
- Architectural style: Camelback bridge
- NRHP reference No.: 90000570
- Added to NRHP: April 18, 1990

The Thornapple River Drive Bridge is a road bridge in Cascade Township, Michigan, carrying Thornapple River Drive over the Thornapple River. It was listed on he National Register of Historic Places in 1990.

== History ==
A bridge at this location was first constructed in 1880. This bridge was a covered wooden town lattice structure built by Will Holmes, known as the "Withey Bridge". By the 1920s, this bridge was due to be replaced. In 1927, a new bridge was built, using a standardized design developed by the Michigan State Highway Department ten years earlier. The contractor for the bridge was Price Brothers of Lansing. It continues to support vehicle traffic.

== Description ==
The Thornapple River Drive bridge is a 150-foot-long (46 m) concrete camelback bridge, consisting of two spans, each 75 feet (23 m) long. The bridge is 22 feet (6.7 m) wide and rests on concrete piers and abutments. The bridge supported with concrete reinforced steel girders and has distinctive camelback arches extending above the roadway. Each arch contains five openings occurring above a line of recessed panels.
