= Pete Lund =

American politician (born 1964)

Member of the Michigan House of Representatives from the 36th district
- In office January 2009 – January 2015
- Preceded by: Brian Palmer
- Succeeded by: Peter J. Lucido

Personal details
- Born: March 13, 1964 (age 62) Detroit, Michigan, U.S.
- Party: Republican
- Spouse: Karen Potchynok
- Education: Adrian College (BA); Wayne State University (MBA)

Pete Lund (born March 13, 1964) is a political activist from the U.S. state of Michigan. In 2008, he was elected as a Republican to the Michigan State House of Representatives, taking office in 2009. He represented the 36th District, which is located in Macomb County and consists of the townships, or parts of the townships, of Bruce Township, Shelby Township, and Washington Township.

== Biography ==
Lund received a B.A. in Economics and Political Science from Adrian College and an M.B.A. with an emphasis in Finance from Wayne State University. He is the former owner of Direct Mailers, and taught Public Finance part-time as an adjunct professor at Walsh College of Accountancy and Business.

Prior to his service as a state representative, Lund served as Macomb County Commissioner for eleven years.

In 2008, Lund defeated is general election opponent, Democrat Robert Murphy, 61% to 39% to win a seat in the Michigan State House of Representatives, representing District 36.

On November 14, 2008, Lund was selected to head the House Republican Campaign Review Task Force, a precursor to being selected as Chairman of the House Republican Campaign Committee.

Since 2015, Lund has worked as the Michigan state director for Americans for Prosperity.

Lund resides in Shelby Township with his wife, Karen Potchynok-Lund. He has two daughters.

== Results of 2008 general election ==
2008 Michigan State House election, District 36
Party	Candidate	Votes	%
Republican	Pete Lund	30,753	61%
Democratic	Robert Murphy	19,904	39%

Political offices
Preceded by Brian Palmer	Member of the Michigan House of Representatives from the 36th district 2009–2015	Succeeded by Peter J. Lucido
