= Edwardsburg High School =

Location
- 69410 Section Street; Edwardsburg, Michigan 49112; United States
- Coordinates: 41°47′25″N 86°05′19″W

Information
- Type: Public secondary school
- School district: Edwardsburg Public Schools
- Principal: Ryan Markel
- Teaching staff: 33.59 (on an FTE basis)
- Grades: 9–12
- Enrollment: 782 (2023-2024)
- Student to teacher ratio: 23.28
- Colors: Royal blue and orange
- Athletics conference: Wolverine Conference
- Nickname: Eddies
- Accreditation: Cognia
- Website: ehs.edwardsburgpublicschools.org

Edwardsburg High School is a public high school, serving grades 9–12 in Edwardsburg, Michigan, United States.

== History ==
The name of the school team was changed from the Golden Bears to the Eddies in the early 1940s. The first yearbook was published in 1946 and was called Eddie's Diaries.

== Academics ==
Edwardsburg High School has been accredited by North Central Association (and its successors) since 1972. In the 2019 U.S. News & World Report annual rankings of US high schools, Edwardsburg ranked 7,875th nationally and 274th in Michigan.

== Demographics ==
The demographic breakdown of the 859 students enrolled for 2017-18 was:

- Male - 49.0%
- Female - 51.0%
- Native American/Alaskan - 0.5%
- Asian - 1.4%
- Black - 0.8%
- Hispanic - 3.0%
- Native Hawaiian/Pacific islanders - 0.1%
- White - 91.0%
- Multiracial - 3.2%

27.6% of the students were eligible for free or reduced-cost lunch. For 2017-18, Edwardsburg was a Title I school.

== Athletics ==
The Edwardsburg Eddies are a member of the Wolverine Conference and the MHSAA. The school colors are orange and blue. Sports offered are:

- Baseball (boys)
- Basketball (girls and boys)
- Competitive cheerleading (girls)
- Cross country (girls and boys)
- Football (boys)
  - State champion - 2018
- Golf (girls and boys)
- Soccer (girls and boys)
- Softball (girls)
- Tennis (girls and boys)
- Track (girls and boys)
- Volleyball (girls)
  - State champion - 1977
- Wrestling
- Bowling (girls and boys)
- Competitive Cheer (girls)

== Notable alumni ==
- Becky Breisch - Track and field athlete
- Megan and Liz - Country and pop girl duo
- Josh Priebe - offensive guard for the Miami Dolphins
- Bignatehoops - TikTok creator with 434.4k followers
