= Edwardsburg Public Schools =

School district in Michigan

Edwardsburg Public School District

Address
- 69410 Section Street Edwardsburg, Cass, Michigan, 49112; United States

District information
- Grades: Pre-Kindergarten-12
- Superintendent: Dr. Courtney Szucs
- Schools: 6
- Budget: $31,805,000 2022-2023 expenditures
- NCES District ID: 2612990

Students and staff
- Students: 2,519 (2024-2025)
- Teachers: 132.53 (on an FTE basis) (2024-2025)
- Staff: 276.23 FTE (2024-2025)
- Student–teacher ratio: 19.01 (2024-2025)

Other information
- Website: www.edwardsburgpublicschools.org

Edwardsburg Public School District is a public school district in West Michigan. It serves Edwardsburg, Ontwa Township, and parts of Howard Township, Jefferson Township, Mason Township, and Milton Township in Cass County.

== History ==
The first school in Edwardsburg opened in 1829. A two-story school was built in 1861, and Edwardsburg Consolidated School opened in 1923.

Groundbreaking for Edwardsburg High School, designed by architecture firm Louis C. Kingscott and Associates, was held on February 23, 1960. The school was largely complete by November, 1960 and was dedicated on May 21, 1961.

The junior high school, now known as the middle school, opened in fall of 1970. The Intermediate School opened in fall of 2001.

Before the current high school was built, the high school was located in Edwardsburg Consolidated School, at the southwest corner of Section Street and Main Street on the current high school campus. When the old Consolidated School was torn down around 2003, its entrance arch was retained and a small park built around it.

== Schools ==
Schools in Edwardsburg Public School District
School	Address	Notes
Edwardsburg High School	69358 Section Street, Edwardsburg	Grades 9-12
Edwardsburg Middle School	69230 Section Street, Edwardsburg	Grades 6-8
Edwardsburg Intermediate School	27157 U.S. Route 12, Edwardsburg	Grades 4-5
Eagle Lake School	23889 Avenue C, Edwardsburg	Grades 2-3
Edwardsburg Primary School	69100 Section Street, Edwardsburg	Grades PreK-1
Edwardsburg Alternative Learning Center	69410 Section Street, Edwardsburg	Grades 9-12
