= Second Street–Gun River Bridge =

- U.S. National Register of Historic Places
- Location within Michigan
- Interactive map
- Nearest city: Hooper, Michigan
- Coordinates: 42°30′56″N 85°33′46″W
- Area: less than 1 acre (0.40 ha)
- Built: 1926
- Built by: Yost Brothers; Michigan State Highway Department
- Architectural style: Concrete girder
- MPS: Highway Bridges of Michigan MPS
- NRHP reference No.: 99001573
- Added to NRHP: December 17, 1999

The Second Street–Gun River Bridge was a bridge over the Gun River in Martin Township, Michigan, USA. It was demolished in 2012. The bridge was significant as a rare example of a bridge with a plaque stating that it had been built as a result of Michigan's Covert Act. It was also one of the few remaining examples of a camelback highway bridge in Michigan.

== History ==
The bridge was built in 1926 as part of the Covert Act, which required the state, upon request of the appropriate locality, to construct all trunk-line roads. The Allegan County Road Commission hired the Yost Brothers of Decatur, Indiana, to construct the bridge. The bridge is believed to have been based on a standard Michigan State Highway Department plan for a curved-chord concrete girder bridge. It was listed on the National Register of Historic Places in 1999. The bridge was demolished in 2012 as part of a road improvement project.

== Description ==
The Second Street–Gun River Bridge consisted of a single concrete through-girder span, 48 feet in length. The substructure contained concrete abutments with both T-shaped and flared. The bridge's concrete girders had curved tops with six cast window-like recesses. The deck was 29.3 feet wide, with a 22 feet wide roadway covered with blacktop. The corner posts had squared caps and bases, with four curved concrete brackets at the corner of each girder.
