= Calvin High School =

Calvin High School may refer to:

- Calvin High School (Louisiana) in Calvin, Louisiana
- Calvin High School (North Dakota), a now defunct school in Calvin, North Dakota
- Calvin High School (Oklahoma) in Calvin, Oklahoma

Places with similar names include:

- Calvin Christian High School in Grandville, Michigan
