= M-103 (Michigan highway) =

State highway in St. Joseph County, Michigan, United States

M-103
- M-103 highlighted in red

Route information
- Maintained by MDOT
- Length: 3.055 mi (4.917 km)
- Existed: by 1960–present

Major junctions
- South end: SR 15 near Bristol, Indiana
- North end: US 12 at Mottville

Location
- Country: United States
- State: Michigan
- Counties: St. Joseph

Highway system
- Michigan State Trunkline Highway System; Interstate; US; State; Byways
← M-102	→ M-104

M-103 is a state trunkline highway entirely within St. Joseph County in the southwestern region of the U.S. state of Michigan. The trunkline runs between U.S. Highway 12 (US 12) in Mottville and the Indiana state line along undivided highway near the St. Joseph River. With the connection to State Road 15 (SR 15), it provides access to the Indiana Toll Road. The current highway is the second to carry the number; the first version of M-103 has been incorporated into the routing of US 131.

== Route description ==
M-103 is the continuation of SR 15 in Michigan. It starts at State Line Road which runs along the state line east from M-103. From here north to the terminus in Mottville, M-103 parallels the St. Joseph River running through farmlands. South of town, it runs past the Mottville Township Cemetery. Between John and Water streets, M-103 intersects and ends at US 12. The highway has not been listed on the National Highway System, a system of roads important to the country's economy, defense and mobility.

The Michigan Department of Transportation (MDOT) tracks traffic volumes along the roads it maintains. These volumes are expressed as the average annual daily traffic (AADT), which is a measurement of the number of vehicles on a stretch of roadway for any average day of the year. For the 2008 survey, traffic volume was 3,604 vehicles per day, with 437 commercial vehicles in the tally. In 2009, the numbers increased to 8,252 vehicles total and 1287 commercial vehicles.

== History ==
M-103 was first designated as a state trunkline in 1932. The first version ran from SR 13 at the state line northerly to the junction with US 112 and US 131 in White Pigeon. At the time, US 131 turned westerly along US 112 before turning south to connect with SR 15. This first version of M-103 was completed paved by 1934. The routings of US 131 and M-103 were swapped south of US 12 (successor to US 112) by 1960. Since that time, M-103 has been routed between US 12 and SR 15 in western Mottville Township and US 131 has run due south of White Pigeon to SR 13.

== Major intersections ==
The entire highway is in Mottville Township, St. Joseph County.

mi	km	Destinations	Notes
0.000	0.000	SR 15 south – Bristol	Indiana state line
3.055	4.917	US 12 – Niles, Sturgis	
1.000 mi = 1.609 km; 1.000 km = 0.621 mi
