= Shavehead =

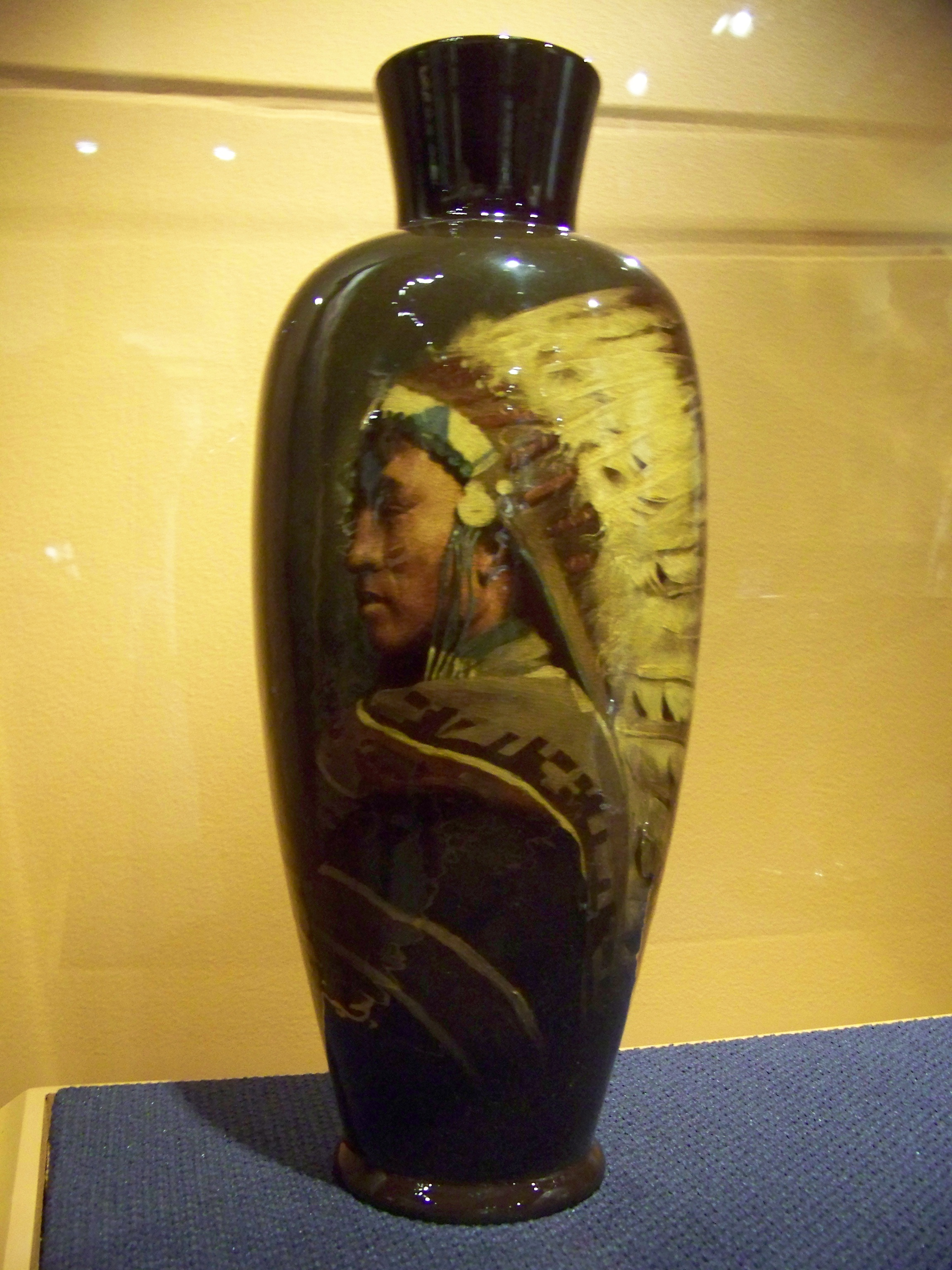
Chief Shavehead (ca. 1899 vase, glazed earthenware, Brooklyn Museum)

Shavehead (born ca. 1800, date of death unknown) was a 19th-century Potawatomi chief.

Shavehead received his name because he shaved the front part of his head, as was the Potawatomi custom. He was not bald, however, having a long braid of hair from the back of his head.

His exact dates of birth and death remain unknown. He was, however, active as a Potawatomi chief and warrior in the first quarter of the 19th century in Cass County, Michigan.

Shavehead had a reputation as a warrior, and was feared both by other Native Americans and whites. He took part in the Battle of Fort Dearborn in Chicago in the War of 1812. Shavehead particularly disliked the incursions of white settlers, and attacked several mail stages on the Chicago Road through southwestern Michigan. Under his direction, the Potawatomis set up a camp at the St. Joseph River near Mottville, Michigan where they collected payment for ferry boats passing through their territory. His handling of those on the mail stages and those on the ferries who did not pay were severe. Shavehead boasted that he owned a string on which hung 99 white men's tongues (although no proof exists of this and this was probably an exaggeration). What is documented is that he showed scalps to white men in an attempt to discourage their entry into Potawatami lands.

Several rumors exist regarding the manner of Shavehead's death. None of them can be proven. One popular tale is that a veteran of the Fort Dearborn Massacre recognized the chief and killed him as the chief was boasting of his role in the battle. Another popular tale is that he was killed by a white hunter whom the chief had befriended.

The most probable story is that he died of old age and was buried in the forests of Cass County.

While the details of his death are thus the subject of legend, what is more substantial is that white settlers severed his head after his death. In 1899, the skull was added to a pioneer collection in Van Buren County, Michigan.

Both Shavehead Lake and Shavehead Prairie near Porter Township, Michigan in Cass County are named after Shavehead.
