= Calvin crater =

Impact crater in the US

- Location within Michigan
- Location: Calvin Township, Michigan, Michigan, US; 41.83°N 85.95°W

Impact crater structure
- Confidence: Confirmed
- Diameter: 8.5 kilometres (5.3 mi)
- Age: 450 ± 10 Ma
- Exposed: No
- Drilled: Yes

Calvin is an impact crater located in Calvin Township, Cass County, in the U.S. state of Michigan. It was discovered in 1987 by Randall Milstein of the Michigan Geological Survey while examining data from about 100 test wells drilled in the area.

It is 8.5 kilometres (5.3 mi) in diameter and the age is estimated to be 450 ± 10 million years (Ordovician). The crater is not exposed to the surface. It lies about 100 to 400 feet (30–120 m) below today's ground level.
