= Colvin Mountain =

Ridge in Alabama, USA

- Location within Alabama

Highest point
- Elevation: 1,322 ft (403 m)
- Coordinates: 33°56′55″N 85°48′31″W

Geography
- Location: Calhoun / Etowah counties, Alabama, US
- Parent range: Appalachian Mountains
- Topo map: USGS Colvin Gap

Colvin Mountain is a ridge in Calhoun County and Etowah County, Alabama, USA.
