= Volinia Township, Michigan =

- Civil township
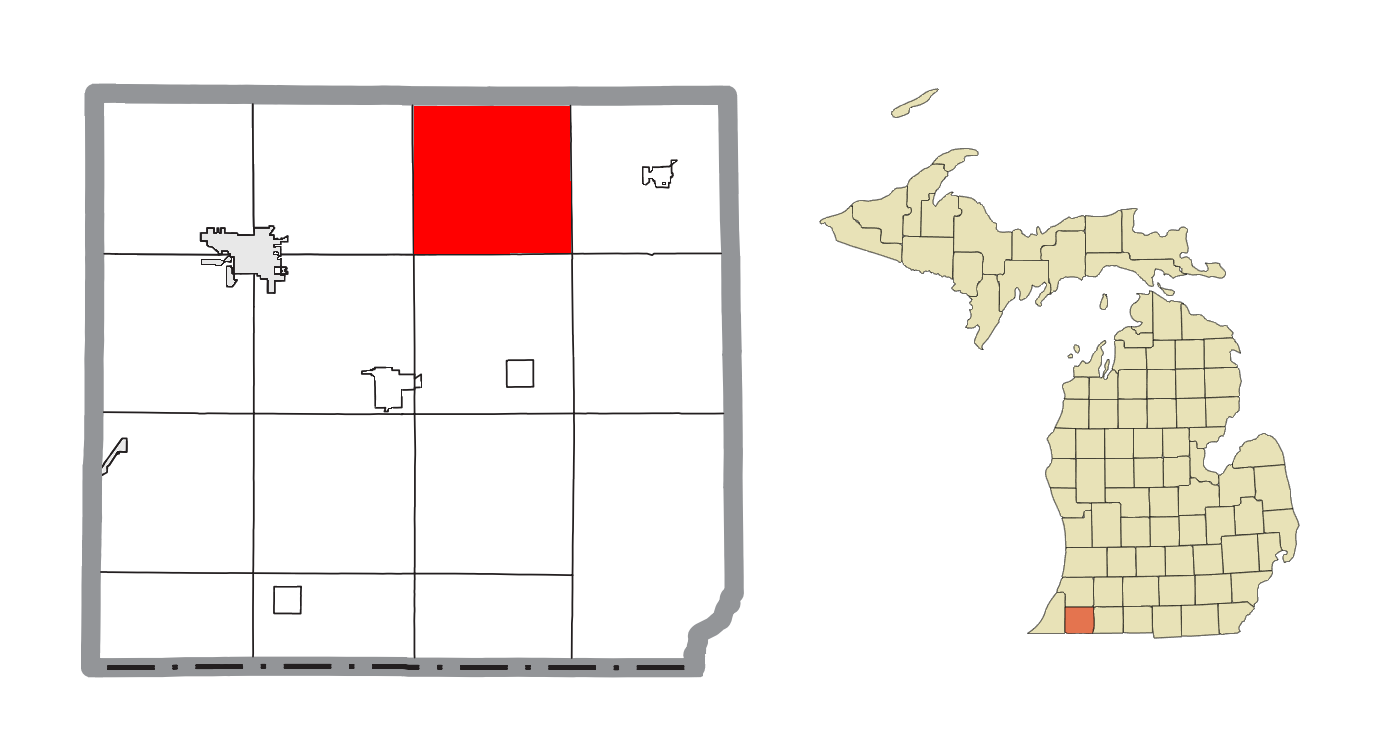
- Location within Cass County

- Location within the state of Michigan Volinia Township (the United States)
- Coordinates: 42°01′23″N 85°56′21″W
- Country: United States
- State: Michigan
- County: Cass

Area
  - Total: 35.1 sq mi (91.0 km^{2})
  - Land: 34.4 sq mi (89.1 km^{2})
  - Water: 0.73 sq mi (1.9 km^{2})
- Elevation: 869 ft (265 m)

Population (2020)
  - Total: 1,096
  - Density: 31.9/sq mi (12.3/km^{2})
- Time zone: UTC-5 (Eastern (EST))
  - Summer (DST): UTC-4 (EDT)
- ZIP code(s): 49031, 49045, 49047, 49067
- Area code: 269
- FIPS code: 26-82580
- GNIS feature ID: 1627203
- Website: https://www.voliniatownship.gov/

Volinia Township is a civil township of Cass County in the U.S. state of Michigan. The population was 1,096 at the 2020 census. When the township was organized in 1833, it was at first named Volhynia, after the province in Poland. It is believed to have been given to honor General Tadeusz Kościuszko, the Polish patriot who helped the United States during the American Revolutionary War. The name was altered first to "Volenia" and then by 1901 or earlier to "Volinia".

The township is the site of Newton Woods, a U.S. National Natural Landmark.

== Communities ==
There are no incorporated municipalities in the township.

- Charleston was a historical settlement in the northern part of the township. It was platted in 1836 by Jacob Morlan, Samuel Fulton, and Jacob Charles (for whom it was named). Elijah Goble built a tavern in 1837, which was an important stop on the stage coach line between Kalamazoo and Niles in the early 1840s. However, when the Michigan Central Railroad was built, the community dwindled. The principal remnant is a cemetery on Dewey Lake Road at 42°03′22″N 85°55′39″W
- Gard's Prairie was the site of a Potawatomie settlement under the leadership of Weesaw in the 1820s.
- Huyckstown was a historical settlement in the northeast part of the township. The settlement was at first known as "Volinia" after the township. It was platted around a store in 1836 and named for John Huyck. A post office named "Little Prairie Ronde" (after the prairie on whose edge it stood) was opened in November 1837. It was renamed "Prairie Ronde" in August 1901 and closed in December 1903. Romig reports that the post office and what was left of the village were moved to Nicholsville, located approximately a half mile to the south.
- Nicholsville was a historical settlement in the northeast part of the township between Finch Lake and Bunker Lake at 42°02′37″N 85°53′46″W. The first sawmill in the county was built here in 1835 by Alexander Copley. Henry George built a grist mill in 1851, and the place was called "Georgetown". He sold his interests to the Nichols brothers for whom the settlement was renamed in 1855. Jonathon Nichols operated a hotel here. The Rose Hill Cemetery nearby has also been known as "Little Prairie Ronde Cemetery" and "Nicholsville Cemetery".
- Volinia was a historical settlement in the township at 42°00′42″N 85°57′17″W. A post office was established in May 1834. The settlement was platted in 1836 by Levi Lawrence, David Hopkins, Obed Bunker and John Shaw. The post office closed in March 1838 and was reestablished in April 1840. In December 1851 the post office was moved and renamed "Pickett's Corners". The post office there closed in July 1862. The post office at Volina was restored in January 1863 and closed in October 1902.
- Wakelee is an unincorporated community in the southeast corner of the township at 41°59′02″N 85°52′44″W (and partially in the adjacent townships of Marcellus, Newberg, and Penn). It was first laid out in 1871 by Levi Garwood, who named it for C. Wakelee, the first treasurer of the Peninsular Railroad Company (later part of Grand Trunk Western Railroad), which built a depot there. A post office opened in January 1872 and operated until November 1939.

The postal delivery areas of some nearby communities also serve the township:

- Cassopolis is a village to the southwest, and the Cassopolis ZIP code 49031 serves southern areas of the township.
- Decatur is a village to the north in Van Buren County, and the Decatur ZIP code 49045 serves areas in the northern part of the township.
- Dowagiac is a city to the west, and the Dowagiac ZIP code 49047 serves areas in the western part of the township.
- Marcellus is a village to the east, and the Marcellus ZIP code 49067 serves areas in the east and central part of the township.

== Geography ==
According to the United States Census Bureau, the township has a total area of 35.1 square miles (91.0 km^{2}), of which 34.4 square miles (89.1 km^{2}) is land and 0.73 square miles (1.9 km^{2}), or 2.07%, is water.

== Demographics ==
Historical population
Census	Pop.	Note	%±
2000	1,174		—
2010	1,112		−5.3%
2020	1,096		−1.4%

As of the census of 2000, there were 1,174 people, 426 households, and 322 families residing in the township. The population density was 34.2 inhabitants per square mile (13.2/km^{2}). There were 588 housing units at an average density of 17.1 per square mile (6.6/km^{2}). The racial makeup of the township was 93.70% White, 2.56% African American, 0.34% Native American, 0.26% Asian, 1.79% from other races, and 1.36% from two or more races. Hispanic or Latino of any race were 3.75% of the population.

There were 426 households, out of which 39.9% had children under the age of 18 living with them, 65.0% were married couples living together, 6.3% had a female householder with no husband present, and 24.4% were non-families. 20.4% of all households were made up of individuals, and 7.0% had someone living alone who was 65 years of age or older. The average household size was 2.75 and the average family size was 3.20.

In the township the population was spread out, with 29.7% under the age of 18, 6.9% from 18 to 24, 29.6% from 25 to 44, 23.1% from 45 to 64, and 10.6% who were 65 years of age or older. The median age was 36 years. For every 100 females, there were 107.4 males. For every 100 females age 18 and over, there were 100.7 males.

The median income for a household in the township was $38,900, and the median income for a family was $40,000. Males had a median income of $30,729 versus $23,077 for females. The per capita income for the township was $17,375. About 3.0% of families and 3.5% of the population were below the poverty line, including 3.2% of those under age 18 and 9.4% of those age 65 or over.
