= Calvin Christian School (Escondido, California) =

Coordinates: 33°9′13.65″N 117°5′24.89″W

Location
- 1868 and 2000 North Broadway; Escondido, California; United States

Information
- School type: Private, Christian school
- Denomination: Calvinism
- Website: CalvinChristianEscondido.org

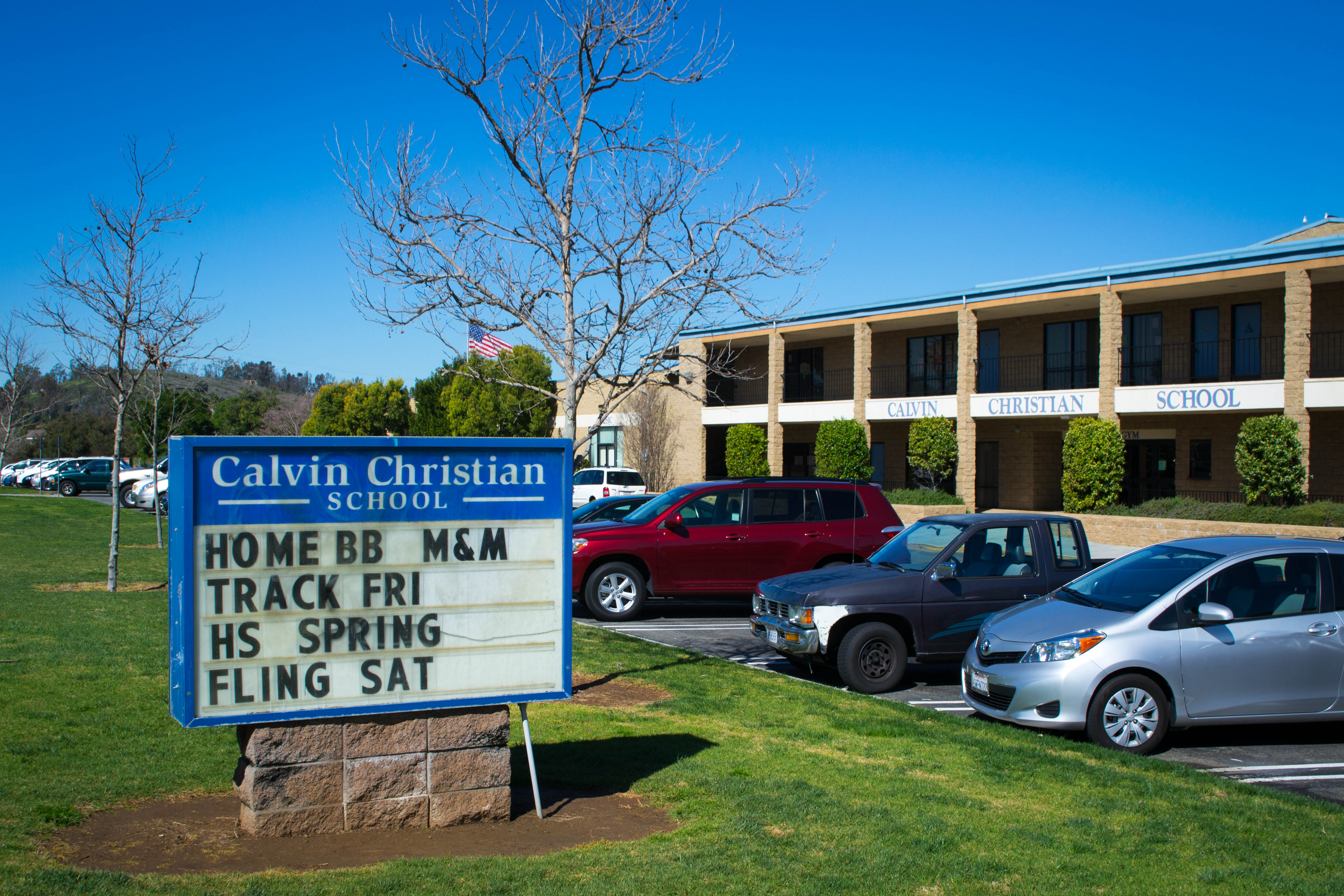
Calvin Christian School in Escondido, California

Calvin Christian School is a private Christian school in Escondido, California. It consists of a preschool, elementary school, junior high, and high school.
