= Jefferson Township, Cass County, Michigan =

Jefferson Township, Michigan
- Civil township
- Seal

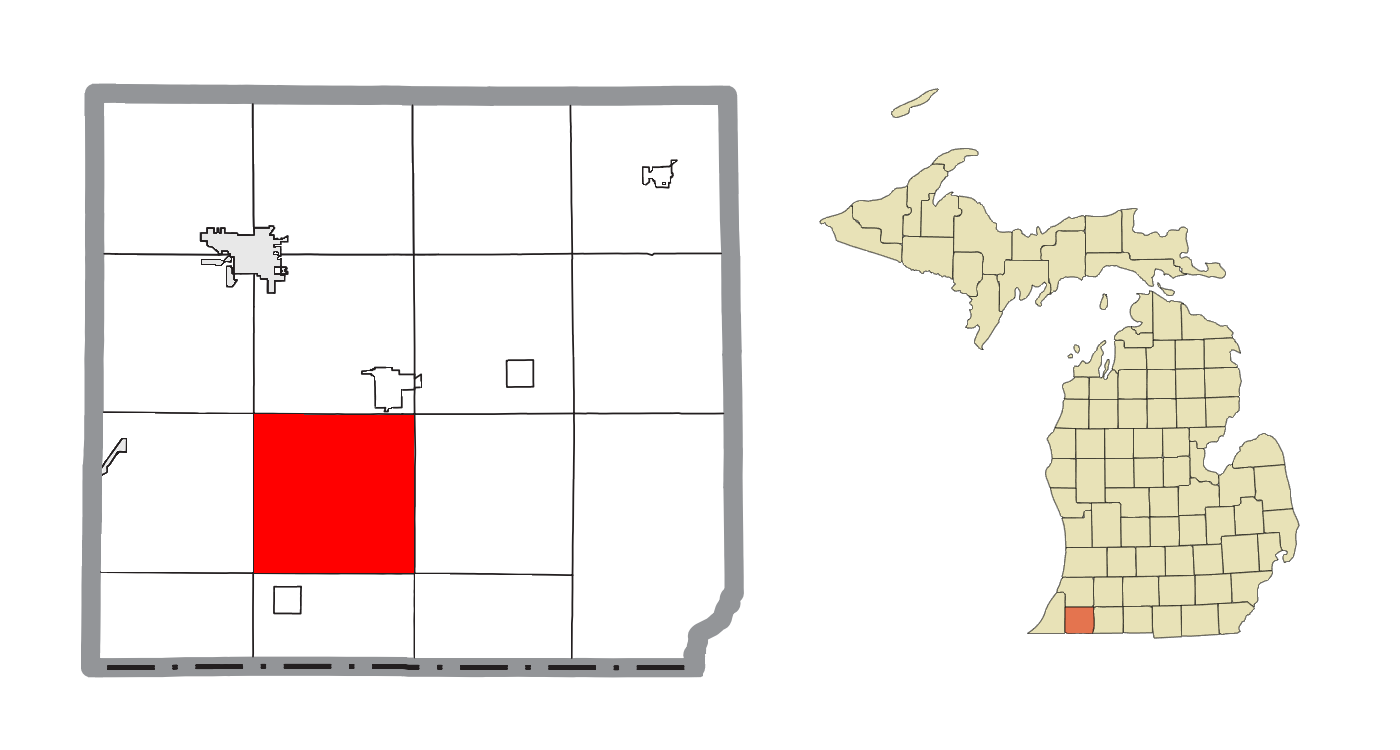
- Location within Cass County

- Location within the state of Michigan Jefferson Township (the United States)
- Coordinates: 41°51′12″N 86°02′50″W
- Country: United States
- State: Michigan
- County: Cass

Area
  - Total: 36.0 sq mi (93.3 km^{2})
  - Land: 34.7 sq mi (90.0 km^{2})
  - Water: 1.3 sq mi (3.3 km^{2})
- Elevation: 869 ft (265 m)

Population (2020)
  - Total: 2,590
  - Density: 74.5/sq mi (28.8/km^{2})
- Time zone: UTC-5 (Eastern (EST))
  - Summer (DST): UTC-4 (EDT)
- ZIP code(s): 49031, 49112
- Area code: 269
- FIPS code: 26-41600
- GNIS feature ID: 1626539
- Website: Official website

Jefferson Township is a civil township of Cass County in the U.S. state of Michigan. The population was 2,590 at the 2020 census.

== Geography ==
According to the United States Census Bureau, the township has a total area of 36.0 square miles (93.3 km^{2}), of which 34.7 square miles (90.0 km^{2}) is land and 1.3 square miles (3.3 km^{2}), or 3.52%, is water.

== Communities ==
- Dailey was an unincorporated community in Jefferson Township. It had a post office starting in 1872.

== Demographics ==
Historical population
Census	Pop.	Note	%±
2000	2,401		—
2010	2,541		5.8%
2020	2,590		1.9%

As of the census of 2000, there were 2,401 people, 872 households, and 645 families residing in the township. The population density was 68.6 inhabitants per square mile (26.5/km^{2}). There were 957 housing units at an average density of 27.3 per square mile (10.5/km^{2}). The racial makeup of the township was 89.55% White, 7.08% African American, 0.83% Native American, 0.25% Asian, 0.42% from other races, and 1.87% from two or more races. Hispanic or Latino of any race were 1.21% of the population.

There were 872 households, out of which 30.3% had children under the age of 18 living with them, 63.0% were married couples living together, 7.1% had a female householder with no husband present, and 26.0% were non-families. 19.6% of all households were made up of individuals, and 7.1% had someone living alone who was 65 years of age or older. The average household size was 2.65 and the average family size was 3.06.

In the township the population was spread out, with 24.1% under the age of 18, 7.1% from 18 to 24, 26.6% from 25 to 44, 27.4% from 45 to 64, and 14.8% who were 65 years of age or older. The median age was 41 years. For every 100 females, there were 100.4 males. For every 100 females age 18 and over, there were 93.9 males.

The median income for a household in the township was $43,633, and the median income for a family was $50,662. Males had a median income of $39,938 versus $25,250 for females. The per capita income for the township was $20,161. About 9.6% of families and 12.2% of the population were below the poverty line, including 18.6% of those under age 18 and 9.0% of those age 65 or over.

== Education ==
Most of Jefferson Township is zoned to Cassopolis Public Schools. Some of it is zoned to Edwardsburg Public Schools.
