= Calvin, North Dakota =

- City
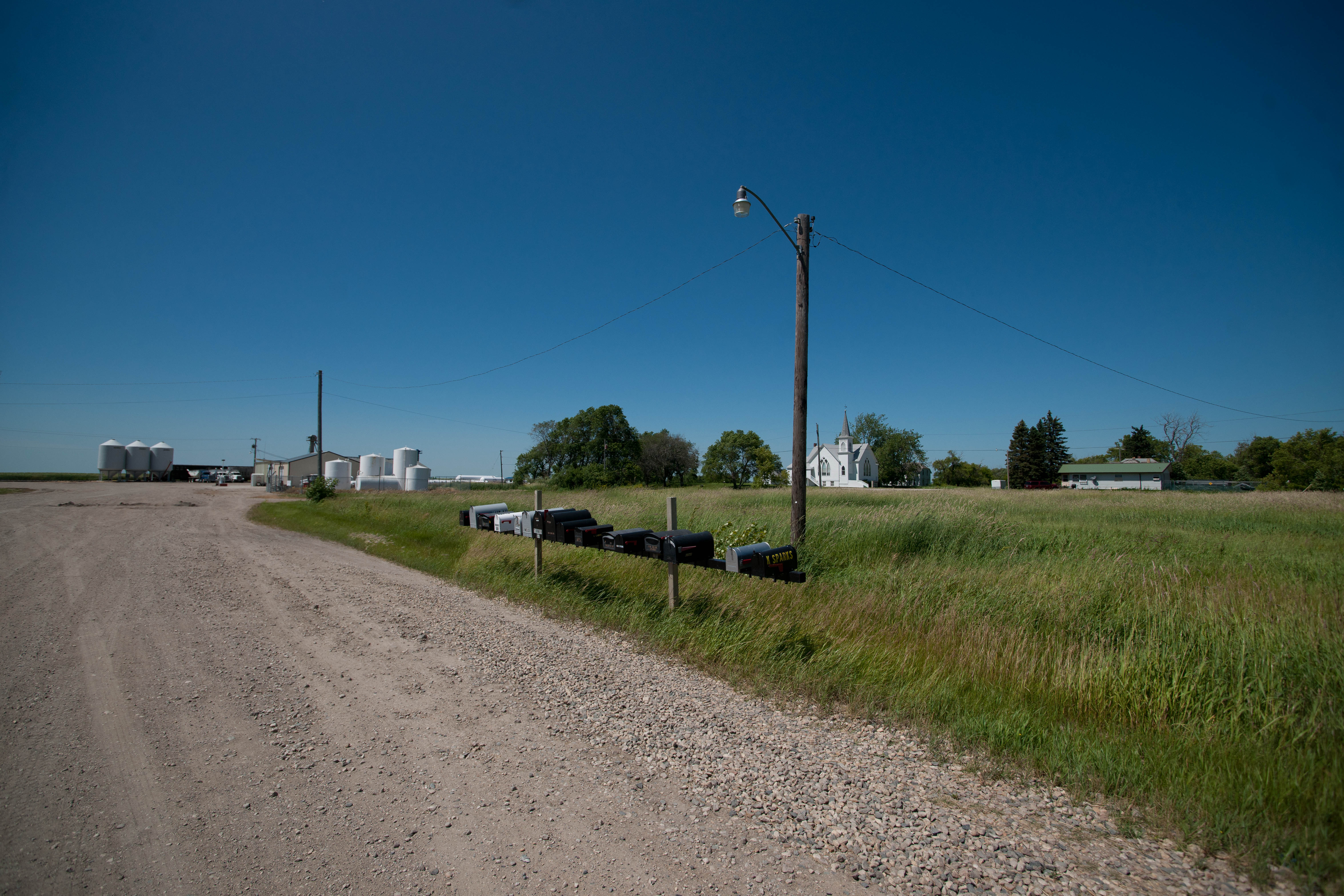
- Street in Calvin

- Location of Calvin, North Dakota
- Coordinates: 48.851849°N 98.938021°W
- Country: United States
- State: North Dakota
- County: Cavalier
- Founded: 1905

Area
  - Total: 0.219 sq mi (0.567 km^{2})
  - Land: 0.219 sq mi (0.567 km^{2})
  - Water: 0 sq mi (0.0 km^{2})
- Elevation: 1,617 ft (493 m)

Population (2020)
  - Total: 15
  - Estimate (2024): 13
  - Density: 68.5/sq mi (26.44/km^{2})
- Time zone: UTC–6 (Central (CST))
  - Summer (DST): UTC–5 (CDT)
- ZIP Code: 58323
- Area code: 701
- FIPS code: 38-11700
- GNIS feature ID: 1035951

Calvin is a city in Cavalier County, North Dakota, United States. The population was 15 at the 2020 census, and was estimated at 13 in 2024.

Likely the most historic structure left in town, the Calvin AF & AM Corinthian Masonic Lodge Number 78, was burned and razed in May 2014, after the upper floor had collapsed sometime between 2010 and 2012.

== History ==
Calvin was founded in 1905.

== Geography ==
According to the United States Census Bureau, the city has a total area of 0.219 square miles (0.57 km^{2}), all land.

== Demographics ==
Historical population
Census	Pop.	Note	%±
1920	350		—
1950	152		—
1960	104		−31.6%
1970	78		−25.0%
1980	61		−21.8%
1990	27		−55.7%
2000	26		−3.7%
2010	20		−23.1%
2020	15		−25.0%
2024 (est.)	13		−13.3%
U.S. Decennial Census; 2020 Census

=== 2010 census ===
As of the 2010 census, there were 20 people, 8 households, and 3 families residing in the city. The population density was 90.9 inhabitants per square mile (35.1/km^{2}). There were 10 housing units at an average density of 45.5 per square mile (17.6/km^{2}). The racial makeup of the city was 100.0% White.

There were 8 households, of which 25.0% had children under the age of 18 living with them, 37.5% were married couples living together, and 62.5% were non-families. 62.5% of all households were made up of individuals, and 25% had someone living alone who was 65 years of age or older. The average household size was 2.50 and the average family size was 5.00.

The median age in the city was 48.7 years. 25% of residents were under the age of 18; 10% were between the ages of 18 and 24; 0.0% were from 25 to 44; 50% were from 45 to 64; and 15% were 65 years of age or older. The gender makeup of the city was 60.0% male and 40.0% female.

=== 2000 census ===
As of the 2000 census, there were 26 people, 11 households, and 6 families residing in the city. The population density was 119.3 inhabitants per square mile (46.1/km^{2}). There were 19 housing units at an average density of 87.2 per square mile (33.7/km^{2}). The racial makeup of the city was 100.00% White.

There were 11 households, out of which 27.3% had children under the age of 18 living with them, 54.5% were married couples living together, 9.1% had a female householder with no husband present, and 36.4% were non-families. 36.4% of all households were made up of individuals, and 9.1% had someone living alone who was 65 years of age or older. The average household size was 2.36 and the average family size was 3.14.

In the city, the population was spread out, with 30.8% under the age of 18, 23.1% from 25 to 44, 30.8% from 45 to 64, and 15.4% who were 65 years of age or older. The median age was 44 years. For every 100 females, there were 188.9 males. For every 100 females age 18 and over, there were 157.1 males.

The median income for a household in the city was $31,667, and the median income for a family was $81,250. Males had a median income of $21,250 versus $56,250 for females. The per capita income for the city was $27,878. None of the population and none of the families were below the poverty line.
