= Calvin (surname) =

Calvin is a surname made notable by John Calvin, theologian, Protestant reformer and proponent of Calvinism. Notable people with the surname include:

- Henry Calvin (1918–1975), American comic actor
- Hiram Augustus Calvin (1841–1932), Canadian businessman and politician
- Idelette Calvin (died 1549), wife of John Calvin
- Ivy Calvin (born 1971), American former football player and TV personality
- Katherine Calvin (born in the 1980s), American earth scientist
- Kathy Calvin (born 1949), chief executive officer of the United Nations Foundation
- Linda Gist Calvin, American businesswoman and 41st President General of the Daughters of the American Revolution
- Melvin Calvin (1911–1997), American chemist; discoverer of the Calvin Cycle (see below)
- Samuel Calvin (1811–1890), Whig member of the U.S. House of Representatives from Pennsylvania
- Samuel Calvin (geologist) (1840–1911), American geologist
- Tom Calvin (1926–2020), former National Football League halfback
- William H. Calvin (born 1939), American neurophysiologist
- Wyn Calvin (1925–2022), Welsh comedian and entertainer
