= Steve Carra =

American politician

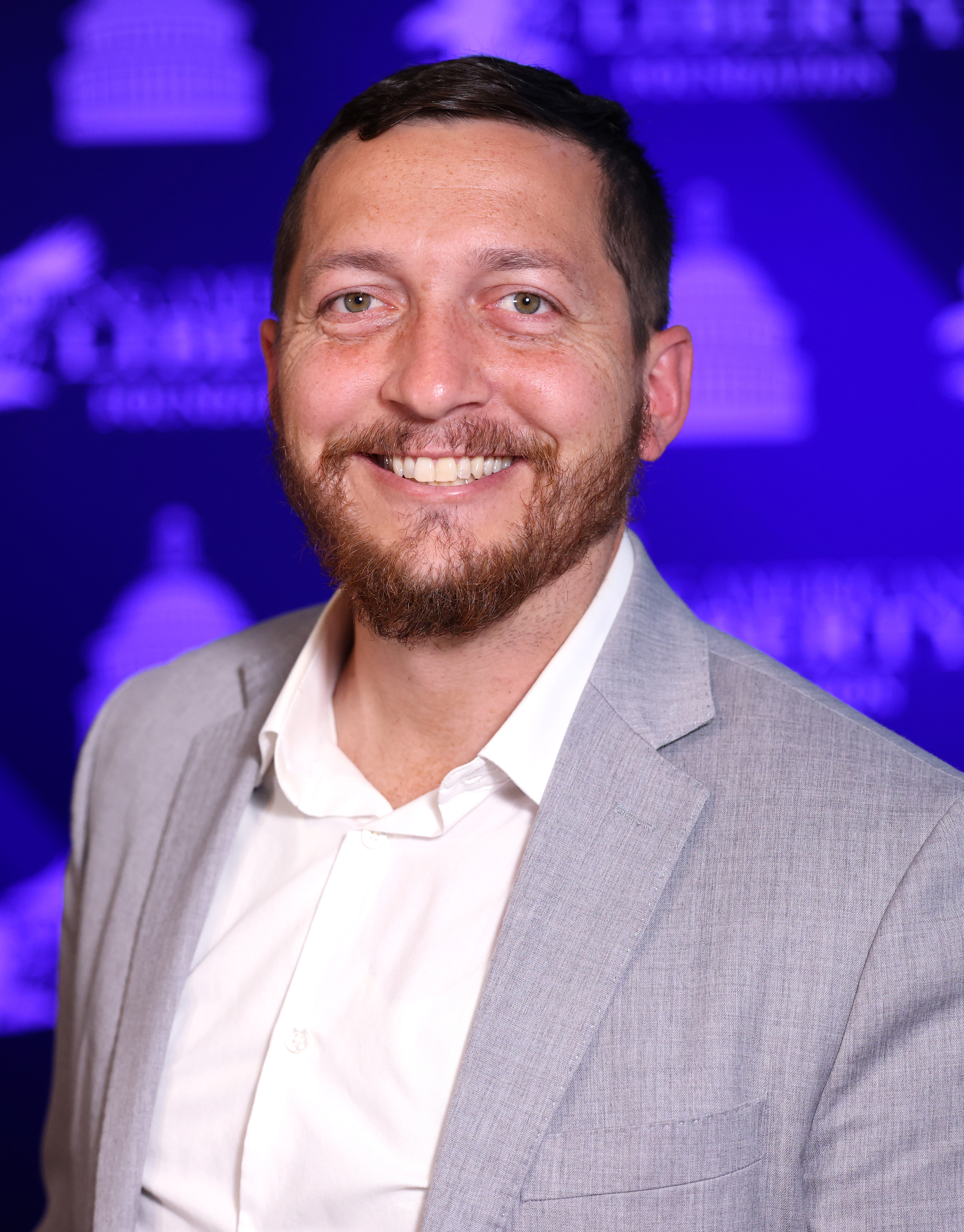
- Carra in 2024

Member of the Michigan House of Representatives
- Incumbent
- Assumed office January 1, 2021
- Preceded by: Aaron Miller
- Constituency: 59th district (2021–2023); 36th district (2023–present)

Personal details
- Born: Michigan, U.S.
- Party: Republican
- Education: Western Michigan University (BA)

Stephen Carra is an American politician serving as a member of the Michigan House of Representatives since 2021, currently representing the 36th district. He is a member of the Republican Party.

== Early life and education ==
Carra was born and raised in Southwest Michigan. After graduating from Portage Northern High School, Carra earned a Bachelor of Arts degree in economics and political science from Western Michigan University.

== Career ==
For three years, Carra worked in the office of State Representative Steve Johnson. He was also a research assistant at the Acton Institute.

Carra won election to the Michigan House in the 2020 elections. He announced that he would challenge Fred Upton in the Republican primary election for Michigan's 6th congressional district in the 2022 elections despite this being before redistricting and he and Upton not living in the same district. Former President Donald Trump endorsed Carra in the Republican primary, calling incumbent U.S. Representative Fred Upton a "RINO." Following redistricting, Carra was shifted to Michigan's 4th congressional district, and he withdrew from the race and endorsed Bill Huizenga. He instead ran in the 36th Michigan House district, and won reelection.

On October 10, 2021, Carra introduced House Bill 5444, also known as the "fetal heartbeat protection act."

In June 2022, Carra introduced a resolution calling for the 2021 United States Capitol attack to be named as "Remembrance Day," characterizing the event as a response to "unconstitutional mandates, government intrusion and power grabs by political elitists."

In June 2023, Carra was one of five Republicans to vote against a bill banning child marriage, joining Josh Schriver, Neil Friske, Matthew Maddock, and Angela Rigas.

In February 2025, Carra cosponsored a resolution by Schriver to condemn same-sex marriage and the Supreme Court's 2015 Obergefell v. Hodges decision.

Carra was reelected in 2024.
