= Maxine Berman =

American politician (1946–2018)

Maxine L. Berman (April 17, 1946 – March 2, 2018) was an American politician who served on the Michigan House of Representatives between 1983 and 1996.

Berman was raised in Oak Park and graduated from the University of Michigan. She then taught at Oak Park High School until running for political office. She was a member of the Michigan House of Representatives from 1983 to 1996. Upon leaving office, Berman established Capitol Strategies, Inc., a consultancy firm, and led the Women's Health Network of Michigan. Governor Jennifer Granholm appointed Berman as director of special projects in 2003. She left the post in 2008 and became the Griffin Endowed Chair in American Government at Central Michigan University the next year, retiring in 2013. In 2015, Berman was elected to the Michigan Women's Hall of Fame. She died aged 71 on March 2, 2018, of lung cancer, in West Bloomfield, Michigan.
