= Marcellus Township, Michigan =

- Civil township
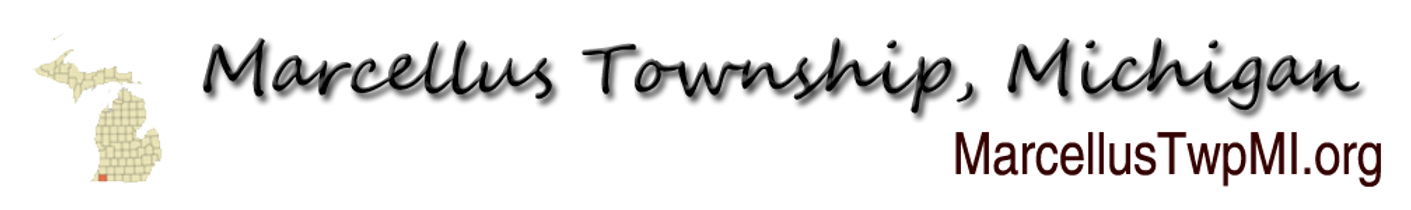
- logo

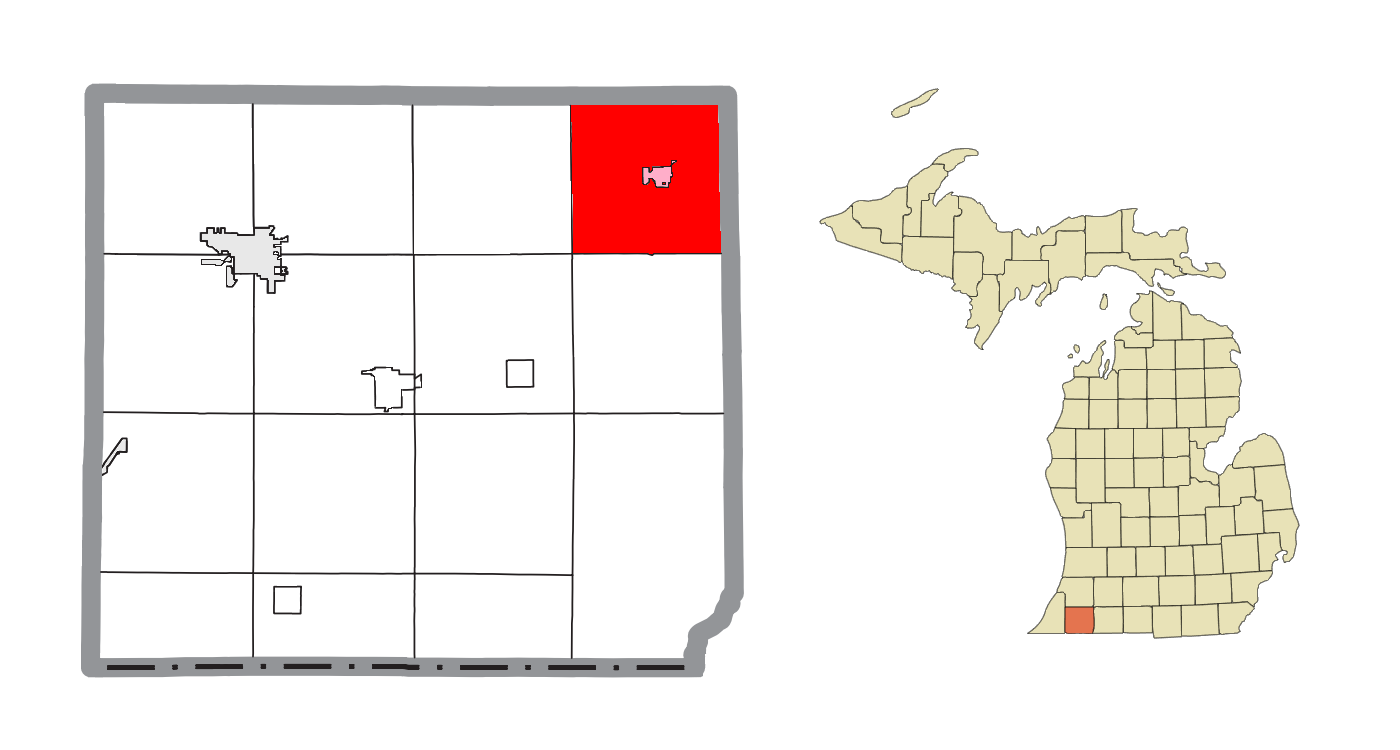
- Location within Cass County (red) and the administered village of Marcellus (pink)

- Location within the state of Michigan Marcellus Township (the United States)
- Coordinates: 42°01′35″N 85°49′07″W
- Country: United States
- State: Michigan
- County: Cass

Area
  - Total: 34.9 sq mi (90.3 km^{2})
  - Land: 33.2 sq mi (86.0 km^{2})
  - Water: 1.7 sq mi (4.4 km^{2})
- Elevation: 896 ft (273 m)

Population (2020)
  - Total: 2,401
  - Density: 72.3/sq mi (27.9/km^{2})
- Time zone: UTC-5 (Eastern (EST))
  - Summer (DST): UTC-4 (EDT)
- ZIP code(s): 49067
- Area code: 269
- FIPS code: 26-51480
- GNIS feature ID: 1626683
- Website: www.marcellustwpmi.org

Marcellus Township is a civil township of Cass County in the U.S. state of Michigan. The population was 2,401 at the 2020 census. The village of Marcellus is within the township.

== History ==
The township was organized and had an election on June 16, 1843, in which the first township supervisor, Daniel G. Rouse, was elected. Guerdon R. Beebee was elected treasurer, and Ephraim Huyatt was elected clerk. The growth of Marcellus township and village can be attributed to the Peninsular Railroad in the winter of 1870–1871, which created an economic boom for the area at the time.

== Geography ==
Marcellus Township is located in the northeast corner of Cass County in southwestern Michigan. According to the United States Census Bureau, the township has a total area of 34.9 square miles (90.3 km^{2}), of which 33.2 square miles (86.0 km^{2}) is land and 1.7 square miles (4.4 km^{2}), or 4.82%, is water. There are 15 named lakes in the township, the largest of which is Fish Lake in the northwest. The Rocky River, a tributary of the St. Joseph River, rises near the western border of the township and flows east towards Three Rivers.

According to the Cass County Road Commission, there was a total of 15.60 miles (25.11 km) of primary road and 46.50 miles (74.83 km) of local road in the township of Marcellus, as of December 31, 2008.

== Demographics ==
Historical population
Census	Pop.	Note	%±
2000	2,712		—
2010	2,539		−6.4%
2020	2,401		−5.4%

As of the census of 2000, there were 2,712 people, 1,021 households, and 752 families residing in the township. The population density was 81.4 inhabitants per square mile (31.4/km^{2}). There were 1,186 housing units at an average density of 35.6 per square mile (13.7/km^{2}). The racial makeup of the township was 96.57% White, 0.81% African American, 0.52% Native American, 0.15% Asian, 0.18% from other races, and 1.77% from two or more races. Hispanic or Latino of any race were 1.14% of the population. There are no Pacific Islanders.

There were 1,021 households, out of which 34.6% had children under the age of 18 living with them, 59.1% were married couples living together, 9.7% had a female householder with no husband present, and 26.3% were non-families. 22.1% of all households were made up of individuals, and 9.4% had someone living alone who was 65 years of age or older. The average household size was 2.66 and the average family size was 3.08.

In the township the population was spread out, with 27.7% under the age of 18, 8.4% from 18 to 24, 29.0% from 25 to 44, 22.3% from 45 to 64, and 12.7% who were 65 years of age or older. The median age was 35 years. For every 100 females, there were 98.8 males. For every 100 females age 18 and over, there were 96 males.

The median income for a household in the township was $39,306, and the median income for a family was $42,560. Males had a median income of $34,773 versus $24,214 for females. The per capita income for the township was $17,442. About 9.1% of families and 12.1% of the population were below the poverty line, including 13.6% of those under age 18 and 14.1% of those age 65 or over.
