= Calvin Township, Michigan =

- Civil township
- logo

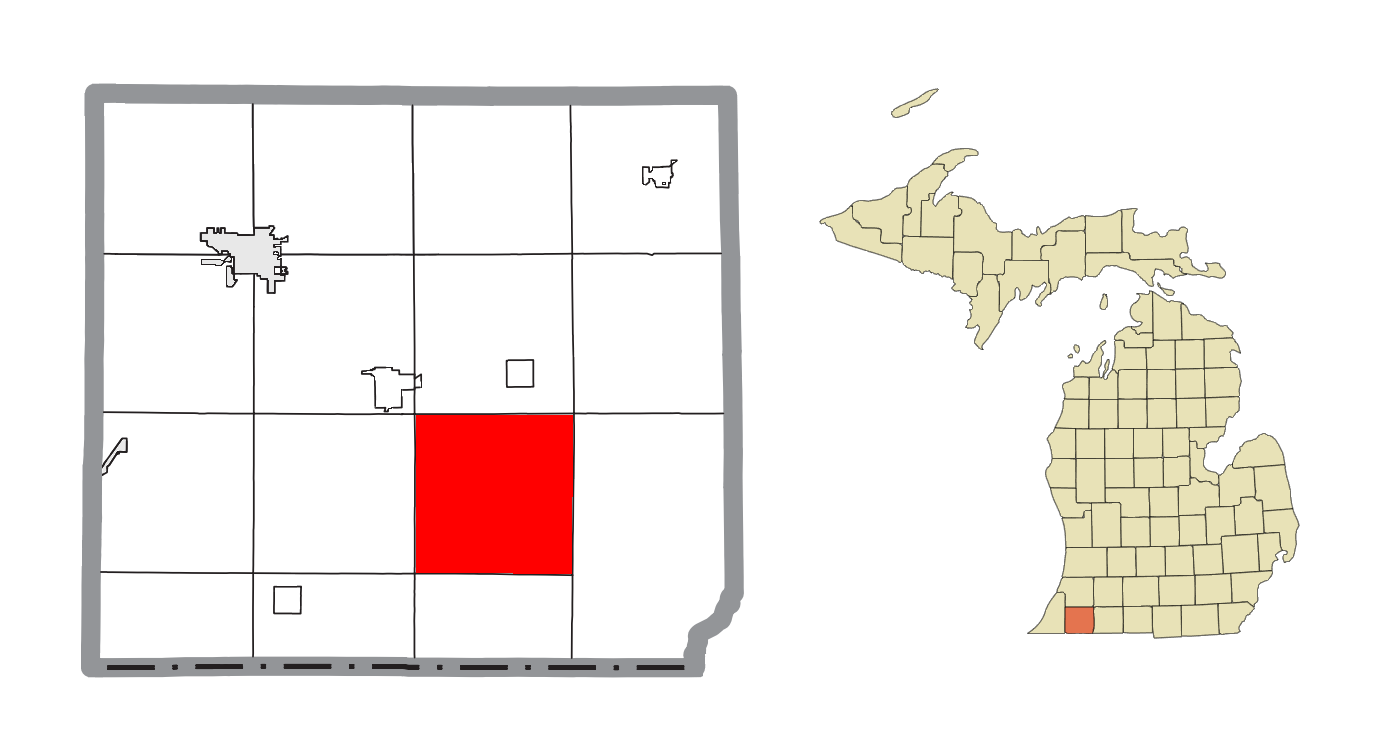
- Location within Cass County

- Location within the state of Michigan Calvin Township (the United States)
- Coordinates: 41°51′31″N 85°56′54″W
- Country: United States
- State: Michigan
- County: Cass
- Organized: 1835

Area
  - Total: 35.6 sq mi (92.1 km^{2})
  - Land: 34.3 sq mi (88.9 km^{2})
  - Water: 1.2 sq mi (3.1 km^{2})
- Elevation: 830 ft (253 m)

Population (2020)
  - Total: 1,993
  - Density: 58.1/sq mi (22.4/km^{2})
- Time zone: UTC-5 (Eastern (EST))
  - Summer (DST): UTC-4 (EDT)
- ZIP code(s): 49031, 49061, 49095, 49130
- Area code: 269
- FIPS code: 26-12620
- GNIS feature ID: 1626024
- Website: Official website

Calvin Township is a civil township of Cass County in the U.S. state of Michigan. The population was 1,993 at the 2020 census.

== History ==
Calvin Township's first public school was built in 1834. Calvin Township was organized in 1835 and named for Calvin Britain who represented Cass County in the state legislature. Calvin Township along with Cass County generally was part of the Underground Railroad. In 1850 Calvin Township's population was 25.3% African-American. Many of these families are of mixed Native ancestry, especially from the Saponi, Lumbee, and Pamunkey tribes.

== Geography ==
According to the United States Census Bureau, the township has a total area of 35.6 square miles (92.1 km^{2}), of which 34.3 square miles (88.9 km^{2}) is land and 1.2 square miles (3.1 km^{2}), or 3.41%, is water. Calvin Township is the location of the Calvin impact crater.

== Communities ==
- Brownsville began with a gristmill built by Pleasant Grubb in 1831. It was located at the lower end of Diamond Lake. It had a post office from 1854 until 1901.
- Calvin Center is an unincorporated community on the central part of the township. Located about 3.8 miles south of Diamond Lake, 4 miles south of Vandalia, 18 miles east of Niles, 17 miles west of Constantine, 5 miles north of U.S. Route 12 and is located on Calvin Center Rd. in the Cassopolis address area.

== Demographics ==
Historical population
Census	Pop.	Note	%±
2000	2,041		—
2010	2,037		−0.2%
2020	1,993		−2.2%

As of the census of 2000, there were 2,041 people, 784 households, and 559 families residing in the township. The population density was 59.3 inhabitants per square mile (22.9/km^{2}). There were 999 housing units at an average density of 29.0 per square mile (11.2/km^{2}). The racial makeup of the township was 69.43% White, 23.22% African American, 0.54% Native American, 0.69% Asian, 1.08% from other races, and 5.05% from two or more races. Hispanic or Latino of any race were 2.50% of the population.

There were 784 households, out of which 30.1% had children under the age of 18 living with them, 55.0% were married couples living together, 11.2% had a female householder with no husband present, and 28.6% were non-families. 21.4% of all households were made up of individuals, and 8.7% had someone living alone who was 65 years of age or older. The average household size was 2.60 and the average family size was 3.03.

In the township the population was spread out, with 26.4% under the age of 18, 6.7% from 18 to 24, 29.0% from 25 to 44, 26.4% from 45 to 64, and 11.6% who were 65 years of age or older. The median age was 38 years. For every 100 females, there were 102.3 males. For every 100 females age 18 and over, there were 101.5 males.

The median income for a household in the township was $42,171, and the median income for a family was $48,750. Males had a median income of $33,289 versus $25,472 for females. The per capita income for the township was $21,387. About 8.8% of families and 16.1% of the population were below the poverty line, including 28.5% of those under age 18 and 16.3% of those age 65 or over.

== Education ==
All of Calvin Township is zoned to Cassopolis Public Schools.
