= Criffield-Whiteley House =

- U.S. National Register of Historic Places
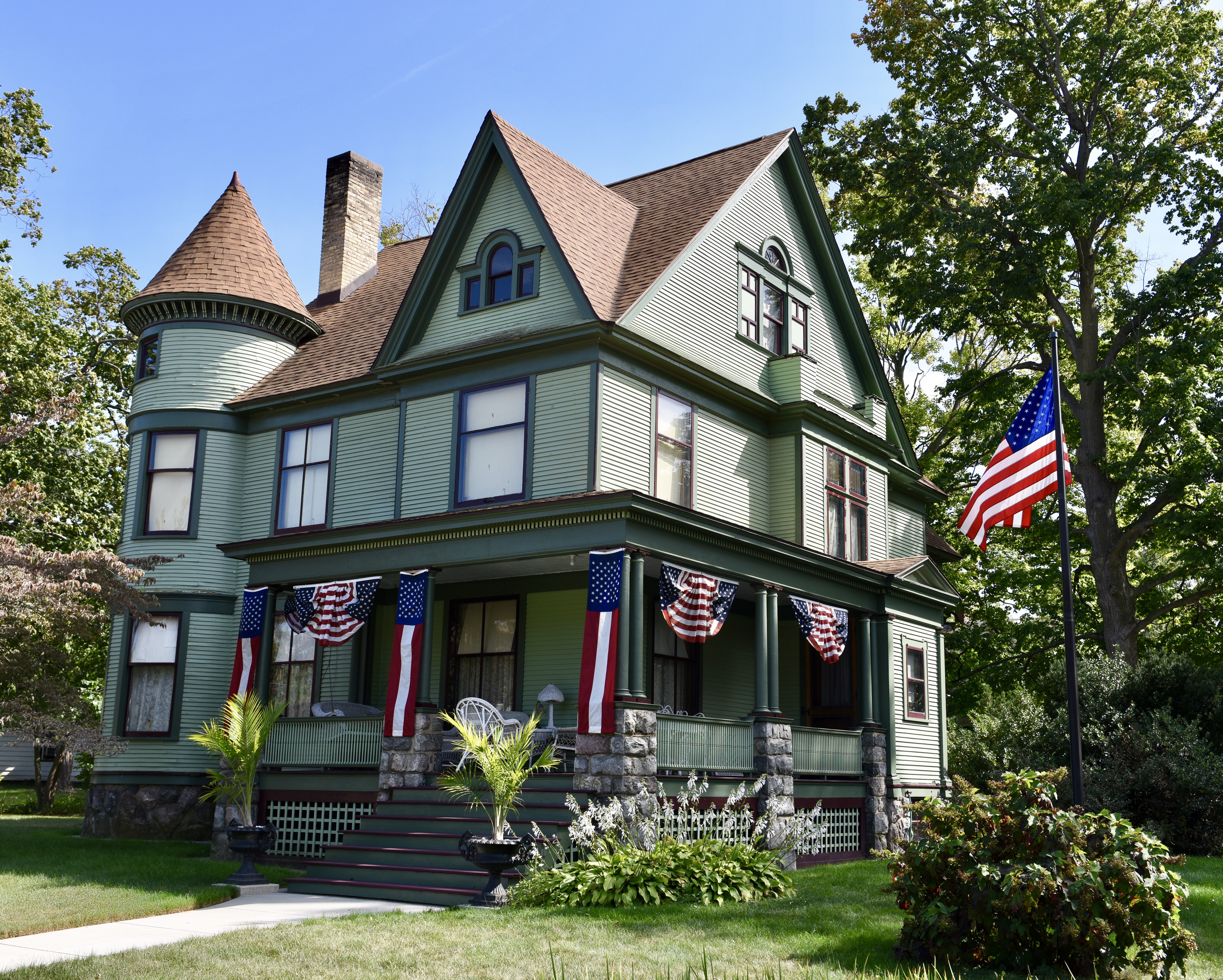

- Location within Michigan Location within the United States
- Interactive map
- Location: 601 Main St., Dowagiac, Michigan, USA
- Coordinates: 41°59′6″N 86°7′1″W
- Built: 1897
- Architectural style: Queen Anne
- NRHP reference No.: 16000818
- Added to NRHP: December 6, 2016

The Criffield-Whiteley House is a private house located at 601 Main Street in Dowagiac, Michigan, United States. It was added to the National Register of Historic Places in 2016 and was designated a Michigan Historic Site in 2019.

== History ==
This house was built in 1897 by Fred Corber for Charles and Cora Criffield. Criffield was a farmer in Silver Creek Township and wished to move to town so they would be close to their son Loyd's school. In April 1896 the Criffield's and Corber traveled to Grand Rapids to review modern house plans and they picked this Queen-Anne's style house.

It was suspected that the design was copied from a 1893 pattern book of houses and cottages designed by D.F. Hopkins, a Grand Rapids architect. The design is very similar. The estimated cost to build the house was $2,400 - $2,900 (present day estimate = $102,000) If no plumbing was to be included $250 could be deducted ($9k today) an if no hard wood was to be used for the woodwork you could deduct $100 ($4k today). Very happy they chose to build with plumbing, electricity and wood work. It was a very modern home in 1897

The cut Michigan fieldstone for the foundation was brought from the Criffield's farm. The masonry work was done under the supervision of Mr. Genung and Mr. Doolittle. The Crittields lived here for 23 years until 1920. They wanted a smaller house so they built the bungalow next to the hospital, 519 Main Street.

In 1920 the Criffields sold the house to Sara Ethel and Harry H. Whiteley. Elected to the Michigan House of Representatives in 1914. Mr. Whiteley moved his family to Dowagiac in 1915 in order to buy into and manage the Dowagiac Daily News. Harry H. Whiteley (1882–1957) used his successful Dowagiac newspaper and his position as a member of the Michigan Senate (1923–26) and the Michigan Conservation Commission (1927–48) to shape Michigan's public land policy. Harry was the founder of the State Conservation Commission now the DNR. He advocated for Warren Dunes and many other state parks. Sara Ethel (1882–1975), a founding member of the Samuel Felt Chapter of the Daughters of the American Revolution, led the chapter's effort to honor veterans of World War II with a memorial highway and park along M-62 between Cassopolis and Dowagiac. The Whiteley's had two sons and two daughters.

The next owners of the house were Martha and LeRoy Cox from 1960 to 1981. They have been longtime residents of Dowagiac and LeRoy was a banker in town. They had five sons, Kevin the oldest lives next door.

Andy and Jane Anderson bought the house in 1981 and have 3 sons. The Anderson's enhanced the home's Victorian theme through their choices of wallpaper, paint, curtains and furniture. The exterior has been repainted to its original color - still today. The peacock frieze wallpaper in the two parlors is an adaptation of a Victorian design and is printed in 10 colors. The Willow pattern in the foyer and the Vermillion star frieze in the nursery are authentic reproductions of the original wallpaper. The paper in the saloon is called an Anglo-Japanese room set with Eastlake influence done in a very Victorian style. Andy also registered the home with the National Register of Historic Places. It was added to the National Register of Historic Places in 2016 and was designated a Michigan Historic Site in 2019 with the Money's present

Matt and Alexia Money bought from Andy Anderson in 2019 and will raise their two sons, William and Wesley here.

The house has had no structural changes made to it since it was constructed. At the time of construction it had electricity, plumbing and a Round Oak furnace. The Round Oak furnace has been changed from coal to oil to natural gas. The furnace was replaced by the Money's in 2021 to be more efficient. The two parlors, dining room and entry are trimmed in oak; the rest of the house trim is Ash. The main floor has three sets of pocket sliding doors and two single sliding doors all made of oak. The built-in china cabinet, fireplace, front entry and lock plates in the doors all feature the same laurel wreath pattern. The Money's will continue to preserve and protect the history of the house. When they arrived they removed the 1950s carpet in the main floor parlors, and bathrooms. The bathrooms now have ceramic tile and all the hard wood floors have been refinished. They have refinished all the hard wood floors. Matt maintains the yard to be in perfect condition and every other year you will see Allexia on a hydraulic lift painting the exterior. Currently the house has had five owners since it was built in 1897.

== Description ==
It is a 2 1/2-story Queen Anne house sitting on a rubble fieldstone foundation which is made from large, carefully fitted pieces. The house is across from a triangular city park containing the Civil War Monument.

== Gallery ==
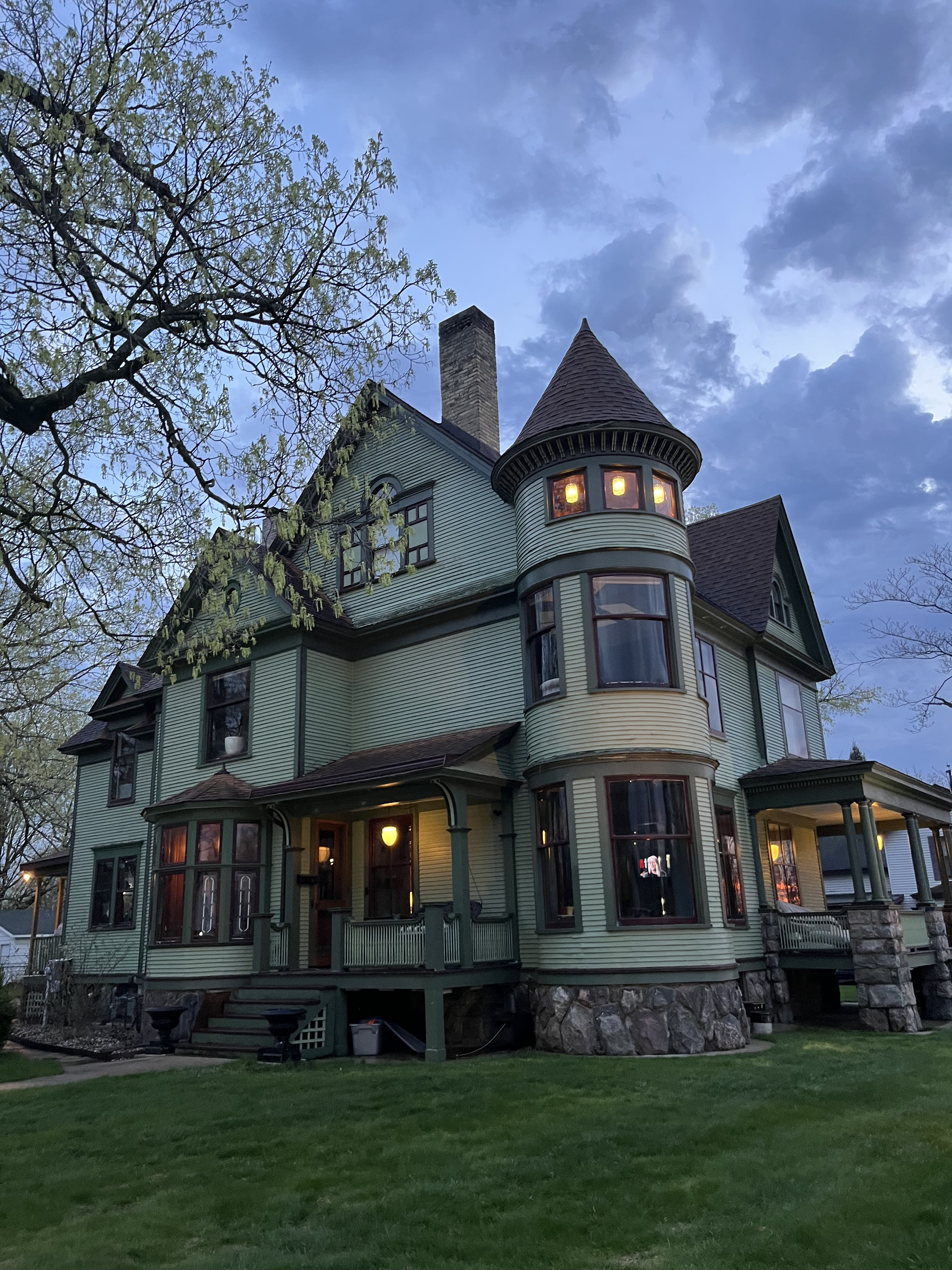
Evening image of the Criffield-Whitley House (April 2026)

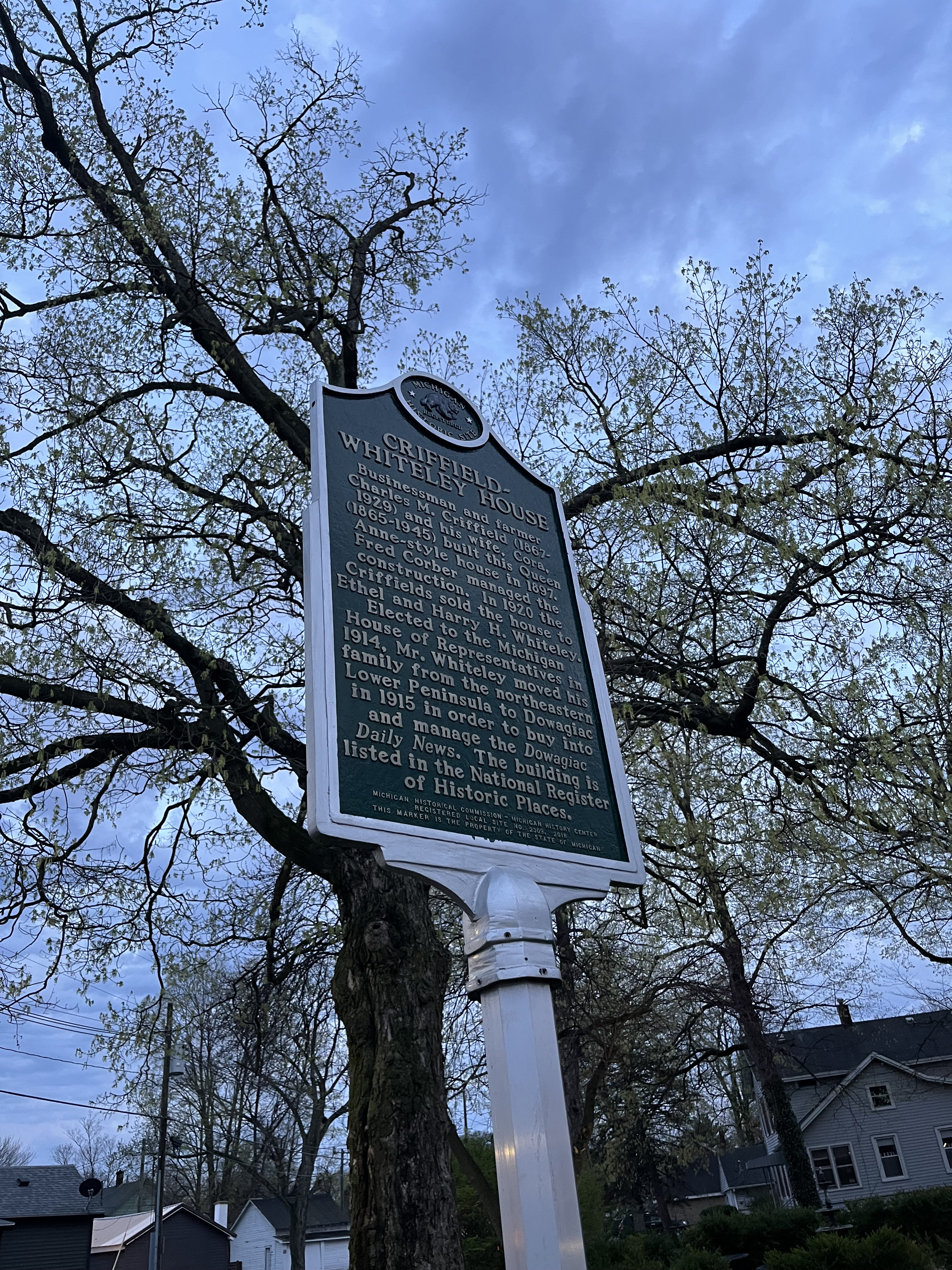
Sign with information on the Criffield-Whitley House

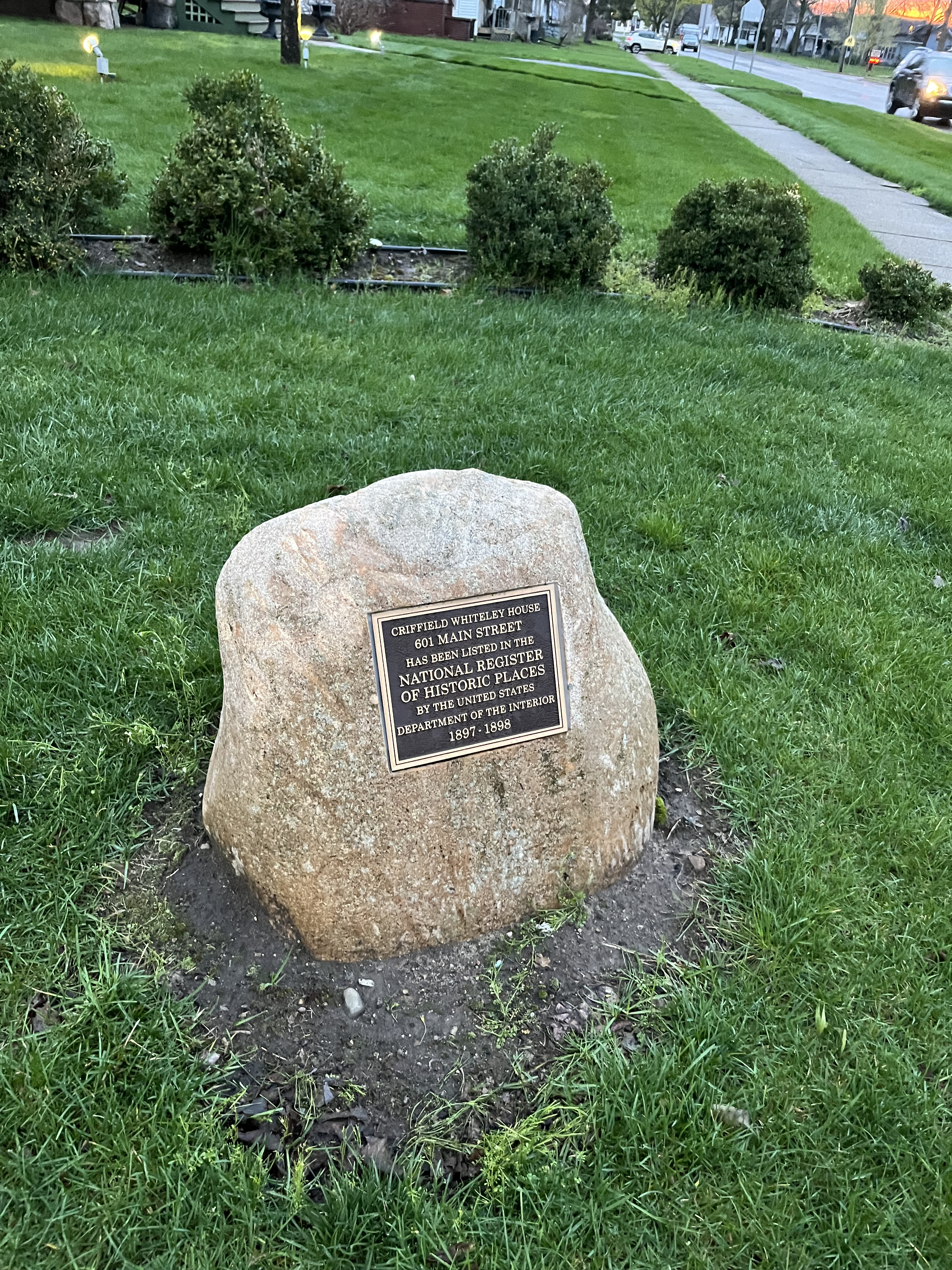
A rock marking the site of the Criffield-Whitley House
