= Dewey Lake Monster =

Creature of Michigan folklore

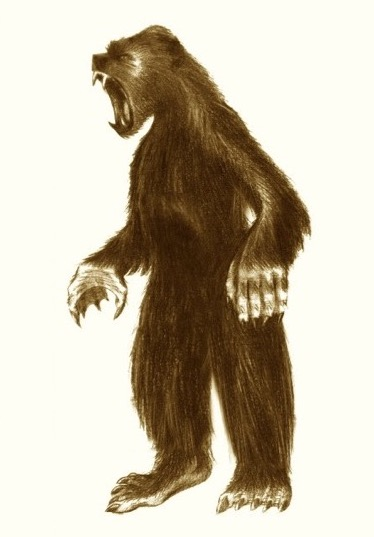
- Dewey Lake Monster (witness composite)

Creature information
- Other name: Sister Lakes Sasquatch
- Similar entities: Bigfoot
- Folklore: Cryptid

Origin
- First attested: 1964
- Country: United States
- Region: Southern Michigan

The Dewey Lake Monster, also known as the Sister Lakes Sasquatch, is purported to be an ape-like creature, similar to descriptions of Bigfoot, that was allegedly sighted in the summer of 1964 near Dewey Lake and Sister Lakes in Dowagiac.

== Description ==
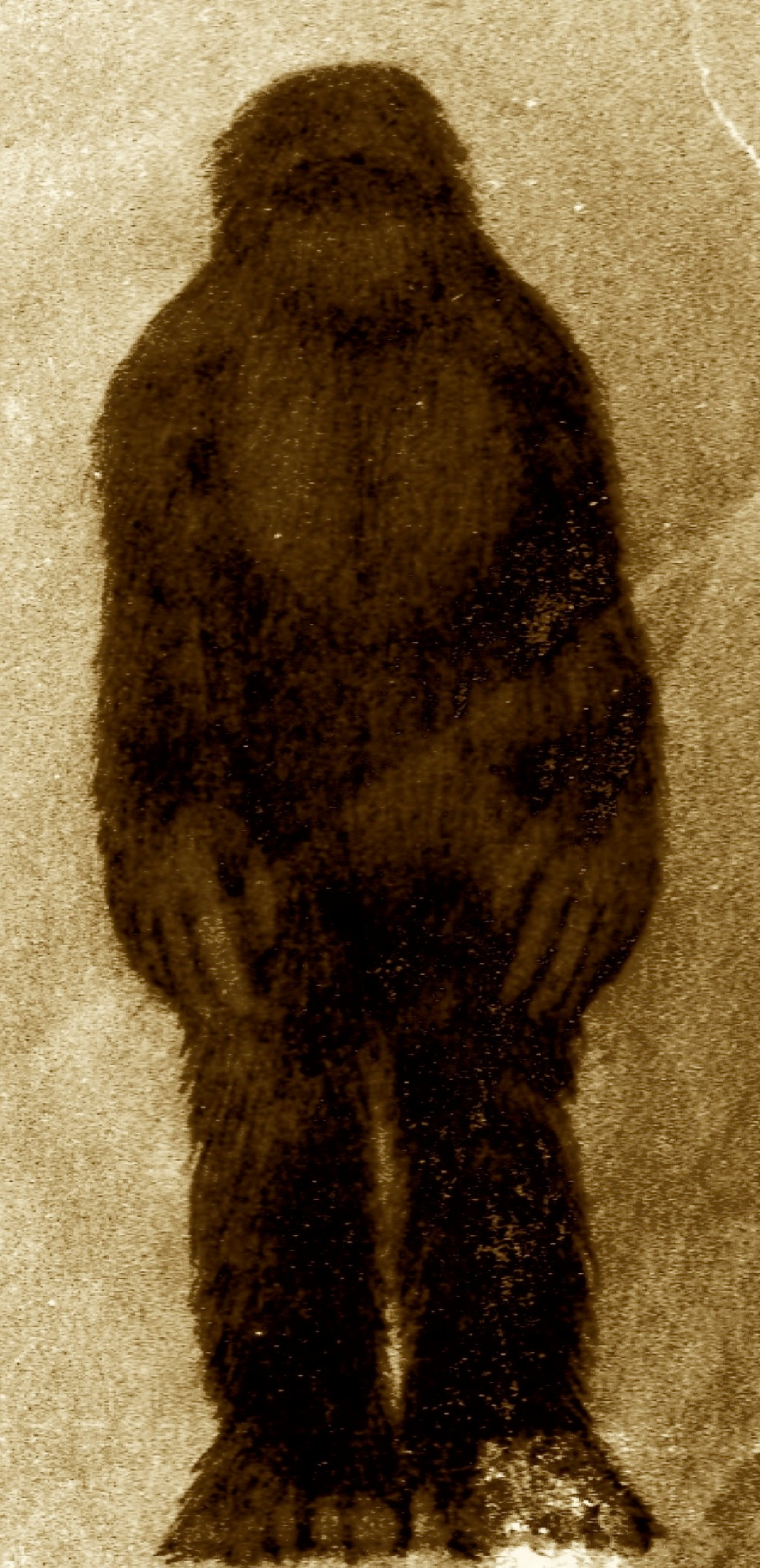
Garcon Train Sighting

The creature was described as covered in hair, approximately 10 feet (3 m) tall, 500 pounds (230 kilograms), and had glowing eyes.

== History ==
In June 1964, the story gained national attention after local residents reported seeing a large, hairy creature with glowing eyes. Police searched the area of the alleged sightings and found nothing. Nevertheless, the reports caused curious thrill-seekers and monster hunters to besiege the community that summer. Local entrepreneurs capitalized on the event by selling "monster getaway gas", "monster burgers", and "monster hunting kits" — with a net, flashlight, squirt gun, a mallet, and a stake. Newspapers in Chicago began dubbing Sister Lakes "Monster Town USA", as well as caricaturing small town stereotypes.

Several zoologists suggested that people may have misidentified a bear or gorilla. Cass County Sheriff Robert Dool and conservation officer William Rowe dismissed speculations of a monster. Within a week, the hysteria diminished, and the South Bend Tribune reported that "nobody seems frightened anymore".

In a 1983 retrospective, the South Bend Tribune suggested that the monster was imagined by intoxicated strawberry pickers.

== Popular culture ==
- In 2016, the annual Dewey Lake Boat Parade celebrated the Dewey Lake Monster legend.
- Local brewery Sister Lakes Brewing named a beer after the Dewey Lake Monster.
