= Round Oak Stove Company =

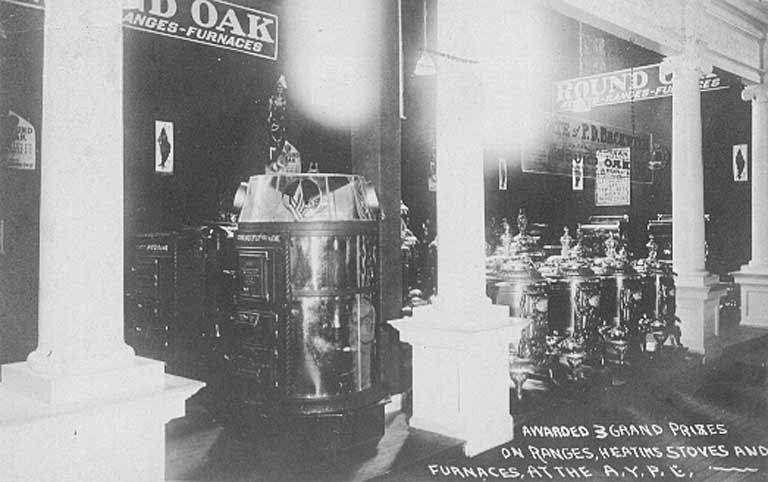
- Round Oak exhibit at the Alaska–Yukon–Pacific Exposition, Seattle, 1909
- Company type: Private
- Founded: 1871
- Defunct: 1946
- Headquarters: Dowagiac, Michigan
- Products: Heating stoves

The Round Oak Stove Company was founded in Dowagiac, Michigan in 1871 by Philo D. Beckwith. Beckwith cast his first stove around 1867 to heat his struggling foundry and shortly after, the Michigan Central Railroad ordered the heaters for its depots between Detroit and Chicago. By 1871, Beckwith was mainly producing heating stoves, and thus founded the company.

== Name origin ==
The origin of the name Round Oak is unknown. The first theory is that Beckwith stoves were round and could hold a section of whole round oak tree in the firepot. The second theorizes that he named it after a foundry of the same name in England.

== History ==
Round Oak was considered the finest heating stove money could buy because of the quality of its durable heating stove and by the late 1890s there were many “oak” imitators on the market. The company expanded rapidly and at its height in the 1910s, employed 1200 of the 5000 residents in Dowagiac, Michigan. Round Oak's influence on Dowagiac went far beyond its factory grounds. The company sponsored a semi-professional baseball team and the Round Oak Band. Dances were held in Round Oak Hall.

P. D. Beckwith died in January 1889, leaving the management of the firm to his son-in-law, Fred E. Lee. In 1892 in memory of P. D. Beckwith, his daughter Kate and son-in-law, Fred Lee built the Beckwith Memorial Theatre in the downtown at Front and Beeson streets. Regarded as one of the finest theatres between New York and Chicago, it hosted such well-known names as William S. Hart, Roland Reed, Robert Mantell and Otis Skinner. The original Beckwith building also contained space used for a bank, city hall and Round Oak Company offices. The busts that decorated the building's exterior included Beethoven, Chopin, Liszt, Emerson, Whitman, Shakespeare, Sarah Bernhardt and Susan B. Anthony. When the building was razed in 1966, the busts were salvaged. Eight are today used in columns standing at the entrance to the Lyons Building at Southwestern Michigan College in Dowagiac.

After Beckwith's death, the official company name was changed to The Estate of P.D. Beckwith Incorporated. Most stoves produced after 1890 carry the mark of “Estate of P.D. Beckwith” along with “Round Oak”, which has confused novice collectors as to the original owner of Round Oak stoves – many believing they have purchased a stove actually used by Beckwith himself. The company also added new products, like furnaces and cooking stoves, and introduced a popular mascot around 1900 – Chief Doe-Wah-Jack.

Chief Doe-Wah-Jack, a fictional Native American, appeared on most Round Oak Stove Company and Estate of P.D. Beckwith Inc. advertising and stoves until the company's demise in 1946. Chief Doe-Wah-Jack was introduced when, with the spread of the telephone, customers had trouble pronouncing Dowagiac when asking the operator for a connection. Chief-Doe-Wah-Jack remedied that problem by providing the town's phonetic spelling.

Poor management and deaths led to the start of Round Oak's decline in 1914. Ormal Beach, the company's first salesman, died that year; Arthur Beckwith, Philo's adopted son and major innovator of Round Oak products over the years, died of tuberculosis; and lastly, veteran employee Arthur Rudolphi left to start his own furnace company after being denied a promotion. In 1915, the Rudy Furnace Company became the first of three Round Oak competitors to open in Dowagiac, followed by Premier in 1920 and Dowagiac Steel Furnace in 1929.

=== 1920s onwards ===
Round Oak stayed strong into the 1920s and survived the Great Depression, though greatly damaged. World War II government contracts helped the company stay afloat, but once the war ended, Round Oak was in ruins. The company stopped producing stoves in 1946 and in 1947, sold its buildings to Kaizer-Frazer for the production of automobile engine parts. The Round Oak name was sold to Peerless Furnace, which continued to make repair parts for furnaces and stoves.

== Modern times ==
The complex of Round Oak buildings on Spaulding Street now house Ameriwood Furniture. Today, a small collection of Round Oak Stoves is displayed within the offices of the Greater Dowagiac Chamber of Commerce and Downtown Development Authority, located within the historic Dowagiac train depot. The Estate of P.D. Beckwith Inc. and Round Oak Stove & Furnace Company artifacts are collected worldwide today. The Dowagiac Area History Museum on West Railroad Street, in Dowagiac, Michigan has the largest public collection of Round Oak heating stoves in the world. The museum's vast collection includes (in addition to stoves) artifacts related to P.D. Beckwith's grain drill and early stove business, advertising, company ledgers and papers, workers’ implements and many one-of-a kind pieces.
