= Dickinson Bishop =

American businessman, World War I veteran and Titanic survivor (1887–1961)

Dickinson H. Bishop
- Undated photo
- Born: March 24, 1887; Dowagiac, Michigan, U.S.
- Died: February 16, 1961 (aged 73); Ottawa, Illinois, U.S.
- Occupation: Businessman
- Known for: Titanic survivor
- Spouses: Mary Lee, Helen Walton, Sydney Boyce
- Military career
- Allegiance: United States
- Branch: U.S. Army
- Service years: 1917—1918
- Conflicts: First World War

Dickinson H. Bishop (March 24, 1887 – February 16, 1961) was an American businessman who traveled on board the ill-fated maiden voyage of the RMS Titanic while on his honeymoon with bride Helen, née Walton. They both survived the sinking of the Titanic on 15 April 1912.

== Early life ==
Bishop was born in Dowagiac, Michigan, son of George and Virginia Bishop. He was 24 when he married Mary Beckwith Lee, an heiress who died in 1910 thirteen days after giving birth to a daughter; the infant died minutes after being born. Bishop married his second wife, Helen Walton, in November 1911; their four-month honeymoon was to Europe and North Africa, arranging the return on the Titanic. During their trip, Helen became pregnant, and they acquired a dog named Freu Freu while traveling in Italy.

== Titanic ==
=== Voyage ===
The Bishops boarded the Titanic at Cherbourg, France as First-class passengers on 10 April 1912. Late on the night of the 14th, the Bishops were in their stateroom when the Titanic struck an iceberg. Soon after, according to Dickinson Bishop, he went on deck to investigate and subsequently returned to the room after being told by stewards that the ship was in no danger. Later, fellow passenger Albert Stewart convinced the Bishops of the danger, and they returned to the boat deck, leaving Freu Freu behind. Although there was no sense of urgency at that point, they both were told to board lifeboat #7. In a newspaper interview, Helen Bishop stated that when they went on deck, someone said the newly married couples should be put into the lifeboat first and that there were three newlywed couples in their boat. However, this was not mentioned during her later testimony at the US Inquiry into the disaster. At the inquiry, Helen Bishop also recalled seeing John Jacob Astor IV urging them to put their lifebelts on and board a boat.

Boat 7 was the first to be lowered from the Titanic, being launched at about 12:45 am on the early morning of the 15th, and was rescued by the Carpathia sometime after 4:10 am. The Bishops, along with other survivors, were transported to New York City aboard the Carpathia.

=== Inquiry ===
Once in New York, the couple was ordered to report to the Senate Board of Inquiry in Washington D.C. Helen Bishop testified first, stating that she was conversing with Mr. and Mrs. John Jacob Astor prior to the ship's sinking, when Captain Smith came to speak to Mr. Astor. Astor told the group he was talking with to put on life belts and go on deck. Once on deck, an officer took Mrs. Bishop by the arm and told her to quietly get into the lifeboat; after that, her husband was pushed into the boat with her. Helen Bishop said there were 12 women, 13 men and three crew members in the lifeboat; she continued by saying many of the men in the boat were not married.

Dickinson Bishop's testimony mainly dealt with the inability to lock the ship's watertight compartments. He recalled the sailors trying to turn the locks and not being able to close them properly on either side of the ship. Bishop also said that he heard no orders to keep the men out of the lifeboats in favor of women and children.

Bishop was later rumored to have dressed as a woman to get his spot in the lifeboat; this rumor, in part, led to the divorce of the couple. On 8 December 1912, Helen gave birth to a boy, Randall Walton Bishop, who died two days afterward.

== Later life ==
In November 1913, Helen suffered a serious car accident in which she was badly injured, in a car driven by her husband's cousin Bartlett Dickinson. He lost control speeding with an iced-up windshield. Helen Bishop's head injuries were so severe, they were reported as being fatal by The New York Times. In an attempt to save Helen's life, her doctors tried what was then a new technique: a silver plate was affixed to her skull to cover the badly injured area.

In January 1916, Dickinson and Helen divorced. Charging her husband with cruelty and drunkenness, Helen Bishop was granted a divorce and $100,000 in alimony. She died two months later, on March 16, 1916, after falling at a friend's home on a visit to Danville, Illinois. Dickinson married his third wife, Sydney Boyce, a daughter of William D. Boyce, two days before the death of his second wife, Helen. The announcements of Dickinson's remarriage and Helen's death were both front page stories of the Dowagiac Daily News on the same day.

He served in the Army during the First World War. Bishop remained married to Sydney Boyce until her death in November 1950. After the end of the Second World War, he moved away from Dowagiac and settled in Ottawa, Illinois where he died from a stroke on February 16, 1961.
