= Goose Creek Grasslands =

Goose Creek Grasslands Nature Sanctuary
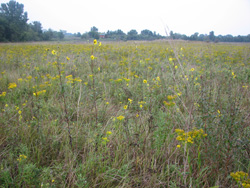

- Location within Michigan
- Location: Lower Peninsula, Lenawee County, Michigan USA
- Nearest city: Jackson, Michigan
- Coordinates: 42.06174°N 84.32407°W
- Area: 70-acre (28 ha)
- Governing body: Michigan Nature Association, non-profit

Goose Creek Grasslands Nature Sanctuary, commonly referred to as Goose Creek, is a 70-acre (28 ha) nature sanctuary located in Lenawee County, Michigan. It is maintained and preserved by the Michigan Nature Association.

== About the sanctuary ==
Goose Creek is home to a prairie fen habitat, which is a unique wetland that is found only in the glaciated Midwest. More than 200 plant species have been recorded here, including native orchids and pitcher plants, as well as blazing star, sunflowers, and Joe-Pye weed.

Many species of birds have also been spotted at Goose Creek. It is not uncommon to see hawks, meadowlarks, red-winged blackbirds and yellow warblers all in one visit.

== Gallery ==
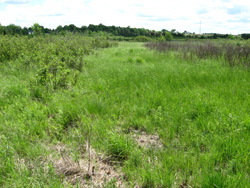
Landscape photograph of Goose Creek Grasslands Nature Sanctuary
