= Lakeville Swamp =

Lakeville Swamp Nature Sanctuary
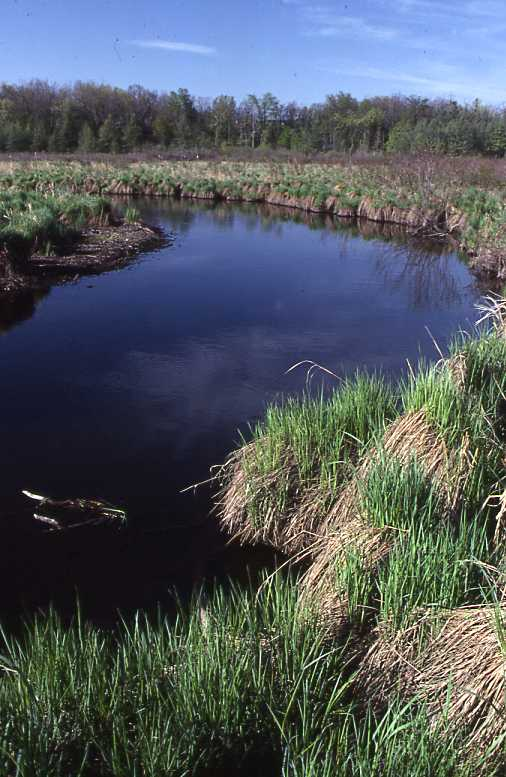
- Lakeville Swamp

- Location within Michigan
- Location: Lower Peninsula, Oakland County, Michigan USA
- Nearest city: Lakeville, Michigan
- Coordinates: 42°49′02″N 83°08′58″W
- Area: 76 acres (31 ha)
- Established: 1961
- Governing body: Michigan Nature Assoc. (non-profit)

Lakeville Swamp Nature Sanctuary is a 76-acre (31 ha) sanctuary located in northeastern Oakland County, Michigan. It is maintained and preserved by the Michigan Nature Association.

== About the Sanctuary ==
The Lakeville Swamp Nature Sanctuary was the Michigan Nature Association's fifth project. The acquisition of this property began in 1961.

As home to over 400 species of native plants, the Lakeville Swamp is Oakland County's most biologically diverse area. It also preserves several distinct kinds of habitats, including a dense White Cedar swamp. Several types of wildflowers can be seen at the Lakeville Swamp, such as marsh marigolds, Twinflower, and Clintonia. The sanctuary is easy to find, but difficult to traverse. Rattlesnakes, poison sumac, and unstable muck keep most people out. It is possible to get lost without the aid of a compass.
