= Klipfel =

James H. Klipfel Memorial Nature Sanctuary at Brockway Mountain
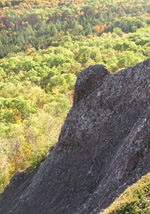
- View from James H. Klipfel Memorial Nature Sanctuary at Brockway Mountain

- Location within Michigan
- Location: Keweenaw County, Michigan, US
- Nearest city: Copper Harbor, Michigan
- Coordinates: 47°27′58″N 87°57′27″W
- Area: 160 acres (65 ha)
- Governing body: Michigan Nature Association

James H. Klipfel Memorial Nature Sanctuary at Brockway Mountain, commonly referred to as Klipfel or Klipfel Memorial, is a 160-acre (0.65 km^{2}) nature sanctuary located in Keweenaw County, Michigan. It is maintained and preserved by the Michigan Nature Association. The sanctuary is located near Copper Harbor on Brockway Mountain Drive. Brockway Mountain's alkaline bedrock outcrops, cliff faces, and many ledges create habitats for a variety of unusual plants, and spring hawk migrations can often be seen from the overlook at this sanctuary.

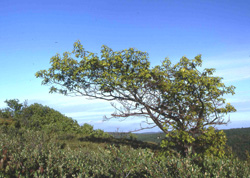
Skies at Klipfel
