= Black Creek Nature Sanctuary =

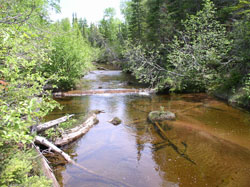

- Location within Michigan
- Location: Upper Peninsula, Keweenaw County, Michigan USA
- Nearest city: Calumet, Michigan
- Coordinates: 47.33123°N 88.46507°W
- Area: 242 acres (98 ha)
- Established: 1991
- Governing body: Michigan Nature Assoc. (non-profit)

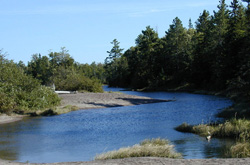
Black Creek Nature Sanctuary

Black Creek Nature Sanctuary, commonly referred to as Black Creek, is a 242-acre (98 ha) nature sanctuary located in Keweenaw County, Michigan. It is maintained and preserved by the non-profit organization Michigan Nature Association, and is only one of many parks and sanctuaries maintained by the association in Keweenaw County. The Black Creek Nature Sanctuary provides varied landscapes, several beaver ponds, sand dunes fringed by giant white birch, mixed conifers, lowland hardwoods, and 1,500 feet (460 m) of Lake Superior shoreline.

Starting in 1991, local citizens began purchasing land for preservation, and by 1992, a total of 241 acres (98 ha) were acquired. In 2006, the land along the lake's shoreline was added for the present size of 242 acres (98 ha).

Access to the sanctuary is by a hiking trail of more than two miles (3 km) in length, and traverses a variety of environments. Vegetation includes blueberry, trailing arbutus, and wildflowers such as orchids. The trail ends at a lagoon formed by the convergence of Hill and Black Creeks where they empty into Lake Superior. Hill Creek flows through several feet of old stamp sand left over from the copper mining era in the 1860s. The rock bearing the copper was crushed, or "stamped", to remove the ore, hence the term "stamp sand".

A small footpath marks the entrance to Black Creek near the end of Sedar Road between Calumet and Allouez. The trail will take you to the Lake Superior shoreline as well as the beaver marshes, dune habitat, and conifers that surround the creeks.
