= Philo D. Beckwith =

American politician

P.D. (Philo D.) Beckwith (1825–1889) was the founder of Round Oak Stove Company (later officially known as the Estate of P.D. Beckwith Inc.) and Mayor of Dowagiac, Michigan.

Born March 6, 1825 in Allegany County, N.Y, Philo D. Beckwith settled in Dowagiac, Michigan in 1854 and opened a foundry. His experiments with heating stoves in the 1860s led to the reshaping of his foundry business from the roller grain drill to the heating stove. Beckwith cast his first stove around 1867 to heat his struggling foundry and shortly after, the Michigan Central Railroad ordered the heaters for its depots between Detroit and Chicago. By 1871, Beckwith had made heating stoves his primary product (though he would continue manufacturing grain drills until his death) and the Round Oak Stove Company was born.

Beckwith's company provided relatively high wages for the times and the, then, nearly unheard of benefit of sick pay. The town was, as a result, relatively insulated from the labor struggles occurring in the larger cities at the time.

Beckwith, was a committed freethinker who wanted to "make the townsfolk aware and appreciative of those his personal pantheon of heroes and heroines whom he considered to be the true benefactors of the human race".^{1} The theater busts included (extraordinary for the times) women and freethinkers such as Thomas Paine, Robert Ingersoll, Walt Whitman, Victor Hugo, George Sand and Voltaire among others.^{2}

The company expanded and Beckwith became a very popular man in town. He served as mayor for much of the 1880s and he invested a great deal of money and energy into various philanthropic activities. Beckwith died in January 1889 at the age of 54, leaving the management of the firm to his son-in-law, Fred E. Lee.

Round Oak Stove Company officially became the Estate of P.D. Beckwith Incorporated after Beckwith’s death and continued expanding into the early 1900s. The company added new products, like furnaces and cooking stoves, and Round Oak produced a wide array of advertising materials. The success of the firm can be attributed to solid products and quality advertising.

Round Oak stayed strong into the 1920s and survived the Great Depression, though greatly damaged. World War II government contracts helped the company stave off elimination, but once the war ended, Round Oak was a troubled company. In 1947, the company sold its buildings to Kaizer-Frazer for the production of automobile engine parts and the Round Oak name was sold to Peerless Furnace, which continued to make repair parts for furnaces and stoves. A Round Oak comeback in Dowagiac in the early 1950s was short lived and Round Oak was left to history.

Today, Beckwith Estate or "Round Oak" Stoves are widely sought after collectibles.

^{1} Ingersoll: Immortal Infidel, ed. Roger E. Greeley (Buffalo, 1977), p. 127

^{2} Freethinkers, A History of American Secularism, Susan Jacoby (Owl Books, 2004) p. 149-150
