= Estivant Pines =

Nature sanctuary in Michigan, US

Estivant Pines Nature Sanctuary
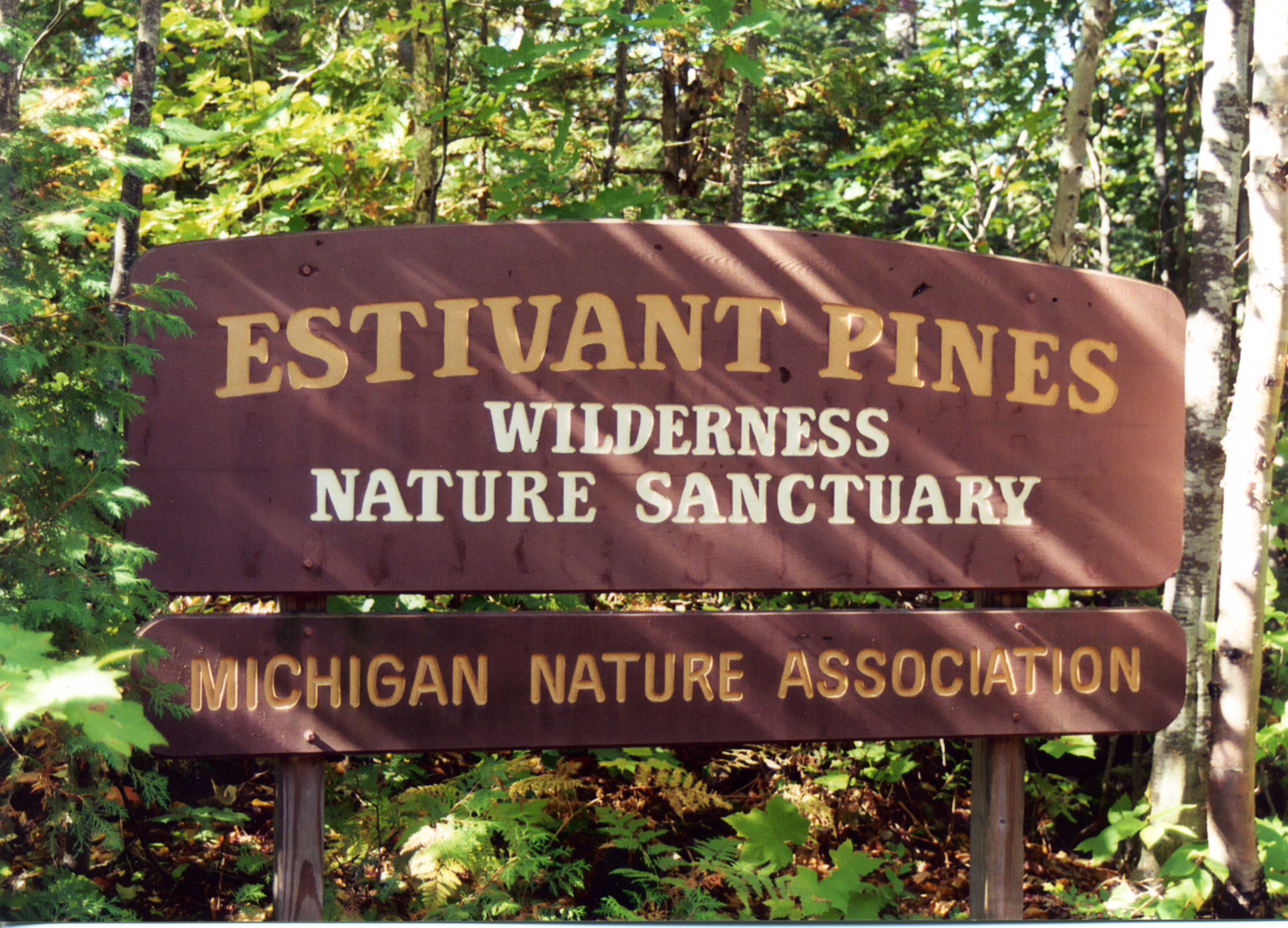
- Estivant Pines Nature Sanctuary sign

- Location within Michigan
- Location: Upper Peninsula, Keweenaw County, Michigan USA
- Nearest city: Copper Harbor, Michigan
- Coordinates: 47.44599°N 87.87746°W
- Area: 508 acres (206 ha)
- Established: 1973
- Governing body: Michigan Nature Assoc. (non-profit)

Estivant Pines Nature Sanctuary is a 508-acre (2.06 km^{2}) nature sanctuary in Keweenaw County, Michigan. It is maintained and preserved by the Michigan Nature Association.

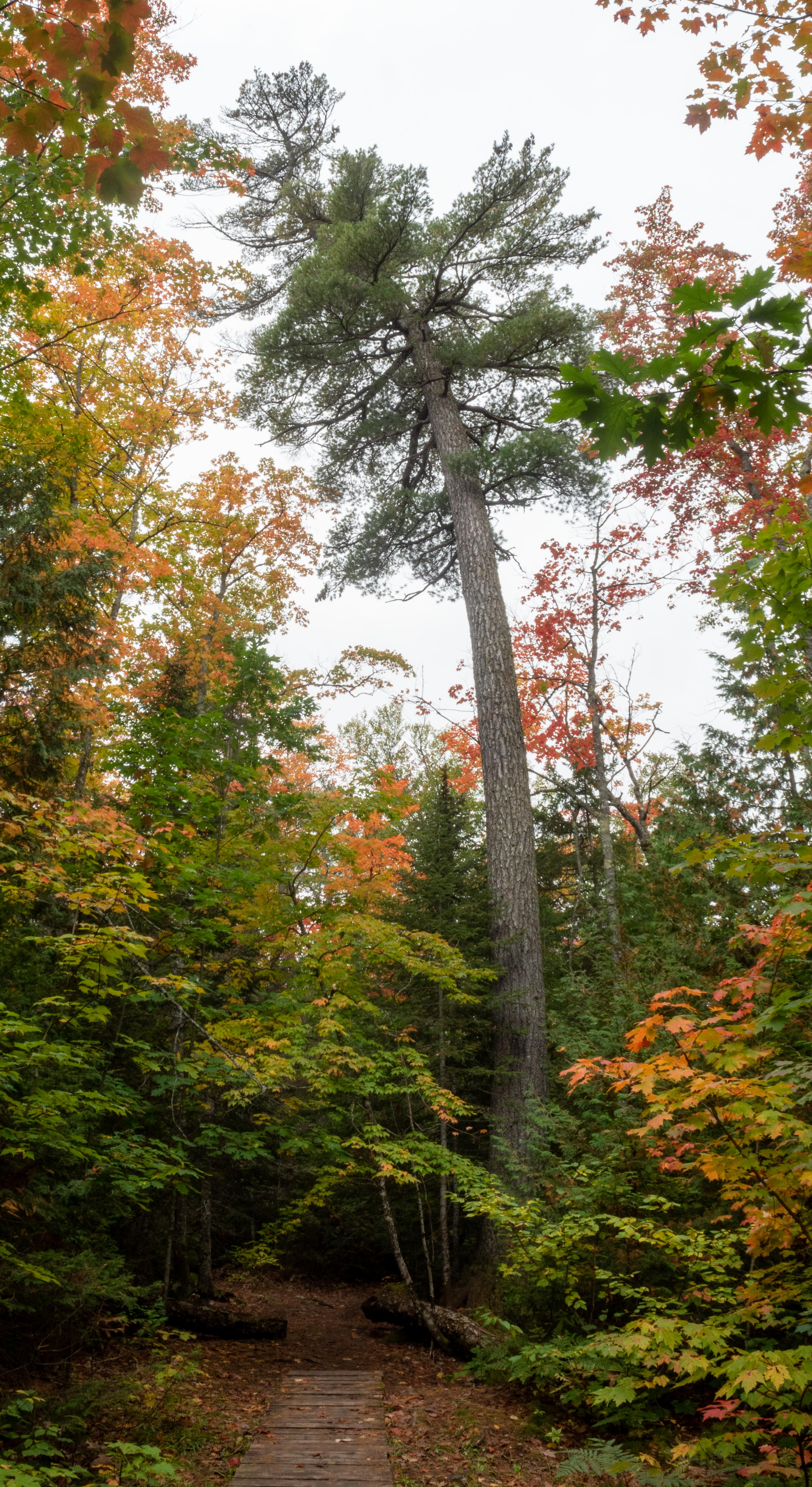
One of the larger white pine trees in the Sanctuary.

The area was originally part of a 2,400-acre tract of land owned by Edward Estivant of Paris, who sold it to Calumet and Hecla Mining Company in 1947. Universal Oil acquired the area in 1968, and soon logged 300 acres of nearby forest. A fund-raising campaign by the Michigan Nature Association lead in 1973 to the purchase of 200 acres from Universal Oil. Three subsequent acquisitions, between 1989 and 2005, have expanded the sanctuary to 510 acres. The area protects one of the last old-growth white pine (Pinus strobus) stands in Michigan. Two connected loop trails are in the sanctuary, the one-mile Cathedral Grove loop and the 1.2 mile Bertha Daubendiek trail.

The Sanctuary includes some white pines growing more than 125 feet tall and dating back over 300 years, having established after a fire in about 1695. The forest predominantly consists of sugar maple (Acer saccharum) and balsam fir (Abies balsamea), with the white pines appearing as emergent stems above the maple/fir canopy. There are a few understory white pine saplings, but these face competition with many other tree species before they can enter the canopy; it remains to be seen whether gap dynamics will allow this to occur.

More than 85 bird species have been inventoried in the sanctuary, including woodpeckers, hawks, and red crossbills. Despite thin soil and boreal climate, several wildflowers grow, such as asters, Clintonia, baneberry, and violets. A wide variety of ferns, like maidenhair, spleenwort, and holly fern, blanket the forest floor.
