= Dowagiac Woods =

Dowagiac Woods Nature Sanctuary
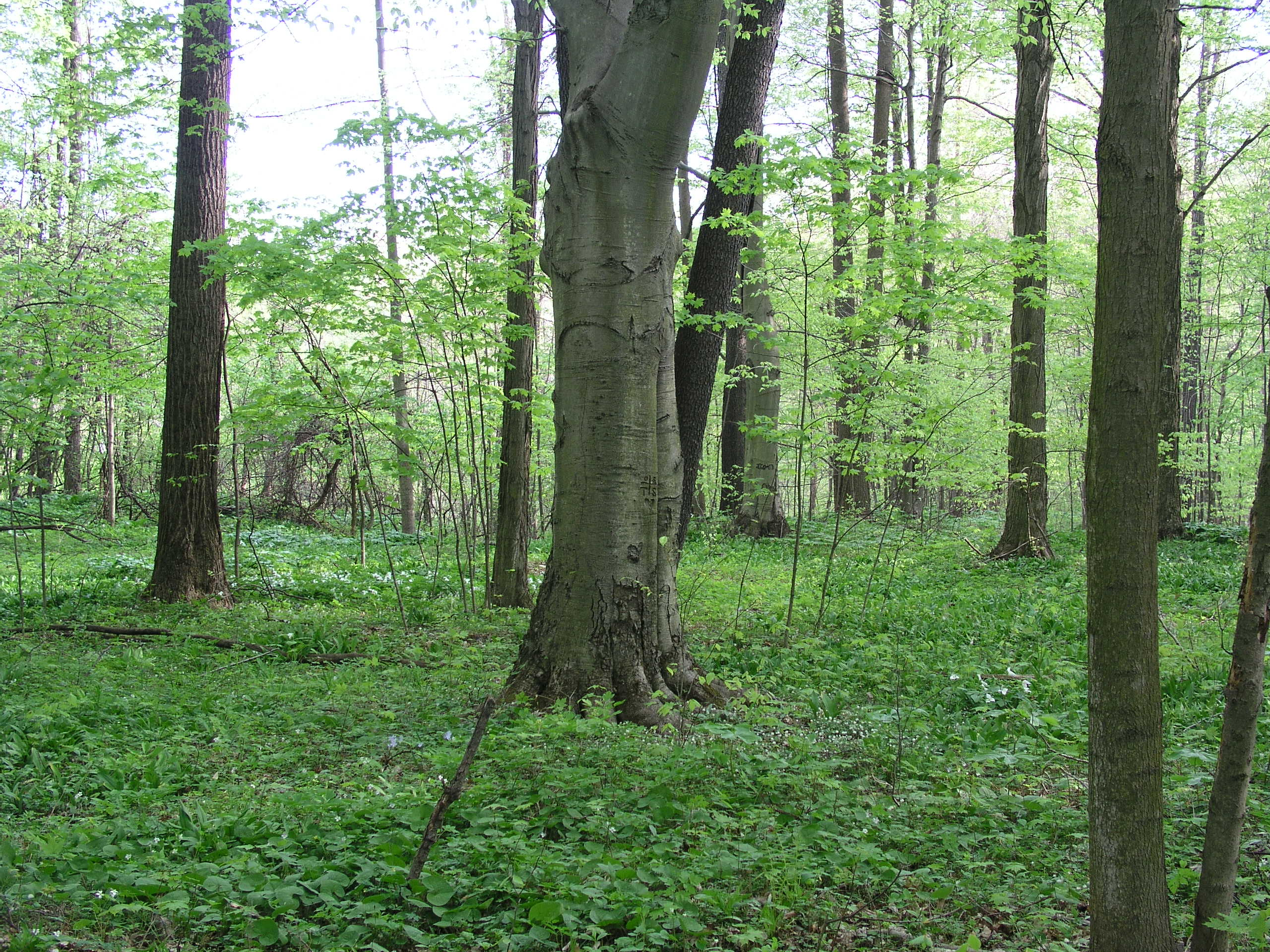
- Dowagiac Woods Nature Sanctuary

- Location within Michigan
- Location: Lower Peninsula, Cass County, Michigan USA
- Nearest city: Dowagiac, Michigan
- Coordinates: 41.97604°N 86.18225°W
- Area: 384 acres (155 ha)
- Established: 1981
- Governing body: Michigan Nature Assoc. (non-profit)

Dowagiac Woods Nature Sanctuary, commonly referred to as Dowagiac Woods, is a 384-acre (155 ha) woods located in Cass County, Michigan. It is maintained and preserved by the Michigan Nature Association, known as "MNA".

== History ==
These woods were virtually unknown even to those living nearby until 1975, when an MNA member reported that Blue-eyed Mary grew there. MNA made an appeal in 1981 for $110,000 to purchase the woods, and the campaign was completed in one year. More than 550 individual contributions were given, capped with a $20,000 grant from the Kresge Foundation.

In February 2009, MNA purchased adjacent acreage to expand Dowagiac Woods to 384 acres (155 ha). It is now MNA’s largest sanctuary in the Lower Peninsula.

== About the Sanctuary ==
Plants flourish at Dowagiac Woods in countless numbers. A top attraction in Dowagiac Woods is the abundance of blue-eyed Mary, Collinsia verna. More than 150 beds can be seen from the trail, each averaging ten by twenty feet square. More than fifty species of other wildflowers bloom in the spring, and nearly fifty kinds of trees have been found at Dowagiac Woods.

Dowagiac Woods is also home to many animals, including at least 49 different kinds of birds like the yellow warbler and ruffed grouse.

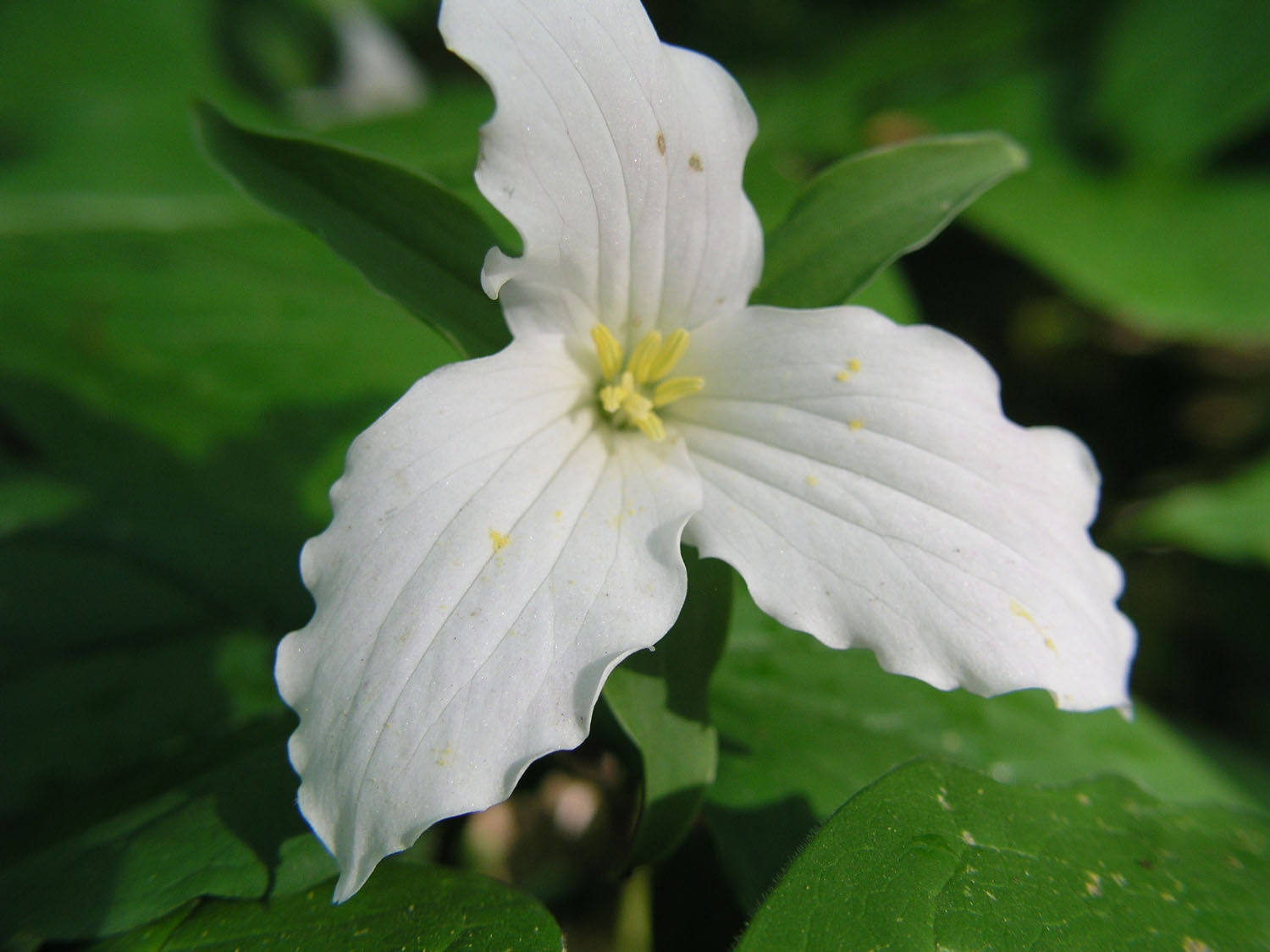
Trillium at Dowagiac Woods
