= Michigan Nature Association =

Nonprofit conservation organization

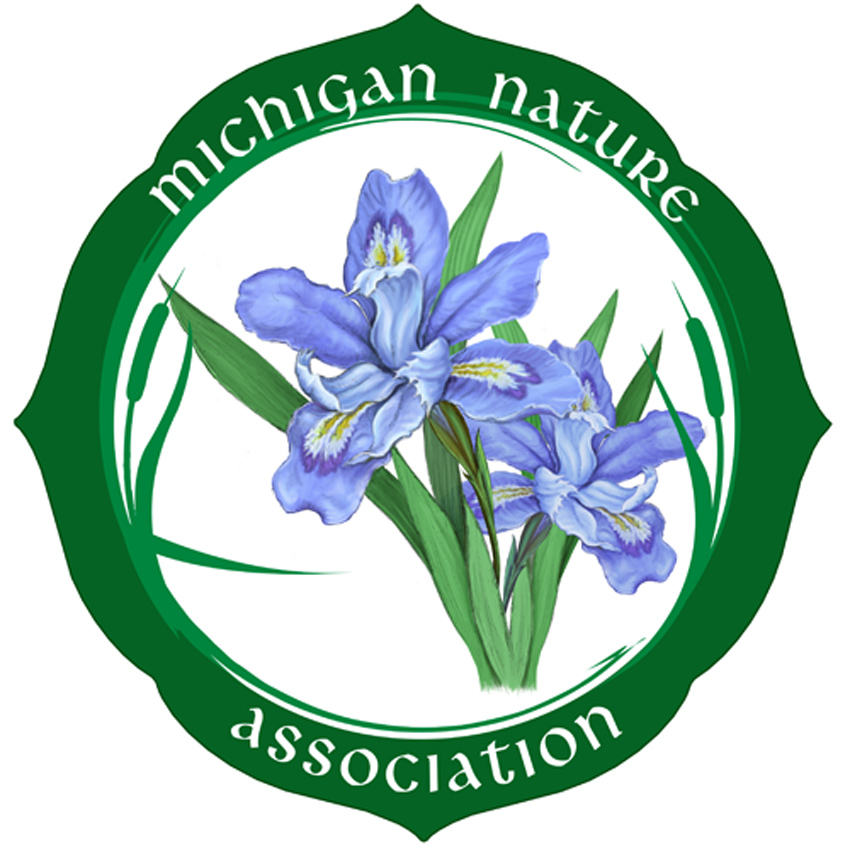
- Formation: 1952; 74 years ago
- Type: Nonprofit
- Tax ID no.: 38-6093404
- Legal status: 501(c)(3)
- Headquarters: Okemos, Michigan
- Location: United States
- Board President: Yu Man Lee
- Executive Director: Garret Johnson
- Conservation Scientist: Andrew Myers
- Conservation Director: Andrew Bacon
- Board of directors: Yu Man Lee; Kurt Brauer; Ruth Vail; Aubrey Golden; David Cartwright; Maureen McNulty Saxton; Brandon Schroeder; Margaret Welsch
- Website: https://www.michigannature.org/

Michigan Nature Association is a nonprofit conservation organization established in 1952. It has 176 nature sanctuaries in 58 counties throughout Michigan under its jurisdiction.

== History ==
In 1951, a bird study group in the Macomb County was formed to protect wildlife, hoping to keep Michigan in a natural state. Their first project was protesting the destruction of a tern colony at Metropolitan Beach. Calling themselves the St. Clair Metropolitan Beach Sanctuary Association, they started weekend nature exhibits, guided tours, and published a study course. In 1955, the Junior Nature Patrol (JNP) was formed. With this growth, the group began looking to expand and do further conservation work.

The first purchase of a sanctuary was made in 1960 and named Red Wing Acres. Further properties were obtained through persuasion with landholders, and by 1965, the group renamed itself the Eastern Michigan Nature Association. Expansion into Northern Michigan led to the current name change of the Michigan Nature Association (MNA) in 1970. That same year MNA helped write and campaign for the Natural Beauty Roads Act in Michigan, now known as Michigan's Natural Beauty Roads Act of 1970.

In 1974, founder Bertha Daubendiek was awarded the Outstanding Michigan Volunteer of the Year by Governor Milliken for her work with MNA. In 1979, MNA had secured its 50th sanctuary, with Daubendiek honored as Michigan resident of the Year by the Detroit News. The Michigan Women's Hall of Fame inducted Bertha Daubendiek in 1994 for her success launching her wild natural habitat projects.

During the years of 1986–87, Twin Waterfalls Nature Sanctuary became the Association's 100th property.

MNA relocated its office to Williamston, Michigan, a small town just outside the Lansing area in 2002, followed by another relocation move near the Michigan town of Okemos in 2014.

The Land Trust Accreditation Commission gave national accreditation to the Michigan Nature Association in 2014.

== Sanctuaries ==
Below are a few of MNA's sanctuaries listed by county:

County	Sanctuary
Alger	Twin Waterfalls Plant Preserve
Allegan	Lawrence A. and Mary Bell Wade Memorial Nature Sanctuary
Cass	Dowagiac Woods Nature Sanctuary
Clinton	A Looking Glass Sanctuary
Houghton	Robert T. Brown Nature Sanctuary
Huron	Kernan Memorial Nature Sanctuary
Jackson	Lefglen Nature Sanctuary
Keweenaw	Black Creek Nature Sanctuary; Estivant Pines Nature Sanctuary; James H. Klipfel Memorial Nature Sanctuary at Brockway Mountain
Lenawee	Goose Creek Grasslands Nature Sanctuary
Mackinac	Fred Dye Nature Sanctuary
Macomb	Wilcox Warnes Nature Sanctuary
Montcalm	George and Jessie Krum Memorial Plant Preserve
Newaygo	Karner Blue Nature Sanctuary
Oakland	Lakeville Swamp Nature Sanctuary
Oceana	Genevieve Casey Nature Sanctuary
St. Clair	Bertha A. Daubendiek Memorial Nature Sanctuary; Elmer P. & Irene Jasper Woods Memorial Nature Sanctuary

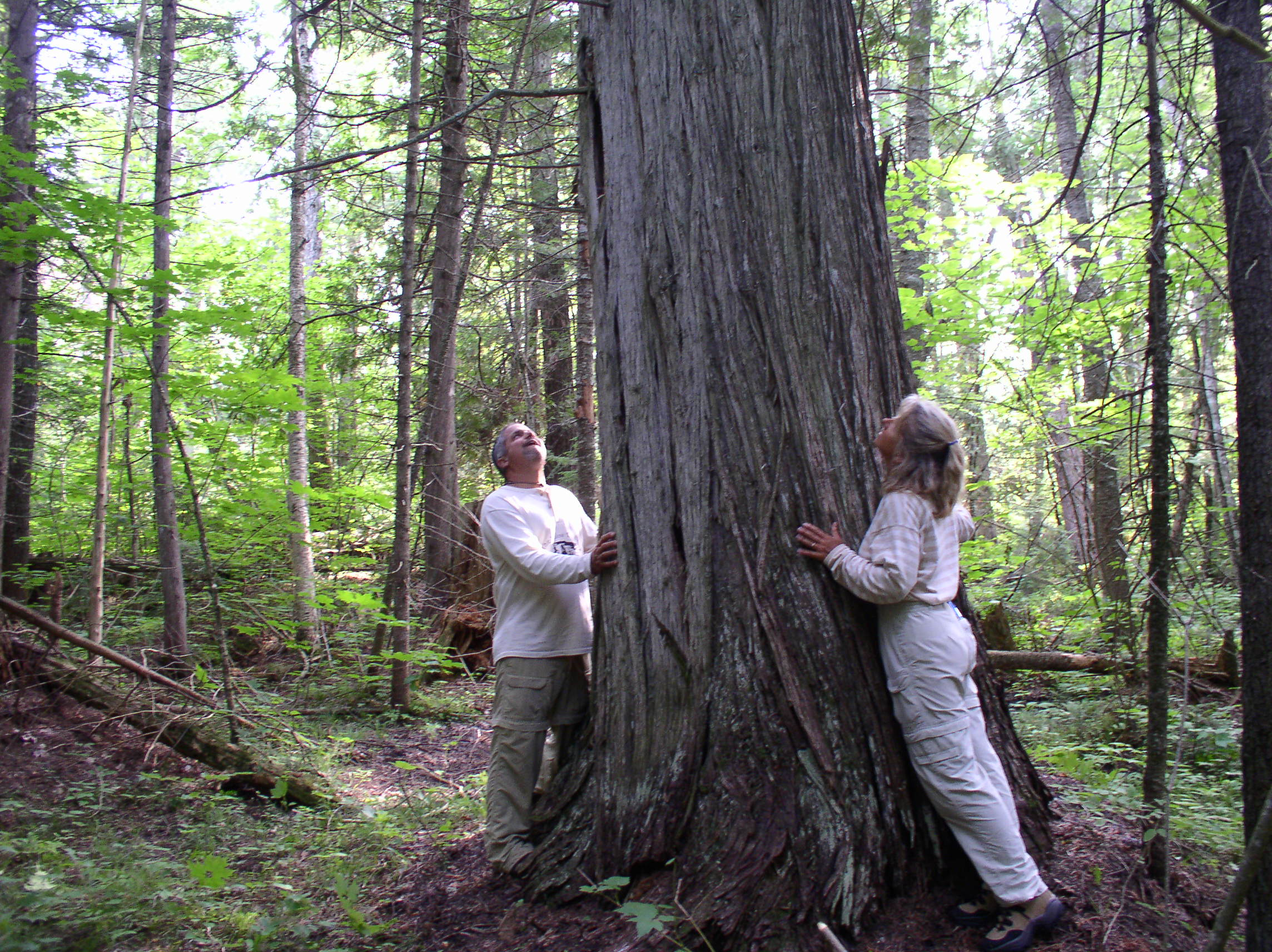
Estivant Pines Nature Sanctuary in Keweenaw County

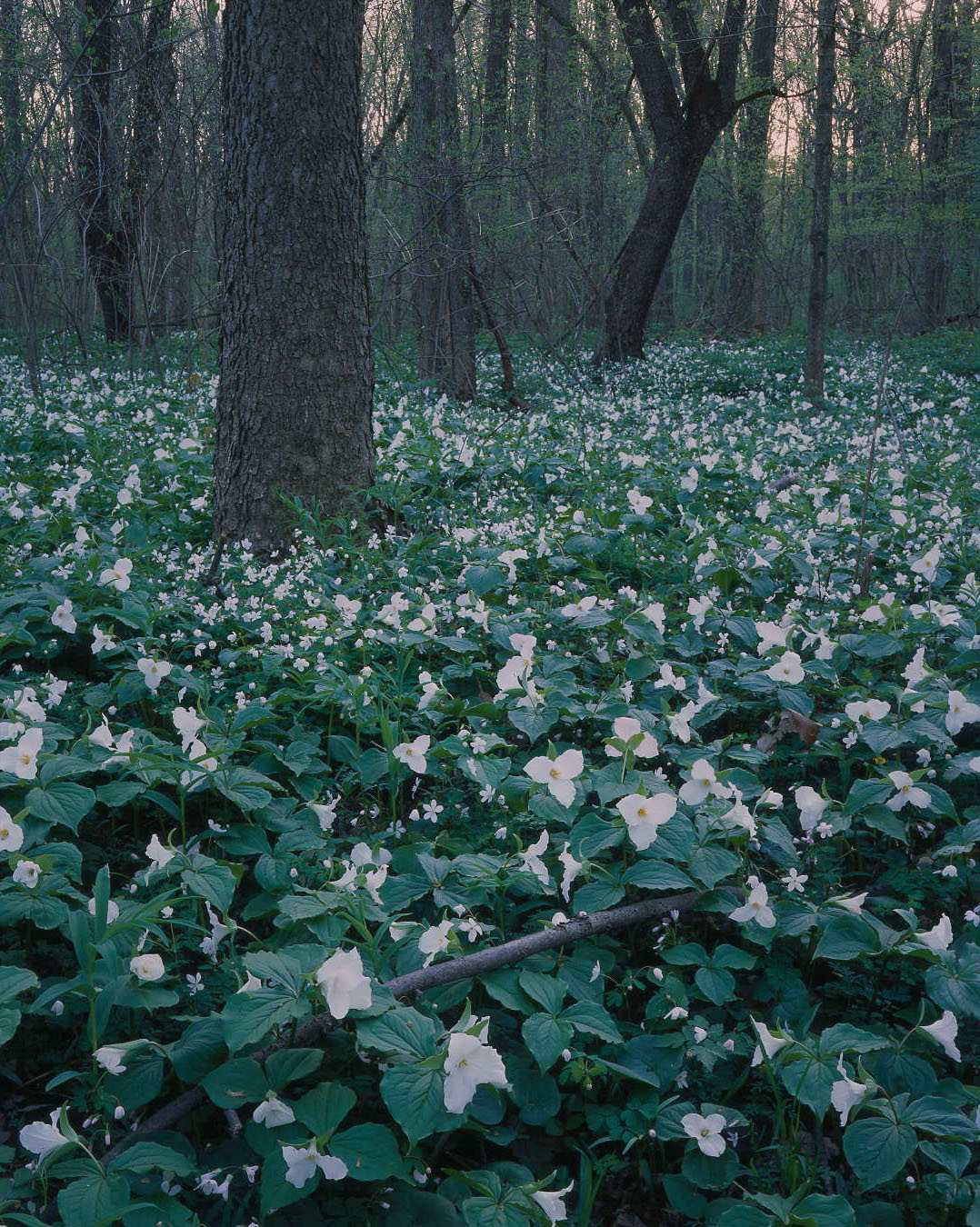
Dowagiac Woods Nature Sanctuary in Cass County

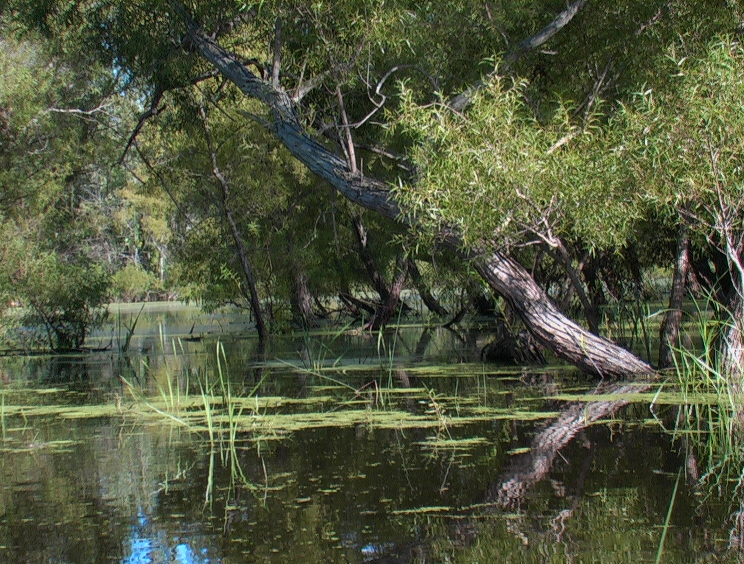
A Looking Glass Sanctuary in Clinton County

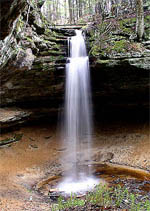
Twin Waterfalls Memorial Nature Sanctuary in Alger County

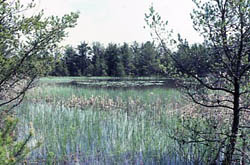
Lawrence A. and Mary Bell Wade Memorial Nature Sanctuary in Allegan County

== See also ==
- 1952 in the environment
