= Jasper Woods =

Nature sanctuary in Michigan, United States

Elmer P. & Irene Jasper Woods Memorial
- Location within Michigan
- Location: Lower Peninsula, St. Clair County, Michigan USA
- Nearest city: Marysville, Michigan
- Coordinates: 42.95694°N 82.58509°W
- Area: 49 acres (20 ha)
- Governing body: Michigan Nature Assoc. (non-profit)

Elmer P. & Irene Jasper Woods Memorial, commonly referred to as Jasper Woods, is a 49-acre (20 ha) nature sanctuary located in St. Clair County, Michigan in the United States. It is maintained and preserved by the Michigan Nature Association.

== History ==
Jasper Woods was acquired in 1977 from Elva Rabidue. Known then as Schenck Woods, the land had been in her family since 1869. She wanted to see it preserved for wildlife and was persuaded to sell it in a bargain sale. In 1982, it was renamed Jasper Woods as a memorial to Elmer and Irene Jasper who were founding members of the Michigan Nature Association and both served as officers and directors in its early years.

== About the Sanctuary ==
Jasper Woods is a northern-type woods primarily made up of hemlock, white pine, maples, oaks, white and yellow birches, and wild black cherry. The groves of hemlock are the most prominent feature.

Jasper Woods is home to three kinds of trillium, which bloom at slightly different times. Earliest is the red trillium, which blooms in early May, depending on spring weather conditions. Later comes the white trillium. In mid-to-late May the painted trillium, a Michigan Endangered species, blooms. It is found only in St. Clair County and Sanilac County.

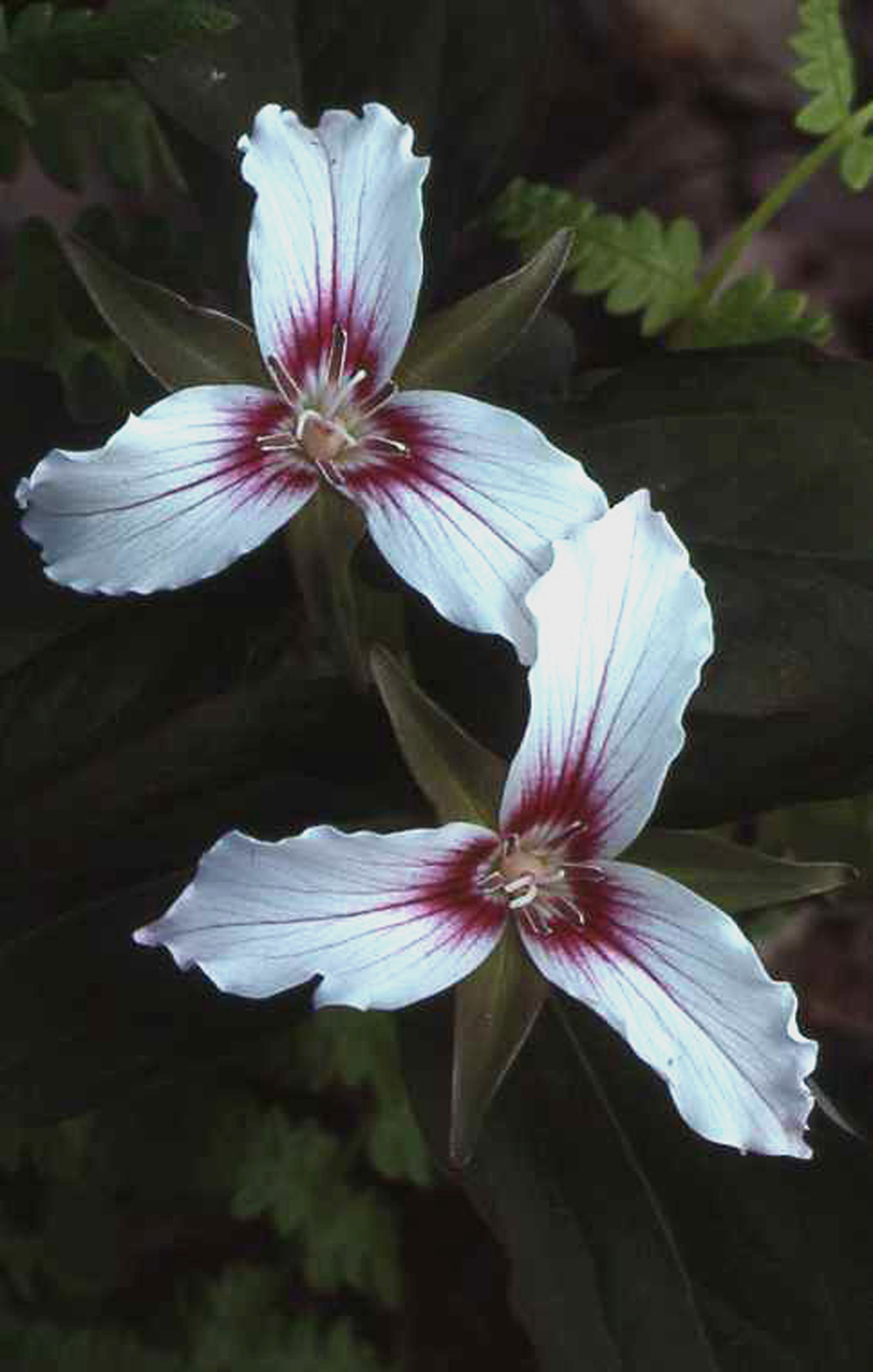
Painted trillium (Trillium undulatum) at Jasper Woods

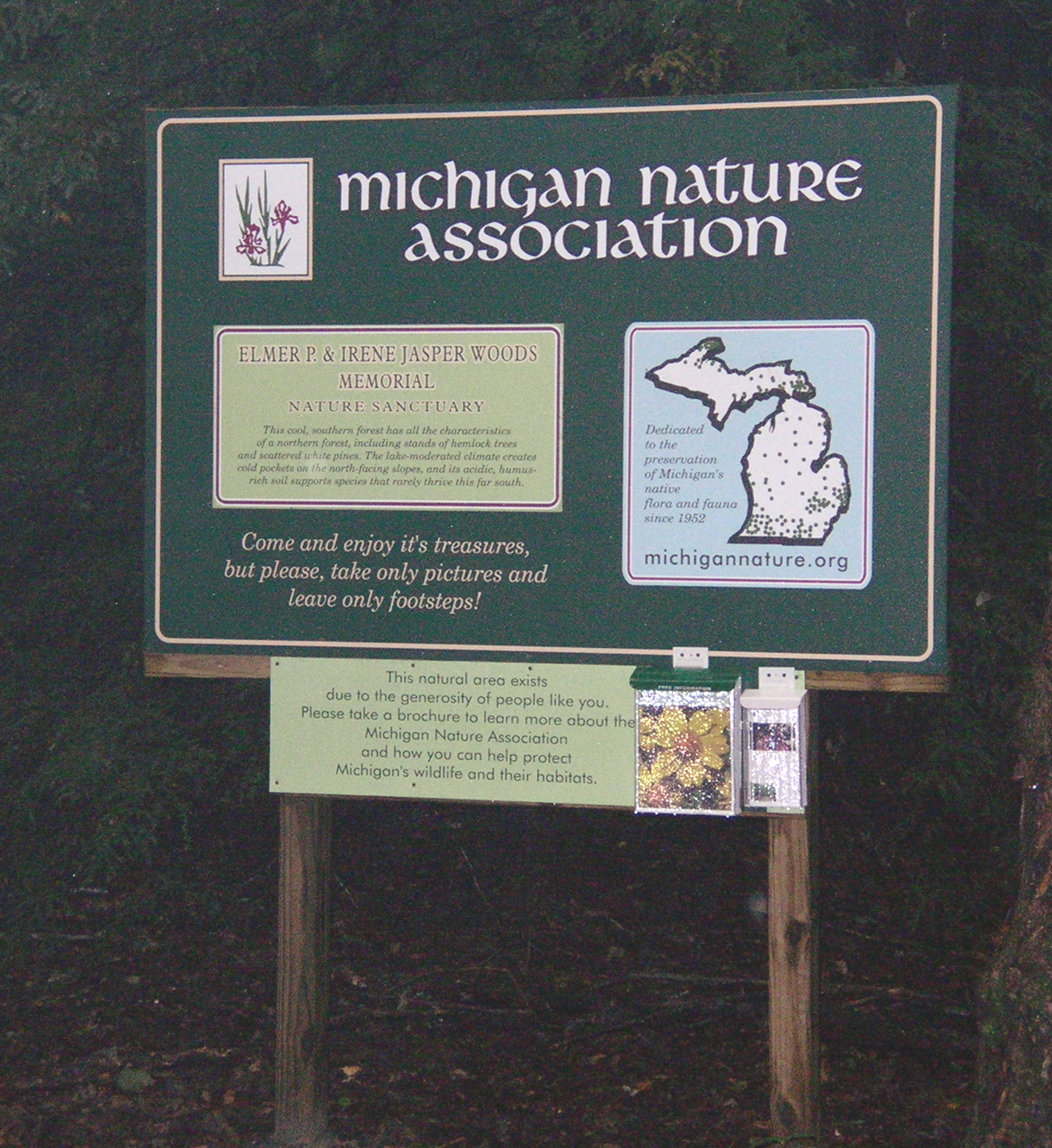
Entrance sign at Jasper Woods
