= Robert T. Brown Nature Sanctuary =

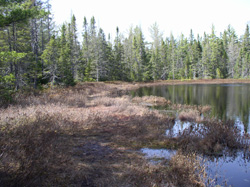
- Robert T. Brown Nature Sanctuary in springtime

- Location within Michigan
- Location: Upper Peninsula, Houghton County, Michigan USA
- Nearest city: Painesdale, Michigan
- Coordinates: 47°01′32″N 88°44′18″W
- Area: 19 acres (7.7 ha)
- Established: 2002
- Governing body: Michigan Nature Assoc. (non-profit)

Robert T. Brown Nature Sanctuary is a 19-acre (7.7 ha) sanctuary located in Houghton County, Michigan. It is maintained and preserved by the Michigan Nature Association.

== History ==
The late Dr. Robert Thorson Brown (1923–2002), for whom the sanctuary is named, was Professor of Biological Sciences at Michigan Technological University until his retirement in 1983. He was an expert in the identification of plants, mushrooms and lichens, which his research involved. He enjoyed teaching the complex interactions between organisms and often took his students on many field trips. Shortly before he died, Dr. Brown assisted in the selection of the site that is now this sanctuary.

== About the Sanctuary ==
The Brown Sanctuary is a northern wetland surrounded by a small pond and bordered by a black spruce, tamarack, and white cedar swamp. Several shrubs can be found in the sanctuary, including leather leaf, bog-rosemary, Labrador tea, and both small and large cranberry. Many carnivorous plants can be found in this fen, such as pitcher plant, round leaved sundew, and hidden fruited bladderwort. These unique plants capture and digest insects and other food to obtain the necessary nutrients.

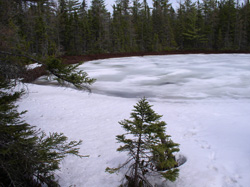
Robert T. Brown Nature Sanctuary in wintertime
