= Dowagiac, Michigan =

- City
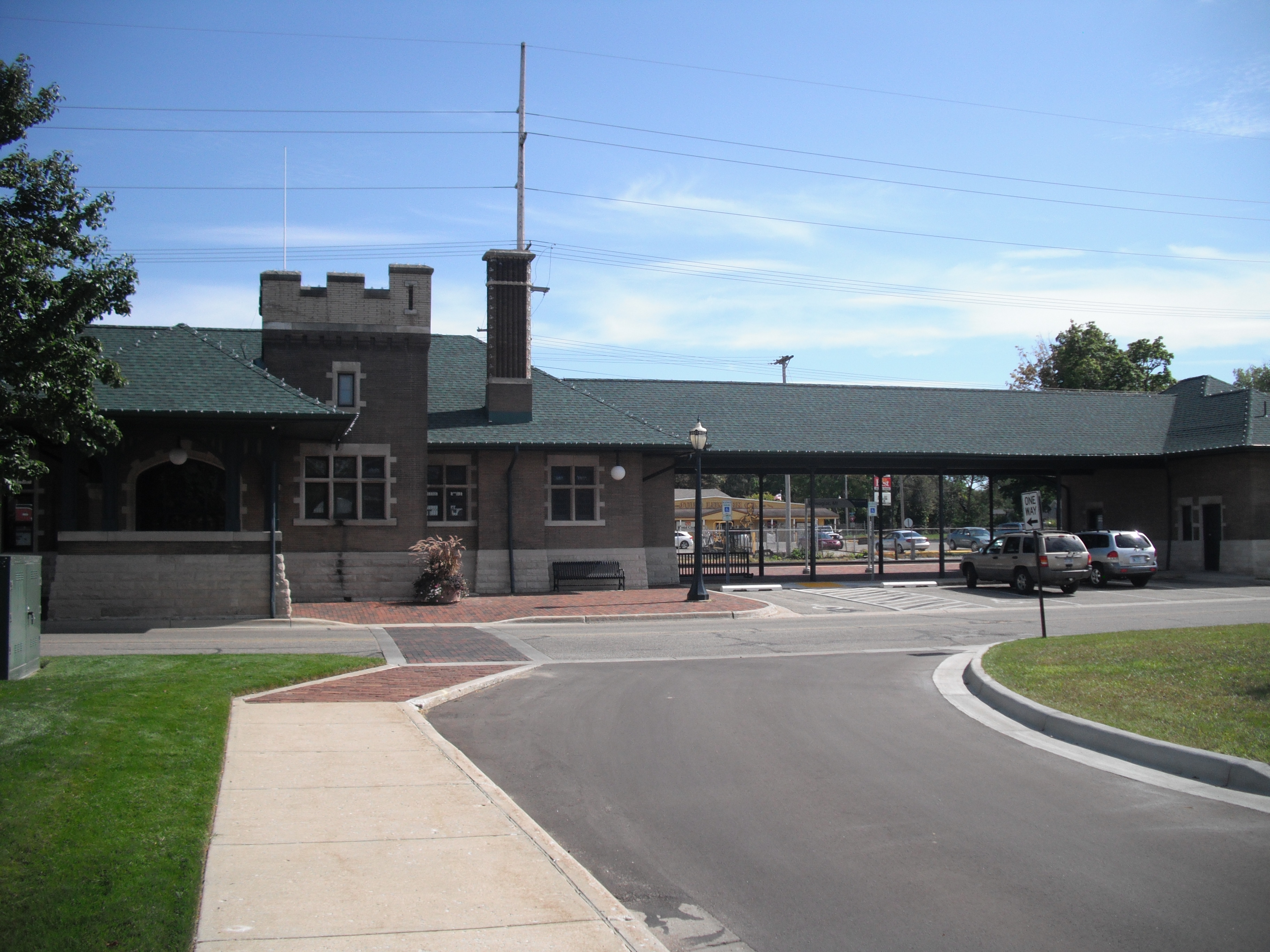
- The historic Dowagiac Station on Depot Drive

- Flag logo

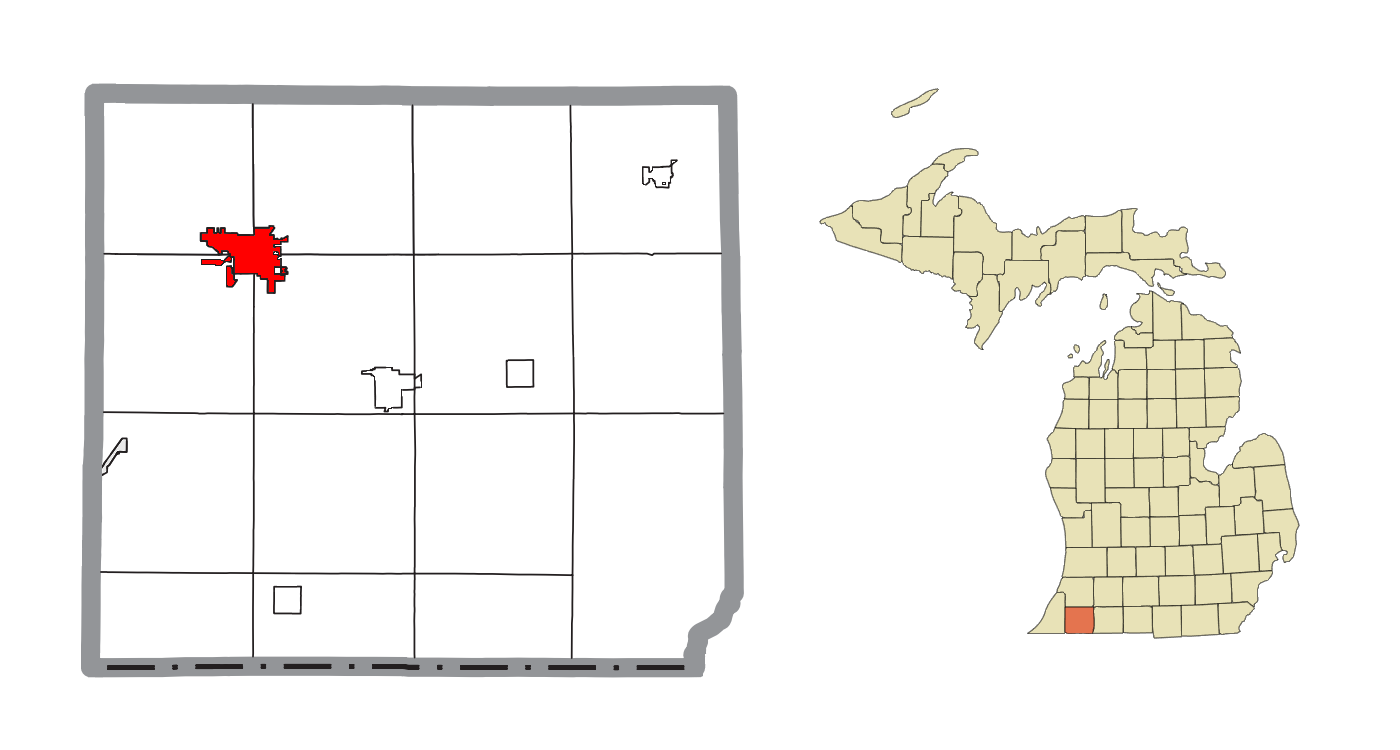
- Location within Cass County

- Location within the state of Michigan
- Coordinates: 41°59′03″N 86°06′31″W
- Country: United States
- State: Michigan
- County: Cass
- Platted: 1848
- Incorporated: 1863 (village); 1877 (city)

Government
  - Mayor: Patrick Bakeman

Area
  - Total: 4.53 sq mi (11.74 km^{2})
  - Land: 4.45 sq mi (11.53 km^{2})
  - Water: 0.077 sq mi (0.20 km^{2})
- Elevation: 761 ft (232 m)

Population (2020)
  - Total: 5,721
  - Density: 1,284.8/sq mi (496.05/km^{2})
- Time zone: UTC-5 (Eastern (EST))
  - Summer (DST): UTC-4 (EDT)
- ZIP Code: 49047
- Area code: 269
- FIPS code: 26-22880
- GNIS feature ID: 624843
- Website: www.cityofdowagiac.com

Dowagiac (/dəˈwɑːdʒæk/ də-WAH-jak, /dəˈwɑːʒæk/ də-WAH-zhak) is a city in Cass County in the U.S. state of Michigan. The population was 5,721 at the 2020 census. It is part of the South Bend-Mishawaka metropolitan area.

Dowagiac is situated at the corner of four townships: Wayne Township to the northeast, LaGrange Township to the southeast, Pokagon Township to the southwest, and Silver Creek Township to the northwest.

The city name comes from the Potawatomi word dewje'og meaning "fishing [near home] water". Dowagiac is the headquarters of the Pokagon Band of Potawatomi Indians and is also contained within the reservation.

== History ==
Dowagiac was first platted in 1848. It was incorporated as a village in 1863 and as a city in 1877. Dowagiac gained national attention in June 1964 after police began investigating multiple reports of what became known as the Dewey Lake Monster.

In 1854, Dowagiac was the final destination for the first group of orphans brought to the Midwest from New York City on the Orphan Train.

== Geography ==
According to the United States Census Bureau, the city has a total area of 4.54 square miles (11.76 km^{2}), of which 4.46 square miles (11.55 km^{2}) is land and 0.08 square miles (0.21 km^{2}) is water.

Dowagiac Woods Nature Sanctuary, commonly referred to as Dowagiac Woods, a 235 acres (0.95 km^{2}) woods located in Cass, is a non-profit organization dedicated to protecting Michigan's exceptional natural habitats and extraordinary and endangered plants and animals.

The Dowagiac River flows from the stream which rises as the "Dowagiac Drain" in central Decatur Township in southern Van Buren County, Michigan. It is joined first by the "Red Run" and then by the "Lake of the Woods Drain" near the southern edge of Hamilton Township, it becomes the "Dowagiac River" before entering Wayne Township in Cass County. North of the city of Dowagiac, the river passes through the "Dowagiac Swamp". Just west of Dowagiac, the river is joined by its principal tributary, the "Dowagiac Creek".

=== Climate ===
Climate data for Dowagiac, Michigan (1991–2020 normals, extremes 1953–present)
Month	Jan	Feb	Mar	Apr	May	Jun	Jul	Aug	Sep	Oct	Nov	Dec	Year
Record high °F (°C)	63 (17)	72 (22)	85 (29)	89 (32)	95 (35)	103 (39)	103 (39)	100 (38)	99 (37)	88 (31)	77 (25)	72 (22)	103 (39)
Mean daily maximum °F (°C)	31.1 (−0.5)	34.2 (1.2)	44.4 (6.9)	57.4 (14.1)	68.6 (20.3)	78.0 (25.6)	81.5 (27.5)	79.7 (26.5)	73.5 (23.1)	60.9 (16.1)	47.2 (8.4)	36.2 (2.3)	57.7 (14.3)
Daily mean °F (°C)	23.7 (−4.6)	25.9 (−3.4)	34.8 (1.6)	46.4 (8.0)	57.9 (14.4)	67.4 (19.7)	70.8 (21.6)	69.0 (20.6)	62.1 (16.7)	50.3 (10.2)	39.0 (3.9)	29.4 (−1.4)	48.1 (8.9)
Mean daily minimum °F (°C)	16.2 (−8.8)	17.6 (−8.0)	25.2 (−3.8)	35.5 (1.9)	47.1 (8.4)	56.9 (13.8)	60.0 (15.6)	58.2 (14.6)	50.6 (10.3)	39.7 (4.3)	30.8 (−0.7)	22.5 (−5.3)	38.4 (3.6)
Record low °F (°C)	−21 (−29)	−23 (−31)	−13 (−25)	6 (−14)	19 (−7)	30 (−1)	38 (3)	36 (2)	26 (−3)	13 (−11)	4 (−16)	−20 (−29)	−23 (−31)
Average precipitation inches (mm)	3.10 (79)	2.41 (61)	2.44 (62)	3.69 (94)	4.19 (106)	4.26 (108)	4.09 (104)	4.12 (105)	3.38 (86)	4.33 (110)	2.90 (74)	2.82 (72)	41.73 (1,060)
Average precipitation days (≥ 0.01 in)	15.0	11.5	10.2	11.4	11.8	10.3	9.2	9.2	9.0	11.1	11.4	13.2	133.3
Source: NOAA

== Demographics ==
Historical population
Census	Pop.	Note	%±
1860	1,181		—
1870	1,932		63.6%
1880	2,100		8.7%
1890	2,806		33.6%
1900	4,151		47.9%
1910	5,088		22.6%
1920	5,440		6.9%
1930	5,550		2.0%
1940	5,007		−9.8%
1950	6,542		30.7%
1960	7,208		10.2%
1970	6,583		−8.7%
1980	6,307		−4.2%
1990	6,409		1.6%
2000	6,147		−4.1%
2010	5,879		−4.4%
2020	5,721		−2.7%
U.S. Decennial Census

=== 2020 census ===
As of the 2020 census, Dowagiac had a population of 5,721. The median age was 35.4 years. 26.7% of residents were under the age of 18 and 15.6% of residents were 65 years of age or older. For every 100 females there were 91.8 males, and for every 100 females age 18 and over there were 86.6 males age 18 and over.

98.8% of residents lived in urban areas, while 1.2% lived in rural areas.

There were 2,387 households in Dowagiac, of which 32.2% had children under the age of 18 living in them. Of all households, 29.6% were married-couple households, 21.3% were households with a male householder and no spouse or partner present, and 39.3% were households with a female householder and no spouse or partner present. About 35.3% of all households were made up of individuals and 15.6% had someone living alone who was 65 years of age or older.

There were 2,599 housing units, of which 8.2% were vacant. The homeowner vacancy rate was 2.7% and the rental vacancy rate was 4.3%.

Racial composition as of the 2020 census
Race	Number	Percent
White	3,888	68.0%
Black or African American	785	13.7%
American Indian and Alaska Native	160	2.8%
Asian	20	0.3%
Native Hawaiian and Other Pacific Islander	6	0.1%
Some other race	179	3.1%
Two or more races	683	11.9%
Hispanic or Latino (of any race)	444	7.8%

=== 2010 census ===
As of the census of 2010, there were 5,879 people, 2,337 households, and 1,463 families residing in the city. The population density was 1,318.2 inhabitants per square mile (509.0/km^{2}). There were 2,674 housing units at an average density of 599.6 per square mile (231.5/km^{2}). The racial makeup of the city was 73.5% White, 14.3% African American, 3.0% Native American, 0.8% Asian, 2.4% from other races, and 6.1% from two or more races. Hispanic or Latino of any race were 5.4% of the population.

There were 2,337 households, of which 36.6% had children under the age of 18 living with them, 34.6% were married couples living together, 22.1% had a female householder with no husband present, 5.9% had a male householder with no wife present, and 37.4% were non-families. 30.9% of all households were made up of individuals, and 13% had someone living alone who was 65 years of age or older. The average household size was 2.50 and the average family size was 3.14.

The median age in the city was 32 years. 29.1% of residents were under the age of 18; 10.4% were between the ages of 18 and 24; 25.5% were from 25 to 44; 22.3% were from 45 to 64; and 12.6% were 65 years of age or older. The gender makeup of the city was 47.6% male and 52.4% female.

=== 2000 census ===
As of the census of 2000, there were 6,147 people, 2,421 households, and 1,542 families residing in the city. The population density was 1,530.8 inhabitants per square mile (591.0/km^{2}). There were 2,631 housing units at an average density of 655.2 per square mile (253.0/km^{2}). The racial makeup of the city was 76.95% White, 15.63% African American, 2.02% Native American, 0.57% Asian, 1.59% from other races, and 3.24% from two or more races. Hispanic or Latino of any race were 2.49% of the population.

There were 2,421 households, out of which 32.8% had children under the age of 18 living with them, 40.1% were married couples living together, 18.7% had a female householder with no husband present, and 36.3% were non-families. 31.9% of all households were made up of individuals, and 15.4% had someone living alone who was 65 years of age or older. The average household size was 2.43 and the average family size was 3.06.

In the city, the population was spread out, with 28.1% under the age of 18, 9.7% from 18 to 24, 27.4% from 25 to 44, 19.4% from 45 to 64, and 15.4% who were 65 years of age or older. The median age was 34 years. For every 100 females, there were 91.8 males. For every 100 females age 18 and over, there were 85.4 males.

The median income for a household in the city was $29,926, and the median income for a family was $33,443. Males had a median income of $28,534 versus $22,282 for females. The per capita income for the city was $16,659. About 14.3% of families and 17.8% of the population were below the poverty line, including 25.6% of those under age 18 and 12.8% of those aged 65 or over.

== Transportation ==
=== Air ===
Dowagiac Municipal Airport has a 4,700-foot (1,400 m) long paved runway for private pilots with a turf runway as well.

=== Highways ===
The city is at the junction of M-51 and M-62. M-51 connects with Niles 17 miles (27 km) to the southwest and with I-94 21 miles (34 km) to the northeast. M-62 connects with Cassopolis eight miles (13 km) to the southeast and with M-140 nine miles (14 km) to the west.

=== Bus ===
One of the oldest dial-a-ride services in Michigan, Dowagiac DART began service in June 1975 with a three-bus fleet. The service is provided to the community of Dowagiac with service extended out to Southwest Michigan College. The service is provided by the city administration and is operated from a multi-modal terminal located on an Amtrak line. In its former life, the building was originally a Michigan Central, and later a Penn Central, train station. The building has been preserved and is maintained by the City of Dowagiac.

=== Rail ===
Dowagiac is served by Amtrak trains with daily service to Chicago and Detroit. The historic depot is located at 200 Depot Drive in the downtown area. Baggage cannot be checked at this location; however, up to two suitcases in addition to any personal items such as briefcases, purses, laptop bags, and infant equipment are allowed aboard as carry-ons. Also, this historical train depot is where the first orphans from the orphan train were dropped off and adopted.

== Education ==
Dowagiac is served by the Dowagiac Union School District, consisting of the following schools:

- Justus Gage Elementary
- Kincheloe Elementary
- Patrick Hamilton Elementary
- Sister Lakes Elementary
- Dowagiac Middle School
- Dowagiac Union High School

Dowagiac is also home to Southwestern Michigan College. SMC is a two-year school that offers on-campus housing.

== Notable people ==
- Dave Behrman – Michigan State and Buffalo Bills football player, AFL and NFL first-round draft pick in 1963
- Philo D. Beckwith – Founder of Round Oak Stove Company and Mayor of Dowagiac
- Dickinson Bishop – Businessman and Titanic sinking survivor
- David Cargo – Governor of New Mexico 1967–71
- Wally Fromhart—Notre Dame football player
- Billi Gordon – Model, actor, author, screenwriter, Doctor of Functional Human Brain Research
- James Heddon – Inventor of the artificial fishing lure
- Sean Hill – NFL player
- Judith Ivey – Tony Award-winning actress
- Franz Jackson – Saxophonist and clarinet player
- Sneaky Pete Kleinow – Pedal steel guitarist, member of The Flying Burrito Brothers and session musician
- John P. Metras – inducted into the Canadian Football Hall of Fame as a coach
- Webb Miller – Pulitzer Prize-nominated journalist and author
- Caleb Murphy – Ferris State Football player and NFL Tennessee Titans Football Player
- Adolph Otto Niedner – Custom gunsmith and wildcat cartridge inventor and Mayor of Dowagiac
- Carrie Newcomer – Singer-songwriter
- Irving J. Phillipson – US Army major general
- Kenneth Porter – World War I pilot, credited with 5 enemy aircraft destroyed
- Donavon F. Smith – World War II pilot and USAF lieutenant general, credited with 5.5 enemy aircraft destroyed
- William Alden Smith – US Senator
- Chris Taylor – wrestler, Olympic medalist
- Emery Valentine – Alaskan statesman and businessman
