= M-152 (Michigan highway) =

State highway in Van Buren and Cass counties in Michigan, United States

M-152
- M-152 highlighted in red

Route information
- Maintained by MDOT
- Length: 7.701 mi (12.394 km)
- Existed: 1933–present

Major junctions
- West end: Van Buren–Berrien county line
- East end: M-51 north of Dowagiac

Location
- Country: United States
- State: Michigan
- Counties: Van Buren, Cass

Highway system
- Michigan State Trunkline Highway System; Interstate; US; State; Byways
← M-151	→ M-153

M-152 is a state trunkline highway in the US state of Michigan in Cass and Van Buren counties. The highway runs through the Sister Lakes area providing access to the lake cabins and adjoining farmlands. The highway has existed mostly unchanged since the designation was commissioned in the 1930s.

== Route description ==
M-152 begins at an intersection with South County Line Road on the border between Van Buren and Berrien counties just west of Round Lake. Known as 92nd Avenue, M-152 travels due east past the Sister Lakes area before turning south on 66th Street. From there, the road passes between Dewey and Magician Lakes before returning to its easterly course where it assumes the name Dewey Lake Street. Between the western terminus and Dewey Lake Street, the highway passes provides access to the cabins around the lakes. The route continues eastward for nearly 3.5 miles (5.6 km) through farmland before terminating at a junction with M-51. M-152 is not on the National Highway System, a system of regionally important highways. In a traffic survey by the Michigan Department of Transportation (MDOT) in 2024, the average traffic on the highway was 3,637 vehicles per day, and 120 commercial vehicles per day.

== History ==
Route planning for the highway began in 1931. M-152 was assumed into the state trunkline system in 1933. Aside from completing the pavement surfacing of the road in 1945, the route is in the same configuration since then. The highway has been considered a potential candidate for transfer to local control. MDOT marked it as a "proposed transfer" in its Control Section Atlas in 1978.

== Major intersections ==
County	Location	mi	km	Destinations	Notes
Van Buren	Keeler Township	0.000	0.000	South County Line Road; Napier Avenue	Berrien–Van Buren county line; roadway continues westward as Napier Avenue
		2.912	4.686	Van Buren–Cass county line	
Cass	Silver Creek Township	7.701	12.394	M-51 – Decatur, Dowagiac	
1.000 mi = 1.609 km; 1.000 km = 0.621 mi
