= List of U.S. Highways in Michigan =

United States Numbered Highways of the State Trunkline Highway System
- Highway markers from different years for former US Highway 102 (1926), former US Highway 16 (1948), and current US Highway 23 (1973)
- US Highways in Michigan highlighted in red

System information
- Maintained by MDOT
- Length: 2,299.653 mi (3,700.933 km) Plus 159.621 mi (256.885 km) of business routes
- Formed: November 11, 1926

Highway names
- US Highways: US Highway nn (US nn)
- Special Routes: Alternate US Highway nn (US nnA); Business US Highway nn (Bus. US nn); Bypass US Highway nn (Byp. US nn); Truck US Highway nn (Truck US nn)

System links
- Michigan State Trunkline Highway System; Interstate; US; State; Byways

The US Highways in Michigan are the segments of the national United States Numbered Highway System that are owned and maintained by the state of Michigan, totaling 2,300 miles (3,701 km). The longest of these is US Highway 23 (US 23) at around 362 miles (583 km). On a national level, the standards and numbering for the system are handled by the American Association of State Highway and Transportation Officials (AASHTO), while the highways in Michigan are maintained by the Michigan Department of Transportation (MDOT).

The original highways were approved on November 11, 1926, by AASHTO including 14 mainline highways. A handful of these original highway designations no longer run within Michigan, and a few numbers have been added since the 1930s. Since 1999, there have been 13 mainline highways, and with the creation of a business route for Constantine, there are a total of 30 special routes in the state. Several highways have been converted to freeways, some of which are now Interstate Highways and no longer part of the US Highway System. These freeway conversions started in the 1940s and 1950s and continued through to the turn of the 21st century.

== Description ==
MDOT is the agency responsible for the day-to-day maintenance and operations of the State Trunkline Highway System, which includes the U.S. Highways in Michigan. The numbering for these highways is coordinated through AASHTO, an organization composed of the various state departments of transportation in the United States. Under the scheme finalized in 1926, two-digit US Highways are numbered in a grid; east–west highways have even numbers while north–south routes have odd numbers. The lowest numbers are in the east and the north. The east–west highways in Michigan number in the single digits up to the low 20s. The north–south highways range from the low 20s into the 40s. There are also three three-digit highways numbered in the 100s and one in the 200s as branches of related two-digit highways.

In Michigan, the US Highway System covers about 2,300 miles (3,701 km) of mainline highways and another 160 miles (257 km) of special routes. There are 13 mainline highways and 30 special routes in total, including one business route that is unsigned. Two of the mainline highways in the Upper Peninsula exit the state and re-enter, resulting in two discontinuous segments of highway for each in Michigan. The longest US Highway in the state is US Highway 23 (US 23) at just over 362 miles (583 km) spanning from the Ohio state line north to the Straits of Mackinac in the Lower Peninsula, while the shortest is the 2.3-mile (3.7 km) segment of US 8 south of Norway in Dickinson County. Special routes range in length from about 1 1/4 miles (2.0 km) for Business US 2 (Bus. US 2) in Ironwood to 10 miles (16 km) for Bus. US 131 in Kalamazoo.

== History ==
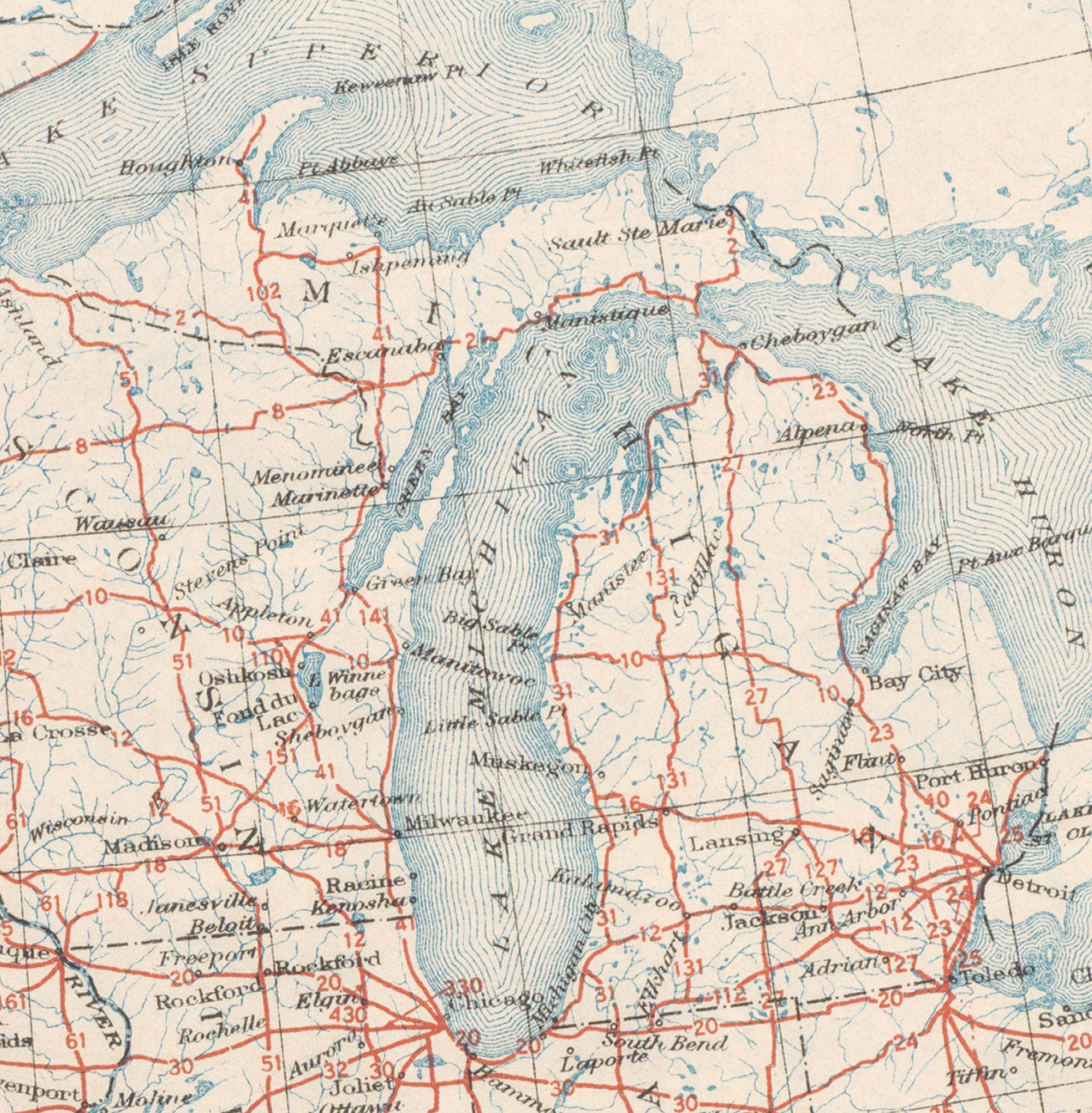
US Highway number assignments on November 11, 1926, in Michigan

The US Highway System was approved on November 11, 1926. At the time, 14 mainline highways were designated in Michigan. Just two years later on November 12, 1928, US 102 was renumbered as part of an extended US 141, and the former designation was decommissioned. Since then, another four designations were added in the state during the 1930s. One of these, US 112S was a suffixed, directional branch of the US 112 mainline; it was removed a few years after being designated in 1931. Around the same time period, the first alternate routes were designated, numbered with an "A" suffix. (Note: US 27A was created in 1929, US 12A in 1931, US 31A in 1932, and US 16A in 1933.)

During World War II, the Michigan State Highway Department (MSHD) (Note: The Michigan State Highway Department was reorganized into the Michigan Department of State Highways and Transportation on August 23, 1973, and the name was later shortened to its current form in 1978.) built the Willow Run Expressway to carry workers from Detroit to the defense plants at Willow Run Airport. This expressway was numbered as a part of US 112 initially. During the 1950s, additional highways were converted to freeways before the coming of the Interstate Highway System in 1957. The first highway renumbered as an Interstate was US 24A in the southeastern corner of the state, which became part of Interstate 75 (I-75) in 1959.

Major numbering changes started in the 1960s as Michigan retired or rerouted its US Highways with the completion of Interstates. US 12 replaced US 112 in 1962 when the I-94 designation supplanted most of the original US 12. Later that year, US 16 was decommissioned in favor of I-96. This trend continued into the 1970s when US 25 was decommissioned as redundant to sections of I-75 and I-94.

Not all freeway conversions of existing US Highways resulted in the removal of US Highway numbers. In 1968, the state submitted a request for additional Interstate Highway mileage to the federal government, including a proposal to convert US 131. This specific project was not approved although the state continued its own efforts to convert the highway, including various segments opened in the 1970s and 1980s. Other highways converted to freeways included US 10, US 23, US 27, US 31 and US 127.

At the end of the 1970s, MDOT took part in a Federal Highway Administration-backed initiative called the Positive Guidance Demonstration Project, and the two agencies audited signage practices in the vicinity of the I-96/M-37 and I-296/US 131 interchange in Walker, north of Grand Rapids. MDOT determined that usage of the I-296 designation was "a potential source of confusion for motorists". Following this program, the Reflective Systems Unit at MDOT reviewed the state of two- and three-way concurrencies along the highway system in Michigan. They approached the department's Trunkline Numbering Committee and the district traffic and safety engineers on October 19, 1982, for proposals to reduce or eliminate the various overlapping designations to "avoid driver confusion and save funds". The initial discussion report included the various remaining overlaps between Interstate and US Highways. When the unit released its final recommendations on March 17, 1983, various changes were proposed. In 1983, US 2 was truncated, removing the overlap with I-75, and in 1986, US 10 was similarly shortened to remove an overlap with I-75. US 33 was all but eliminated in the state in 1986 as well, eliminating its overlap with US 31. Over a decade later, two highway designations were completely removed from the state in 1990s when US 33 and US 27 were truncated to end in Indiana in 1997 and 1999, respectively. The latter also removed an overlap with I-69.

Additional freeway sections opened around the turn of the 21st century. The St. Johns Bypass along then-US 27 opened on August 31, 1998; and bypasses of Cadillac and Manton on US 131 opened in 2001 and 2003. A 9.5-mile (15.3 km) freeway segment of US 31 north from Berrien Springs to Napier Avenue also opened in 2003. Plans still had support to convert the expressway segment of US 127 between Ithaca and St. Johns into a full freeway as of 2009. MDOT completed a re-evaluation of the environmental studies for the conversion, but future activities were limited to right-of-way acquisition without any commitments for actual construction. Plans are also still in place to complete the rest of the US 31 freeway near Benton Harbor, but funding has not been available.

== Mainline highways ==
Number	Length (mi)	Length (km)	Southern or western terminus	Northern or eastern terminus	Formed	Removed	Notes
US 2	109.177	175.703	US 2 at Ironwood	US 2/US 141 at Mastodon Township south of Crystal Falls	1926	current	Western segment
US 2	195.974	315.390	US 2/US 141 at Breitung Township near Iron Mountain	I-75 and BL I-75 in St. Ignace	1926	current	Eastern segment
US 8	2.322	3.737	US 8 at Norway Township	US 2 in Norway	1926	current	Shortest US Highway in Michigan
US 10	139.656	224.755	Car ferry docks in Ludington	I-75/US 23 and BS I-75/M-25 in Monitor Township near Bay City	1926	current	Connects to US 10 in Wisconsin via the SS Badger car ferry
US 12	210.077	338.086	US 12 at New Buffalo Township	Michigan and Cass avenues in Detroit	1926	current	Michigan Avenue
US 16	210.643	338.997	Car ferry docks in Muskegon	US 10, US 12, US 25 and US 112 in Detroit	1926	1962	Replaced by I-96
US 23	362.152	582.827	US 23/US 223 at Whiteford Township near Temperance	I-75 in Mackinaw City	1926	current	Longest US Highway in Michigan
US 24	79.828	128.471	US 24 at Bedford Township near Erie	I-75 in Springfield Township near Clarkston	1926	current	Telegraph Road
US 25	190.953	307.309	US 25 at Erie Township	M-25 and M-53 in Port Austin	1926	1973	Replaced by M-125, I-75, M-3, I-94, and M-25
US 27	218.195	351.151	I-69/US 27 at Kinderhook Township	I-75 in Beaver Creek Township near Grayling	1926	1999	Replaced by I-69 and US 127; signage removed in 2002
US 31	355.179	571.605	US 31 at Bertrand Township near Niles	I-75 in Mackinaw Township near Mackinaw City	1926	current	
US 33	2.835	4.562	US 33 at Milton Township	US 12 in Milton Township south of Niles	1938	1997	Replaced by M-51; signage removed in 1998
US 41	278.769	448.635	US 41 at Menominee	Cul-de-sac at Fort Wilkins State Park near Copper Harbor	1926	current	
US 45	54.759	88.126	US 45/WIS 32 at Watersmeet Township	Ontonagon and River streets in Ontonagon	c. 1935	current	
US 102	44.094	70.962	US 2 in Crystal Falls	US 41/M-28 in Covington Township	1926	1928	Replaced by US 141
US 112	205.507	330.731	US 12 in New Buffalo Township	US 10, US 12, US 16 and US 25 in Detroit	1926	1962	Replaced by US 12 when I-94 replaced US 12
US 112S	1.709	2.750	US 112S at Mason Township	US 112 in Mason Township near Adamsville	1933	1935	Replaced by M-205, now a county road
US 127	212.168	341.451	US 127 at the Wright–Medina township line near Waldron	I-75 in Beaver Creek Township near Grayling	1926	current	
US 131	269.313	433.417	US 131 at Mottville Township near White Pigeon	US 31 in Petoskey	1926	current	
US 141	8.020	12.907	US 141 at Quinnesec	US 2/US 141 in Breitung Township near Iron Mountain	1928	current	Southern segment
US 141	49.536	79.720	US 2/US 141 at Mastodon Township south of Crystal Falls	US 41/M-28 in Covington Township	1928	current	Northern segment
US 223	45.695	73.539	US 23/US 223 at Whiteford Township near Temperance	US 127 in Woodstock Township near Somerset	1930	current	
Former

Mainline US Highways

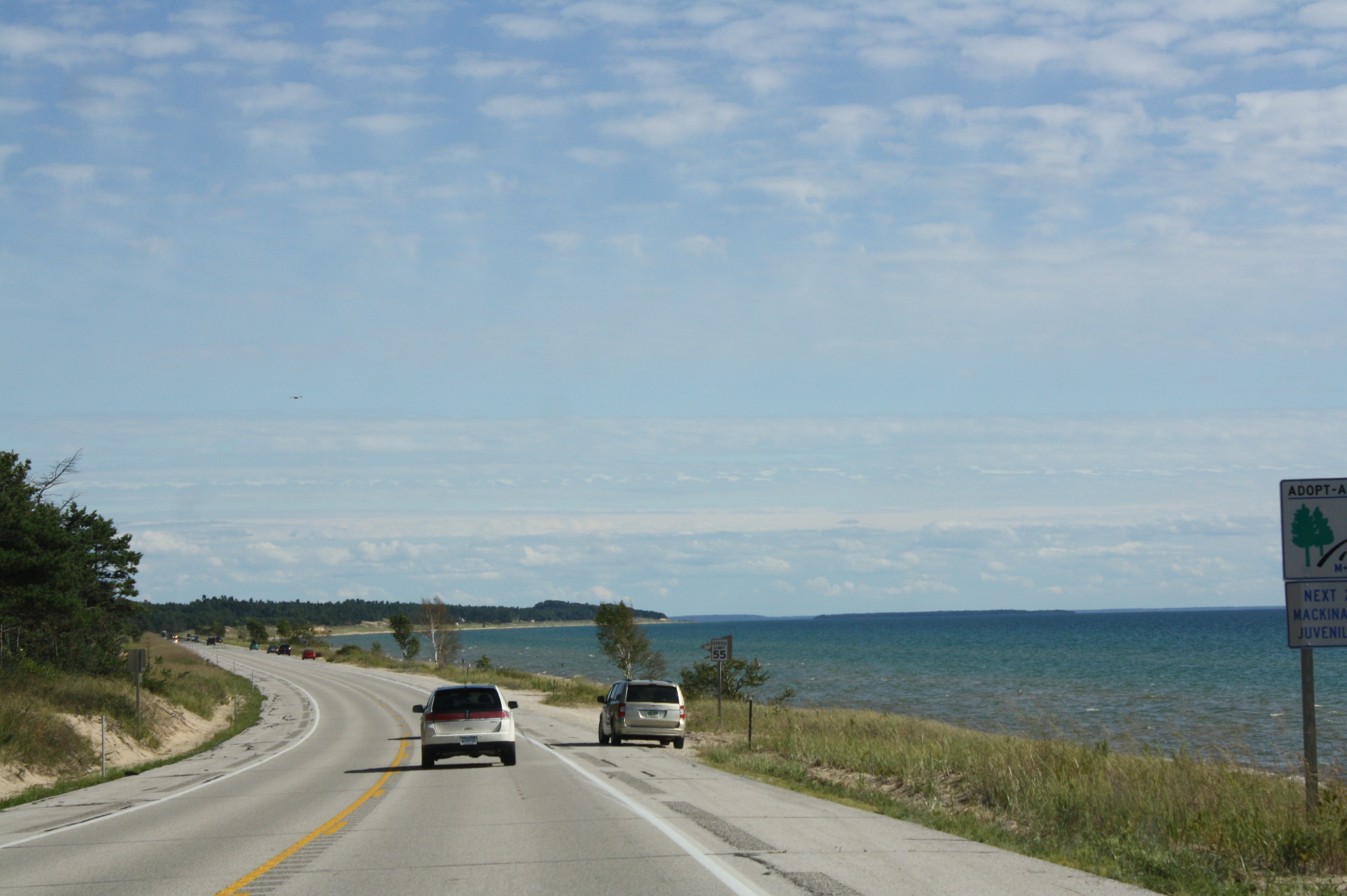
US 2 along Lake Michigan near Brevort

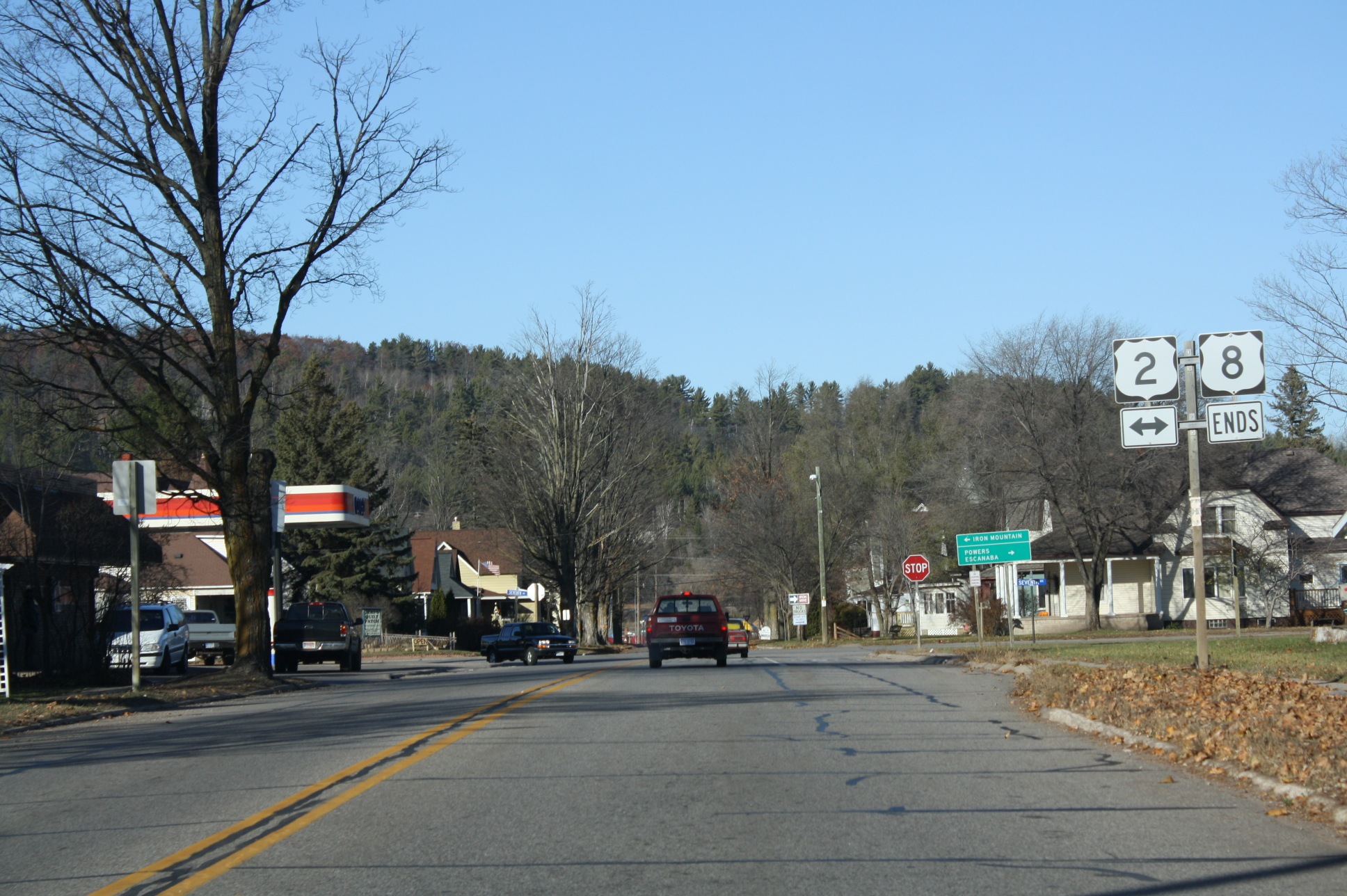
Eastern terminus of US 8 in Norway

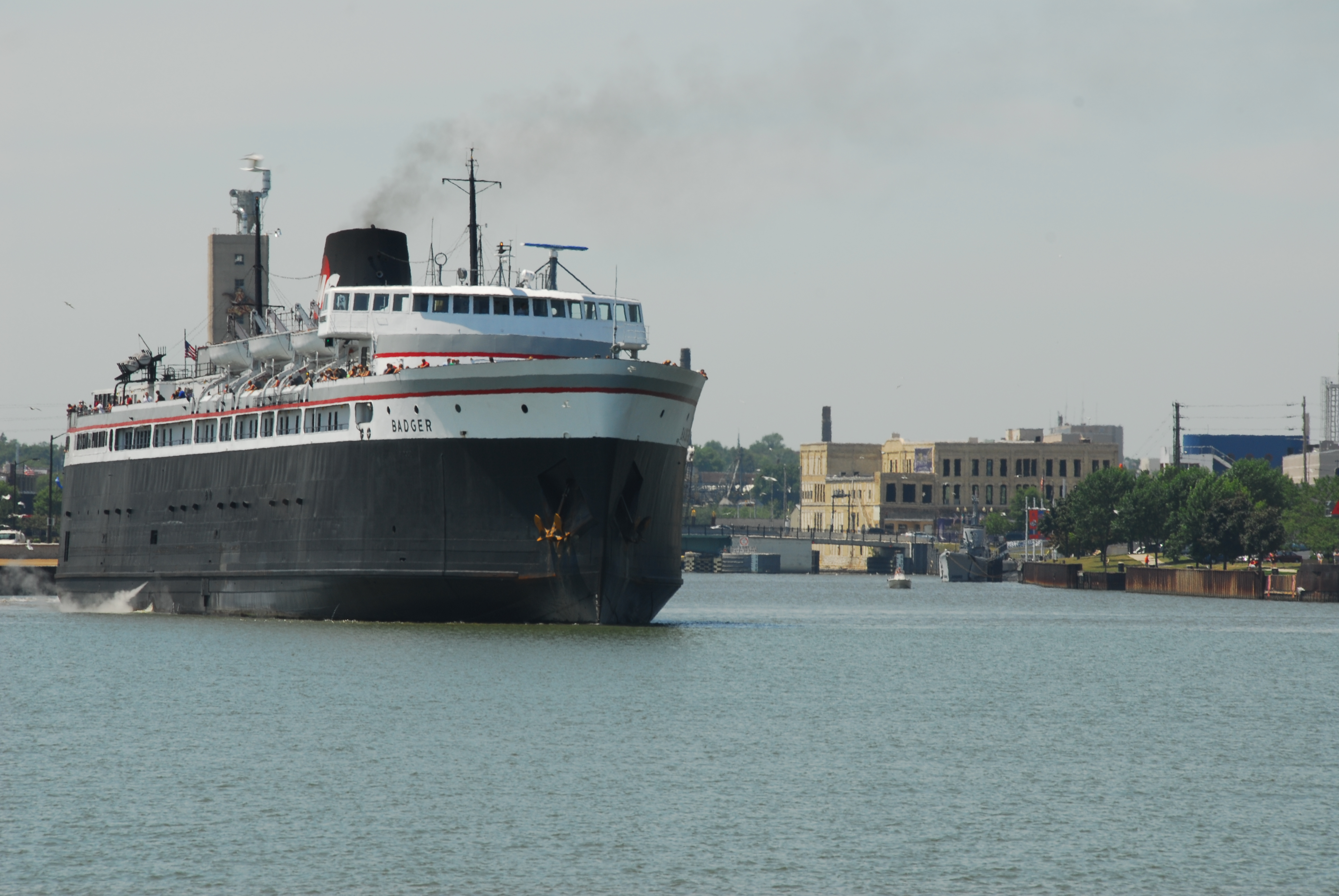
The SS Badger connects US 10 in Ludington to Manitowoc, Wisconsin, across Lake Michigan.

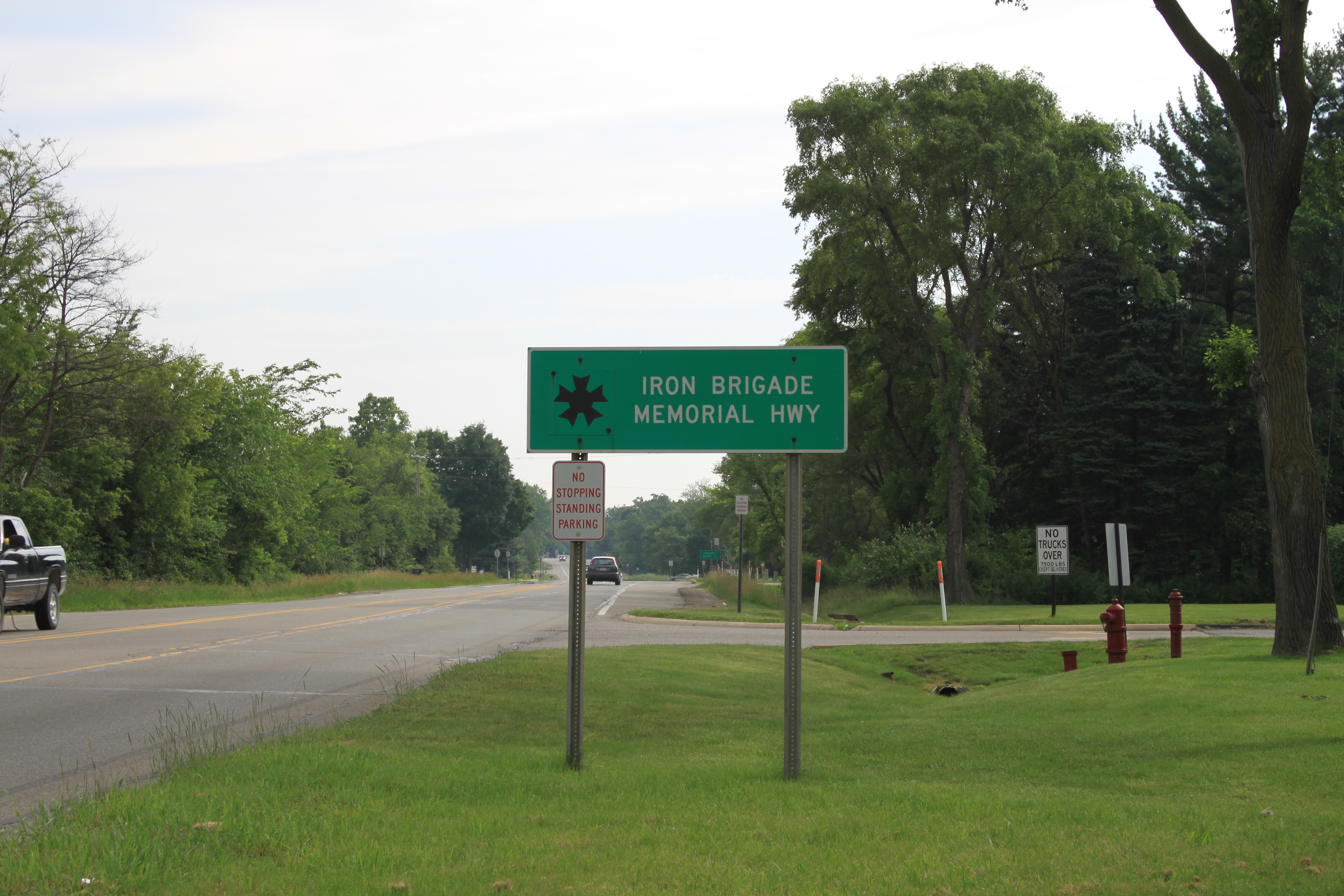
Iron Brigade Memorial Highway sign along US 12 in Pittsfield Township

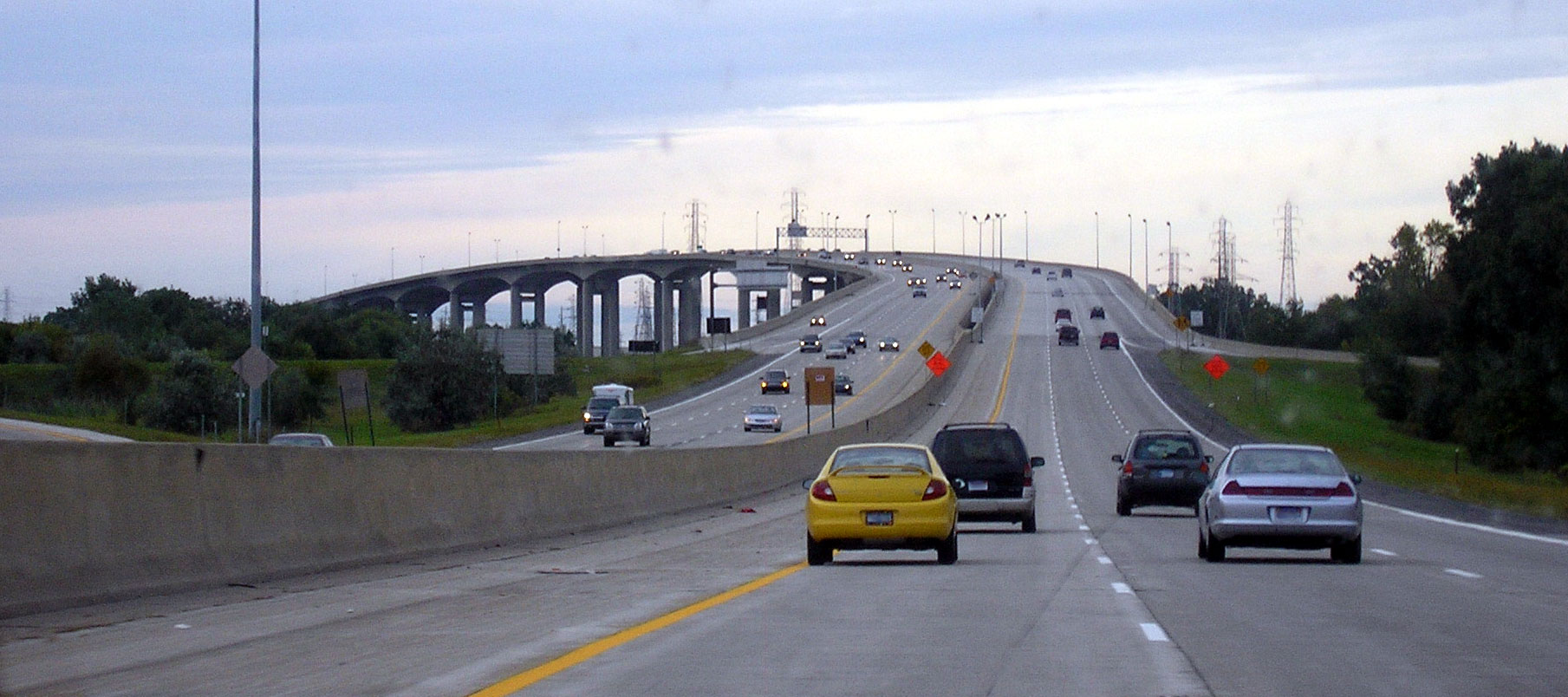
I-75/US 23 approaching the Zilwaukee Bridge

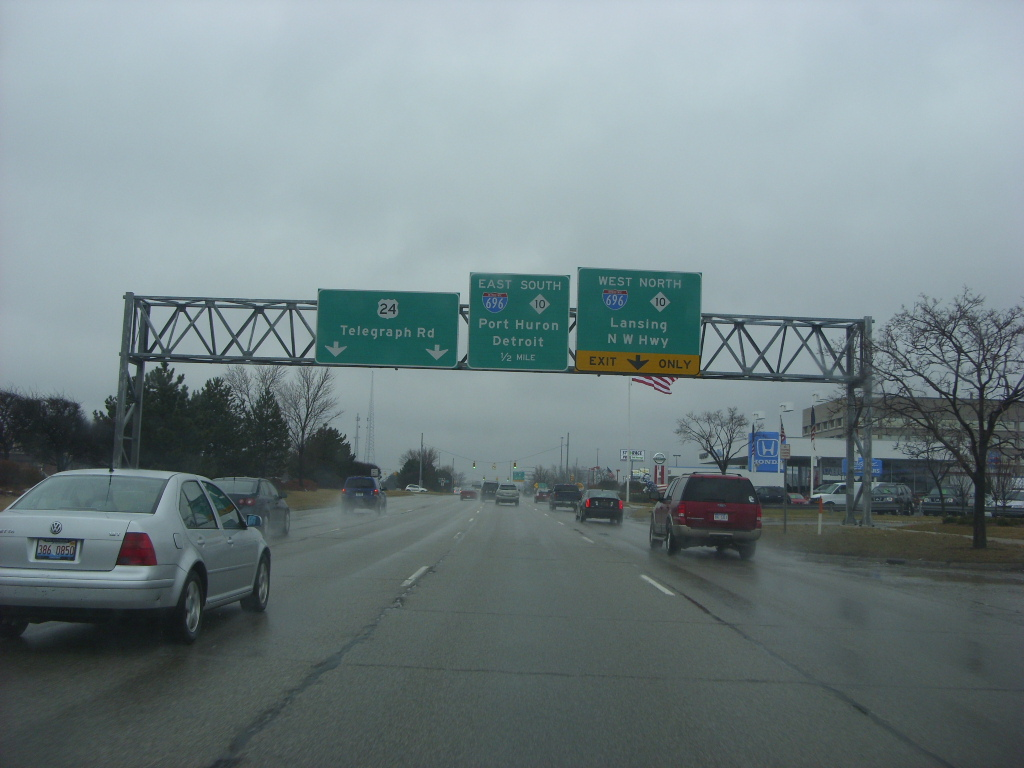
US 24 (Telegraph Road) approaching the Mixing Bowl interchange in Southfield

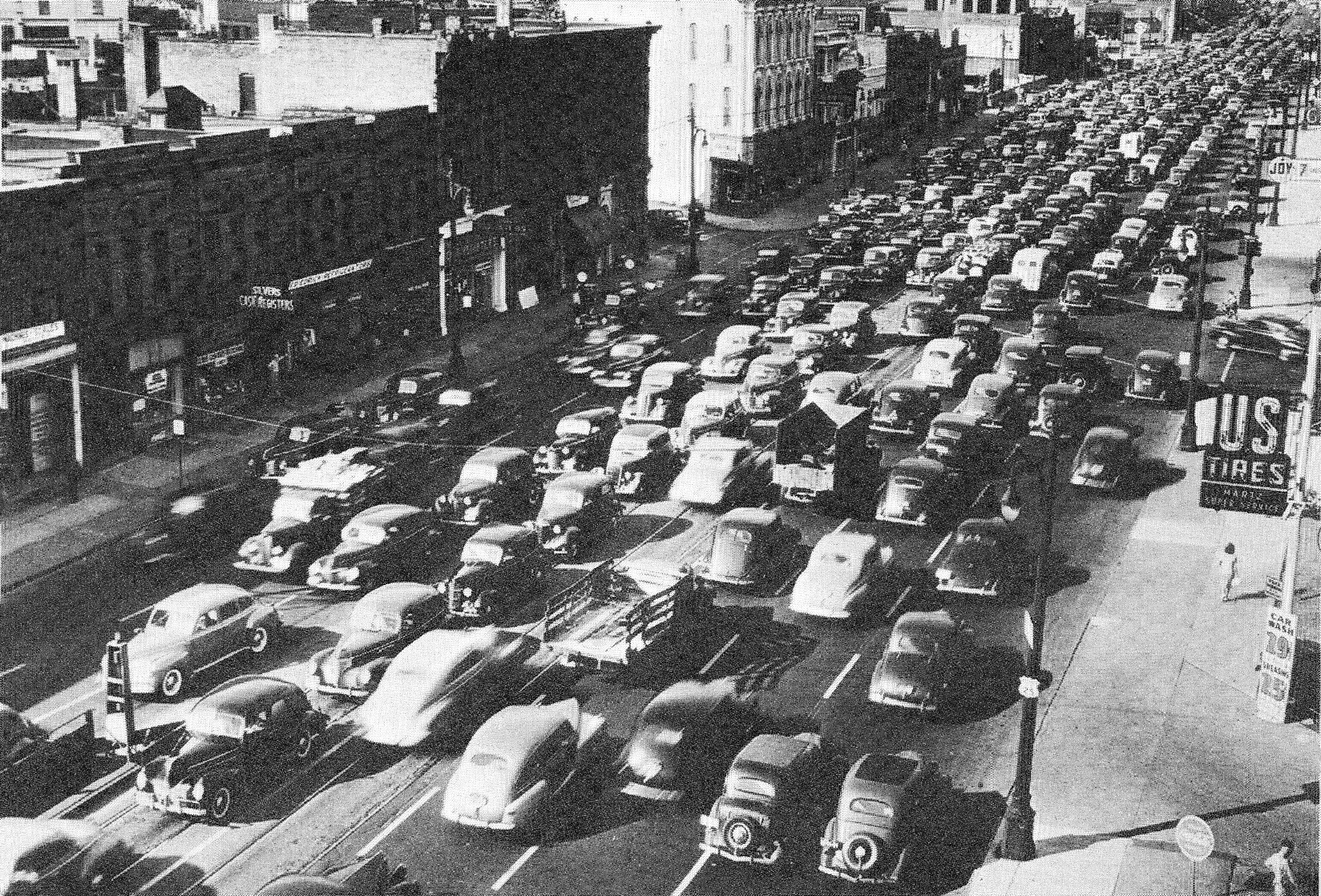
US 25 (Gratiot Avenue) in Detroit in 1941

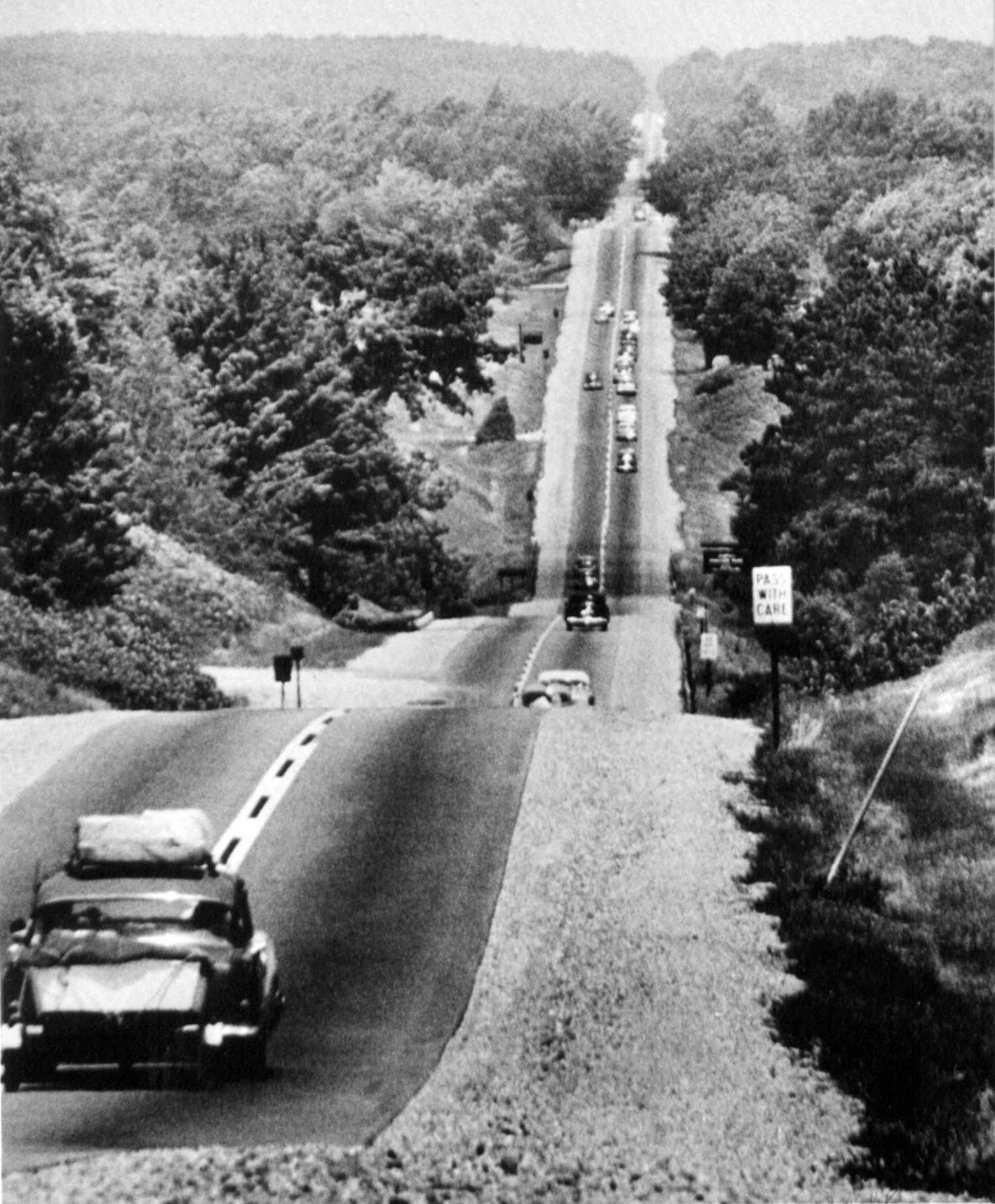
US 27 near Clare before conversion to a freeway

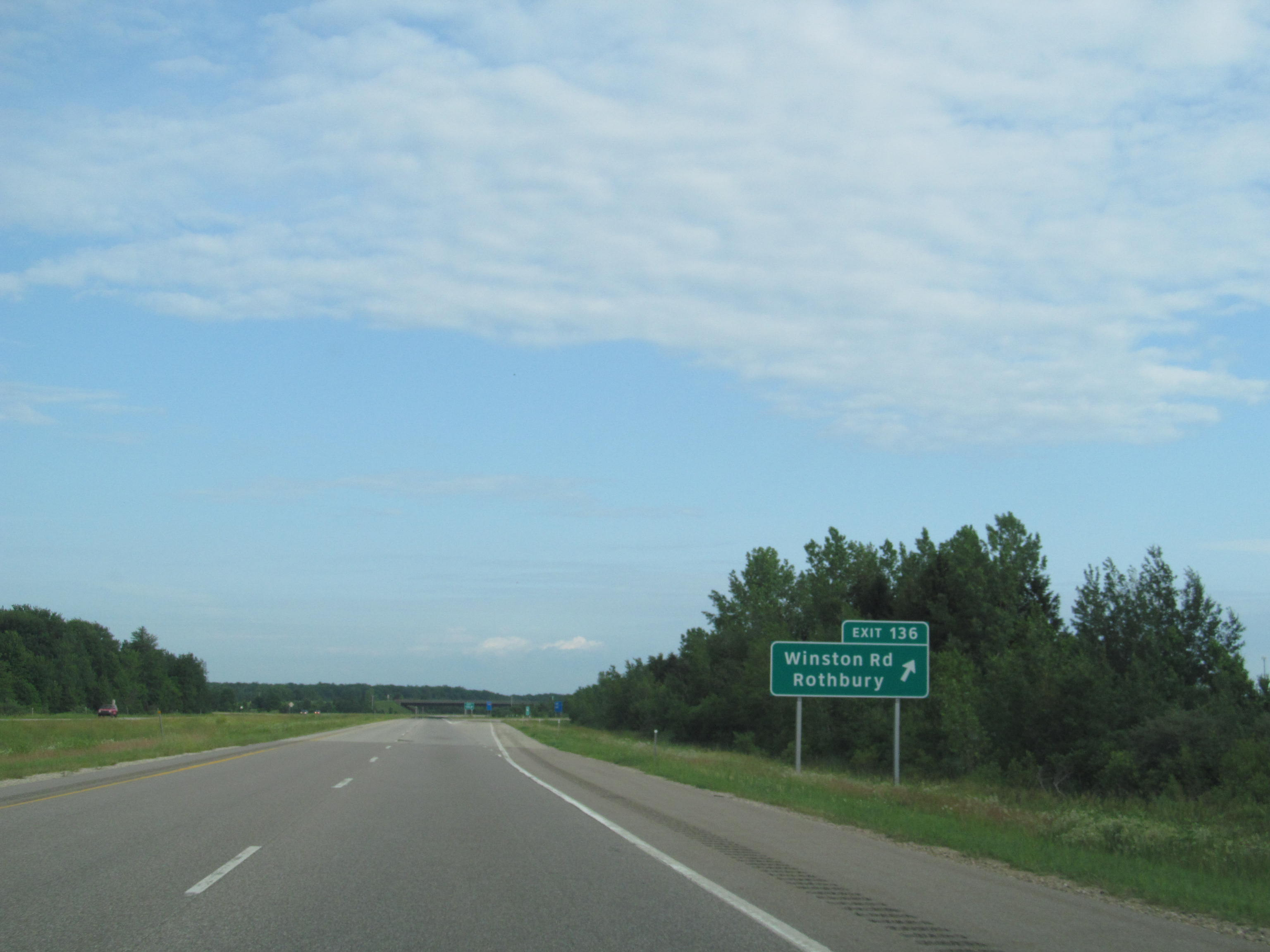
US 31 freeway near Rothbury

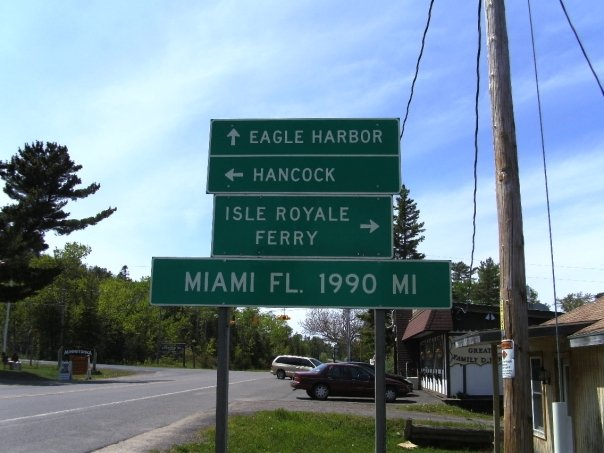
US 41 mileage sign in Copper Harbor showing the mileage to Miami, Florida

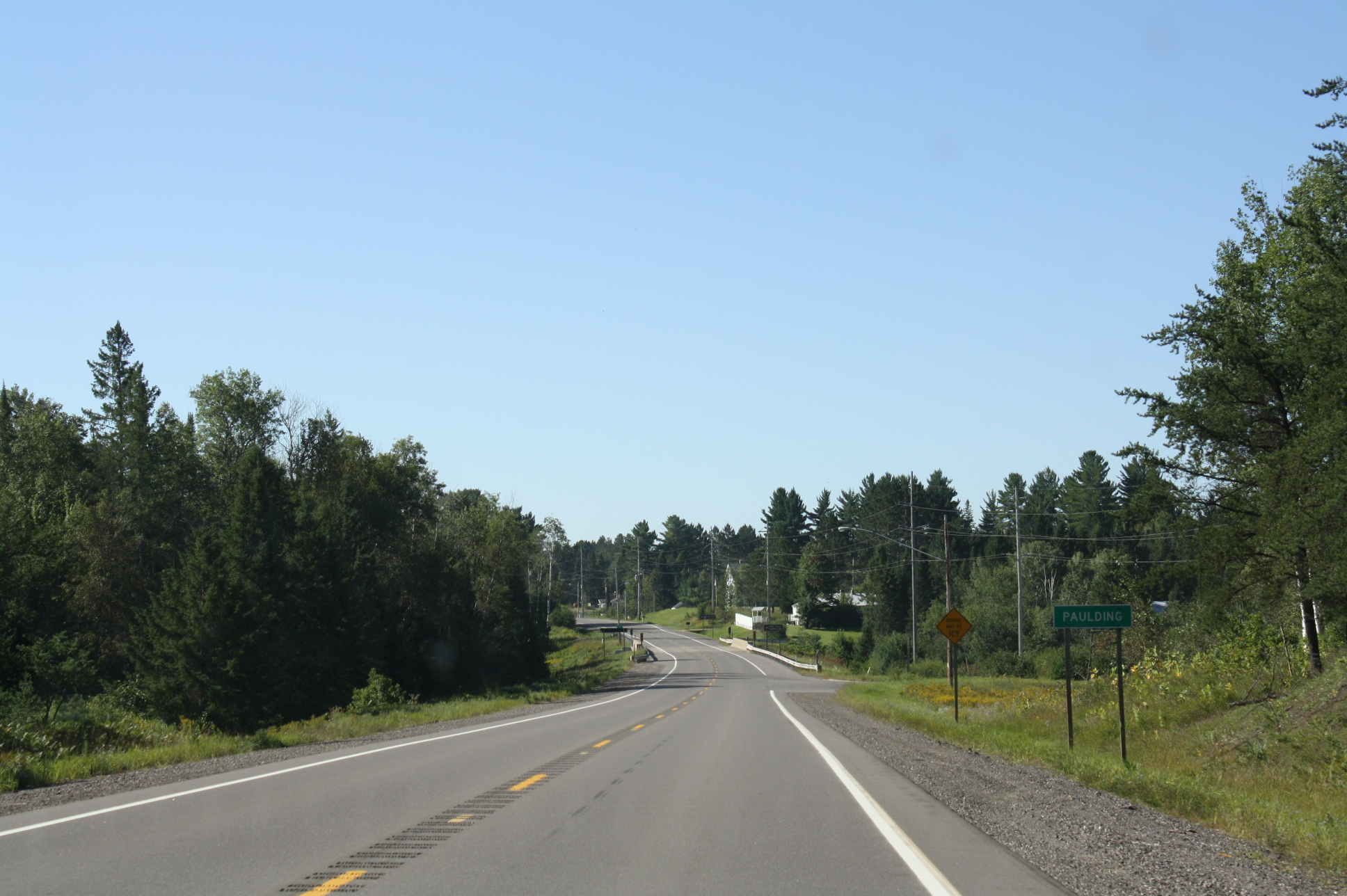
US 45 entering Paulding

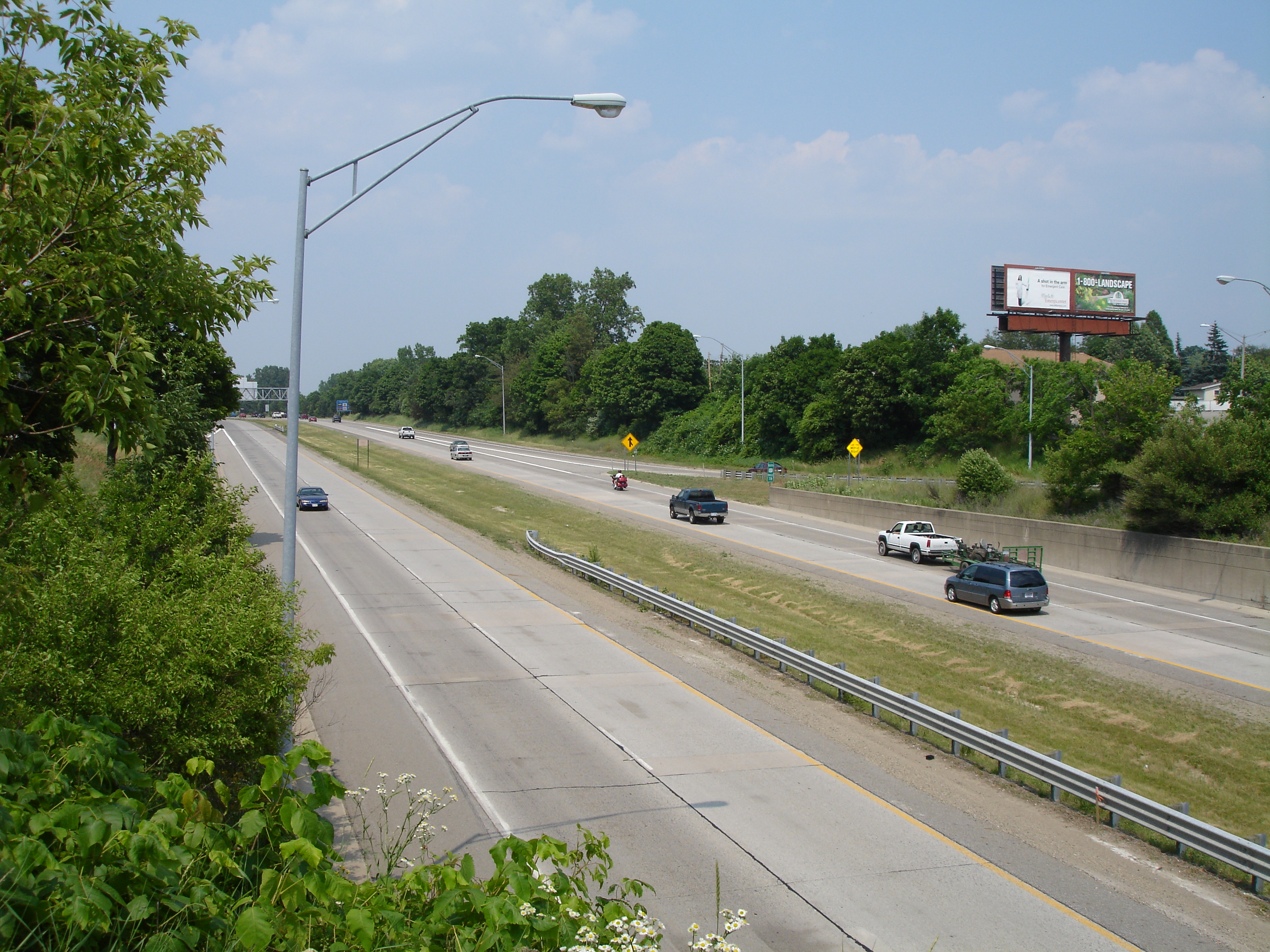
US 127 through East Lansing

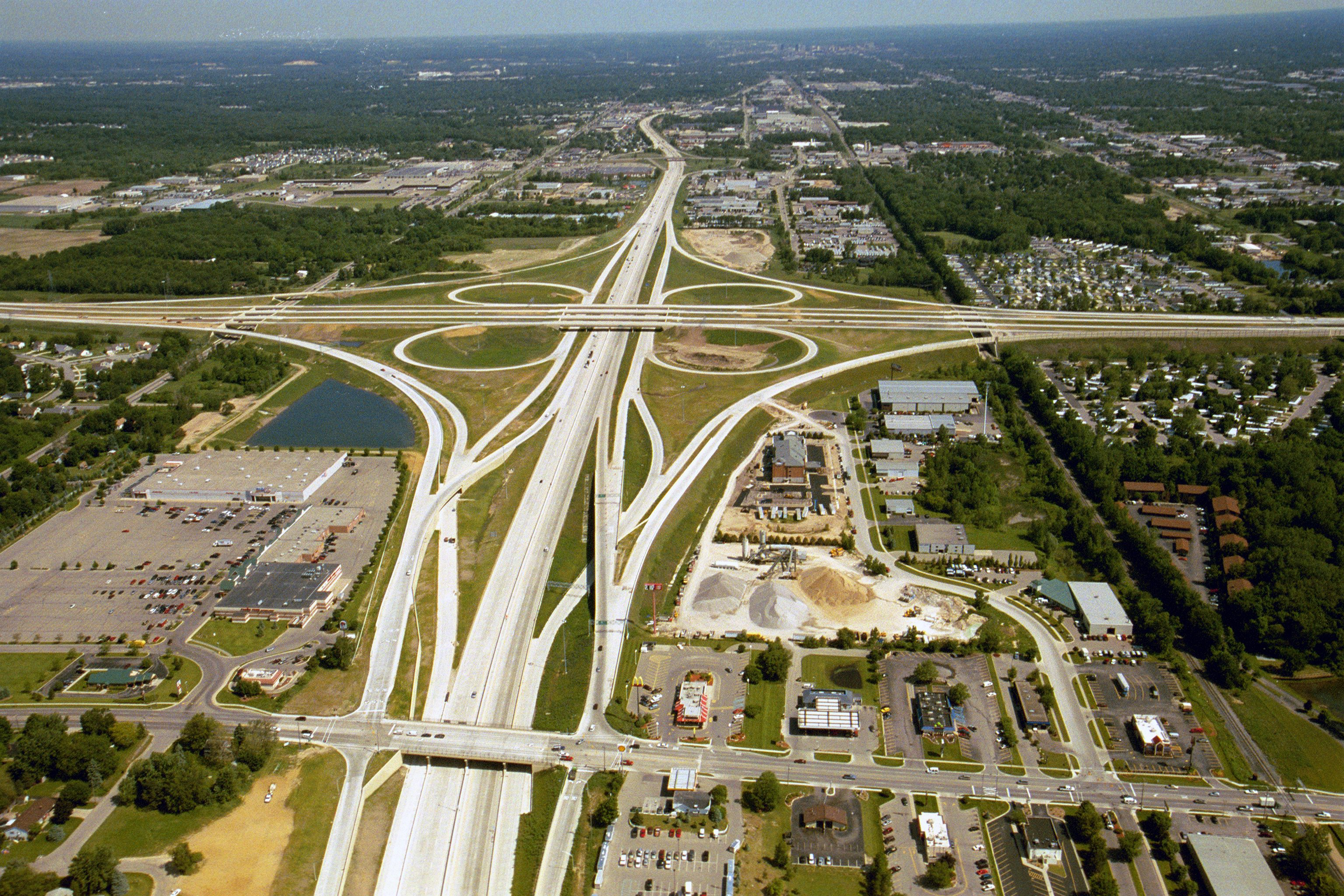
Cloverleaf interchange between US 131 and M-6 near Wyoming

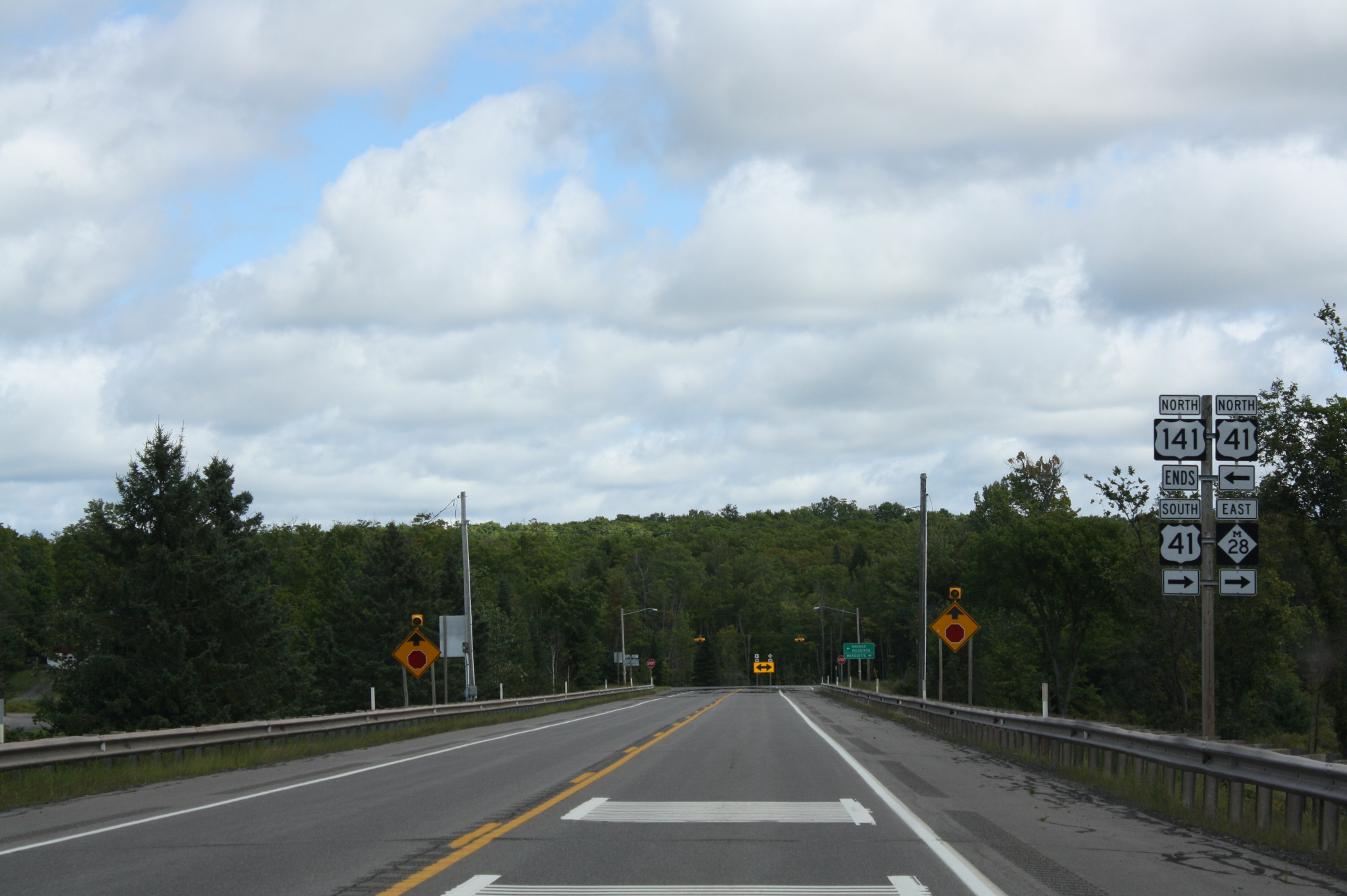
Northern terminus of US 141 near Covington

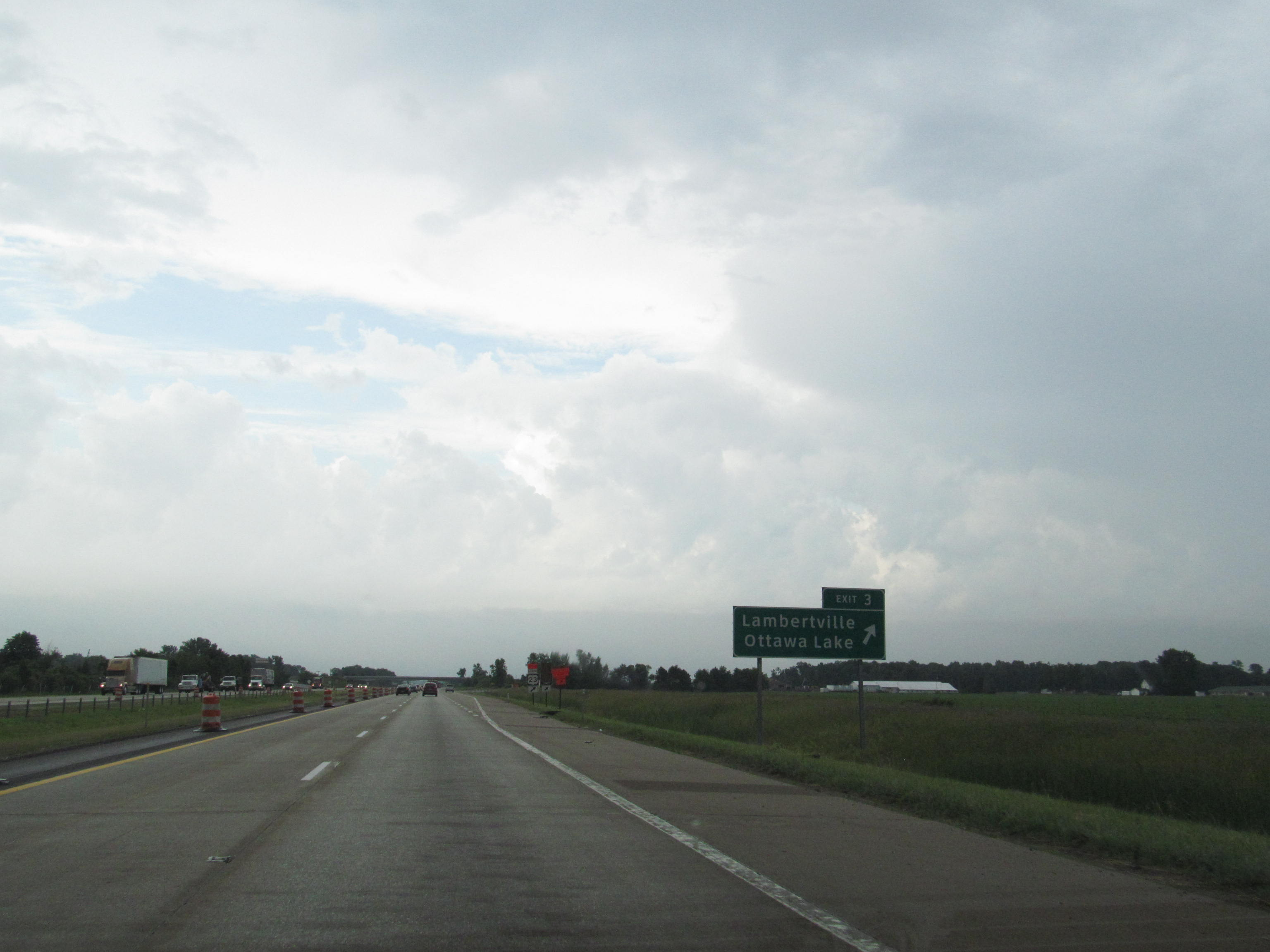
US 23/US 223 in Monroe County

== Special routes ==
Number	Length (mi)	Length (km)	Southern or western terminus	Northern or eastern terminus	Formed	Removed	Notes
Bus. US 2	1.270	2.044	Wisconsin state line at Ironwood	US 2 in Ironwood	1942	current	Business spur; previously included a connection across the state line into Hurley, Wisconsin
Bus. US 10	2.095	3.372	US 10 in Reed City	US 10 in Reed City	c. 1960	current	
Bus. US 10	5.002	8.050	US 127/US 10 on the Grant–Sheridan township line	US 10 in Wise Township	1975	current	Serves Clare
Bus. US 10	7.200	11.587	US 10 in Midland	US 10 and M-20 in Midland	1960	current	Western end is in Midland County and eastern end is in Bay County
Bus. US 10	14.767	23.765	US 10 in Mount Morris Township	US 10 in Grand Blanc Township	1941	1962	Served Flint; replaced by Bus. M-54, also since returned to local control
Bus. US 10	6.925	11.145	US 10 in Waterford Township	US 10 in Bloomfield Township	1961	1986	Served Pontiac; replaced by Bus. US 24
US 12A	3.767	6.062	US 12 in Kalamazoo	US 12 in Comstock	1931	1954	Replaced by M-96
Bus. US 12	11.955	19.240	I-94/US 12 in Texas Township	I-94/US 12 in Comstock Township	1959	1961	Served Kalamazoo; replaced by BL I-94
Bus. US 12	9.678	15.575	I-94/US 12 in Battle Creek Township	I-94/US 12 in Emmett Township	1940	1961	Served Battle Creek; replaced by BL I-94
Bus. US 12	3.716	5.980	I-94/US 12 in Marshall Township	I-94/US 12 in Marengo Township	1960	1961	Served Marshall; replaced by BL I-94
Bus. US 12	4.520	7.274	I-94/US 12 in Albion	I-94/US 14 in Parma Township	1960	1961	Replaced by BL I-94
Bus. US 12	10.274	16.534	I-94/US 12 in Blackman Township	I-94/US 12 in Leoni Township	c. 1951	1960	Served Jackson; replaced by BL I-94
Bus. US 12	5.327	8.573	US 12 in Bertrand Township	US 12 and M-51 in Niles Township	1962	2010	Served Niles; replaced by M-51, M-139
Bus. US 12	8.020	12.907	I-94/US 12 in Ypsilanti	US 12 in Van Buren Township	1962	current	Replaced Bus. US 112
Byp. US 16	20.197	32.504	US 16 in Walker Township	US 16 in Cascade Township	1942	1953	Bypassed Grand Rapids; replaced by the US 16 mainline, now part of M-11
Bus. US 16	17.102	27.523	US 16 in Walker	US 16 in Cascade Township	1953	1962	Served Grand Rapids; returned to local control
US 16A	3.863	6.217	US 16 in Farmington Hills	US 16 in Farmington Hills	1933	1956	Bypassed Farmington; replaced by the US 16 mainline, now part of M-5
Bus. US 16	4.129	6.645	US 16 in Farmington Hills	US 16 in Farmington Hills	1956	1961	Served Farmington; replaced by BL I-96, now unsigned
Bus. US 23	5.781	9.304	BL I-94/US 23 and M-17 in Pittsfield Township	US 23/M-14 in Ann Arbor Township	1962	current	Serves Ann Arbor
Bus. US 23	3.009	4.843	US 23 in Fenton	US 23 in Fenton	c. 1958	2006	Southern 1.723 mi (2.773 km) unsigned after 1975; now under city control
Bus. US 23	8.006	12.884	US 10/US 23 in Bridgeport Township	US 23/M-81 in Saginaw	1953	1961	Replaced by BL I-75
Bus. US 23	2.714	4.368	US 23 in Bay City	US 23/M-47 and M-20 in Bay City	1941	1961	Replaced by BL I-75/M-25 and M-84
Bus. US 23	4.074	6.556	US 23 in Belknap Township	US 23 in Rogers City	1942	current	
US 24A	33.783	54.368	Ohio state line south of Erie	US 25 in Taylor	1945	1959	Replaced by I-75
Bus. US 24	7.121	11.460	US 24 in Bloomfield Township	US 24 in Waterford Township	1986	current	Serves Pontiac; formerly Bus. US 10
US 25A	5.111	8.225	Ohio state line in Erie Township	US 25 in Erie Township	1937	1945	Replaced by US 24A and later I-75
US 25A	2.481	3.993	M-51 in Fort Gratiot Township	US 25 in Fort Gratiot Township	1940	1963	Replaced by US 25 and later M-25
Bus. US 25	8.382	13.490	I-94/US 25 in Kimball Township	US 25 in Fort Gratiot Township	1963	1973	Served Marysville and Port Huron; replaced by M-25 and later BL I-94
Bus. US 27	2.986	4.806	I-69/US 27 and BL I-94 in Marshall Township	I-94 in Marshall Township	1967	1972	Served Marshall; sections not concurrent with BL I-94 turned over to local control
Bus. US 27	4.891	7.871	I-69/US 27 on the Carmel–Eaton township line	I-69/US 27 in Charlotte	1961	1974	Replaced by BL I-69
Truck US 27	1.529	2.461	US 27/M-78 in Lansing	US 27/M-78 in Lansing	1936	1950	Replaced by US 27
Bus. US 27	4.725	7.604	BL I-96 in Lansing	I-69/US 27 in DeWitt Township	1984	2002	Replaced by unsigned Bus. US 127 in Lansing
Bus. US 27	8.808	14.175	US 27 in Olive Township	US 27 in Bingham Township	1998	2002	Served St. Johns; replaced by Bus. US 127
Bus. US 27	3.745	6.027	US 27 on the Ithaca–North Star Township line	US 27 in Emerson Township	1961	2002	Replaced by Bus. US 127
US 27A	5.255	8.457	US 27 east of Alma	US 27 and M-46 west of St. Louis	1929	1961	Replaced by Bus. US 27
Bus. US 27	5.631	9.062	US 27 on the Emerson–Bethany township line	US 27 in Pine River Township	1961	2002	Served Alma; replaced US 27A and replaced by Bus. US 127
Bus. US 27	4.711	7.582	US 27 on the Pine River–Bethany township line	US 27 in Pine River Township	1961	2002	Served St. Louis; replaced by Bus. US 127
Bus. US 27	5.688	9.154	US 127 in Union Township	US 127 in Union Township	1961	2002	Served Mt. Pleasant; replaced by Bus. US 127
Bus. US 27	3.374	5.430	US 127 in Vernon Township	US 127/US 10 in Grant Township	1961	2002	Served Clare; replaced by Bus. US 127
Bus. US 27	6.903	11.109	US 127 and M-61 in Hayes Township	US 127 in Hayes Township	1961	2002	Served Harrison; replaced by Bus. US 127
Bus. US 31	3.587	5.773	Bus. US 12 in Niles	Old US 31 in Niles Township	1987	2010	Replaced by M-139
Bus. US 31	3.992	6.425	US 31 in South Haven Township	US 31 in Casco Township	c. 1942	1963	Served South Haven; replaced by BL I-196
Bus. US 31	4.120	6.630	BL I-196/US 31 in Holland	US 31 and BL I-196 in Holland Township	1954	2004	Returned to city control
US 31A	4.763	7.665	US 16 and US 31 in Muskegon Heights	US 31 in Muskegon	1932	c. 1941	Replaced by Bus. US 31
Bus. US 31	9.870	15.884	I-96 and US 31 in Norton Shores	US 31 in North Muskegon	c. 1941	current	Serves Muskegon; replaced US 31A
Bus. US 31	4.680	7.532	US 31 in Whitehall Township	US 31 in Montague Township	1964	current	Serves Whitehall and Montague
Bus. US 31	2.138	3.441	US 31 in Hart Township	Johnson and State streets in Hart	1987	2025	Returned to county and city control
Bus. US 31	7.151	11.508	US 31 in Weare Township	US 31 on the Pentwater–Weare township line	1955	2023	Served Pentwater
Bus. US 31	3.172	5.105	US 31 in Pere Marquette Township	US 10 in Ludington	2005	current	Business spur
Bus. US 41	2.343	3.771	US 41/M-28 in Marquette	US 41/M-28 in Marquette	1963	2005	Returned to city control
Bus. US 41	4.873	7.842	US 41/M-28 in Ishpeming	US 41/M-28 in Negaunee	1937	1958	Replaced by Bus. M-28
Bus. US 41	4.256	6.849	US 41 in Baraga	US 41 in Baraga Township	1940	1942	Returned to local control
Bus. US 112	5.434	8.745	US 112 in Bertrand Township	US 112 and M-60 in Milton Township	c. 1956	1962	Served Niles; replaced by Bus. US 12
Byp. US 112	8.023	12.912	US 112 and M-17 in Pittsfield Township	US 112 in Van Buren Township	c. 1942	1956	Bypassed Ypsilanti; replaced by I-94
Bus. US 112	8.020	12.907	US 112 in Ypsilanti	US 112 in Van Buren Township	1956	1962	Replaced by Bus. US 12
Bus. US 127	6.443	10.369	US 127 and M-50 in Summit Township	I-94, US 127 and M-50 in Blackman Township	c. 1959	current	Seves Jackson
Bus. US 127	2.369	3.813	US 127 in Mason	US 127 and M-36 in Mason	c. 1946	1964	Sections not concurrent with M-36 turned over to local control
Bus. US 127	4.725	7.604	BL I-96 in Lansing	I-69 in DeWitt Township	2002	current	Unsigned; replaced Bus. US 27
Bus. US 127	8.808	14.175	US 127 in Olive Township	US 127 in Bingham Township	2002	current	Serves St. Johns; replaced Bus. US 27
Bus. US 127	3.745	6.027	US 127 on the Ithaca–North Star Township line	US 127 in Emerson Township	2002	current	Replaced Bus. US 27
Bus. US 127	5.631	9.062	US 127 on the Emerson–Bethany township line	US 127 in Pine River Township	2002	current	Serves Alma; replaced Bus. US 27
Bus. US 127	4.711	7.582	US 127 on the Pine River–Bethany township line	US 127 in Pine River Township	2002	current	Serves St. Louis; replaced Bus. US 27
Bus. US 127	5.688	9.154	US 127 in Union Township	US 127 in Union Township	2002	current	Serves Mt. Pleasant; replaced Bus. US 27
Bus. US 127	3.374	5.430	US 127 in Vernon Township	US 127/US 10 in Grant Township	2002	current	Serves Clare; replaced Bus. US 27
Bus. US 127	6.903	11.109	US 127 and M-61 in Hayes Township	US 127 in Hayes Township	2002	current	Serves Harrison; replaced Bus. US 27
Bus. US 131	3.656	5.884	US 131 in Constantine Township	US 131 in Constantine Township	2013	current	Serves Constantine
Bus. US 131	2.982	4.799	US 131/M-60 in Three Rivers	US 131 in Three Rivers	1953	current	
Bus. US 131	4.198	6.756	Westnedge Avenue and Park Street in Kalamazoo Township	US 131 in Kalamazoo Township	1964	current	Serves Kalamazoo
Byp. US 131	14.253	22.938	US 131 in Grand Rapids	US 131 in Plainfield Township	1945	1953	Replaced by M-11, M-37 and M-44
Bus. US 131	2.419	3.893	US 131 in Grand Rapids	I-296/US 131 in Grand Rapids	1953	2017	Returned to local control
Bus. US 131	6.860	11.040	US 131/M-20 in Big Rapids Township	US 131 and B-96 in Big Rapids Township	1983	current	Serves Big Rapids
Bus. US 131	5.597	9.007	US 131/M-55 in Clam Lake Township	US 131 in Haring Township	2001	current	Serves Cadillac
Bus. US 131	5.667	9.120	US 131 and M-42 in Cedar Creek Township	US 131 in Liberty Township	2003	current	Serves Manton
Bus. US 223	3.751	6.037	US 223 and M-52 in Adrian	US 223 in Adrian	c. 1956	current	
Former
