= U.S. Route 33 in Michigan =

Former U.S. Highway in Michigan

US Highway 33
- US 33 highlighted in bright red; greatest extent in gray

Route information
- Maintained by MDOT
- Length: 2.835 mi (4.562 km)
- Existed: January 1, 1938–April 25, 1997
- History: Last signage removed in April 1998

Major junctions
- South end: US 33 near Niles
- North end: US 12 near Niles

Location
- Country: United States
- State: Michigan
- Counties: Berrien

Highway system
- United States Numbered Highway System; List; Special; Divided; Michigan State Trunkline Highway System; Interstate; US; State; Byways
← M-32	→ M-33

US Highway 33 (US 33) is a part of the United States Numbered Highway System that was once located in Berrien County, Michigan. At the time it was removed from the state, it was only about 2.8 miles (4.5 km) long running north from the Indiana state line to an intersection with US 12 south of Niles. The highway was not originally part of the US Highway System in the state; it was added in 1938 as a second designation for part of US 31 between the state line and St. Joseph. It was later extended further north to the community of Lake Michigan Beach. This extension became the only section of US 33 that was routed independent of another highway until it was truncated to Niles. In 1997, US 33 was officially removed from the state.

== Route description ==
At the time it last existed in Michigan, US 33 started at the Indiana state line at an intersection with State Line Road. From there it ran due north along 11th Street through a residential neighborhood parallel to the St. Joseph River. Just past an intersection with Fulkerson Road, the highway curved briefly to the northeast as it approached Bell Road. US 33 terminated at a five-ramp partial cloverleaf interchange with US 12 (Pulaski Highway) south of the city of Niles in Bertrand Township. According to the Michigan Department of Transportation (MDOT), the agency that maintained the roadway, in 1998, the last year it was US 33, the highway carried between 17,192 and 24,669 vehicles on average, daily. Additionally, the roadway that carried the highway designation is listed on the National Highway System, a network of roads important to the country's economy, defense, and mobility.

== History ==
The State Trunkline Highway System was created on May 13, 1913, by an act of the Michigan Legislature; at the time, one of the system's divisions corresponded to US 33. Division 5 followed a course from Niles northward to Mackinaw City. In 1919, the Michigan State Highway Department (MSHD) (Note: The Michigan State Highway Department was reorganized into the Michigan Department of State Highways and Transportation on August 23, 1973. The name was shortened to its current form in 1978.) signposted the highway system for the first time, and the future US 33 corridor was assigned the original M-58 designation from the state line northward through Niles to St. Joseph. When the United States Numbered Highway System was created on November 11, 1926, the corridor received the US 31 designation. The US 33 designation was later added to US 31 from the state line northward to St. Joseph on January 1, 1938, ending at the intersection with US 12/US 31 at Main Street and Niles Avenue. It was dedicated as part of the Blue and Gray Trail on May 2 of that year.

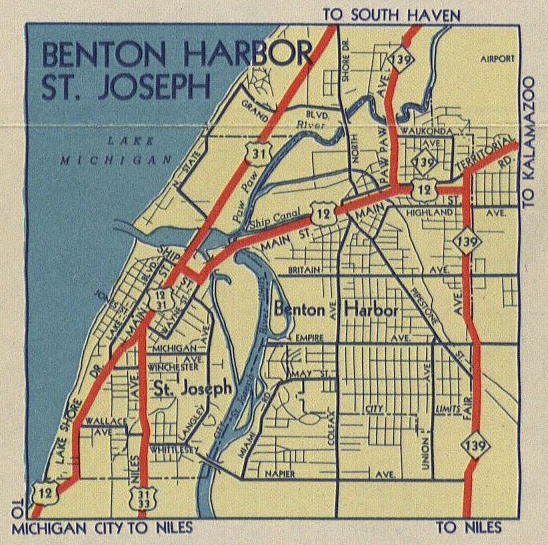
Pre-1960 terminus of US 33 in St. Joseph

In November 1960, the US 33 designation was extended northward along US 31 from St. Joseph through Benton Harbor to Hagar Shore Road in Lake Michigan Beach. Three years later, a segment of the Interstate 96 (I-96, later I-196) freeway opened northeast of Benton Harbor, and US 31 was rerouted to follow it, leaving US 33 to its own alignment between Scottdale and Lake Michigan Beach, now following 1/2 mile (0.80 km) of Hagar Shore Road east to its I-96/US 31 interchange. This was the first time that US 33 had a section of its routing in Michigan that was not concurrent with another highway. Additional freeway for US 31 was built in the late 1970s into the 1980s. Called the St. Joseph Valley Parkway, the first section of this freeway through Berrien County was completed in 1979 and ran from the Indiana state line north to US 12; after its completion, US 33 had a second independent routing from the state line north to downtown Niles.

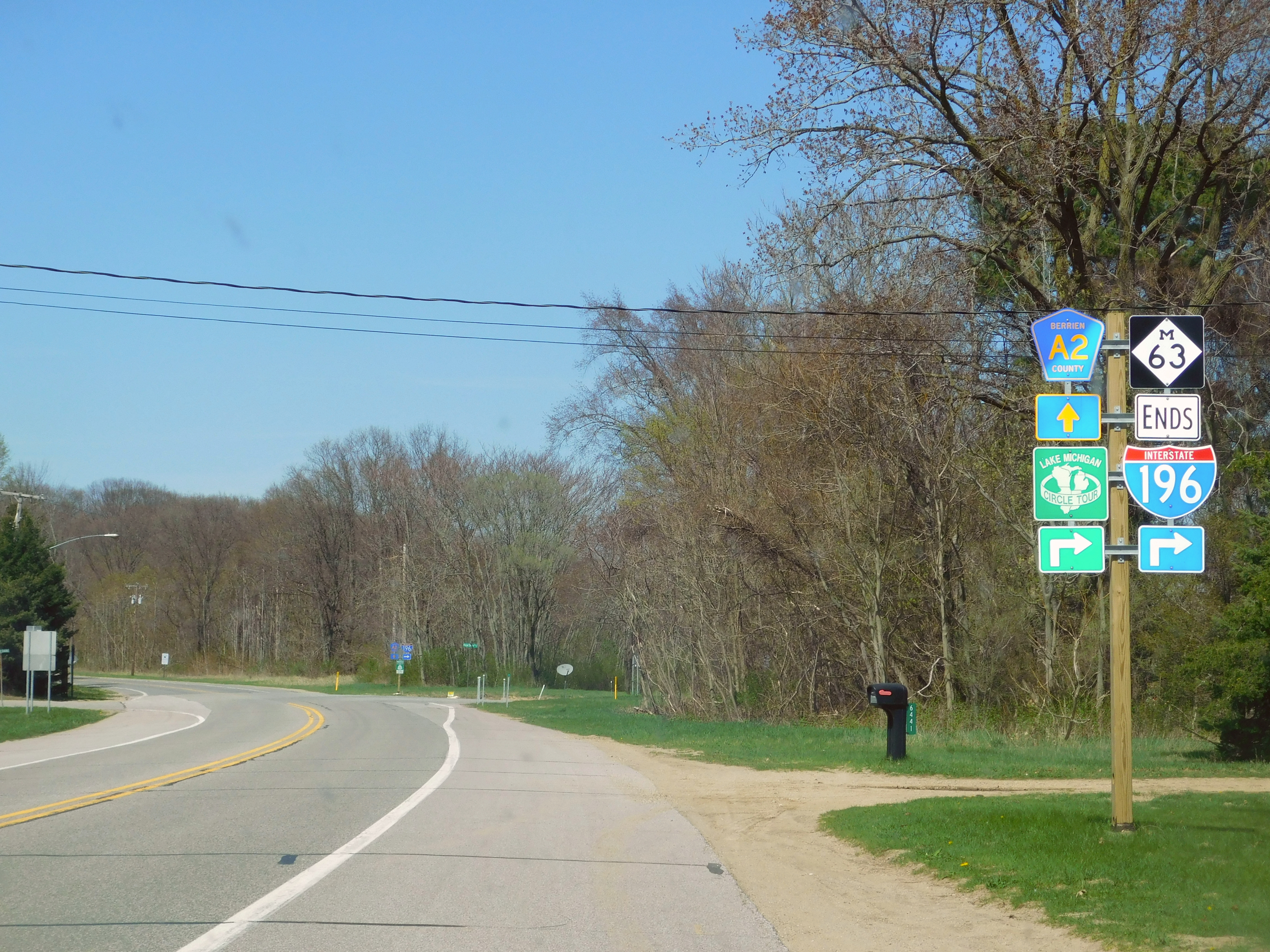
Northern terminus of M-63 in 2016, the one-time terminus of US 33

US 33 was all but eliminated in Michigan on June 9, 1986, when the American Association of State Highway and Transportation Officials (AASHTO) approved a request by MDOT to truncate the designation to the intersection with US 12 south of Niles. Signage was updated in September 1986, renumbering the northern section to M-63 and the section between downtown Niles and US 12 as a rerouted Bus. US 12. The last segment of US 33 between US 12 and the state line was removed on April 25, 1997, when AASHTO approved a joint request by MDOT and its counterpart in Indiana to truncate the highway designation to an intersection with US 20 in Elkhart, Indiana. This remaining segment in Michigan became part of an extended M-51 when the signage was changed a year later.

On March 5, 2010, a segment of Bus. US 12 previously used by US 33 in downtown Niles was transferred back to city control. Otherwise, except for a slight reroute at Scottdale in 1985, all of US 33 at its greatest extent from 1963 through 1986 remains part of a state highway in Michigan. From the state line into Niles, it is M-51; from the west side of downtown Niles, it is M-139 to Scottdale; and from there north, it is M-63.

== Major intersections ==
The entire highway was in Bertrand Township, Berrien County.

mi	km	Destinations	Notes
0.000	0.000	US 33 south – South Bend	Continuation into Indiana; now State Road 933
2.835	4.562	US 12 – New Buffalo, Sturgis, Three Rivers M-51 north – Niles	Roadway continued north as M-51
1.000 mi = 1.609 km; 1.000 km = 0.621 mi

== Notes ==
U.S. Route 33
Previous state: Indiana	Michigan	Next state: Terminus
