= M-51 (Michigan highway) =

State highway in Michigan, United States

M-51
- M-51 highlighted in red

Route information
- Maintained by MDOT
- Length: 40.405 mi (65.026 km)
- Existed: 1971–present

Major junctions
- South end: SR 933 near South Bend, IN
- US 12 near Niles; M-62 in Dowagiac; M-152 near Dowagiac
- North end: I-94 near Paw Paw

Location
- Country: United States
- State: Michigan
- Counties: Berrien, Cass, Van Buren

Highway system
- Michigan State Trunkline Highway System; Interstate; US; State; Byways
← M-50	→ M-52

M-51 is a north–south state trunkline highway in the southwestern portion of the US state of Michigan. The southern terminus is at a connection with State Road 933 across the Michigan–Indiana state line near South Bend, Indiana. From there the trunkline runs north through an interchange with US Highway 12 (US 12) into Niles along a route that was once part of Business US 12 (Bus. US 12). North of Niles, the highway runs parallel to a river and a rail line through rural areas. The northern terminus is on Interstate 94 (I-94) west of Paw Paw.

There were two other highways that bore the M-51 designation. The first connected Holland and Grand Rapids with the birth of the highway system in 1919. After the creation of the United States Numbered Highway System in 1926, the number was moved to a different highway in The Thumb area. That second highway was scaled back and later decommissioned in the 1960s. The current highway dates back to 1971 when the southern end of M-40 was rerouted, and the previous alignment was given the M-51 moniker. It was extended to the state line in 1998 to complete the current highway.

== Route description ==
M-51 starts at the Indiana state line as a continuation of SR 933 into Michigan. The trunkline runs north through residential areas along 11th Street into Niles. On the south side of town, it meets US 12 before continuing northward through commercial areas. Between the intersections with Maple and Main streets, M-51 splits into a one-way pair of streets to follow 12th Street northbound and 11th Street southbound. Oak Street marks the western end of Bus. M-60, and M-51 turns westward on Main Street into downtown Niles. At 5th Street, the highway turns north again to exit downtown. The highway crosses a rail line owned by Amtrak before curving northeasterly near the Plym Park Golf Course. M-51 angles parallel to the Dowagiac River and the Amtrak line as the highway crosses from Berrien County into Cass County. The landscape transitions to farmland along the river, and the highway turns to the east between Sumnerville and Pokagon.

Past Pokagon, M-51 turns back northeasterly toward Dowagiac. Once the highway reaches that city, it merges with M-62. The two highways run concurrently eastward along Spruce, Main and Division streets through downtown. M-51 turns to the north along Front Street, separating from the concurrency and leaving downtown. North of town in rural Cass County, M-51 intersects M-152 near the location where the highway crosses the Dowagiac River. North of that intersection, the trunkline crosses into Van Buren County and turns to the east again. M-51 passes south of Knickerbocker Lake before turning northeasterly parallel to the rail line along Delaware Street in Decatur. after which is heads due north to I-94.

M-51 is maintained by MDOT like other state highways in Michigan. As a part of these maintenance responsibilities, the department tracks the volume of traffic that uses the roadways under its jurisdiction. These volumes are expressed using a metric called annual average daily traffic, which is a statistical calculation of the average daily number of vehicles on a segment of roadway. MDOT's surveys in 2010 showed that the highest traffic levels along M-51 were the 20,298 vehicles daily south of US 12; the lowest counts were the 2,658 vehicles per day west of Decatur. M-51 between US 12 and the state line has been listed on the National Highway System, a network of roads important to the country's economy, defense, and mobility.

== History ==
=== Previous designations ===
When the state highway system was originally signed in 1919, M-51 was initially designated from Holland to Grand Rapids. The highway ran from Zeeland along a route that used Byron Road and 32nd Avenue to connect with Port Sheldon Street in Jenison before connecting with Chicago Drive. The highway's course was simplified by 1924 to use Chicago Drive between Zeeland and Jenison. When the US Highway System debuted in 1926, this original M-51 was renumbered as an extension of M-21, and the M-51 number was reused for the original M-27 in The Thumb. The highway ran from Port Huron to M-83 (now M-142) west of Harbor Beach. The designation of M-51 from Port Huron to M-46 was removed in late 1961, and the remainder to M-142 was removed in 1965.

=== Current designation ===
In 1971, all of M-40 south of I-94 to Niles was reassigned the designation M-51 while M-40 was shifted to the east to take over the routing of the contemporary M-119 between Paw Paw and its intersection with US 12 in Porter Township near Mottville. The routing of M-51 was extended down to the state line in April 1998 when US 33 was decommissioned out of the state of Michigan; the extension formed a concurrency with Business US 12 (Bus. US 12) through Niles in the process. In early 2010, the central section of Bus. US 12 was transferred to the City of Niles. In doing so, the Bus. US 12 designation was decommissioned in the city, removing that designation from the M-51 concurrency.

== Major intersections ==
County	Location	mi	km	Destinations	Notes
Berrien	Niles Township	0.000	0.000	SR 933 south – South Bend	Indiana state line
Berrien	Niles Township	2.823– 2.835	4.543– 4.562	US 12 (Pulaski Highway) – Sturgis, New Buffalo	Former interchange, converted to at-grade intersection in 2024
Berrien	Niles	4.629	7.450	Bus. M-60 east	Eastern terminus of Bus. M-60
Cass	Dowagiac	18.370	29.564	M-62 north – Eau Claire	Western end of M-62 concurrency
Cass	Dowagiac	19.238	30.961	M-62 south – Cassopolis	Eastern end of M-62 concurrency
Cass	Silver Creek–Wayne township line	24.243	39.015	M-152 west	Eastern terminus of M-152
Van Buren	Paw Paw Township	40.314– 40.405	64.879– 65.026	I-94 – Detroit, Chicago	Exit 56 on I-94
1.000 mi = 1.609 km; 1.000 km = 0.621 mi: Concurrency terminus
