= Pine River Township, Michigan =

Civil township in Michigan, US

- Civil township
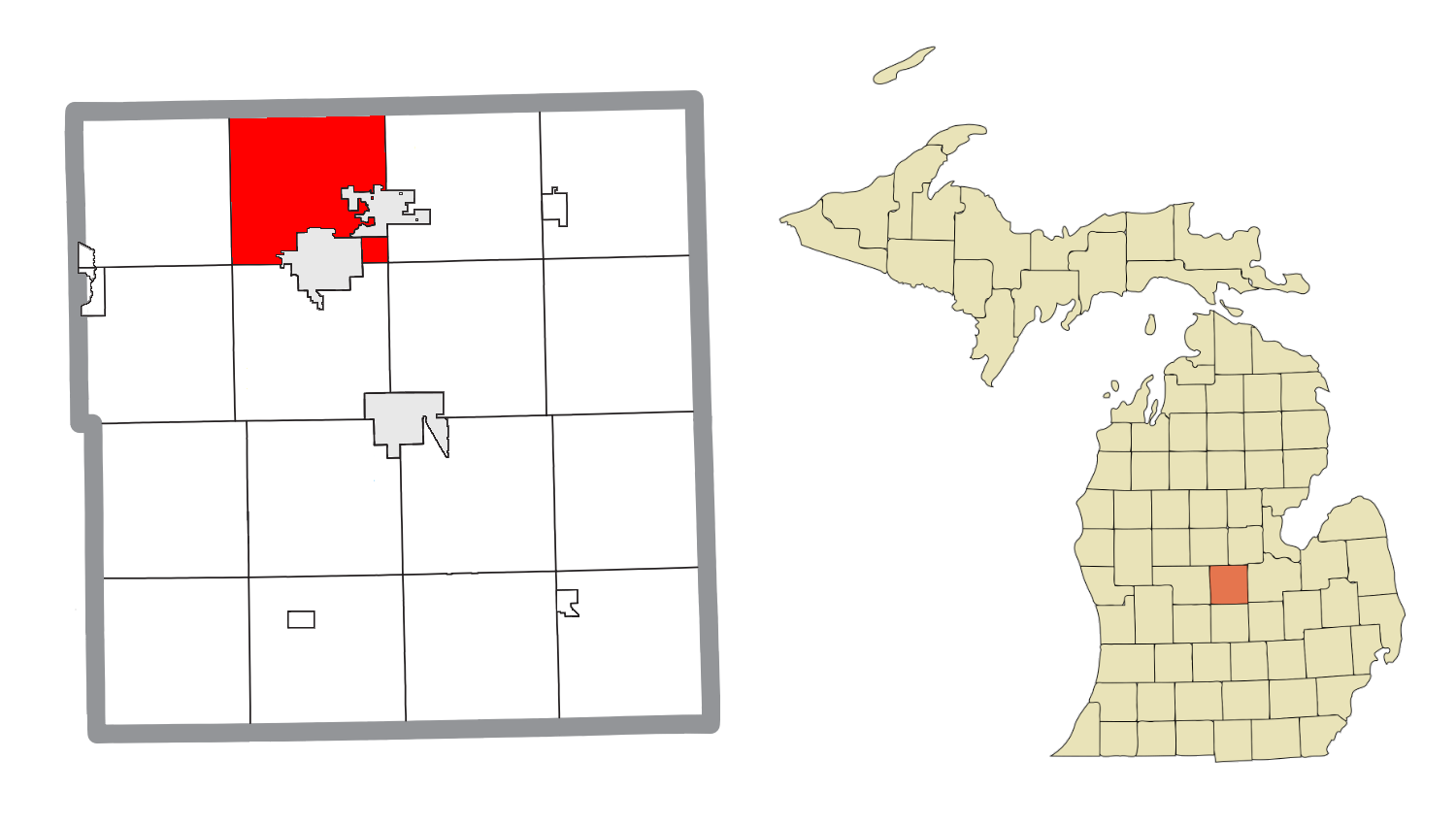
- Location within Gratiot County

- Location within the state of Michigan Location within the United States
- Coordinates: 43°24′55″N 84°39′42″W
- Country: United States
- State: Michigan
- County: Gratiot

Area
  - Total: 30.8 sq mi (79.8 km^{2})
  - Land: 30.7 sq mi (79.5 km^{2})
  - Water: 0.077 sq mi (0.2 km^{2})
- Elevation: 761 ft (232 m)

Population (2020)
  - Total: 2,348
  - Density: 76.5/sq mi (29.5/km^{2})
- Time zone: UTC-5 (Eastern (EST))
  - Summer (DST): UTC-4 (EDT)
- FIPS code: 26-64360
- GNIS feature ID: 1626905
- Website: pinerivermi.gov

Pine River Township is a civil township of Gratiot County in the U.S. state of Michigan. The population was 2,348 at the 2020 census.

== Communities ==
- Forest Hill is an unincorporated community in the township at 43°26′12″N 84°41′08″W. It was first platted in 1857, four miles from its current site, then moved to its present site when a major road was built in the area. Forest Hill had its own post office until 1957.

== Geography ==
According to the United States Census Bureau, the township has a total area of 30.8 square miles (80 km^{2}), of which 30.7 square miles (80 km^{2}) is land and 0.1 square miles (0.26 km^{2}) (0.29%) is water.

== Demographics ==
As of the census of 2000, there were 2,451 people, 912 households, and 704 families residing in the township. The population density was 79.8 inhabitants per square mile (30.8/km^{2}). There were 983 housing units at an average density of 32.0 per square mile (12.4/km^{2}). The racial makeup of the township was 96.04% White, 0.29% African American, 0.49% Native American, 0.37% Asian, 0.04% Pacific Islander, 1.43% from other races, and 1.35% from two or more races. Hispanic or Latino of any race were 3.26% of the population.

There were 912 households, out of which 33.3% had children under the age of 18 living with them, 66.1% were married couples living together, 7.6% had a female householder with no husband present, and 22.8% were non-families. 19.2% of all households were made up of individuals, and 8.8% had someone living alone who was 65 years of age or older. The average household size was 2.61 and the average family size was 2.96.

In the township the population was spread out, with 24.9% under the age of 18, 6.5% from 18 to 24, 26.6% from 25 to 44, 24.9% from 45 to 64, and 17.1% who were 65 years of age or older. The median age was 40 years. For every 100 females, there were 98.3 males. For every 100 females age 18 and over, there were 95.5 males.

The median income for a household in the township was $36,615, and the median income for a family was $39,632. Males had a median income of $36,250 versus $21,958 for females. The per capita income for the township was $16,504. About 4.9% of families and 6.3% of the population were below the poverty line, including 7.4% of those under age 18 and 7.4% of those age 65 or over.
