= Cass District Library =

Library system in Michigan, United States

- Cass District Library Logo
- Location: Cassopolis, MI, United States
- Type: Public Library
- Established: January 1, 1993
- Branches: 5

Collection
- Size: 69,050

Access and use
- Circulation: 120,078
- Population served: 36,026

Other information

Cass District Library is the library system which services Calvin, Howard, Jefferson, LaGrange, Mason, Milton, Newberg, Ontwa, Penn, Pokagon, Porter and Volinia Townships in Cass County, Michigan, United States.

Currently the Cass District Library has a total of five libraries located around Cass County. The Cass District Library has a staff of 19 people. It services a population of almost 37,000 people covering almost 500 square miles (1,300 km^{2}). The library is a community gathering place as they allow the public to use two meeting rooms at no charge.

== History ==
The start of the current library systems has its roots in 1871, when the Legislature created the Cassopolis Reading Room and Library Association. The objective of the society was "the establishment and maintenance of a library and reading room; the procuring and furnishing of lectures on literary and scientific subjects, scientific and intellectual improvements". By 1889 the library had 1400 volumes and was open two hours per week for members of the association to circulate books.

The village of Cassopolis received funds from Andrew Carnegie to establish a public library in Cassopolis; in 1909 building of the LaGrange Township Library was completed (today this building is home to the Local History Branch of the library system). The Cass County board of supervisors purchased a building for a new library in December 1959. The handsome, flagstone-fronted structure required extensive repairs before the library could be opened. The library eventually outgrew this building. Construction of a new 18,000 sq ft (1,700 m^{2}) Cass County Library building, on a 22-acre (89,000 m^{2}) property, was completed in 1977.

This is the marble plaque which has been placed on the right as patrons enter the library, to highlight that the building was a gift from Andrew Carnegie to the township.

In February 1973 the Cass County Library founded the Mason-Union Branch Library in the Mason District Number 5 Schoolhouse in Edwardsburg, Michigan. The building is listed on both the National Register of Historic Places and Michigan Register of Historic Places. Constructed in 1874–1875, at a cost of $3,000.00, the building is atypical for its era, with Italianate architecture. The building is noted in the registry for its unusual size and architectural distinction.

The LaGrange Library closed its doors in 1993 when the Cass County Library joined with the LaGrange Township Library to form the Cass District Library.

== Local history collections ==
The Local History Library has a unique and original collection of books and information on the history of the area, with the primary focus being on Cass County. The history branch specializes in genealogy and research. This branch houses the histories of countless families.

In talking about the 100th anniversary of the library Wuepper said, “We can shed light on marriages, birth, death … all the important things in life, coming in and going out…” the library holds those details in its 100-year-old walls." This library is a piece of Americana from the early twentieth century … I feel very privileged and lucky and I think the people feel lucky that we have such an intact Carnegie library."

The library also maintains a large microfilm collection of local newspapers.

Cassopolis Vigilant, 1872-2005
Dowagiac Times, 1888-1910
Dowagiac Republican, 1881—1889
Cass County Republican, 1860—1864
Marcellus News, 1887-1994
Edwardsburg Argus, 1879–1975, 1997, 2004-2005
The National Democrat (pub. at Cassopolis), 1851–1913;
The Niles Republican (Niles, MI), 1839-1862
Niles Gazette & Advertiser, 1835-1837
Niles Intelligencer, 1838–1841, 1858-1860

In addition to the collection of microfilmed papers which the local history branch holds, the library holds detailed information on the births, marriages, and deaths of residents. The library is home to several different collections of local books and information on the different communities around the area. The collection of records included list of burials at a large number of local cemeteries along with a collection of local funeral home records.

== Branch libraries ==
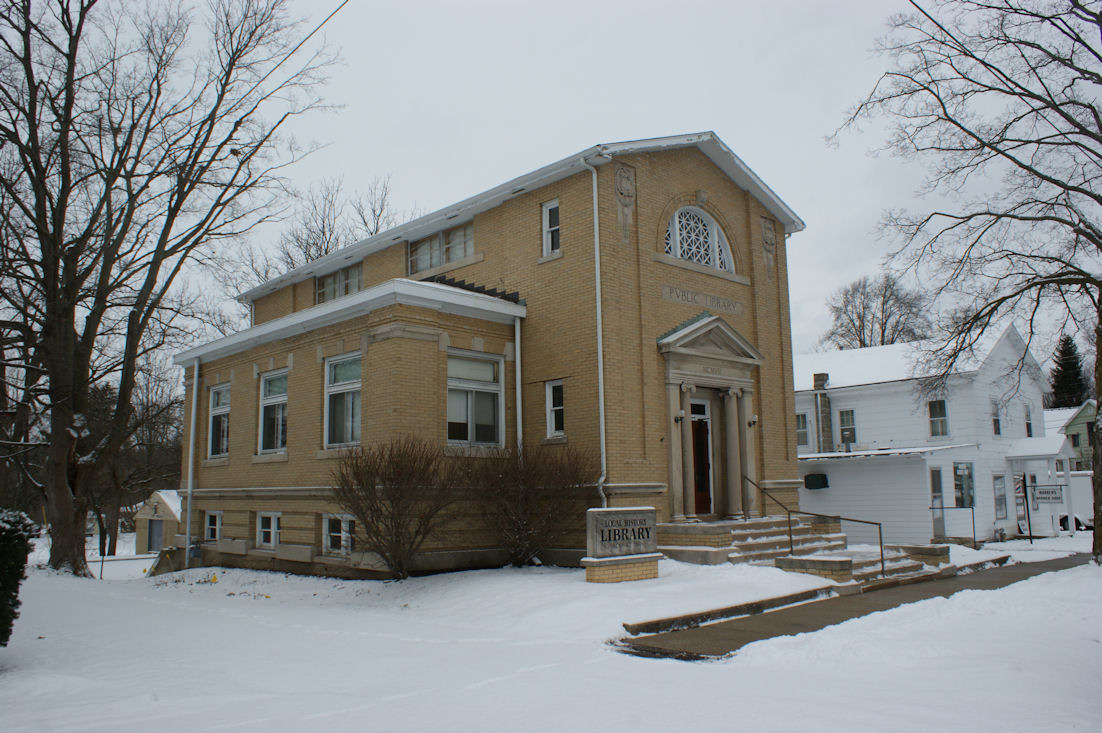
A view of the Local History Library in downtown Cassopolis, Michigan. This building was home to the former LaGrange Township Library donated by Andrew Carnegie.

Cassopolis Main Library
Edwardsburg Library
Howard Library
Local History Library

Mason/Union Library

== Board members ==
The library district is governed by a board of trustees. The library's board is composed of eight members. The county of Cass appoints four of the members, while Howard Township, Mason Township, LaGrange Township, and the Village of Edwardsburg appoint the other four members.

== Grants award ==
In 2000 the library received $67,301 of $4.8 million in grant money from the Bill and Melinda Gates Foundation.
