= Kentucky raid in Cass County (1847) =

The Kentucky raid in Cass County was conducted by slaveholders and slave catchers who raided Underground Railroad stations in Cass County, Michigan to capture black people and return them to slavery. After unsuccessful attempts, and a lost court case, the Fugitive Slave Act of 1850 was enacted. Michigan's Personal Liberty Act of 1855 was passed in the state legislature to prevent the capture of formerly enslaved people that would return them to slavery.

== Background ==
Cass County—particularly Calvin, Penn, and Porter townships—was settled by Quakers from Ohio and Indiana and free blacks beginning in 1829. They became a network of people who provided freedom seekers with food, shelter, and transportation along the Underground Railroad to sites in Canada, where slavery was illegal. Two Underground Railroad lines operated in Michigan. One was the Quaker line, which brought freedom seekers north from the Ohio River. Another was the northeasterly route, the Illinois line, from St. Louis.

Cass County was the starting point for the Central Michigan Route that had stops every 15 miles between Cass County and Detroit, Michigan. Stations were at Climax, Battle Creek, Marshall, Albion, Grass Lake, Ann Arbor, Plymouth, and Detroit, where they crossed into Canada (Sandwich First Baptist Church).

The Underground Railroad had delivered formerly enslaved people into Michigan at an increasing rate over the 1840s. In some cases, men traveled to Bourbon County, Kentucky to transport enslaved men and women to Cass County, where some Quakers provided shelter and transportation to freedom seeker's ultimate destination. Some settled in Michigan, others continued their travel to Canada. William Holman Jones of Calvin Township and Wright Modlin of Williamsville brought many bondspeople into the county, frustrating the slaveholders in Kentucky. They sent a spy from Kentucky to Cass County, who familiarized himself with the Quakers who were Underground Railroad stationmasters and conductors. The spy returned to Kentucky and the information was used to plan a raid.

== Raid ==
Thirteen men (Note: Or up to 30 heavily armed men. It was the largest raid of its kind in Michigan.) from Kentucky came to Cass County in August 1847 and broke into smaller groups to hunt down formerly enslaved people. They captured nine former slaves at Quaker farms, including the Shugart, Osborn, East, and Bogue properties. When it became known that slave catchers and owners had kidnapped nine people, a group formed of white and free black abolitionists to stop the Kentuckians. One crowd was more than 300 people.

The group faced off with the slave catchers in Vandalia at O'Dell's Mill, owned by James O'Dell. (Note: O'Dells Mill, located along Christiana Creek, was a stop on the Underground Railroad from the 1830s to the Civil War. A historic marker is located near the site of the mill along Milo Barnes Park and M-60 in Vandalia.) Outnumbered and believing that they were in the right due to the Fugitive Slave Act of 1793, the Kentuckians agreed to stand trial in Cassopolis and posted bond to get out of jail. The nine former slaves were held at a local tavern. Fourteen men from Kentucky were arrested for trespass, assault and battery, and kidnapping.

== Trials ==
Three days after the confrontation, a trial was conducted. Charges were filed by white and free black abolitionists and Quakers. The men from Kentucky provided documentation to prove ownership of the enslaved people. The case was tried by Ebenezer Mcllvain, a Berrien County Court Commissioner, who was also a conductor on the Underground Railroad in Niles. Mcllvain ruled that Kentucky did not have the correct paperwork. They showed bills of sale, but they did not have a certified copy of the Kentucky statutes that showed that slavery was legal. Mcllvain released the nine captives and 34 more freedom seekers traveled on the Underground Railroad to sites in Canada. (Note: Eby states that 45 people (9 captives + 36 others), traveled along the UGRR at this time.)

In late 1849, slaveholders sued ten men in the United States District Court in Detroit for the value of their freed slaves. The defendants were Commissioner Ebenezer Mcllvain, William Jones, and David T. Nicholson, as well as Quakers Zachariah Shugart, Joel East, Ishamel Lee, Steven Bogue, and Josiah, Jefferson, and Ellison Osborn. Jacob Merritt Howard, who later drafted the Thirteenth Amendment to the United States Constitution that abolished slavery, represented the defendants. He argued that the Fugitive Slave Act of 1793 was no longer valid, due to subsequent case law. After more than two years, the trial was settled when David T. Nicholson agreed to pay more than $2,000 (equivalent to $77,400 in 2025) in court costs. The Kentuckians did not receive any compensation. (Note: Eby states that it was about $3,000 in court costs and damages.)

== Repercussions ==
Southern slaveholders, believed by historians to be friends of Senator Henry Clay, called for a stricter fugitive slave law, and with Clay's assistance, the Fugitive Slave Act of 1850 was passed by the Congress, making it more dangerous to aid and harbor freedom seekers. Clay argued about the damage done to his fellow Kentuckians from the fallout of the raid of 1847, which helped him pass the bill. Erastus Hussey, an Underground Railroad stationmaster and state senator, helped enact Michigan's Personal Liberty Act of 1855 to prevent returning people to slavery. The growing tension between abolitionists and slaveholders led to the Civil War.

This event may have been the reason that Sampson Sanders decided to send his manumitted slaves to Cass County. Sanders became the largest landholder in Cabell County, West Virginia, and was a large slaveholder, with 51 enslaved men, women, and children. He decided to manumit each of them upon his death. In 1849, through the provisions of his will, he provided them with land and equipment in Cass County, Michigan, and money to get established. They moved north as a group.

== Legacy ==
- "Crossroads to Freedom", a monument located at the Cass County Courthouse, commemorates the role of the Quakers in Michigan's Underground Railroad and the Kentucky slave raid of 1847. It was installed by the county and state bar associations.
- The documentary Kentucky Raid 1847 of Cass County, produced by Sally Connor, tells the story of the freedom seekers, those how tried to help them, and the raid intended to return them to slavery.

== Bibliography ==
- Rogers, Howard S. (1875). History of Cass county, from 1825 to 1875. Cassopolis, Michigan: W. H. Mansfield, Vigiland Book and Job Print. p. 129.
