= Wright Modlin =

Underground Railroad agent

- Born: March 26, 1797; Back Creek, Randolph County, North Carolina
- Died: December 20, 1866 (aged 69); Berrien County, Michigan
- Other names: Wright Maudlin
- Occupation(s): Farmer and teamster
- Known for: As Underground Railroad conductor, he was a central figure in the Kentucky raid on Cass County of 1847 and The South Bend Fugitive Slave Case of 1849
- Spouse: Mary Wickersham (m. 1817, d. 1838) Martha Rowlett (m. 1838) Martha Rould (m. 1847) (Note: In 1850, his wife was named Eliza. She appears to have died or left Modlin and her two daughters who remained at home by 1860. It may be that Martha Rowlett, Martha Rould, and Eliza may all be Martha Eliza Jeanes, who married George Rowlett, left her husband in 1837, took up with Modlin in a (common-law) marriage in 1838, but did not officially marry him until 1847 - because he was said to have had five children with Martha Jeanes Rowlett, and the 1850 census shows five children with Eliza. There is no marriage record for Modlin in 1838.)
- Parent(s): Benjamin and Lea Maudlin

Wright Modlin or Wright Maudlin (Note: Records about his parents and during the time that he lived in Indiana, generally refer to him as Wright Maudlin. In Michigan, he was more commonly known as Wright Modlin.) (1797–1866) helped enslaved people escape slavery, whether transporting them between Underground Railroad stations or traveling south to find people that he could deliver directly to Michigan. Modlin and his Underground Railroad partner, William Holden Jones, traveled to the Ohio River and into Kentucky to assist enslave people on their journey north. Due to their success, angry slaveholders instigated the Kentucky raid on Cass County of 1847. Two years later, he helped free his neighbors, the David and Lucy Powell family, who had been captured by their former slaveholder. Tried in South Bend, Indiana, the case was called The South Bend Fugitive Slave Case.

== Personal life ==
Wright Modlin—born March 26, 1797, in Back Creek, Randolph County, North Carolina — was the eldest son of Leah Copeland and Benjamin Maudlin. His siblings were Samuel, Peninnah, Thomas, John, Sarah, Rachel, and Susanah. Modlin's parents, who had been slave-holders, manumitted their bondspeople and moved north with their neighbors. They lived in a Quaker community in Whitewater, Wayne County of the Indiana Territory and attended the Whitewater Monthly Meeting and the Ohio Valley Yearly Meeting.

On December 4, 1817, Wright Modlin married Mary Wickersham, who was born April 3, 1785. They were married in Wayne County of the Indiana Territory, where they lived into the 1830s. They had four children by 1830. In 1837, Modlin ran off with Martha Rowlett, the wife of George B. Rowlett of Richmond, Indiana. (Note: Mull states that Modlin lived in Kentucky when he ran off with his neighbor's wife, but it appears that Modlin and the Rowletts were living in Richmond, Indiana at the time. Rowlett sued Modlin (Maudlin in the title of the suit) and Martha for adultery. There are no other known sources or records that reported that he lived in Kentucky.) (Note: Martha Jeannes married George B. Rowlett on September 2, 1829 in Montgomery, Pennsylvania. They attended the Horsham Monthly Meeting and the Philadelphia Yearly Meeting at that time. On August 26, 1833, Martha Rowlett requested a certificate for herself, her husband George, and their three children to transfer from the Abington Monthly Meeting in Pennsylvania to the White Water Monthly Meeting in Indiana.) His wife Mary died around 1838. Around 1838, he married Martha Jeanes Rowley (Rowlett), with whom they had five children.

He worked for a planter in Indiana who did not pay him, so he ran off with some of his employer's enslaved people. He continued to help people escape slavery along the Underground Railroad. In the 1840s, he moved to Williamsville, where he was a member of the Quaker community. (Note: He was also said to have had no church affiliation.) He married Martha Rould in Cass County on April 8, 1847. In 1850, he worked as a teamster and lived with Eliza in Porter Township, Cass County, Michigan. They had five children from the age of 11 to 3: Eliza, Amanda, Wright, Jefferson, and Emily. Ten years later, he lived with just two daughters, E. and Emily, in Calvin Township of Cass County. He died in Berrien County, Michigan on December 20, 1866.

== Career ==
Modlin was a farmer and a teamster. In Williamsville, he established a farm and a house, which was used as an Underground Railroad station.

== Underground Railroad ==
Modlin was a "slave runner", along with William Holden Jones of Calvin Township. The men traveled to Kentucky and Ohio to transport freedom seekers north into free soil, which meant that they could avoid a number of stops along the Underground Railroad. Modlin was also a scout and spy. He often brought freedom seekers north through Indiana into Michigan. The ultimate destination was Canada, across the Detroit River from Detroit, Michigan.

=== Beautiful Girl ===
Modlin helped a young fair-skinned woman called "Beautiful Girl" from Kentucky. They stopped at the Erastus Hussey house in Battle Creek, Michigan, where she was disguised as an old woman with a sunbonnet that covered much of her face. As Modlin drove her towards the Detroit River, they were followed by four slave catchers. They escaped being found out by pretending to be a couple looking for land to buy. After the men on horseback left, they continued to drive on to the Detroit River. Minutes after she was in a boat bound for the Canadian shore, the slave catchers rode up and saw her in the river, but it was too late for them to capture her.

=== The South Bend Fugitive Slave Case ===
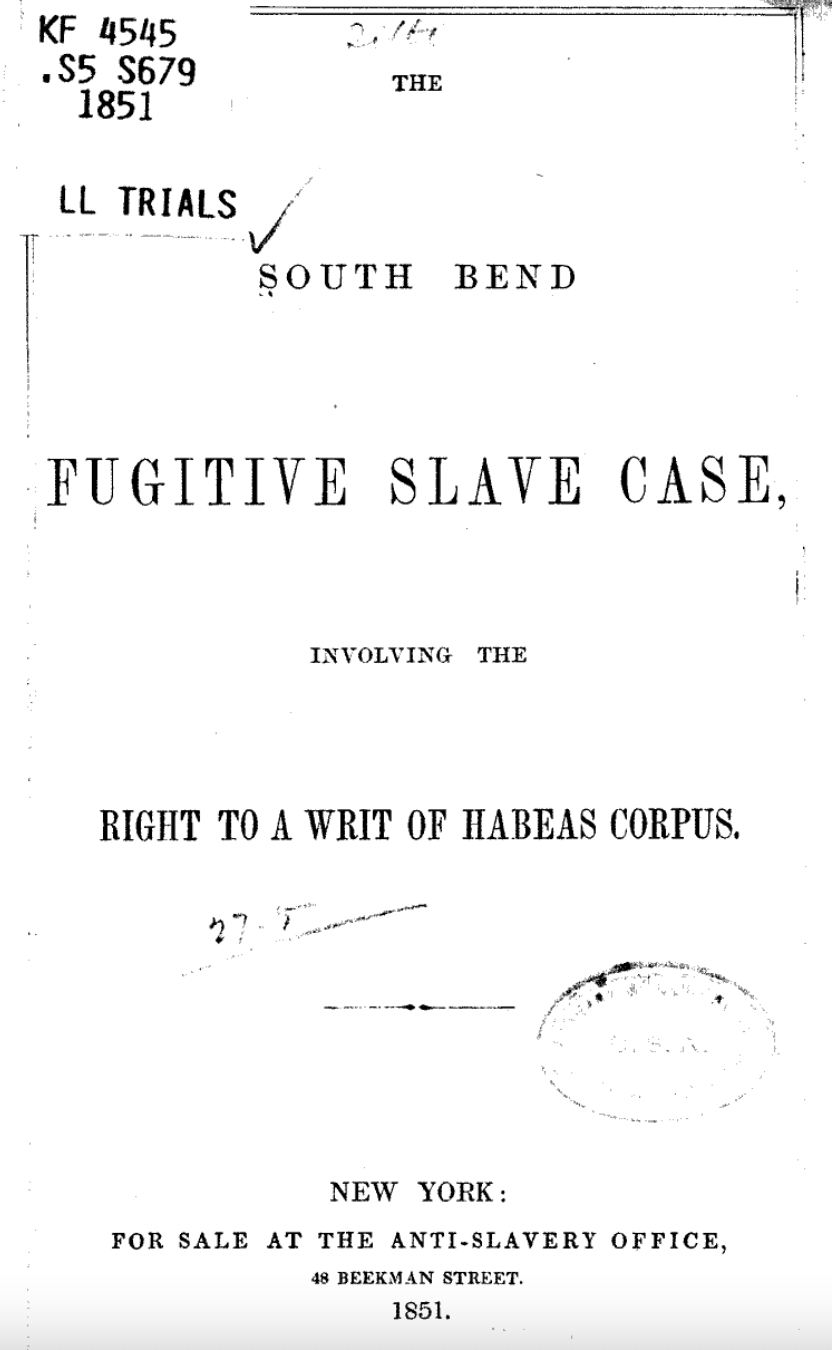
The South Bend fugitive slave case: involving the right to a writ of habeas corpus, 1851, image from the Library of Congress

On October 9, 1847, David and Lucy Powell, and their sons, George, James, Lewis, and Samuel, escaped from their slaveholder, John Norris of Boone County, Kentucky. After heading north into free states, they settled near Cassopolis, Michigan, where they operated a farm. In the middle of the night, on September 27, 1849, Norris broke into the Powell's house with eight armed men and captured Lucy and three of her sons. David and one of their sons were out for the evening. Tied up, Lucy and her sons were put into a wagon and headed for Kentucky. Modlin, who was their neighbor, raced on his horse to South Bend, Indiana, about a twenty-mile ride. Modlin hired attorney Edwin B. Cocker who petitioned for a writ of habeas corpus before Judge Elisha Egbert, who issued the writ. In the meantime, Norris, the slave catchers, and the Powells went to a spot about a mile south of South Bend. A deputy sheriff served Norris the writ and the Powells were brought to South Bend.

Judge Egbert ruled that Norris did not have a certificate for recapturing his slaves, as required by the Fugitive Slave Act of 1793. He ordered the Powells to be freed. Norris and his cohorts brandished weapons in the courtroom, and it was learned that he had a writ according to an Indiana law of 1824 that helped slaveholders recapture their former slaves. The Powells were put in jail for the weekend to await the trial on Monday. The family's neighbors, black and white citizens, came to South Bend en masse, which caused Norris to retreat and decide to drop the case. Instead, he sued for damages. The incident was called The South Bend Fugitive Slave Case of 1849 and was the name of the anti-slavery pamphlet published about the case in 1851. The Powells subsequently moved to Canada.

=== Kentucky raid on Cass County ===
Modlin and Jones were said to have made numerous trips to the Ohio River (the border between slave states and free states) or further south into Kentucky to assist enslaved people as they traveled north. Slaveholders, frustrated at the extent to which they were losing slaves, instigated what has been called the Kentucky raid on Cass County of 1847 to recover their former slaves.
