= Porter Township, Cass County, Michigan =

Porter Township, Michigan
- Civil township
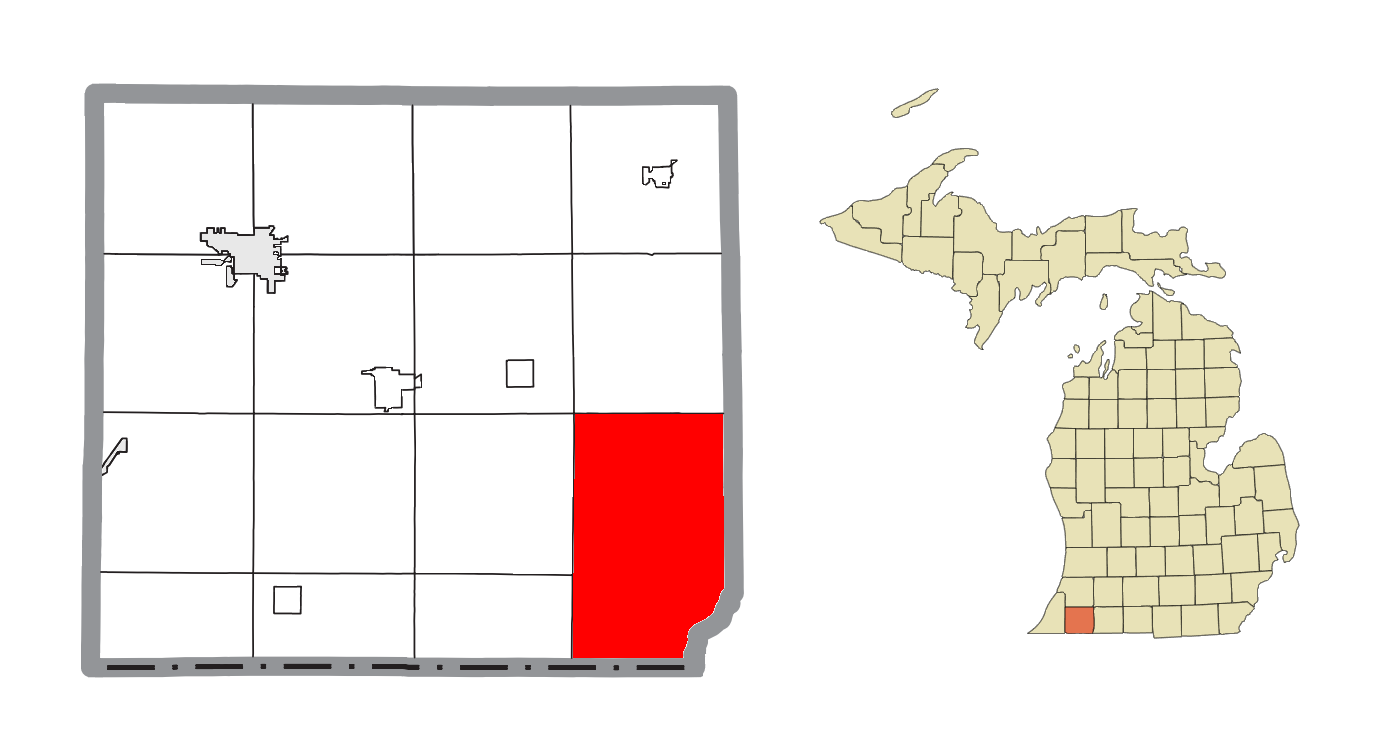
- Location within Cass County

- Location within the state of Michigan Porter Township (the United States)
- Coordinates: 41°49′08″N 85°49′38″W
- Country: United States
- State: Michigan
- County: Cass

Area
  - Total: 54.6 sq mi (141.5 km^{2})
  - Land: 51.5 sq mi (133.4 km^{2})
  - Water: 3.1 sq mi (8.1 km^{2})
- Elevation: 912 ft (278 m)

Population (2020)
  - Total: 3,750
  - Density: 72.8/sq mi (28.1/km^{2})
- Time zone: UTC-5 (Eastern (EST))
  - Summer (DST): UTC-4 (EDT)
- ZIP code(s): 49031, 49042, 49061, 49095, 49099, 49130
- Area code: 269
- FIPS code: 26-65720
- GNIS feature ID: 1626929
- Website: Official website

Porter Township is a civil township of Cass County in the U.S. state of Michigan. The population was 3,750 at the 2020 census.

== Communities ==
- Union 41°47′N 85°52′W is an unincorporated community in the southeast part of the township on US 12 at Union Rd. It has a post office.
- Williamsville is an unincorporated community in the northwest part of the township on Sears St. and Williamsville St.
- Zimmysville is an unincorporated community on the southwest part of the township near M-217

== History ==
Cass County—particularly Calvin, Penn, and Porter townships—was settled by Quakers from Ohio and Indiana and free blacks beginning in 1829. They became a network of people who provided freedom seekers with food, shelter, and transportation along the Underground Railroad to sites in Canada, where slavery was illegal. Wright Modlin, also known as Wright Maudlin, settled in Williamsville in the 1840s. He was a scout, spy, and conductor on the Underground Railroad. He made trips down to the Ohio River and into Kentucky to bring people escaping slavery directly north into Michigan. Angry slaveholders banded together for the Kentucky raid on Cass County of 1847 to recover former slaves. He was also a central figure in The South Bend Fugitive Slave Case of 1849.

== Geography ==
Porter Township is located in the southeast corner of Cass County and is bordered to the east by St. Joseph County and to the south by the state of Indiana. The St. Joseph River forms part of the township border, cutting off what would have been the southeast corner of the township.

According to the United States Census Bureau, the township has a total area of 54.6 square miles (141.5 km^{2}), of which 51.5 square miles (133.4 km^{2}) is land and 3.1 square miles (8.1 km^{2}), or 5.73%, is water.

== Demographics ==
Historical population
| Census | Pop. | Note | %± |
|---|---|---|---|
| 2000 | 3,794 | | — |
| 2010 | 3,798 | | 0.1% |
| 2020 | 3,750 | | −1.3% |

As of the census of 2000, there were 3,794 people, 1,523 households, and 1,134 families residing in the township. The population density was 73.3 inhabitants per square mile (28.3/km^{2}). There were 2,040 housing units at an average density of 39.4 per square mile (15.2/km^{2}). The racial makeup of the township was 97.36% White, 0.63% African American, 0.53% Native American, 0.08% Asian, 0.21% from other races, and 1.19% from two or more races. Hispanic or Latino of any race were 1.34% of the population.

There were 1,523 households, out of which 28.8% had children under the age of 18 living with them, 63.0% were married couples living together, 6.0% had a female householder with no husband present, and 25.5% were non-families. 20.4% of all households were made up of individuals, and 7.2% had someone living alone who was 65 years of age or older. The average household size was 2.49 and the average family size was 2.86.

In the township the population was spread out, with 23.3% under the age of 18, 6.0% from 18 to 24, 27.6% from 25 to 44, 30.0% from 45 to 64, and 13.1% who were 65 years of age or older. The median age was 42 years. For every 100 females, there were 103.3 males. For every 100 females age 18 and over, there were 103.1 males.

The median income for a household in the township was $51,320, and the median income for a family was $55,739. Males had a median income of $41,642 versus $27,004 for females. The per capita income for the township was $24,026. About 3.9% of families and 6.2% of the population were below the poverty line, including 10.3% of those under age 18 and 11.6% of those age 65 or over.
