= Mason District Number 5 Schoolhouse =

- U.S. National Register of Historic Places
- Michigan State Historic Site
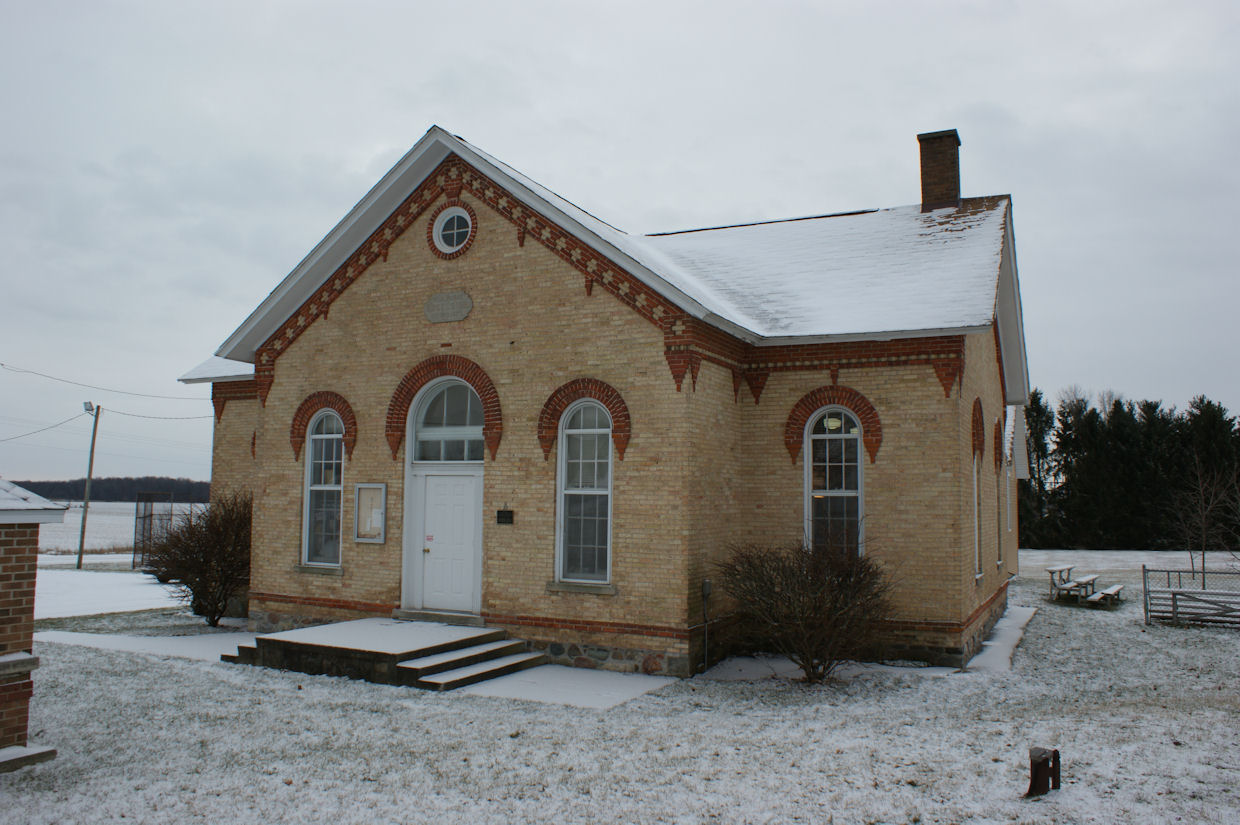
- Front of the school

- Location within Michigan Location within the United States
- Interactive map
- Location: 17049 U.S. Highway 12, Edwardsburg, Michigan
- Coordinates: 41°46′34″N 85°53′52″W
- Area: 1.2 acres (0.49 ha)
- Built: 1874
- Architectural style: T shape
- NRHP reference No.: 85002153

Significant dates
- Added to NRHP: September 12, 1985
- Designated MSHS: June 10, 1980

Mason District Number 5 Schoolhouse is a former two room rural schoolhouse in Mason Township, Cass County, Michigan built in 1874; the school could hold up to 110 students. The school operated until 1959, when the area became part of the Constantine School District. Constantine School District continued operating the schoolhouse for kindergarten through 6th grade until 1963. The building was transformed into the Mason Township Hall in 1964. In 1973 the building also became home to the Mason-Union Branch of the Cass District Library.

The school house is listed on both the National Register of Historic Sites and the Michigan registry of Historic Sites.

The current uses are still a split use government building, where the historic school house is used by the Cass District Library for the Mason-Union Branch and the new addition in the back, being used by the township.

== History ==
The Michigan Historical Marker that is placed on the grounds of the Mason School House

The school house was built between 1874 and 1875 at the cost of about $3,000. It has been known as the Sailor School and the Kessington School house. In 1964 Mason Township board bought the building for use as the township hall. In 1973 the Cass County Library founded and established a branch library in the township hall to serve the members of the South-East corner of the county. In 1987, the building was restored.

The bell that was on top of the school house was built by the Gould Mrf. Co of Seneca Falls, New York. The bell weights about 290 pounds and was shipped from New York to Mason.

The bell that sits outside the schoolhouse now has not always been with the school. After the bell was installed it stayed with the building until a reconstruction project took place on the building during the 1970s. The bell was dropped from the belfry and york was cracked or broke. The bell could not be reinstalled so it was left sitting on the ground until a local farmer bought the bell from the township, and then sold it to a family member who lived in Wichita, Kansas. Several attempts were made to buy the bell back to restore it with the building. However the owner refused to sell the bell until 1996 when he contacted the township and stated that he was willing to sell the bell. Two local people went to buy the bell and had the yoke fixed before donating it to the township. After almost 25 years after the bell was sold it was returned to the schoolhouse.

== Information from Michigan registry ==
The narrative description on file with the Michigan registry reads:

The Mason District Number 5 Schoolhouse is a one-story, T-plan, yellow brick structure resting on a fieldstone foundation. Raised dark red brick trim forms Italianate-inspired hood molds over the arched windows and door frame and trims the cornice, forming triangle-shaped downward projections which mimic the appearance of brackets. In the raking eaves, the red brick trim is inset with yellow brick crosses. A double row of red brick also forms a belt course marking the separation between the first floor and foundation on the exterior. A gable-roofed, single-story addition, constructed c. 1988, extends off of the rear of the building.

The text that is listed about the schoolhouse on the Michigan Register of sites for the Statement of Significance reads:

In size and architectural distinction, the District Number 5 Schoolhouse is far in advance of the typical late nineteenth-century rural Michigan school building. Constructed in 1875, the structure served Mason Township as a school for up to 110 students until 1959. In 1964, the schoolhouse was reopened as the township hall. Since 1972, the former District Number 5 Schoolhouse has accommodated the Mason-Union Branch of the Cass County Library as well as the township hall.

The marker text that has been placed on the site reads as follows:

DISTRICT SCHOOLHOUSE This late-Victorian schoolhouse was built in 1874-1875. Constructed at a cost of $3,000, it is made of locally manufactured yellow and red brick. The 1882 Cass County History described it as "the best rural schoolhouse in the State." Its two classrooms could accommodate 110 pupils. The school was used until the local district was absorbed into the Constantine School District in 1959. In 1964 the building became the township hall; and in 1972, the Mason Union Branch of the Cass County Library.

== Film ==
The building and the bell are highlighted in a documentary called "From Moccasins to Main Street" which was produced by Equity Studios Inc. The documentary is a tour of the Native American Sauk Trail what is now US 12.
