= Ruth Alice Armstrong =

American temperance activist

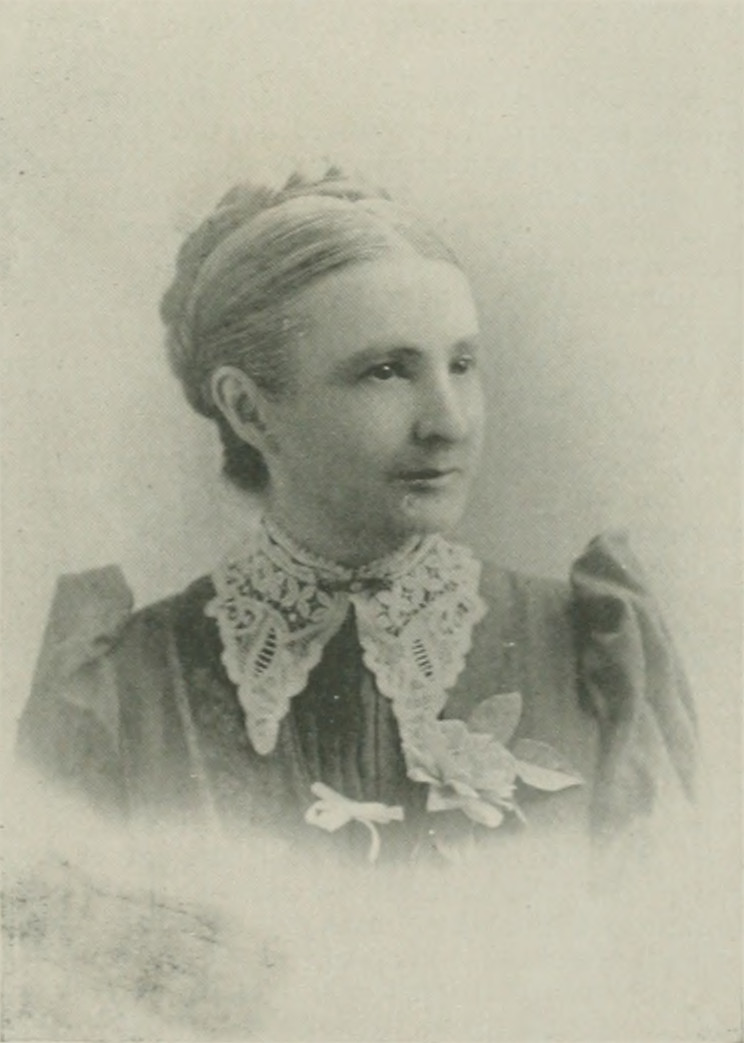
- Photo in A Woman of the Century
- Born: Ruth Alice Jones; April 30, 1850; Cassopolis, Michigan, U.S.
- Died: March 7, 1901 (aged 50); Berkeley, California, U.S.
- Resting place: Woodland Cemetery, Woodland, California, U.S.
- Occupations: social activist; writer; lecturer
- Spouse: Thomas Armstrong (m. 1874)
- Writing career
- Subjects: heredity; motherhood

Ruth Alice Armstrong (née, Jones; April 30, 1850 – March 7, 1901) was an American temperance activist. She served as the national superintendent of heredity for the Woman's Christian Temperance Union (WCTU), writing leaflets and letters of instruction for the organization. Armstrong lectured on "Heredity" and "Motherhood".

== Early life and education ==
She was born Ruth Alice Jones near Cassopolis, Michigan on April 30, 1850. Her father, Amos Jones, was from Georgia, and her mother, Rebecca Hebron, was from Yorkshire, England. Armstrong had at least one sibling, a sister, Mrs. Lydia Lawhead.

Armstrong was educated in the public schools of Michigan.

== Career ==
At the age of 18, Armstrong began teaching, while still a student. Observing the smaller salaries paid to women than were paid to men for like services, she left her native State for California, but not until she had made an effort to bring about a better state of affairs for coming generations by aiding in the organization of the first woman suffrage society of her native county.

In 1874, she married Thomas Armstrong, a livestock rancher of Trinity County, California. He believed in the social and civil equality of men and women, and that a wife should be a companion not only in the joys and sorrows of a home, but in business also, shared with her his privileges and responsibilities. Their life on their mountain livestock ranch was idyllic, spent in hard work and pleasant recreations. For four years, they lived in isolation, with no society except that furnished by a well-selected library. Just before the birth of their only child, Ruth, they moved to Woodland, California. There, Mrs. Armstrong organized a Shakespeare Club, as well as a lecture bureau, being its first president. She assisted in the organization of a literary society for the study of literature of all countries. She was the first woman ever elected to the office of trustee in the Congregational Church of Woodland, of which she was for many years a member. She left that denomination in 1891 and united with the Christian Church.

Desiring to work in moral reform, she joined the WCTU and gave her time and resources to it, organizing the county and several local unions. Her enthusiasm and common-sense made her a leader and inspirer in that society with the department of heredity as a main focus. She also planned for the education of women in maternity and other allied subjects. She was made the superintendent of heredity for the town of Woodland, next for the county, and afterwards for the National Union. Armstrong wrote leaflets and letters of instruction for the organization. Her lectures on "Heredity" and "Motherhood" carried the conviction that parenthood must be assumed as the highest, the holiest, and most sacred responsibility entrusted to us by God. She was involved in the construction of a women's building, to contain a printing office, lecture hall, as well as a home for homeless women and girls.

== Death ==
Ruth Alice Armstrong died March 7, 1901.
