= Marcellus News =

The Marcellus News
- Type: Weekly newspaper
- Format: Broadsheet
- Owner(s): Moormann Printing Inc.
- Publisher: David D. Moormann
- Editor: Ramona M. Moormann
- Founded: 1876
- Headquarters: 149 East Main Street, Marcellus, MI, 49067, United States
- Circulation: 1600
- Website: www.marcellusnews.com

Marcellus News is a weekly news publication based in the town of Marcellus, Michigan. The newspaper's motto is "The only newspaper in the world that cares about Marcellus!" The newspaper is owned and published by Moormann Printing Inc. The Marcellus News was established in 1876.
