= Vandalia, Michigan =

- Village
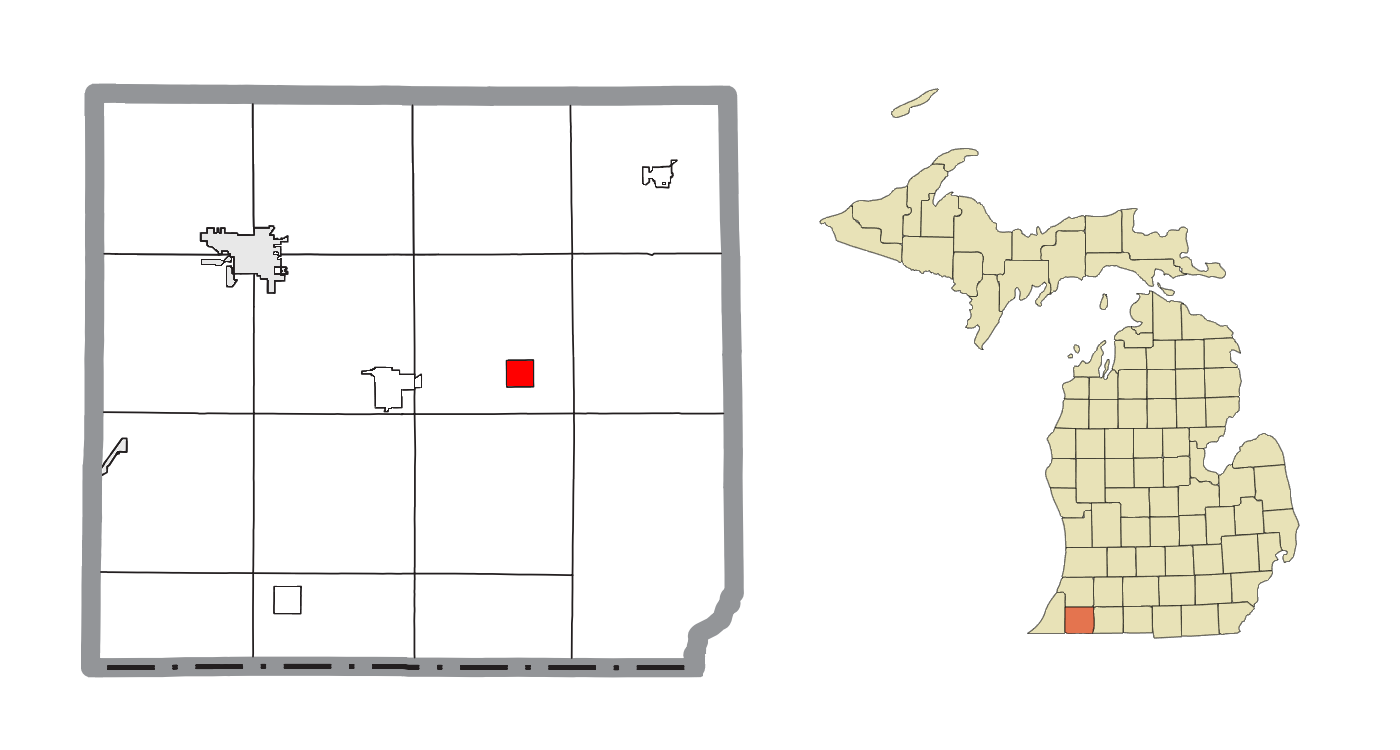
- Location within Cass County

- Location within the state of Michigan
- Coordinates: 41°55′03″N 85°54′45″W
- Country: United States
- State: Michigan
- County: Cass
- Township: Penn
- Settled: 1848
- Incorporated: 1875 (village)

Government
  - Type: Village council

Area
  - Total: 0.99 sq mi (2.56 km^{2})
  - Land: 0.99 sq mi (2.56 km^{2})
  - Water: 0 sq mi (0.00 km^{2})
- Elevation: 879 ft (268 m)

Population (2020)
  - Total: 318
  - Density: 321.7/sq mi (124.22/km^{2})
- Time zone: UTC-5 (Eastern (EST))
  - Summer (DST): UTC-4 (EDT)
- ZIP code(s): 49095
- Area code: 269
- FIPS code: 26-81680
- GNIS feature ID: 1615496
- Website: Official website

Vandalia is a village in Penn Township within Cass County in the U.S. state of Michigan. The population was 318 at the 2020 census. It is part of the South Bend–Mishawaka, IN-MI, Metropolitan Statistical Area sometimes referred to as Michiana.

== History ==
The Village of Vandalia was incorporated in 1875 all in thanks to Stephen Bogue and Charles P. Ball who in the years of 1848–49 built a gristmill on this settlement that soon would be call Vandalia.

On July 8, 1850, Theron J Wilcox was the colony's first postmaster and Ada Kinsbury is credited with being the area’s first merchant. and the Michigan Central Railroad built a station in 1871.

Vandalia hosted a station of the Underground Railroad. An Underground Railroad memorial sign resides at Milo E. Barnes Park just off M-60. Other locations in Penn Township, in which Vandalia is located, also were affiliated with the Underground Railroad.

Vandalia is also known as the nearest incorporated community to the defunct Rainbow Farm.

== Geography ==
According to the United States Census Bureau, the village has a total area of 0.99 square miles (2.56 km^{2}), all land.

== Demographics ==
Historical population
Census	Pop.	Note	%±
1880	439		—
1890	423		−3.6%
1900	407		−3.8%
1910	371		−8.8%
1920	331		−10.8%
1930	373		12.7%
1940	360		−3.5%
1950	360		0.0%
1960	357		−0.8%
1970	427		19.6%
1980	447		4.7%
1990	357		−20.1%
2000	429		20.2%
2010	301		−29.8%
2020	318		5.6%
U.S. Decennial Census

=== 2010 census ===
As of the census of 2010, there were 301 people, 107 households, and 77 families residing in the village. The population density was 304.0 inhabitants per square mile (117.4/km^{2}). There were 141 housing units at an average density of 142.4 per square mile (55.0/km^{2}). The racial makeup of the village was 41.5% White, 42.2% African American, 0.3% Native American, 7.6% Asian, 1.7% from other races, and 6.6% from two or more races. Hispanic or Latino of any race were 1.7% of the population.

There were 107 households, of which 36.4% had children under the age of 18 living with them, 43.9% were married couples living together, 21.5% had a female householder with no husband present, 6.5% had a male householder with no wife present, and 28.0% were non-families. 23.4% of all households were made up of individuals, and 6.5% had someone living alone who was 65 years of age or older. The average household size was 2.81 and the average family size was 3.29.

The median age in the village was 39.3 years. 25.6% of residents were under the age of 18; 7% were between the ages of 18 and 24; 25.2% were from 25 to 44; 25.2% were from 45 to 64; and 16.9% were 65 years of age or older. The gender makeup of the village was 53.2% male and 46.8% female.

=== 2000 census ===
As of the census of 2000, there were 429 people, 127 households, and 101 families residing in the village. The population density was 432.5 inhabitants per square mile (167.0/km^{2}). There were 157 housing units at an average density of 158.3 per square mile (61.1/km^{2}). The racial makeup of the village was 37.3% White, 47.6% African American, 0.2% Native American, 8.4% Asian, 1.2% from other races, and 5.4% from two or more races. Hispanic or Latino of any race were 2.6% of the population.

There were 127 households, out of which 41.7% had children under the age of 18 living with them, 49.6% were married couples living together, 22.0% had a female householder with no husband present, and 19.7% were non-families. 15.7% of all households were made up of individuals, and 6.3% had someone living alone who was 65 years of age or older. The average household size was 3.38 and the average family size was 3.69.

In the village, the population was spread out, with 38.5% under the age of 18, 10.3% from 18 to 24, 25.9% from 25 to 44, 15.4% from 45 to 64, and 10.0% who were 65 years of age or older. The median age was 26 years. For every 100 females, there were 111.3 males. For every 100 females age 18 and over, there were 103.1 males.

The median income for a household in the village was $30,417, and the median income for a family was $31,750. Males had a median income of $28,462 versus $21,875 for females. The per capita income for the village was $11,394. About 12.9% of families and 14.7% of the population were below the poverty line, including 13.9% of those under age 18 and 15.4% of those age 65 or over.

Vandalia Students are bussed to Cassopolis.

== Transportation ==
- M-60

== Education ==
Vandalia is zoned to Cassopolis Public Schools.
