= Cassopolis, Michigan =

- Village
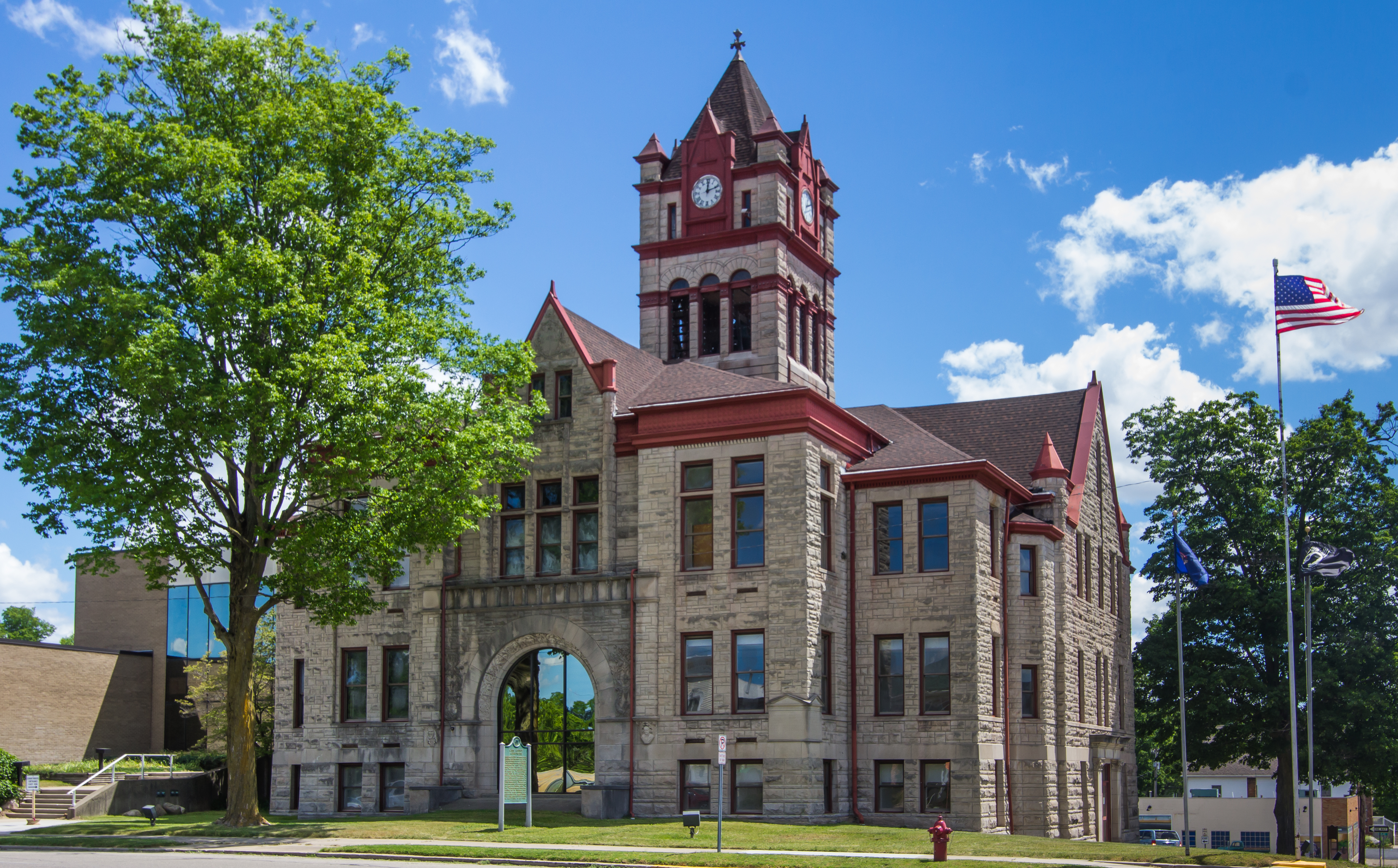
- Cass County Courthouse in Cassopolis

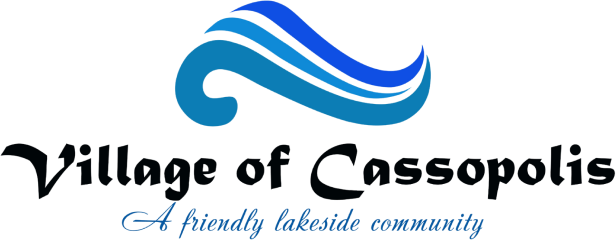
- logo
- Nickname: AmstutzVille
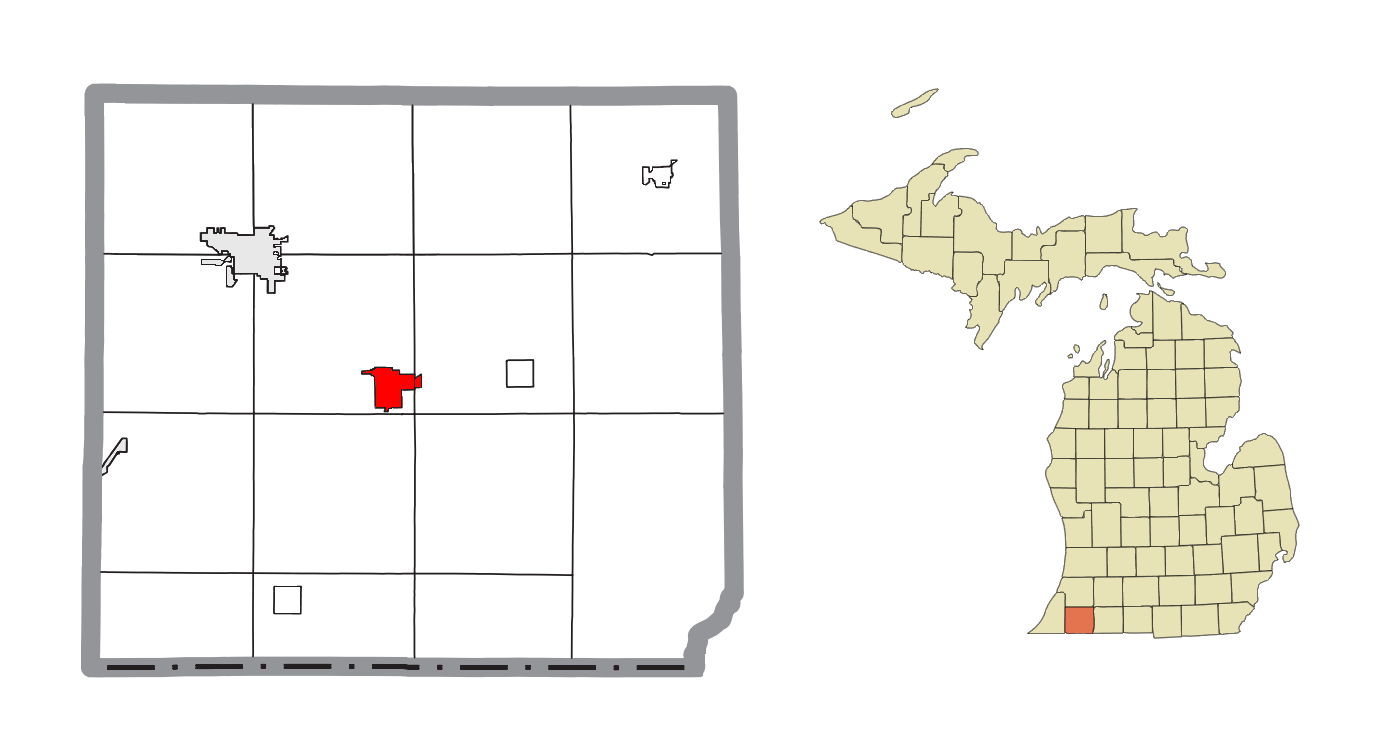
- Location within Cass County

- Location within the state of Michigan
- Coordinates: 41°54′39″N 86°00′28″W
- Country: United States
- State: Michigan
- County: Cass
- Townships: LaGrange and Penn

Government
  - Type: Village council
  - President: David Johnson

Area
  - Total: 2.24 sq mi (5.79 km^{2})
  - Land: 2.01 sq mi (5.21 km^{2})
  - Water: 0.22 sq mi (0.58 km^{2})
- Elevation: 889 ft (271 m)

Population (2020)
  - Total: 1,712
  - Density: 851/sq mi (328.7/km^{2})
- Time zone: UTC−5 (Eastern (EST))
  - Summer (DST): UTC−4 (EDT)
- ZIP code(s): 49031
- Area code: 269
- FIPS code: 26-13900
- GNIS feature ID: 0622860
- Website: Official website

Cassopolis (/kəˈsɒpəlɪs/ kə-SOP-ə-liss) is a village in the U.S. state of Michigan and the county seat of Cass County. It is located mostly in LaGrange Township with a small portion extending east into Penn Township. The village and county are named after statesman Lewis Cass, a New Hampshire native and a prominent U.S. senator from Michigan prior to the American Civil War.

Cassopolis is part of the South Bend–Mishawaka, IN-MI, Metropolitan Statistical Area sometimes referred to as Michiana. The population was 1,712 at the 2020 census.

== History ==
Cassopolis was platted by European Americans in 1831. It had already been designated the county seat by that point. It was incorporated as a village in 1863. The county developed farming and some industry.

Cassopolis was a transit point on the Underground Railroad, by which sympathizers aided refugee slaves from the South to gain freedom in the North and in Canada. Some refugees continued through Michigan to settle in Canada in order to avoid risk under the 1850 Fugitive Slave Act, which increased incentives for capture. Others remained in the area, with many African-Americans and people of mixed African-American and Sapponi and Pumenkey ancestry settling in Cass County.

In the 1960s, a group of African Americans connected to the Nation of Islam acquired some 1,000 acres of farmland in the area. Work on this acquisition was overseen by a man who had graduated from Cassopolis High.

== Geography ==
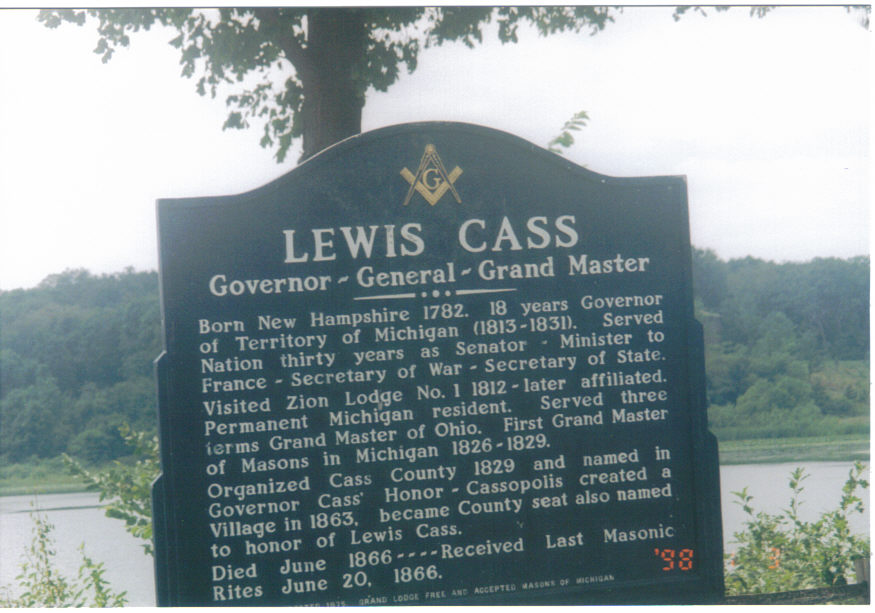
Lewis Cass historical marker in Cassopolis, Michigan

According to the United States Census Bureau, the village has a total area of 2.25 square miles (5.83 km^{2}), of which 2.00 square miles (5.18 km^{2}) is land and 0.25 square miles (0.65 km^{2}) is water. Cassopolis is the town associated with Diamond Lake, the largest lake in southwestern Michigan.

== Demographics ==
Historical population
Census	Pop.	Note	%±
1850	379		—
1870	728		—
1880	912		25.3%
1890	1,369		50.1%
1900	1,330		−2.8%
1910	1,358		2.1%
1920	1,385		2.0%
1930	1,448		4.5%
1940	1,488		2.8%
1950	1,527		2.6%
1960	2,027		32.7%
1970	2,108		4.0%
1980	1,933		−8.3%
1990	1,822		−5.7%
2000	1,740		−4.5%
2010	1,774		2.0%
2020	1,712		−3.5%
U.S. Decennial Census

=== 2020 census ===
As of the 2020 census, Cassopolis had a population of 1,712. The median age was 39.3 years. 23.5% of residents were under the age of 18 and 15.7% of residents were 65 years of age or older. For every 100 females there were 96.6 males, and for every 100 females age 18 and over there were 97.0 males age 18 and over.

0.0% of residents lived in urban areas, while 100.0% lived in rural areas.

There were 735 households in Cassopolis, of which 29.8% had children under the age of 18 living in them. Of all households, 30.5% were married-couple households, 24.8% were households with a male householder and no spouse or partner present, and 36.3% were households with a female householder and no spouse or partner present. About 40.5% of all households were made up of individuals and 18.8% had someone living alone who was 65 years of age or older.

There were 820 housing units, of which 10.4% were vacant. The homeowner vacancy rate was 3.9% and the rental vacancy rate was 4.4%.

Racial composition as of the 2020 census
Race	Number	Percent
White	1,055	61.6%
Black or African American	372	21.7%
American Indian and Alaska Native	6	0.4%
Asian	33	1.9%
Native Hawaiian and Other Pacific Islander	0	0.0%
Some other race	52	3.0%
Two or more races	194	11.3%
Hispanic or Latino (of any race)	68	4.0%

=== 2010 census ===
As of the census of 2010, there were 1,774 people, 709 households, and 384 families residing in the village. The population density was 887.0 inhabitants per square mile (342.5/km^{2}). There were 833 housing units at an average density of 416.5 per square mile (160.8/km^{2}). The racial makeup of the village was 60.0% White, 29.3% African American, 1.1% Native American, 2.4% Asian, 0.1% Pacific Islander, 1.5% from other races, and 5.6% from two or more races. Hispanic or Latino of any race were 4.5% of the population.

There were 709 households, of which 32.9% had children under the age of 18 living with them, 31.5% were married couples living together, 15.8% had a female householder with no husband present, 6.9% had a male householder with no wife present, and 45.8% were non-families. 40.8% of all households were made up of individuals, and 17.7% had someone living alone who was 65 years of age or older. The average household size was 2.32 and the average family size was 3.15.

The median age in the village was 35.4 years. 25.5% of residents were under the age of 18; 10.5% were between the ages of 18 and 24; 28.1% were from 25 to 44; 22.8% were from 45 to 64; and 13.4% were 65 years of age or older. The gender makeup of the village was 50.3% male and 49.7% female.

=== 2000 census ===
As of the census of 2000, there were 1,740 people, 703 households, and 437 families residing in the village. The population density was 994.1 inhabitants per square mile (383.8/km^{2}). There were 780 housing units at an average density of 445.6 per square mile (172.0/km^{2}). The racial makeup of the village was 54.60% White, 32.59% African American, 0.57% Native American, 3.62% Asian, 0.80% from other races, and 7.82% from two or more races. Hispanic or Latino of any race were 2.18% of the population.

There were 703 households, out of which 33.4% had children under the age of 18 living with them, 40.4% were married couples living together, 16.6% had a female householder with no husband present, and 37.7% were non-families. 33.9% of all households were made up of individuals, and 11.8% had someone living alone who was 65 years of age or older. The average household size was 2.47 and the average family size was 3.13.

In the village, the age distribution of the population shows 30.0% under the age of 18, 8.7% from 18 to 24, 29.0% from 25 to 44, 21.1% from 45 to 64, and 11.1% who were 65 years of age or older. The median age was 34 years. For every 100 females, there were 89.3 males. For every 100 females age 18 and over, there were 83.2 males.

The median income for a household in the village was $28,696, and the median income for a family was $37,348. Males had a median income of $29,688 versus $21,036 for females. The per capita income for the village was $14,359. About 9.4% of families and 13.9% of the population were below the poverty line, including 13.8% of those under age 18 and 13.5% of those age 65 or over.

== Education ==
Cassopolis Public School District is the school system for the Village of Cassopolis and its surrounding areas. The district's schools are Ross Beatty High School, Squires Middle School, and Sam Adams Elementary.

In 2020, the school district split up the junior and senior high school into Ross Beatty High School and Squires Middle School Ross Beatty High School teaches grades nine through twelve. Squires Middle School teaches grades six through eight.

The Cass District Library's Main Library is located in Cassopolis. The Local History Branch is also located in Cassopolis. Other branches include the Howard Branch, Edwardsburg Branch, and the Mason / Union Branch.

== Notable people ==
- Dennis Archer, 67th Mayor of Detroit; Michigan Supreme Court justice; president of the American Bar Association; grew up in Cassopolis
- Ruth Alice Armstrong, social activist
- Iven Kincheloe, test pilot and aviation pioneer, grew up in Cassopolis
- Kevin Loder, small forward and shooting guard for the Kansas City Kings, and San Diego Clippers; born in Cassopolis
- Ed Lowe, inventor of cat litter; grew up in Cassopolis
