= Erastus Hussey =

American politician

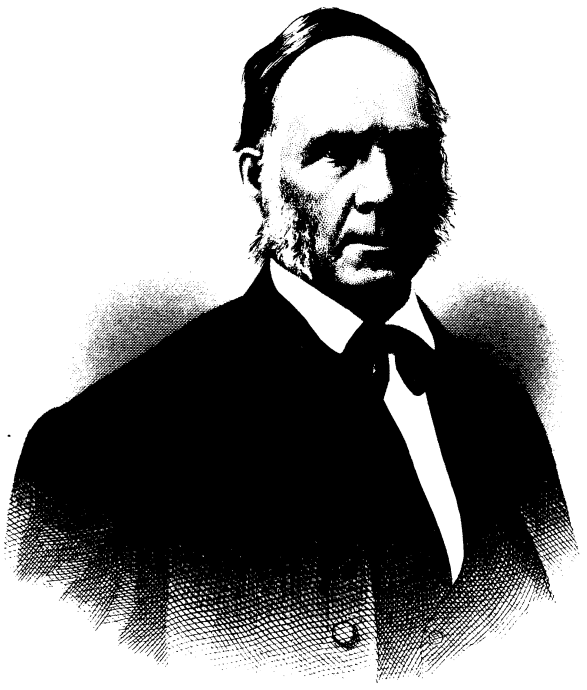
- Born: December 5, 1800; Scipio, Cayuga County, New York
- Died: January 21, 1889 (aged 88)} Battle Creek, Michigan
- Occupations: Farmer, businessman, editor, legislator in Michigan House of Representatives and Michigan Senate, Mayor of Battle Creek
- Known for: Station master on the Underground Railroad, co-founder of the Republican Party
- Political party: Republican Party (United States)
- Other political affiliations: Whig, Liberty Party
- Spouse: Sarah E. Bowen Hussey
- Children: Susan Hussey Denman

Erastus Hussey (1800–1889) was a leading abolitionist, a stationmaster on the Underground Railroad, and one of the founders of the Republican Party. He supported himself and his family as a farmer, teacher, businessman, legislator, and editor.

== Personal life ==
Erastus Hussey was born in Scipio, Cayuga County, New York on December 5, 1800. He grew up on a farm located on the eastern shore of Cayuga Lake. He augmented his school education from books in an extensive library and became a schoolteacher. He saved his earnings to travel west, he first walked (140 miles (230 km)) to Buffalo, New York, then took a boat to Detroit. He arrived on September 25, 1824, and the following month, he was the first purchaser of land in Plymouth, Michigan.

On February 21, 1827, Hussey married Sarah E. Bowen, whose parents were Lucretia and Benjamin Bowen. The Husseys had a daughter, Susan, who married Henry B. Denman, who was his father's business partner in the 1840s. Hussey died January 21, 1889, at his house in Battle Creek. Sarah died March 22, 1899, in Battle Creek.

== Career ==
Hussey settled in Plymouth with a 160-acre farm, where he was a wheat farmer from 1827 to 1836. In September 1838, he moved to Battle Creek, and established a general store there in 1839. Henry B. Denman became his partner in 1843 and they operated the dry goods store named Hussey & Denman until 1847.

He advocated for free education, paid for by a general tax. He was a director of the school system for three years and was also a trustee. His wife Sarah founded the Ladies' Library Association.

In 1847, he was the editor of the anti-slavery newspaper, Michigan Liberty Press. In the Spring of 1849, a fire destroyed the newspaper building. Originally a Whig, he joined the Liberty Party, which had a firmer position against slavery. He was a member of Michigan's Anti-Slavery Society.

Hussey was elected to several terms in city offices. He was elected to the Michigan House of Representatives, serving the Fifteenth Legislature in 1850. On July 6, 1854, Hussey attended the "Under the Oaks" convention in Jackson, Michigan, where the Republican Party had one of its earliest meetings.

Representing Calhoun County, he sat on the Printing committee. Elected as a Republican, he served in the Michigan Senate, where he represented Calhoun County in the 13th district, in 1855 and 1856. He sat on Finance, Federal Relations, and State Prison committees. He helped introduce Michigan's Personal Freedom Act of 1855. The bill was enacted to prevent former slaves from being kidnapped and returned to slavery. It was also called the Personal Liberty Bill. Battle Creek became a city in 1859. He was one of the first aldermen of the city.

Hussey was a delegate to the 1860 Republican National Convention, where Abraham Lincoln was nominated as a presidential candidate. In 1867, he was elected mayor of Battle Creek.

== Underground Railroad ==
Hussey learned about the Underground Railroad when a man from Indiana, John Cross, asked if Hussey would operate a station in Battle Creek. Strong Quakers, the Husseys were outspoken opponents of slavery and by 1840 they began hiding escaping slaves in their home. Soon the Hussey home had become one of the main stations on the Underground Railroad. Their station was located along the Central Michigan Route that had stops every 15 miles between Cass County and Detroit, Michigan. Stations were at Climax, Battle Creek, Marshall, Albion, Grass Lake, Ann Arbor, Plymouth, and Detroit, where they crossed into Canada (Sandwich First Baptist Church).

A station master on the Underground Railroad, he helped more than 1,000 or 2,000 people escape slavery. The Husseys aided Samuel Strother who settled in Battle Creek. Hussey spoke of some of the people who passed through his and his wife's house:

A slave woman who had been here about a week was assisting my wife with her work when a party of slaves drove up. Among the number was her daughter whom she had not seen in 10 years. The recognition was mutual and the meeting was a very affecting sight… One day a fugitive and his wife came to my house for shelter. He had been a slave of Wade Hampton (South Carolina) and some called him by that name. Hampton worked about here for three days. One day while we were at dinner, Jim Logan came walking in. The colored woman gave a shriek, jumped up from the table and almost fainted… She and Jim had been engaged to be married in Kentucky, not having heard from him in two years, she had married Wade Hampton.

He once heard that there was a group of slaveowners who were traveling through Michigan. He printed a warning on newspaper broadsides that they should not enter Battle Creek. He traveled west within the state to Niles, where he met up with the slaveowners and delivered the handbills to them. They did not visit Battle Creek.

== Legacy ==
- A historical marker was placed at the site of their house, from which they operated an Underground Railroad station.
- Erastus Hussey, his wife Sarah, and Harriet Tubman are represented in a bronze statue designed by Ed Dwight. It is located in Battle Creek's Linear Park. Commissioned by the W.K. Kellogg Foundation, it is the largest tribute to the Underground Railroad, 14 feet (4.3 m) high and 28 feet (8.5 m) wide. It memorializes all the people of the Underground Railroad who helped enslaved people become free at the risk of imprisonment, injury, or death.
- A historical plaque on the grounds of the Kellogg Foundation Headquarters in Battle Creek quotes Hussey as saying, "I have fed and given protection to over 1,000 fugitives, and assisted them on to Canada". The plaque goes on to say that when Hussey was asked if any stationmaster had been paid, he had answered, "No.... We were working for humanity."
