= Penn Township, Michigan =

- Civil township
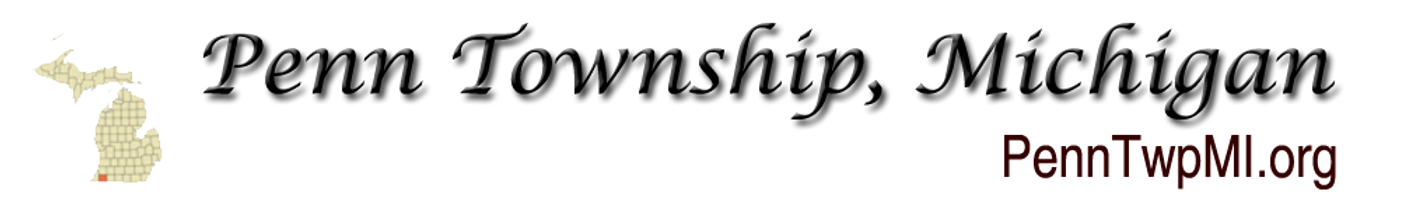
- logo

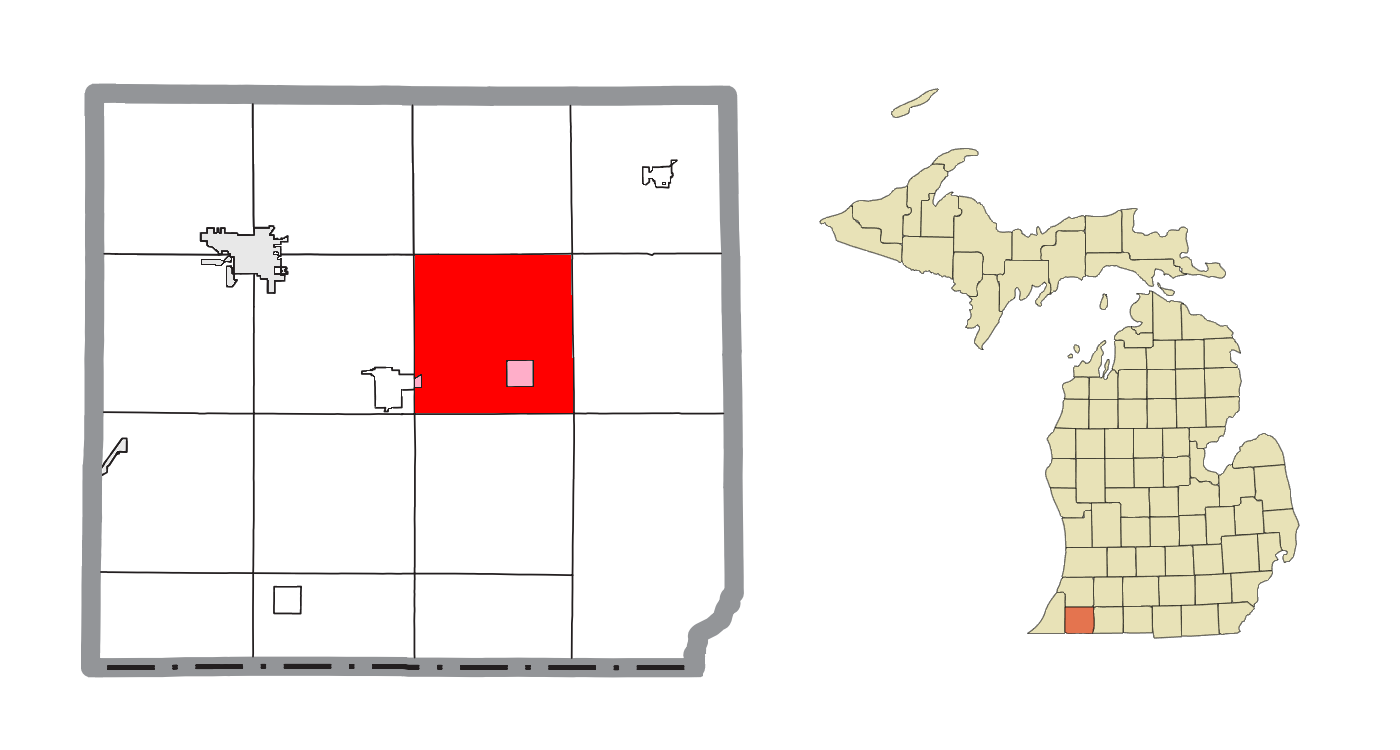
- Location within Cass County (red) and the administered villages of Vandalia and a portion of Cassopolis (pink)

- Location within the state of Michigan Penn Township (the United States)
- Coordinates: 41°56′17″N 85°55′31″W
- Country: United States
- State: Michigan
- County: Cass

Area
  - Total: 35.4 sq mi (91.7 km^{2})
  - Land: 33.6 sq mi (86.9 km^{2})
  - Water: 1.8 sq mi (4.7 km^{2})
- Elevation: 889 ft (271 m)

Population (2020)
  - Total: 1,755
  - Density: 52.3/sq mi (20.2/km^{2})
- Time zone: UTC-5 (Eastern (EST))
  - Summer (DST): UTC-4 (EDT)
- ZIP code(s): 49031, 49095
- Area code: 269
- FIPS code: 26-63380
- GNIS feature ID: 1626890
- Website: www.penntwpmi.org

Penn Township is a civil township of Cass County in the U.S. state of Michigan. The population was 1,755 at the 2020 census.

Penn Township is the location of the Bonine House, a lookout post on the Underground Railroad, on the corner of M-60 and Penn Road. Vandalia, located within Penn Township, also was affiliated with the Underground Railroad.

== Communities ==
- Geneva was platted in 1831. It was the county seat at the time but not for much longer. The area is now known as Shore Acres.

== Geography ==
Penn Township is located just northeast of the center of Cass County. The village of Vandalia is in the southeast part of the township.

According to the United States Census Bureau, the township has a total area of 35.4 square miles (91.7 km^{2}), of which 33.6 square miles (86.9 km^{2}) is land and 1.8 square miles (4.7 km^{2}), or 5.18%, is water. Diamond Lake in the southwest and Donnell Lake in the southeast are the two largest lakes in the township.

== Demographics ==
Historical population
Census	Pop.	Note	%±
2000	1,902		—
2010	1,774		−6.7%
2020	1,755		−1.1%

As of the census of 2000, there were 1,902 people, 747 households, and 560 families residing in the township. The population density was 56.5 inhabitants per square mile (21.8/km^{2}). There were 1,280 housing units at an average density of 38.0 per square mile (14.7/km^{2}). The racial makeup of the township was 82.07% White, 12.36% African American, 0.58% Native American, 2.10% Asian, 0.37% from other races, and 2.52% from two or more races. Hispanic or Latino of any race were 1.00% of the population.

There were 747 households, out of which 26.9% had children under the age of 18 living with them, 60.2% were married couples living together, 9.6% had a female householder with no husband present, and 25.0% were non-families. 21.3% of all households were made up of individuals, and 8.6% had someone living alone who was 65 years of age or older. The average household size was 2.54 and the average family size was 2.91.

In the township the population was spread out, with 25.1% under the age of 18, 8.0% from 18 to 24, 22.9% from 25 to 44, 28.5% from 45 to 64, and 15.5% who were 65 years of age or older. The median age was 41 years. For every 100 females, there were 102.6 males. For every 100 females age 18 and over, there were 99.3 males.

The median income for a household in the township was $38,375, and the median income for a family was $43,077. Males had a median income of $32,167 versus $24,769 for females. The per capita income for the township was $19,462. About 9.9% of families and 13.6% of the population were below the poverty line, including 17.8% of those under age 18 and 8.1% of those age 65 or over.

== Education ==
Most of Penn Township is zoned to Cassopolis Public Schools. A northeast portion is zoned to Marcellus Community Schools.
