= National Register of Historic Places listings in Berrien County, Michigan =

Location of Berrien County in Michigan

This is a list of the National Register of Historic Places listings in Berrien County, Michigan.

This is intended to be a complete list of the properties and districts on the National Register of Historic Places in Berrien County, Michigan, United States. Latitude and longitude coordinates are provided for many National Register properties and districts; these locations may be seen together in a map.

There are 34 properties and districts listed on the National Register in the county.

This National Park Service list is complete through NPS recent listings posted August 21, 2026.

== Current listings ==
	Name on the Register	Image	Date listed	Location	City or town	Description
1	Avery Road-Galien River Bridge	Avery Road-Galien River Bridge	December 17, 1999 (#99001577)	Avery Rd. over the Galien River; 41°52′27″N 86°33′17″W	Weesaw Township	
2	Berrien Springs Courthouse	Berrien Springs Courthouse	February 16, 1970 (#70000265)	313 North Cass Street, Berrien Springs, MI 49103; 41°56′53″N 86°20′28″W	Berrien Springs	Built in 1838, and fully operational by April 1839, this is Michigan's oldest courthouse, and was identified as such by the Michigan State Senate on May 23, 1974 and by the Michigan House of Representatives on June 17, 1974. It was placed on the National Register of Historic Places in 1970, and designated as "Michigan Historic Building Number Fifty" in 1968. It is still identified as an active courthouse as defined in MCL - Section 600.1515 of the Michigan Legislature.
3	Blossomland Bridge	Blossomland Bridge	December 17, 1999 (#99001576)	M-63 over the St. Joseph River; 42°06′45″N 86°28′40″W	St. Joseph	
4	Buchanan Downtown Historic District	Buchanan Downtown Historic District	September 2, 2009 (#09000678)	Front Street, between 117 West and 256 East; parts of Main Street, between 108 and 210-212; and 114 N. Oak Street; 41°49′39″N 86°21′37″W	Buchanan	
5	Buchanan North and West Neighborhoods Historic District	Buchanan North and West Neighborhoods Historic District	November 30, 2011 (#11000863)	Roughly bounded by Main, 4th, Chippewa, W. Front, S. Detroit, Chicago, Clark, Roe, and Charles Sts. 41°49′42″N 86°21′54″W	Buchanan	
6	Henry A. Chapin House	Henry A. Chapin House	July 30, 1981 (#81000304)	508 E. Main St. 41°49′45″N 86°15′12″W	Niles	
7	Clark Equipment Company Administrative Complex	Clark Equipment Company Administrative Complex	March 13, 2023 (#100008725)	301-324 East Dewey St. and 204-302 North Red Bud Trail; 41°49′41″N 86°21′26″W	Buchanan	
8	Eden Springs Park	Eden Springs Park	December 26, 2023 (#100009649)	789 M-139; 42°06′12″N 86°26′05″W	Benton Harbor	
9	Rock S. Edwards Farmstead	Rock S. Edwards Farmstead	July 21, 1995 (#95000868)	3503 Edwards Rd. (Sodus Pkwy.); 42°03′10″N 86°22′21″W	Sodus Township	
10	Ferry Street Historic District	Ferry Street Historic District	January 15, 2025 (#100011316)	527-801 north side of Ferry Street; 514-814 south side of Ferry Street; 701-815 north side of Sycamore; 323 North 5th Street; 308-410 North Sixth Street; 307-402 North Seventh Street; 307-410 North Eighth Street; and 310 North Ninth Street; 41°49′54″N 86°15′05″W	Niles	
11	Fidelity Building	Fidelity Building	February 14, 2002 (#02000042)	162 Pipestone St. 42°06′52″N 86°27′15″W	Benton Harbor	
12	Fort St. Joseph Site	Fort St. Joseph Site	May 24, 1973 (#73000944)	Bond St. along the St. Joseph River; 41°48′54″N 86°15′39″W	Niles	
13	Lakeside Inn	Lakeside Inn	July 16, 2009 (#09000521)	15251 Lakeshore Rd. 41°50′49″N 86°40′32″W	Lakeside	
14	Ring Lardner House	Ring Lardner House	March 16, 1972 (#72000595)	519 Bond St. 41°49′22″N 86°15′17″W	Niles	
15	Mary's City of David	Mary's City of David	April 15, 2009 (#09000201)	1158 E. Britain Ave. 42°06′32″N 86°25′51″W	Benton Charter Township	
16	Moccasin Bluff Site	Moccasin Bluff Site	April 13, 1977 (#77000710)	Red Bud Trail; 41°51′20″N 86°22′00″W	Buchanan	
17	Niles Downtown Historic District	Niles Downtown Historic District	June 21, 2007 (#07000568)	Sycamore, Main, and Cedar between Front and 5th 41°49′47″N 86°15′22″W	Niles	
18	Niles Railroad Depot	Niles Railroad Depot	September 19, 1979 (#09000085)	598 Dey St. 41°50′14″N 86°15′08″W	Niles	
19	Ninth District Lighthouse Depot	Ninth District Lighthouse Depot	December 2, 1993 (#93001348)	128 N. Pier; 42°06′51″N 86°29′09″W	St. Joseph	
20	North Watervliet Road-Paw Paw Lake Outlet Bridge	North Watervliet Road-Paw Paw Lake Outlet Bridge	December 17, 1999 (#99001575)	N. Watervliet Rd. over Paw Paw Lake outlet 42°12′28″N 86°15′00″W	Watervliet Township	Demolished in 2008
21	Oak Ridge Cemetery	Oak Ridge Cemetery	May 8, 2024 (#100010296)	818 Terre Coupe Rd. 41°49′30″N 86°22′45″W	Buchanan	
22	Old Berrien County Courthouse Complex	Old Berrien County Courthouse Complex	April 29, 1982 (#82004941)	Roughly bounded by Cass, Kimmel, Madison, and Union Sts. 41°56′53″N 86°20′28″W	Berrien Springs	
23	Old US Post Office	Old US Post Office	September 12, 1985 (#85002152)	322 E. Main St. 41°49′46″N 86°16′02″W	Niles	
24	Paine Bank	Paine Bank	May 8, 1973 (#73000945)	1008 Oak St. 41°49′36″N 86°14′52″W	Niles	
25	Wendell P. and Harriet Rounds Robbins House	Wendell P. and Harriet Rounds Robbins House	May 2, 2007 (#07000385)	680 Pipestone St. 42°06′17″N 86°26′38″W	Benton Harbor	
26	Sandburg House	Sandburg House	April 14, 1972 (#72001470)	Poet's Path; 41°53′00″N 86°37′50″W	Harbert	
27	Shiloh House	Shiloh House	September 29, 1972 (#72000594)	1055 E. Britain Rd. 42°06′30″N 86°25′57″W	Benton Harbor	
28	South Berrien Center Union Church and Cemetery	South Berrien Center Union Church and Cemetery	December 12, 2002 (#02001506)	10408 M-140; 41°55′46″N 86°16′19″W	Berrien	
29	St. Joseph North Pier Inner and Outer Lights	St. Joseph North Pier Inner and Outer Lights	November 9, 2005 (#05001211)	On the north pier of the mouth of the St. Joseph River, 0.9 mi (1.4 km) west of the M-63 bridge 42°06′57″N 86°29′32″W	St. Joseph	
30	Union Block	Union Block	August 22, 2007 (#07000746)	114 E. Front St. 41°49′37″N 86°21′38″W	Buchanan	
31	Union Meat Market	Union Meat Market	September 22, 1972 (#72000596)	14 S. Elm St. 41°48′01″N 86°36′38″W	Three Oaks	
32	Warren Featherbone Company Office Building	Warren Featherbone Company Office Building	January 23, 1986 (#86000117)	3 N. Elm St. 41°48′05″N 86°36′38″W	Three Oaks	
33	Whitcomb Hotel	Whitcomb Hotel	November 24, 2021 (#100007206)	509 Ship St. 42°06′39″N 86°28′54″W	St. Joseph	
34	Zinc Collar Pad Company Building	Zinc Collar Pad Company Building	July 1, 2009 (#09000472)	304 S. Oak St. 41°49′30″N 86°21′40″W	Buchanan	

== Former listing ==
	Name on the Register	Image	Date listed	Date removed	Location	City or town	Description
1	Snow Flake Motel	Snow Flake Motel	April 13, 1998 (#98000270)	May 26, 2021	3822 Red Arrow Highway; 42°02′55″N 86°30′56″W	Lincoln Township	Building demolished March 27, 2006

== See also ==
- List of National Historic Landmarks in Michigan
- National Register of Historic Places listings in Michigan
- Listings in neighboring counties: Cass, LaPorte (IN), Porter (IN), St. Joseph (IN), Van Buren
- List of Michigan State Historic Sites in Berrien County, Michigan
