= List of Michigan State Historic Sites in Berrien County =

Location of Berrien County in Michigan

The following is a list of Michigan State Historic Sites in Berrien County, Michigan. Sites marked with a dagger (†) are also listed on the National Register of Historic Places in Berrien County, Michigan.

== Current listings ==
Name	Image	Location	City	Listing date
Andrews University Campus		Labardy Road	Berrien Springs	September 13, 1963
Sawyer Ball House		127 N. Paw Paw Street	Coloma	October 12, 1990
Berrien Springs Courthouse†	Berrien Springs Courthouse	312 M-139	Berrien Springs	September 22, 1968
Bertrand Informational Designation		SE corner of Bertrand Road and Bond Street	Niles Township	February 17, 1967
Black Hawk War		Chicago Road	Niles	February 12, 1959
Buchanan Downtown Historic District†		Front Street, between 117 West and 256 East; parts of Main Street, between 108 and 210-212; and 114 North Oak Street	Buchanan	September 29, 2016
Buchanan North and West Neighborhoods Historic District†		Roughly bounded by Main, 4th, Chippewa, W. Front, S. Detroit, Chicago, Clark, Roe, and Charles Sts.	Buchanan	November 15, 2016
Burnett's Post Informational Site		Miller Drive and Langley Avenue	St. Joseph	March 13, 1962
Carey Mission Informational Designation		Niles-Buchanan Road at Phillips Road	Niles	February 18, 1956
Carnegie Library		204 North Fourth Street	Niles	November 3, 1976
Henry A. Chapin House†		508 East Main Street	Niles	November 3, 1976
Chicago Hotel (Demolished)		132 North Barton Street	New Buffalo	September 10, 1979
Coloma Interurban Station	Coloma Interurban Station	220 S. Paw Paw	Coloma	October 15, 2013
Congregational Church of St. Joseph		601 Main Street	St. Joseph	August 3, 1979
Cotten House		30 East Riverside Road	Buchanan	November 7, 1977
Dewey Cannon	The Dewey Cannon	Dewey Cannon Park, 14 Maple St.	Three Oaks	August 14, 1962
John and Horace Dodge Commemorative Designation		1724 Fifth Street, intersection of Burns Street	Niles	August 29, 1996
William S. Dunbar House		814 State Street	St. Joseph	January 18, 1980
Edgewater Club Annex		375 North Ridgeway Street	St. Joseph	July 20, 1984
Ferry Street Elementary School (destroyed by fire)		620 Ferry St, SW corner of 7th Street	Niles	November 3, 1976
Fort Miami Informational Site		Lake Boulevard and Ship Street	St. Joseph	February 18, 1956
Fort St. Joseph Site (20BE23)†		South Bond Street, north of Fort Street	Niles	February 18, 1956
Four Flags Hotel		404 East Main Street	Niles	April 20, 1989
Fruit Belt Commemorative Designation	Benton Harbor Fruit Market	1911 Territorial Road	Benton Harbor	September 17, 1957
Gordon Beach Inn	Gordon Beach Inn	16220 Lakeshore Rd.	Lakeside	April 13, 2006
Herring's First Flight Informational Designation		Silver Beach, Lake Michigan lakeshore, south of Broad Street	St. Joseph	May 10, 1968
Hinchman School	Hinchman School	1286 E. Hinchman Rd.	Berrien Springs	August 3, 1979
Robert and Mary Rector Hogue House		3361 Pipestone Road	Sodus	November 17, 1994
Johnson Cemetery	Johnson Cemetery	2033 N. Old US31	Niles	June 6, 2002
Lake Michigan Sand Dunes		Oakhill Section Road	Bridgman	February 12, 1959
Lakeside Inn†		15251 Lakeshore Rd	Lakeside	2004
Ring Lardner House†		519 Bond Street	Niles	August 13, 1971
Liberty Theater (Demolished)		212 East Main Street	Benton Harbor	February 18, 1993
Mary's City of David / Israelite House of David†	Mary's City of David	1158 East Britain	Benton Charter Twp	September 22, 2009
Michigan Central Railroad Niles Depot†	Michigan Central Depot-Niles	598 Dey Street	Niles	October 15, 1992
Moccasin Bluff site (20BE8)†		Near Red Bud Trail	North of Buchanan	April 14, 1972
Morris Chapel	Morris Chapel	11729 Pucker St. by Chapel Road	Berrien Township	September 10, 1979
Morton Cemetery	Morton Cemetery	750 Territorial Road	Benton Harbor	January 17, 1986
Morton House (Indian Hotel)		501 Territorial Road	Benton Harbor	February 11, 1964
New Buffalo Welcome Center		I-94 East, near Mile Marker 1	New Buffalo	July 23, 1985
Old Berrien County Courthouse Complex†		Roughly bounded by Cass, Kimmel, Madison and Union streets	Berrien Springs	September 10, 1979
Old St. Joseph Neighborhood		State and Main Streets, and Lake Boulevard	St. Joseph	September 17, 1981
Paine Bank†		1008 Oak Street	Niles	February 19, 1958
Parc Aux Vaches Informational Designation		3038 Adams Road	Niles	December 5, 1986
Pears Mill	Pears Mills	123 South Oak Street	Buchanan	October 23, 1987
Portage Prairie United Methodist Church		2450 Orange Road	Niles	January 22, 1987
John B. Reddick Building	John B. Reddick Building	224 Front	Niles	October 11, 1990
Saint John German Lutheran Evangelical Church		200 West Buffalo Street	New Buffalo	March 20, 1984
Saint Joseph Mission	St. Joseph Mission Cemetery	50 Washington Ct.	Bertrand	September 18, 1964
Saint Joseph Public Library Building		500 Main Street, corner of Elm Street	St. Joseph	June 18, 1982
Saint Mary's Catholic Church		211 South Lincoln, SE corner of Clay Street	Niles	October 1, 1971
Carl Sandburg / Chikaming Goat Farm Informational Designation	Carl Sandburg ID	13416 Red Arrow Highway	Sawyer	February 18, 2015
Carl Sandburg House	Carl Sandburg House	13000 South Poets Path	Harbert	April 19, 2015
Sauk Trail Crossing		US-12, west of Sage Road	Bertrand	April 11, 1963
Second Baptist Church Commemorative Designation	Second Baptist Church	601 Ferry Street	Niles	November 18, 1993
Shiloh House†		1055 East Britain Road	Benton Harbor	December 10, 1971
Three Oaks Township Hall		8 East Linden Street	Three Oaks	October 23, 1986
Trinity Episcopal Church		9 South Fourth Street	Niles	April 6, 1966
Union Church and Cemetery	Union Church and Cemetery	7707 Pokagon Road	Berrien Center	September 22, 2003
Union Meat Market†		14 South Elm Street	Three Oaks	December 10, 1971
Warren Featherbone Company Office Building†		3 North Elm Street	Three Oaks	November 30, 1983
Wesley United Methodist Church		302 Cedar Street	Niles	September 10, 1979

== See also ==
- National Register of Historic Places listings in Berrien County, Michigan

== Sources ==
- Historic Sites Online – Berrien County. Michigan State Housing Developmental Authority. Accessed January 22, 2011.
