= KSFB =

Relevant Radio station in San Francisco

- Relevant Radio logo

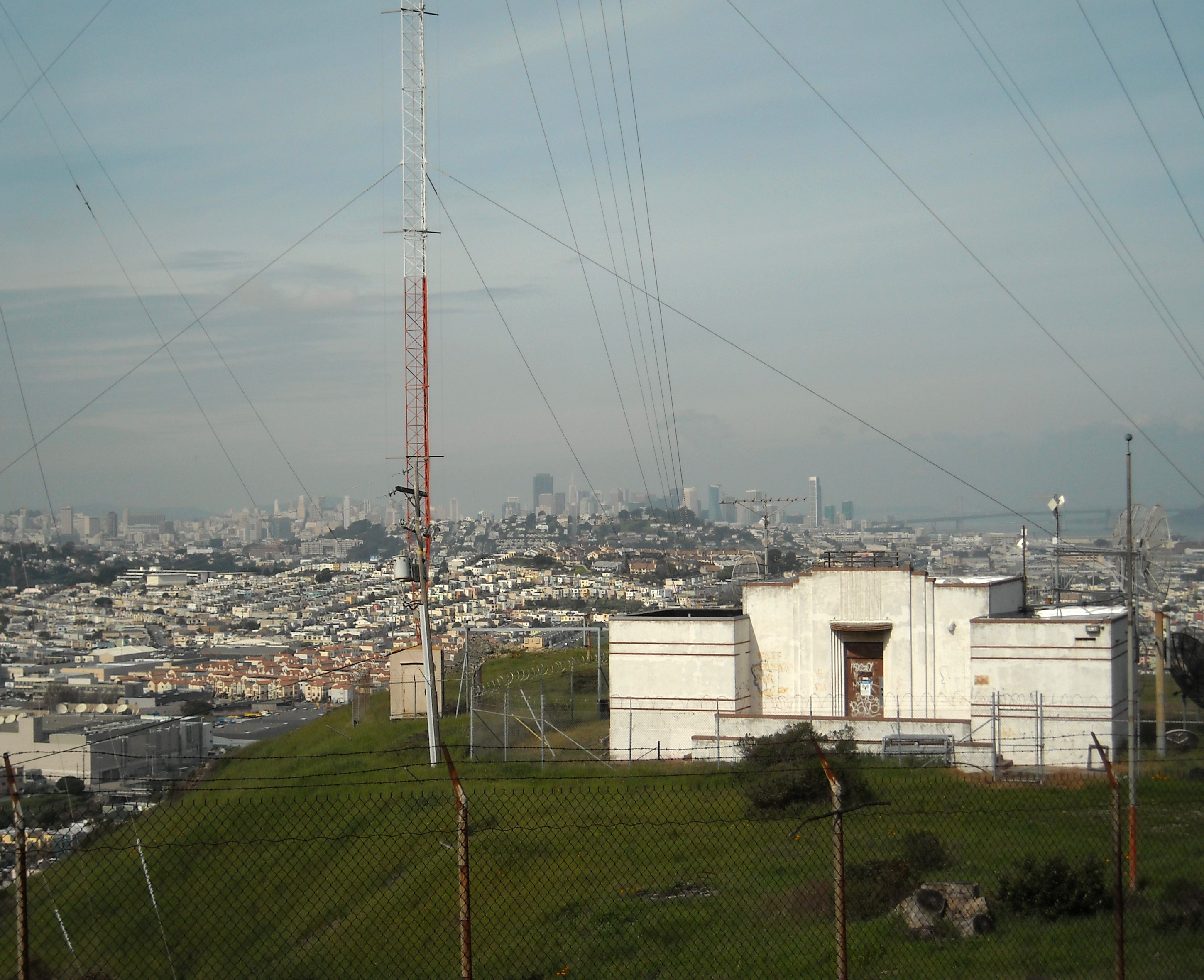
- The transmitter for KSFB
- San Francisco, California; United States
- Broadcast area: San Francisco Bay Area
- Frequency: 1260 kHz

Programming
- Format: Catholic radio
- Network: Relevant Radio

Ownership
- Owner: Relevant Radio, Inc.

History
- First air date: December 18, 1926
- Former call signs: KYA (1926–1983); KOIT (1983–1985); KXLR (1985–1986); KOIT (1986–2007)
- Former frequencies: 970 kHz (1926–1927); 850 kHz (1927–1928); 1230 kHz (1928–1941)
- Call sign meaning: "San Francisco Bay"

Technical information
- Licensing authority: FCC
- Facility ID: 6369
- Class: B
- Power: 5,000 watts (day); 1,000 watts n(ight)
- Transmitter coordinates: 37°42′59″N 122°23′38″W; 37°42′58″N 122°23′38″W auxiliary (backup)
- Translator: see below

Links
- Public license information: Public file; LMS
- Webcast: Listen live
- Website: relevantradio.com

KSFB (1260 AM) is a radio station licensed to San Francisco, California. It broadcasts Relevant Radio, a Roman Catholic radio format, to the San Francisco Bay Area of the United States. It was previously known as KYA until 1983, and KOIT and KXLR after that.

The AM station was a simulcast of the former sister station KOIT-FM, and unlike that station, continued to be owned by Bonneville International until February 1, 2008, when it was officially sold to IHR Educational Broadcasting.

== History ==
=== KYA ===
The station originated as KYA in 1926, and has had 14 owners and 4 different callsigns in 85 years. KYA was owned by everyone from Hearst Corporation to Avco Broadcasting of California, a subsidiary of the jet and aerospace contractor.

KYA went on the air on December 18, 1926, with 500 watts on 970 kHz. from the Clift Hotel in San Francisco. The owners were Vincent I. Kraft of Seattle, who had started KJR there, and Frederick C. Clift of San Francisco. It got a license for 1,000 watts on 850 kHz. in November 1927. Its studios moved to the Warfield Theatre building at 988 Market Street, but the transmitter stayed at the Clift Hotel.

In November 1928, Johnny Patrick and Helen Troy, developed a musical comedy routine of “Cecil and Sally”, first broadcast in 1928 on KYA, and debuted The Funniest Things on a West Coast connection of a short-lived ABC network, later, after the ABC network went bankrupt, in 1929, it moved to KPO and the NBC Pacific Coast Network. In 1930, Patrick and Troy syndicated their programs to other radio stations by electrical transcription records, made at the MacGregor and Sollie recording studio in San Francisco, with the program heard on over 53 radio stations, including 27 states, 5 Canadian provinces, the Hawaiian Islands, Australia and New Zealand, between 1930 and 1933.

In November 1928, KYA moved to 1230 kHz. as part of a nationwide frequency reshuffling, and joined the Columbia Broadcasting System. By May 1929 its transmitter was reported to be at 680 Geary Street at Taylor Street. The station licensee went bankrupt in August, and KYA was transferred to a new corporation by the end of 1929. The transmitter facility was moved again, on 25 June 1930, to the Whitcomb Hotel. Having moved to various locations around the radio dial during the chaotic early days of broadcasting, KYA was assigned permanently to 1260 kHz. as a result of the North American Regional Broadcasting Agreement (NARBA) in 1941.

=== "The Boss of the Bay" - KYA as a Top 40 Rock Station ===
In the mid-1950s, KYA made its mark as a rock and roll station. KYA was for many years the leading Top 40 music radio station in the Bay Area, until the stronger-signalled KFRC switched to the format in 1966. From time to time, up through 1970, KYA would again beat KFRC in the Arbitron ratings, but KYA's dominance was truly over after the mid-1960s. Former KYA morning man and legendary radio programmer Bill Drake went on to consult KFRC to its ratings success; it was at KYA that Drake first made his mark as program director. KYA was also instrumental in the careers of future sportscaster Johnny Holliday, audio and electronics store pitchman Tom Campbell, Hall of Fame disc jockey and underground radio pioneer Tom Donahue (a.k.a. "Big Daddy"), and Tommy Saunders, who retired from KYA's successor, KOIT, in 2006.

Other notable disc jockeys who plied their trade on KYA's airwaves in the 1960s included Les Crane, (air name Johnny Raven), Casey Kasem, Jim Stagg, Bobby Mitchell, Norman Davis, "Emperor" Gene Nelson, Peter Tripp, Tony Bigg, Russ "The Moose" Syracuse, Chris Edwards, Ed Hider, Johnny Holliday, Bill Holley (a cousin of Buddy Holly), Bwana Johnny, and Gary Shaffer. The 1970s saw a staff that included Christopher Cain, Roger W. Morgan, Jay Stone, Scott Thomas, Steve Jordan, Jimmy "Jet" Powers, Jeff Serr, Gary Mora, and Michael Rivers.

In the mid-1960s, a group of KYA DJs, led by Holliday, formed a basketball team known as the KYA Oneders (pronounced "Wonders"). The team played many Bay Area high school faculties, helping the schools raise funds for a variety of programs. Perhaps the most famous of the Oneders was Rick Barry, who played for the team during the 1967-68 campaign before jumping from the NBA's San Francisco Warriors to the ABA's Oakland Oaks.

During the 1960s, the radio station issued weekly tabloid newsletters and hit sheets, The KYA Swingin' Sixty and later the KYA Beat (also known as The Official Top 30). These popular flyers were available at Bay Area record stores and other sponsor locations. The station's under-promoted news team included Mark Adams(Don Allen), Terry Sullivan, Larry Buller, (air name of Larry Brownell), Tony Tremayne (air name of Mel Fritze) and Brad Messer, who would later be inducted in the Texas Radio Hall of Fame.

A KYA jingle can be heard at the beginning of the movie Zodiac. A commercial for a now-defunct local San Francisco Bay Area retailer, Gensler-Lee Diamonds, can be heard preceding the jingle. "Gensler-Lee Diamond; Gensler-Lee Diamonds; the place to buy diamonds if you're really smart; Gensler-Lee Diamonds... the store... with a heart!"

=== Easy Rock 93 and oldies ===
In September 1979, KYA and KYA-FM flipped to a light album rock format under the title "Easy Rock 93". Within months the AM station would flip again, this time to an oldies format while the FM station would continue the light album rock format as KLHT (K-LITE). Morgan, Mora, Serr and Syracuse would be brought back to revive the station from its heyday. This format would hold until the station was sold in 1983.

KYA's dominance was basically over by the late 1960s when FM stations began playing rock & roll and gained large chunks of the audiences. King Broadcasting took over on November 1, 1977.

=== KOIT and KXLR ===
KYA, which became KOIT in 1983 under the ownership of Bonneville International, still transmits from the station's classic Julia Morgan-designed transmitter building on Candlestick Point, with studios at 2nd and Howard in San Francisco. Morgan was on retainer for Hearst, and the building has the trademark Hearst eagle above the front door.

=== Catholic radio ===
In mid-2007, Bonneville reached an agreement to sell the 1260 AM frequency to IHR Educational Broadcasting. IHR took over the station's operations in December of that year under a time-brokerage agreement, and officially closed on the station on February 1, 2008. KYA's chief Top 40 rival in the 1960s and 1970s, KFRC (610 AM), is now the Christian-oriented KEAR.

On December 10, 2007, a religious format came to 1260 AM; the call sign was changed to KSFB. KSFB was part of Immaculate Heart Radio, one of the largest Catholic radio networks in America, and its daily broadcasts included daily Mass and rosary. Many other programs, such as Life Is Worth Living with Bishop Fulton J. Sheen, Fr. John Corapi, and Mother Angelica, were also on the air.

KSFB flipped to the Relevant Radio branding when IHR Educational Broadcasting and Starboard Media Foundation consummated their merger on July 3, 2017.

== Translators ==
In addition to the main station, KSFB is relayed by these translators.

Call sign	Frequency	City of license	FID	ERP (W)	Class	FCC info
K269FB	101.7 FM	San Francisco, California	147348	240	D	LMS
K285FA	104.9 FM	Walnut Creek, California	18542	99	D	LMS

== See also ==
- 93.3 KRZZ, which began as co-owned KYA-FM and simulcast AM 1260 during several periods
- 96.5 KOIT-FM, which was co-owned from 1983, was the source of AM 1260's KOIT call sign, and simulcast AM 1260 for a time
- KYA "The Boss of the Bay" which was a streaming web broadcast brought to you by Gary Mora and Super Harlow accessible via web radio that operated from 2008 until July, 2020
- List of works by Julia Morgan, which includes a number of other Hearst commissions
