= Niles Downtown Historic District =

Historic district in Michigan, United States

- U.S. National Register of Historic Places
- U.S. Historic district
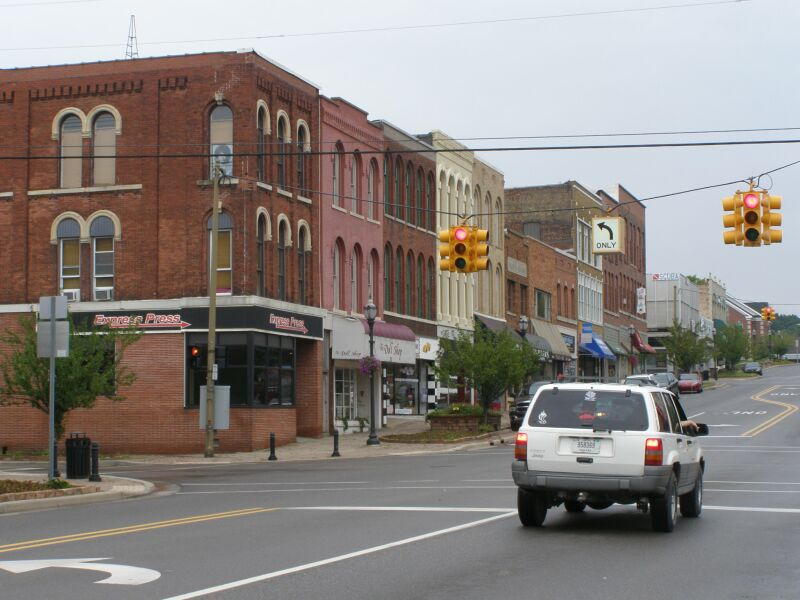
- 200 and 300 block of Main Street

- Location within Michigan Location within the United States
- Interactive map
- Location: Sycamore, Main and Cedar bet. Front and 5th, Niles, Michigan
- Coordinates: 41°49′47″N 86°15′22″W
- Area: 12 acres (4.9 ha)
- Built: 1884
- Architect: Myrle E. Smith, et al.
- Architectural style: Italianate, Classical Revival
- NRHP reference No.: 07000568
- Added to NRHP: June 21, 2007

The Niles Downtown Historic District is a commercial historic district located in Niles, Michigan along Sycamore, Main and Cedar Streets between Front and 5th. The districts was listed on the National Register of Historic Places in 2007.

== History ==
This location served as the commercial center of Niles since the 1820s, when the area was ceded by the Odawa to the United States. A few settlers soon arrived, and in 1828 Obed P. Lacey and Samuel B. Walling opened the first store at this location. The first portion of Niles was platted the following year, including the downtown area. The Chicago Road between Detroit and Chicago was completed through the area in 1832–33, and its location only a few miles south of Niles served to bring settlers into the area. By 1835, Niles had several hundred residents and a village government was established; by 1840, the population was 1200. The earliest buildings in Niles were of log construction, but these soon gave way to frame buildings. These buildings were subsequently replaced, and the only surviving early frame building from the downtown area is the 1843 Paine Bank, which was originally located at the corner of Main and Third, but was later moved outside the district.

Railroad service to Niles began in 1850, causing a surge in population and commerce in the village. The village became a city in 1859, and by 1860 the population was over 2700. In the commercial district, solid rows of buildings extended along Main from the river nearly to Third Street, with more buildings along Front and Second near Main. Brick buildings in the 100 and 200 block of Main, constructed before 1860, still stand in the district. Niles grew only slowly through the 1870s, 80s, and 90s, and the extent of the commercial section in 1895 was little larger than it was in 1870. Only in the late 1890s did new development extend all the way to Third.

Although a new Carnegie library and post office were constructed in the first decade of the 20th, century, almost no commercial buildings were constructed until after World War I. During the 1920s, a number of old buildings were replaced, and nearly every other older building underwent a storefront modernization. At the same time, the commercial district in Niles expanded, with newer buildings farther up Main Street. However, the Great Depression intervened, and almost nothing was done in the area until after World War II. Beginning in the late 1940s, a number of new buildings were constructed, and other storefronts were modernized with aluminum and porcelain enamel metal finishes.

However, by the 1950s, new business development was taking place on the outskirts of the city, and the city turned to an urban renewal agenda for the downtown. A number of plans were proposed, and eventually, in 1971, a section along Front Street was razed to make way for a new shopping center. After some false starts, the center was built in 1984. However, by this time, the newly established Downtown Development Authority was advocating for renovation, and by the 2000s, facade renovations projects were underway in the district, resulting in a stretch of historically appropriate facades along Main Street.

== Description ==
The Niles Downtown Historic District extends along a four-block section of Main Street, and generally includes the first block of the side streets to either side of Main. The district contains 86 buildings. The buildings are predominantly two- and three-story commercial structures, with some one- and four-story buildings. Seven buildings at the edges of the district were built as private houses; most of these have been converted to commercial purposes. Buildings date from the 1850s to the 1960s, in styles ranging from Greek Revival and Italianate to 1950s and 60s modern. The oldest buildings in the district, dating from the 1850s and early 1860s, are of brick construction and are located along Main between Front and Third as well as on adjacent portions of Front and Second.

== Gallery ==
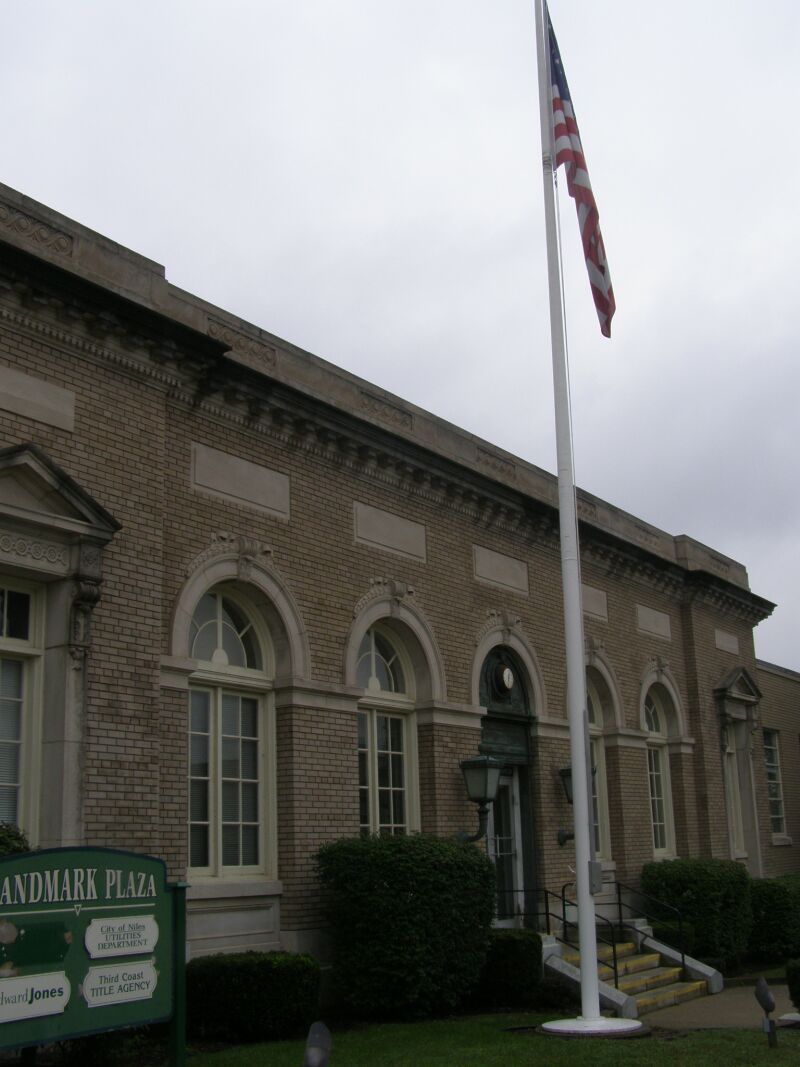
Niles Post Office (322 E Main)

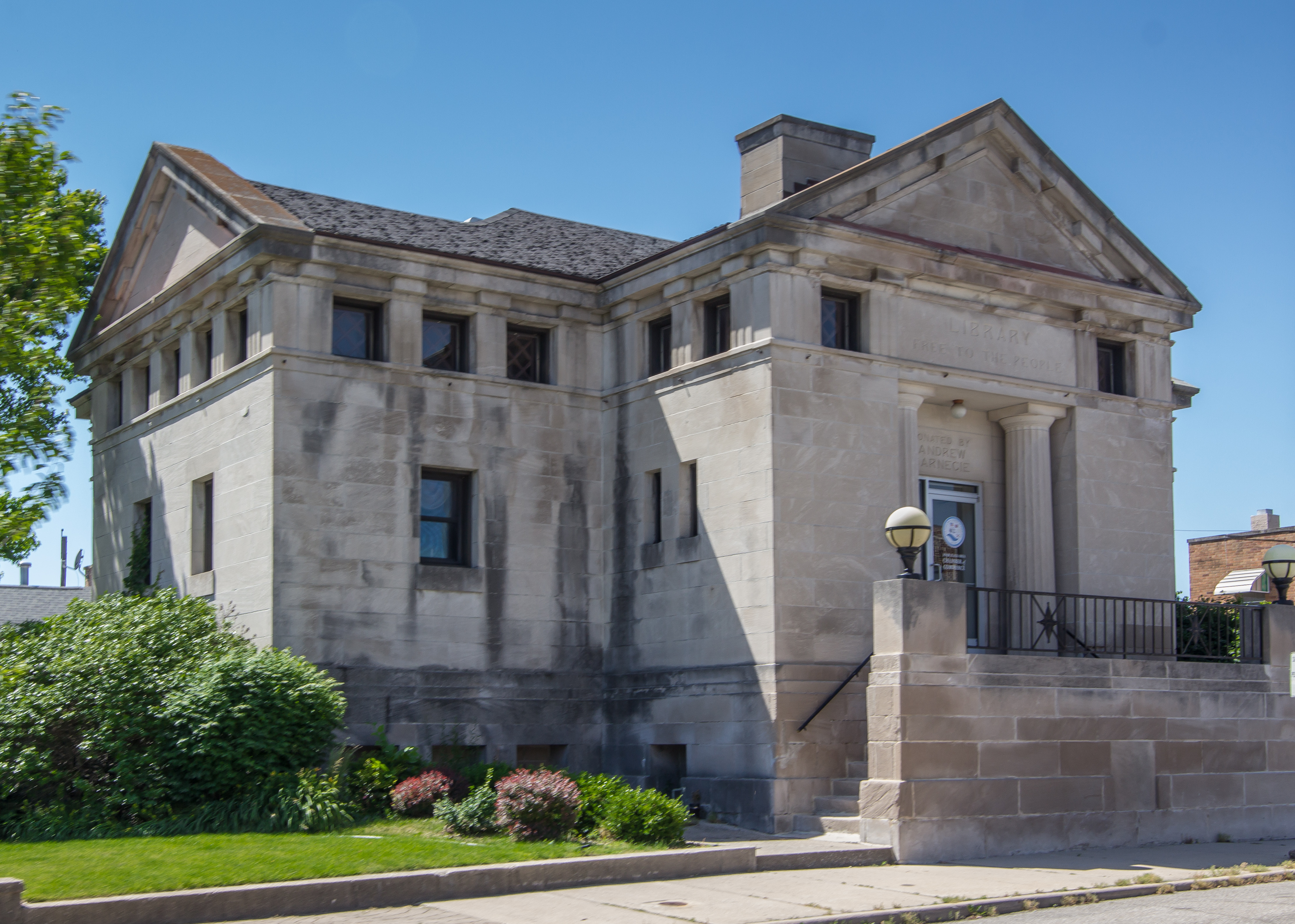
Carnegie Library (321 E. Main)

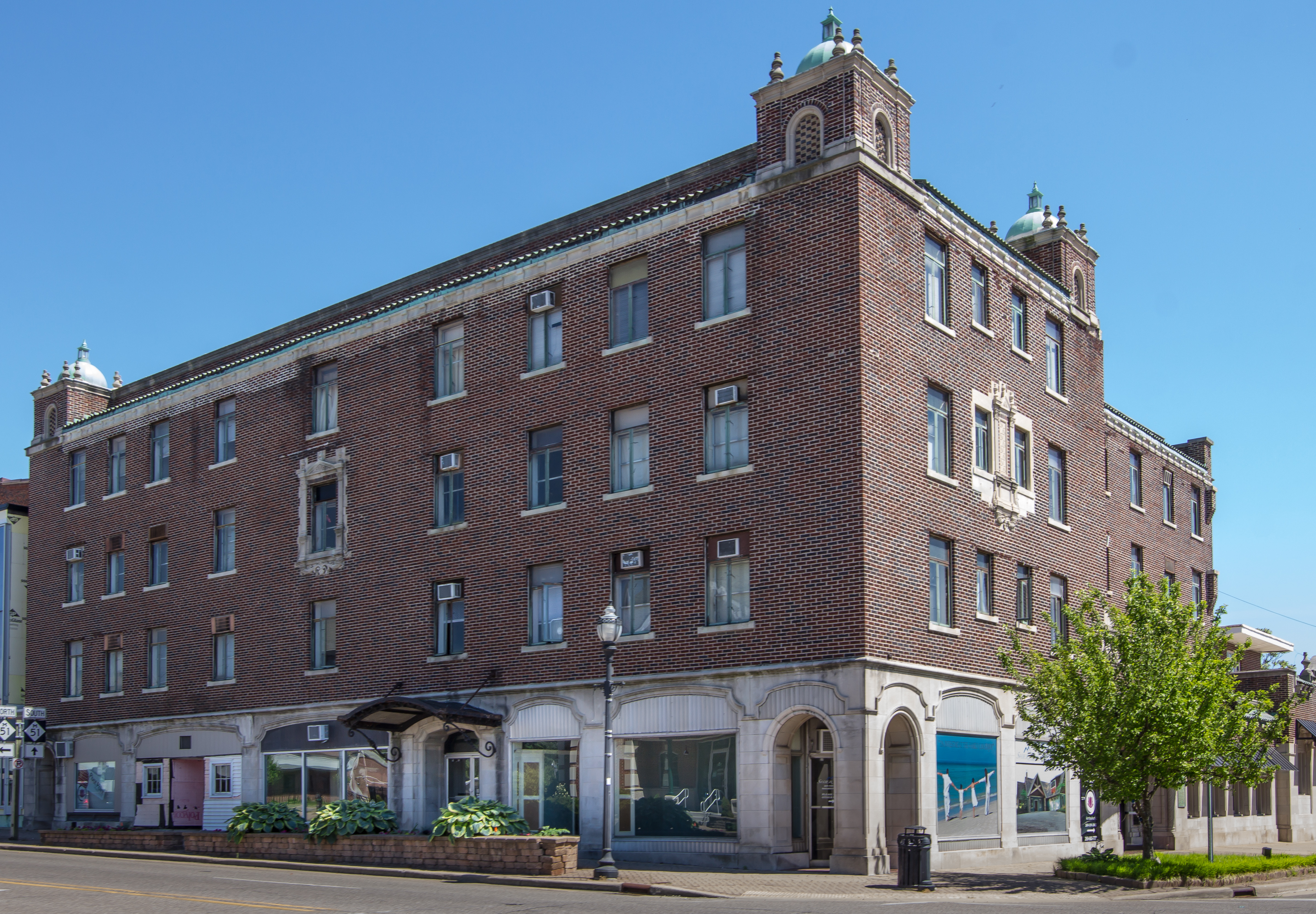
Four Flags Hotel (404-06 E. Main)
