= Peter Tripp =

American radio personality

- Born: June 11, 1926; Port Chester, New York, U.S.
- Died: January 31, 2000 (aged 73); Northridge, California, U.S.
- Known for: Going 201 hours without sleeping
- Children: 4

Peter Tripp (June 11, 1926 – January 31, 2000) was a Top 40 countdown radio personality from the mid-1950s, whose career peaked with his 1959 record-breaking 201-hour wakeathon (working on the radio non-stop without sleep to benefit the March of Dimes). For much of the stunt, he sat in a glass booth in Times Square. After a few days, he began to hallucinate, and for the last 66 hours, the observing scientists and doctors gave him drugs to help him stay awake. He was broadcasting for WMGM in New York City at the time. Tripp suffered psychologically. After the stunt, he began to think he was an imposter of himself and kept that thought for some time.

His career soon suffered a massive downturn when he was involved in the payola scandal of 1960. Like several other disc jockeys (including Alan Freed), he had been playing particular records in return for gifts from record companies. Indicted only weeks after his stunt, it emerged that he had accepted $36,050 in bribes. Despite his claim that he "never took a dime from anyone", he was found guilty on a charge of commercial bribery, receiving a $500 fine and a six-month suspended sentence. Even his wakeathon record did not endure for long. Other DJs had quickly attempted to beat it (such publicity stunts being common in radio broadcasting at the time) and Dave Hunter, in Jacksonville, Florida, soon claimed success (225 hours). Six years after Tripp's record, it was smashed by high school student Randy Gardner, who lasted 11 days.

After leaving WMGM, Tripp was unable to re-establish himself in the world of radio, drifting from KYA in San Francisco to KGFJ in Los Angeles and finally WOHO in Toledo, Ohio, before quitting the medium in 1967. Returning to L.A., he had more success working in physical fitness sales and marketing. He diversified into freelance motivational speaking, writing and stockbrokering before settling into a Palm Springs, California retirement.

Overall, he had spent twenty years in broadcasting: he began with WEXL in Royal Oak, Michigan in 1947, then on to Kansas City, Missouri in 1953 where he worked for KUDL (where he adopted the nickname "The Bald Kid In The Third Row", apparently a description made by a parent upon spotting him among many rows of new-borns in a hospital shortly after his birth), and then WHB (restyling himself as "The Curly-headed Kid In The Third Row"; he was not, in reality, bald) where he pioneered the Top 40 format. It was in 1955 that he landed his ill-fated job with WMGM in New York City, presenting "Your Hits of the Week".

Tripp died at the age of 73 following a stroke, leaving two sons and two daughters. His four marriages all ended in divorce.

T. C. Boyle's short story "The Kind Assassin", in Tooth and Claw (2005), is inspired by Tripp's "Wake-A-Thon".
