= Robert Hellenga =

American author (1941–2020)

- Born: August 5, 1941; Milwaukee, Wisconsin, U.S.
- Died: July 18, 2020 (aged 78); Galesburg, Illinois, U.S.
- Education: University of Michigan; Queen’s University of Belfast; University of North Carolina; Princeton University (PhD)
- Occupation: Author

Robert Hellenga (August 5, 1941 – July 18, 2020) was an American novelist, essayist, and short story author.

His eight novels included The Sixteen Pleasures, The Fall of a Sparrow, Blues Lessons, Philosophy Made Simple, The Italian Lover, Snakewoman of Little Egypt, The Confessions of Frances Godwin and Love, Death, & Rare Books. In addition to these works, he wrote a novella, Six Weeks in Verona, along with a collection of short stories in The Truth About Death and Other Stories. Hellenga also published scholarly essays and literary or travel essays in various venues, including The National Geographic Traveler, The New York Times Sophisticated Traveler, and The Gettysburg Review.

Hellenga was born in Milwaukee, Wisconsin and grew up in Milwaukee and Three Oaks, Michigan. He did his undergraduate work at the University of Michigan and his graduate work at the Queen’s University of Belfast, the University of North Carolina, and Princeton University. He received his Ph.D. from Princeton and began teaching English literature at Knox College in Galesburg, Illinois, in 1968. In 1973–74 he was co-director of the ACM Seminar in the Humanities at the Newberry Library in Chicago, and in 1982–83 he directed the ACM Florence programs in Florence, Italy. He also worked and studied in Bologna, Verona, and Rome. He was distinguished writer in residence and professor emeritus at Knox College. Hellenga was married and had three daughters.

Hellenga received awards for his fiction from the Illinois Arts Council and from the National Endowment for the Arts. The Sixteen Pleasures received The Society of Midland Authors Award for Fiction published in 1994. The Fall of a Sparrow was included in the Los Angeles Times list of the "Best Fiction of 1998" and the Publishers Weekly list of the "Best 98 Books." Snakewoman of Little Egypt, was included in The Washington Post's list of "The Best Novels of 2010" and Kirkus Reviews' list of "2010 Best Fiction: The Top 25." The audio version of Snakewoman was a 2011 Audie Award Winner for Literary Fiction. The Confessions of Frances Godwin received The Society of Midland Authors' Award for fiction published in 2014.

Hellenga died of neuroendocrine cancer on July 18, 2020, at his home in Galesburg, Illinois.
