= Carlos T. Mock =

American novelist (born 1956)

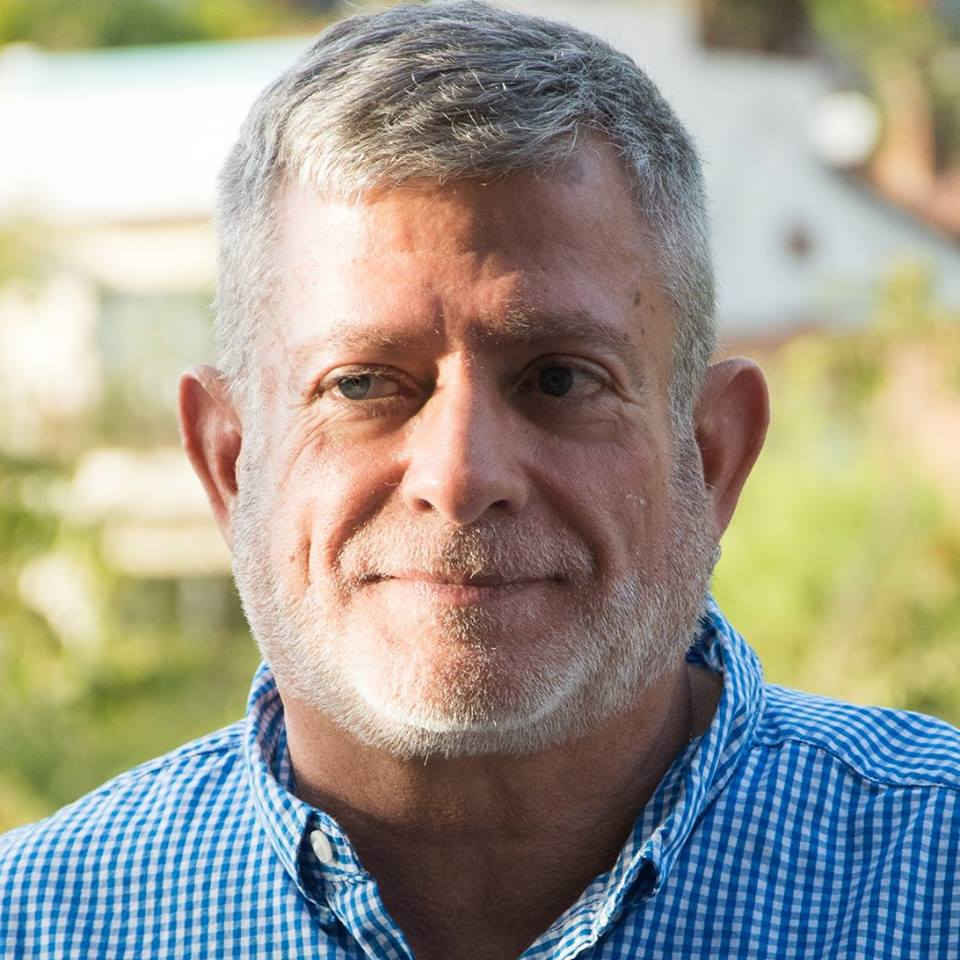
- Born: January 16, 1956 (age 70); San Juan, Puerto Rico
- Education: Johns Hopkins University (BA); University of Puerto Rico School of Medicine (MD)
- Occupations: Physician Ob/Gyn, activist, novelist, poet
- Partner: Bill Rattan
- Writing career
- Language: English, Spanish, French
- Website: www.CarlosTMock.com

Carlos T. Mock (born January 16, 1956) is a Puerto Rican physician, gay activist, journalist, and writer who has published both works in the medical profession, works of fiction, non-fiction, and poetry.

== Life ==
Mock was born in San Juan, Puerto Rico. He left Puerto Rico upon graduating from high school and attended Johns Hopkins University in Baltimore, Maryland, where he graduated cum laude in 1976 with a BA with a double major in chemistry and Spanish literature. He then attended The University of Puerto Rico School of Medicine in San Juan, where he obtained an MD in 1980.

He then did a flexible internship at the United States Public Health Service Hospital in New Orleans, Louisiana, and then did a four-year residency in obstetrics and gynecology at Cook County Hospital in Chicago, Illinois, graduating in 1985.

Mock then joined a private place group at the Glen Ellyn Clinic, where he practiced obstetrics and gynecology until 1996. He developed an interest in infertility and twin pregnancies which led to the publication of a medical paper in the later topic.

He is a Life Fellow of the American Congress of Obstetricians and Gynecologists and a Life Member of the American Medical Association.

Due to complications from HIV therapy, he became disabled in May 1996. He currently lives in Chicago, Illinois and Three Oaks, Michigan with his partner, Bill Rattan.

== Activism ==
While at practice in the Glen Ellyn Clinic, Mock experienced first-hand the discrimination in the workforce against GLBT physicians when one of his colleagues was fired for being gay. This, along with his HIV diagnosis, which forced him to retire, caused him to join the board of Equality Illinois, where he founded the Capitol Club., the fundraising arm of the organization, where he served from 2000 until 2009. His fundraising efforts were instrumental in the passage of the Human Rights Act of Illinois in 2005, prohibiting discrimination based upon sexual orientation and gender identity in Illinois. For his work he was inducted into the Chicago Gay and Lesbian Hall of Fame in 2007

== Literary career ==
Mock started writing in 2001. He was first published in 2003 when Floricanto Press published Borrowing Time, A Latino Sexual Odyssey, which was later released in paperback in 2006. This was followed by five other publications. Since then he has contributed to The Chicago Tribune, Windy City Times, Ambiente Magazine (in Miami, Florida) and the web magazines: The Billerico Project and OpEd News.

== Publications ==
=== Articles ===
- Twin Reversed Arterial Perfusion Syndrome, acephalic presentating at full term, Robert Roger Lebel, MD, Carlos Mock, MD, Jeannette Israel, MD, William Senica, MD, Fetus Magazine.
- Mock Views: The Death of a Great Pope
- The New Faces of Puerto Rican Lesbian Activism
- Puerto Ricans must address America's race and class divide
- With these words, let us wed
- Puerto Rican Sodomy Law – An Irony of Gay History
- We are not equal – the abused second class Americans
- Study Links Gay Marriage Bans to Rise in HIV Rate
- In the embrace of her family
- The American Solution for Puerto Rico

=== Books ===
==== Fiction ====
- Borrowing Time: A Latino Sexual Odyssey – Floricanto Press 2003. Paperback in 2006.
- Mosaic Virus – Floricanto Press 2007.
- Papi Chulo: A Legend, a Novel, and the Puerto Rican Identity – Floricanto Press 2008.
- The Corner Queen—La Loca de la Esquina: A Romance and a Revolution — Floricanto Press 2018.

==== Non-fiction ====
- Cuba Libe: "Mentirita" Cuba's history from the Afro Cuban point of view. – Floricanto Press October 2009.

==== Poetry ====
- Unfinished Works Published by AIDS Services Foundation – Orange County December 2005. "The Critic" Honorable Mention
- The Refined Savage Poetry Review – Refined Savage Editions Issue 1, March 2006 Editor/Publisher Jose Alejandro Peña
- Fingernails Across the Chalkboard Gwendolyn Brooks Center December 2006 Honorable Mention "Winter"
- MARIPOSAS: A Modern Anthology of Queer Latino Poetry Edited by Emanuel Xavier. Published by Floricanto Press, October 12, 2008
- Infinitas – Floricanto Press December 2011.

==== Short stories ====
- Van Gogh's Ear – The Supernatural Edition Anthology edited by Felice Picano. Page 72: Santería 101: How to Conceive a Boy
- Historias – Floricanto Press June 2014. Nominated for The 2015 Pulitzer Prize in fiction; Nominated for a 2015 International Latino Book Award in General Fiction, Nominated in 2015 for the Lammy award in Fiction from The Lambda Literary Foundation

==== Essays ====
- El Jardín de los Senderos que se Bifurcan by Jorge Luís Borges B. A. in Latin American Literature Thesis, Johns Hopkins University 1976.
- Unfinished Works Published by AIDS Services Foundation – Orange County December 2005. "HIV From the Puerto Rican Perspective" – Third Place award
- "Queer History viewed through the eyes of Literature and my favorite books as I live my Latino Odyssey" Testimonial Texts, Stories, Lives and Memories Published by Universidad Pedagógica Nacional (UPN), Mexico City May, 2006
