= Apple Cider Century =

Cycling route in Michigan, United States

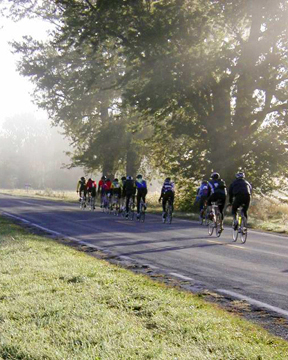
Participants in the bicycle ride

Apple Cider Century is a bicycle ride of 15, 25, 37, 50, 62, 75 or 100 miles around Three Oaks, Michigan, in the USA .

It was started by the Three Oaks Spokes Bicycle Club in 1974 with just 220 riders. More than 7,000 riders take part annually. It has been called one of the best rides in the country and is held on the last Sunday of every September.
