= Sandburg House =

- U.S. National Register of Historic Places
- Lake Michigan side

- Location within Michigan Location within the United States
- Interactive map
- Location: Poet's Path, Harbert, Michigan
- Coordinates: 41°53′0″N 86°37′50″W
- Area: less than one acre
- Built: 1928
- Architect: Lilian Sandburg
- Architectural style: Colonial Revival, Georgian Revival
- NRHP reference No.: 72001470
- Added to NRHP: April 14, 1972

The Sandburg House is a private home located on Lake Michigan near Harbert, Michigan. It was listed on the National Register of Historic Places in 1972.

== History ==
In 1926, poet Carl Sandburg published the first volume of his biography of Abraham Lincoln entitled Abraham Lincoln: The Prairie Years. Exhausted from this and other writings, Sandburg and his family left Chicago for the summer to vacation in a cottage overlooking Lake Michigan near Harbert. Charmed by the location, the family stayed in Harbert through the fall. A few years later, they built this house along the shore of the lake. The house was designed by Lilian Sandburg, Carl's wife.

The Sandburgs lived in this house year-round for nearly two decades. Carl Sandburg continued to write, and it was here that he wrote the second volume of his Lincoln biography, Abraham Lincoln: The War Years, which won the 1940 Pulitzer Prize in history. At one point, Sandburg's daughter Helga asked if she could keep a cow. Rather than a cow, the Sandburgs purchased goats, and Lilian Sandburg Lilian began a career of goat breeding, and started what she called the "Chikaming Goat Farm." In 1940, Lilian Sandburg won both the "Grand Champion Nubian Golden Cup" and the "Grand Champion Toggenburg Silver Cup" for prize goats.

However, in 1945, the Sandburgs decided that the winters were too harsh, and moved to another house in North Carolina, which is now the Carl Sandburg Home National Historic Site. In 1947, they sold the house to Theodore Yntema, then a University of Chicago professor. It changed hands multiple times since then.

== Description ==
Land side

The Sandburg House is a multi-storied house designed by Lilian Sandburg with mixed Colonial Revival and Georgian Revival elements. It is located high on a steeply sloping bank overlooking the beach of Lake Michigan. The house rises three stories on the Lake Michigan side, and five stories on the land side, and contains multiple windows overlooking the lake. It had a widow's walk on the roof, which has since been removed, and a vault in the basement.
