= Zinc Collar Pad Company Building =

- U.S. National Register of Historic Places
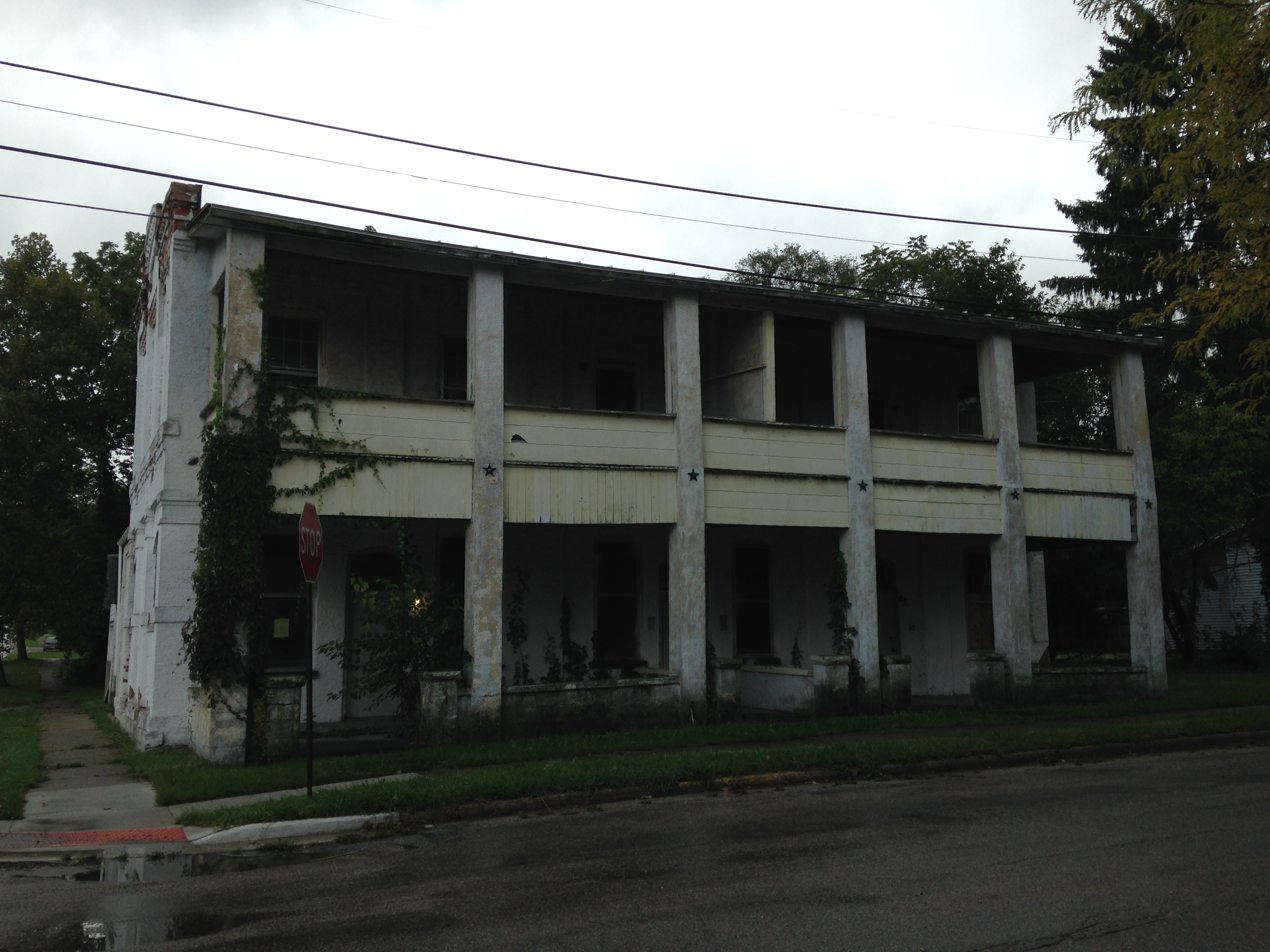
- 2014

- Location within Michigan Location within the United States
- Interactive map
- Location: 304 S. Oak St., Buchanan, Michigan
- Coordinates: 41°49′29″N 86°21′42″W
- Area: 0.3 acres (0.12 ha)
- Built: 1875
- Architectural style: Italianate
- NRHP reference No.: 09000472
- Added to NRHP: July 1, 2009

The Zinc Collar Pad Company Building is an industrial building located at 304 S. Oak Street in Buchanan, Michigan. It was listed on the National Register of Historic Places in 2009.

== History ==
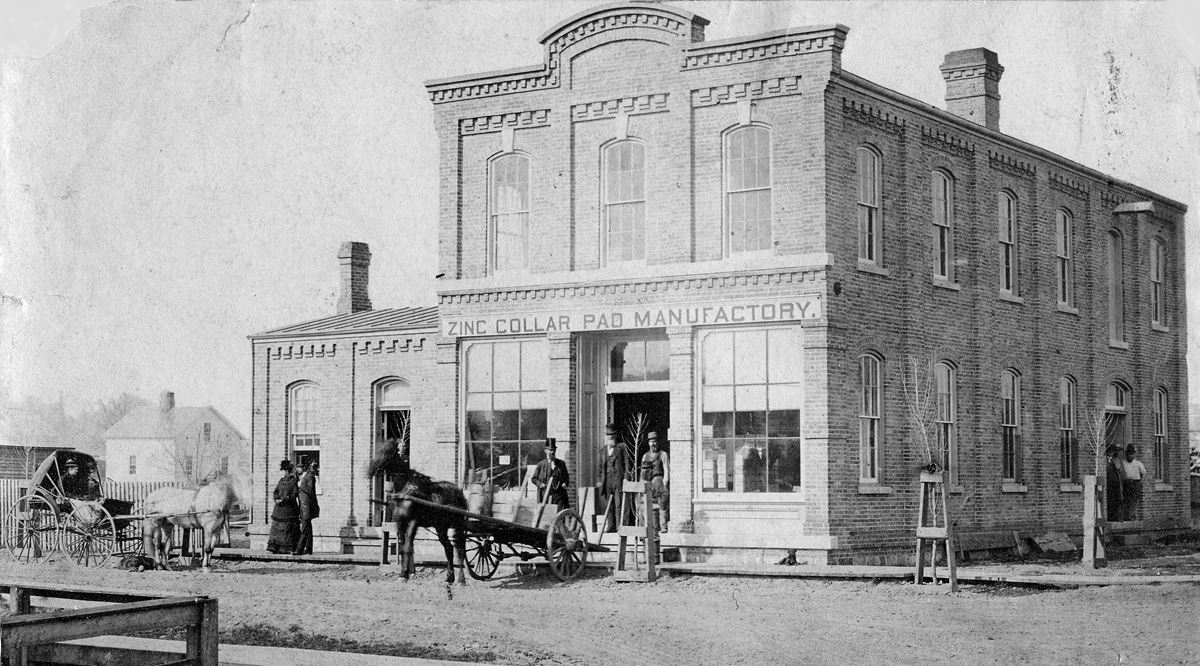
Zinc Collar Pad Co Building, c. 1890

In 1870, Dexter Curtis invented a unique Zinc lined collar pad for horse harnesses, which prevented chafing of the horse's neck and shoulders. That year, Curtis formed a partnership with George H. Richards and Henry Gilman to manufacture and market the pads under the name of ""Curtis, Gilman and Richards." The first pad was introduced in April 1870, and was an immediate success. The location of the company's original manufacturing facility is not recorded, but by 1871 what was now the "Zinc Collar Pad Company" was located in a space in a foundry on Red Bud Trail. The business continued to grow, and it was reported that in 1871-73, the company consumed over 400,000 of zinc. However, in September 1874 the building they were located in burned down.

The next month, the company responded by drawing up plans for this building, and in 1875 they constructed it in the heart of what was then Buchanan's booming industrial center. The company operated out of this building for many years; however, in about 1884 Dexter Curtis set up the Dexter Curtis Company in Madison, Wisconsin to manufacture more pads. George Richards and his son Joseph also founded firms making other products (carpet stretchers and bicycle seats) and operated them out of this building. George Richards died in 1888, passing his share of the company to his son. In 1898, Curtis and Richards split, and Joseph Richards became sole owner of the firm in Buchanan. Joseph Richards died in 1906, and the firm passed to his sons, and by 1913 the firm outgrew the building, moving to a larger one on Buchanan's Main Street. Production peaked in 1917-18 due to the demand for horse collars in World War I. However, after the war, business declined sharply, and the firm was defunct by 1927.

When the Zinc Collar Pad Company moved in 1913, the 1875 building was sold to a local partnership, Pears and Fuller. They converted the building into four apartments, adding large verandas to the south facade. It served as apartments for over 80 years, but in approximately 1998 became vacant.

== Description ==
The Zinc Collar Pad Company Building is a two-story red brick building which has been substantially covered with stucco. It measures approximately 26 feet by 55 feet, with a single story extension to the south, measuring 16 feet by 18 feet. Large porches extend from the north and south sides. When constructed, the east facade was the primary facade, but the entrance was filled in when the building was converted in to apartments in 1914 and the north side became the primary facade. This side has a large veranda sheltering the entrances to apartments.

== 2014 Gallery ==
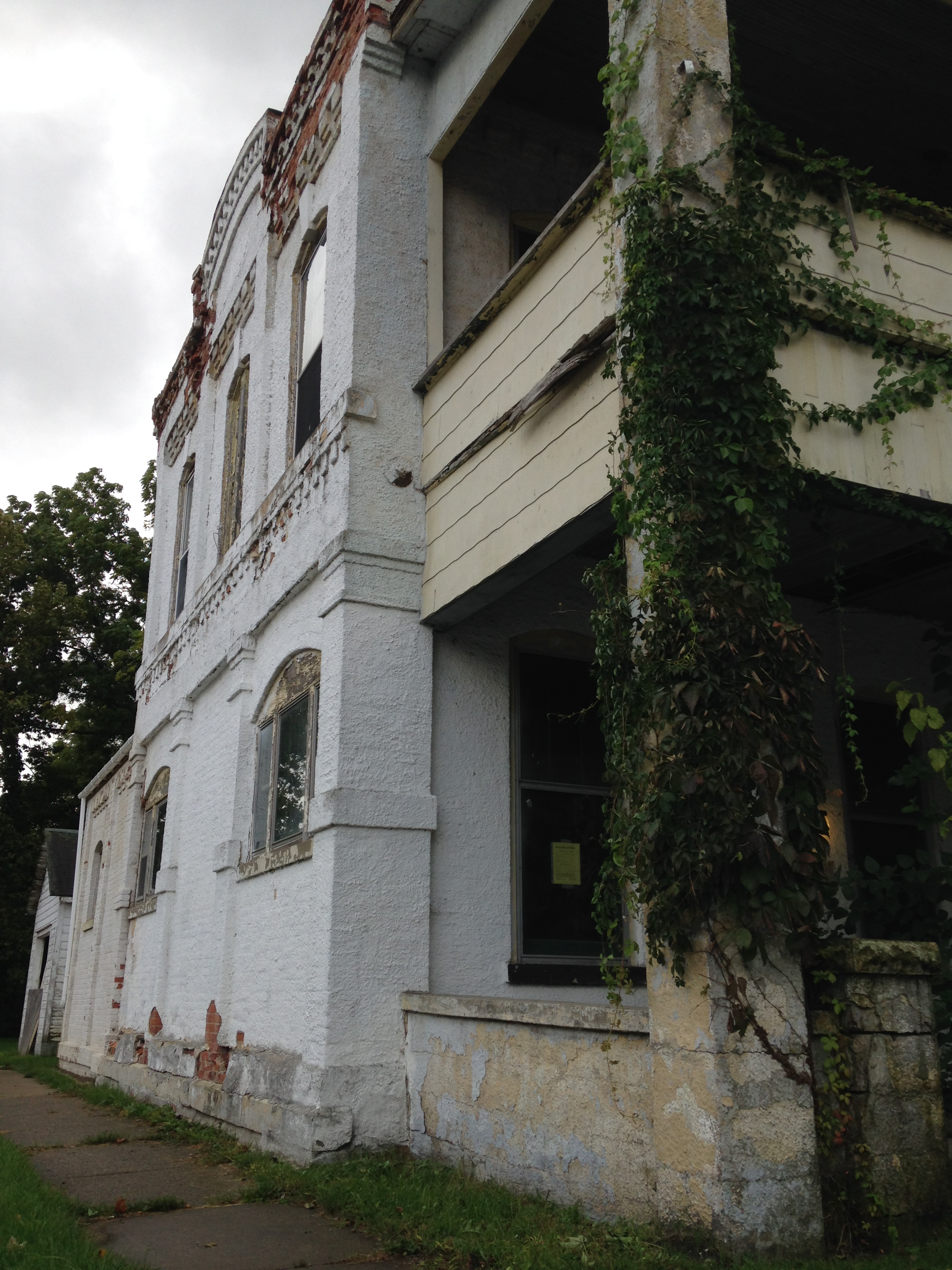

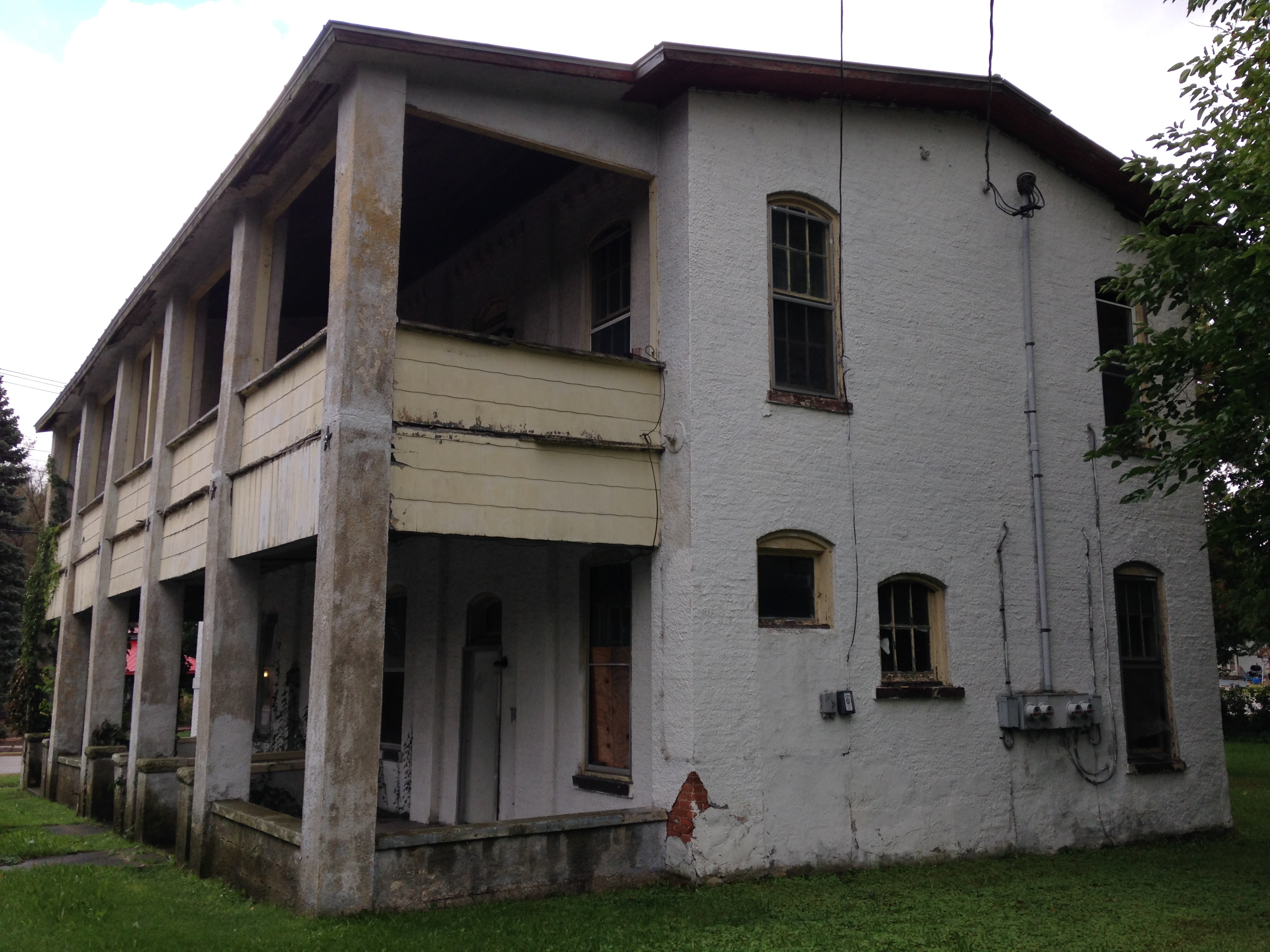

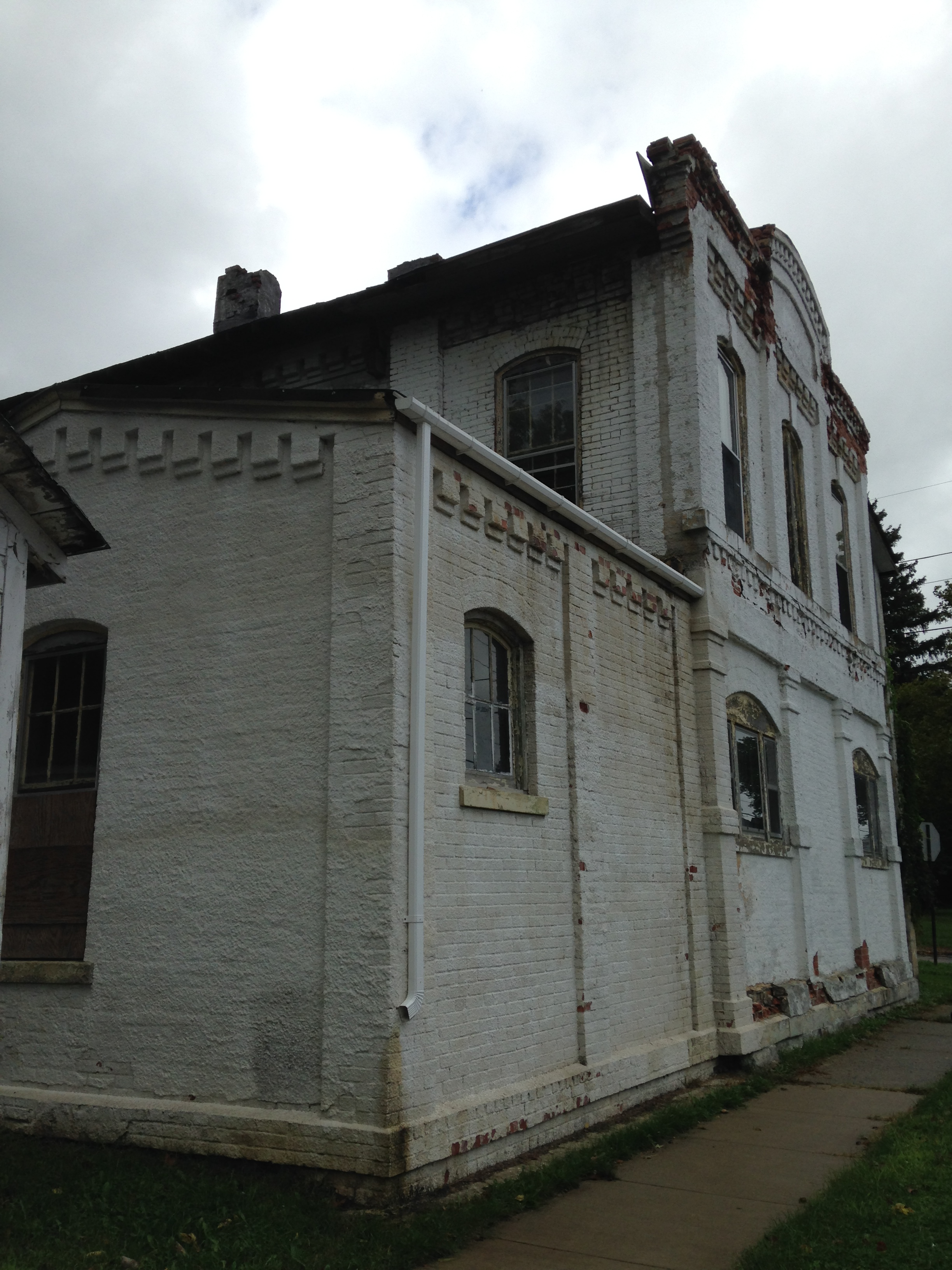
