= Ferry Street Historic District =

- U.S. National Register of Historic Places
- U.S. Historic district
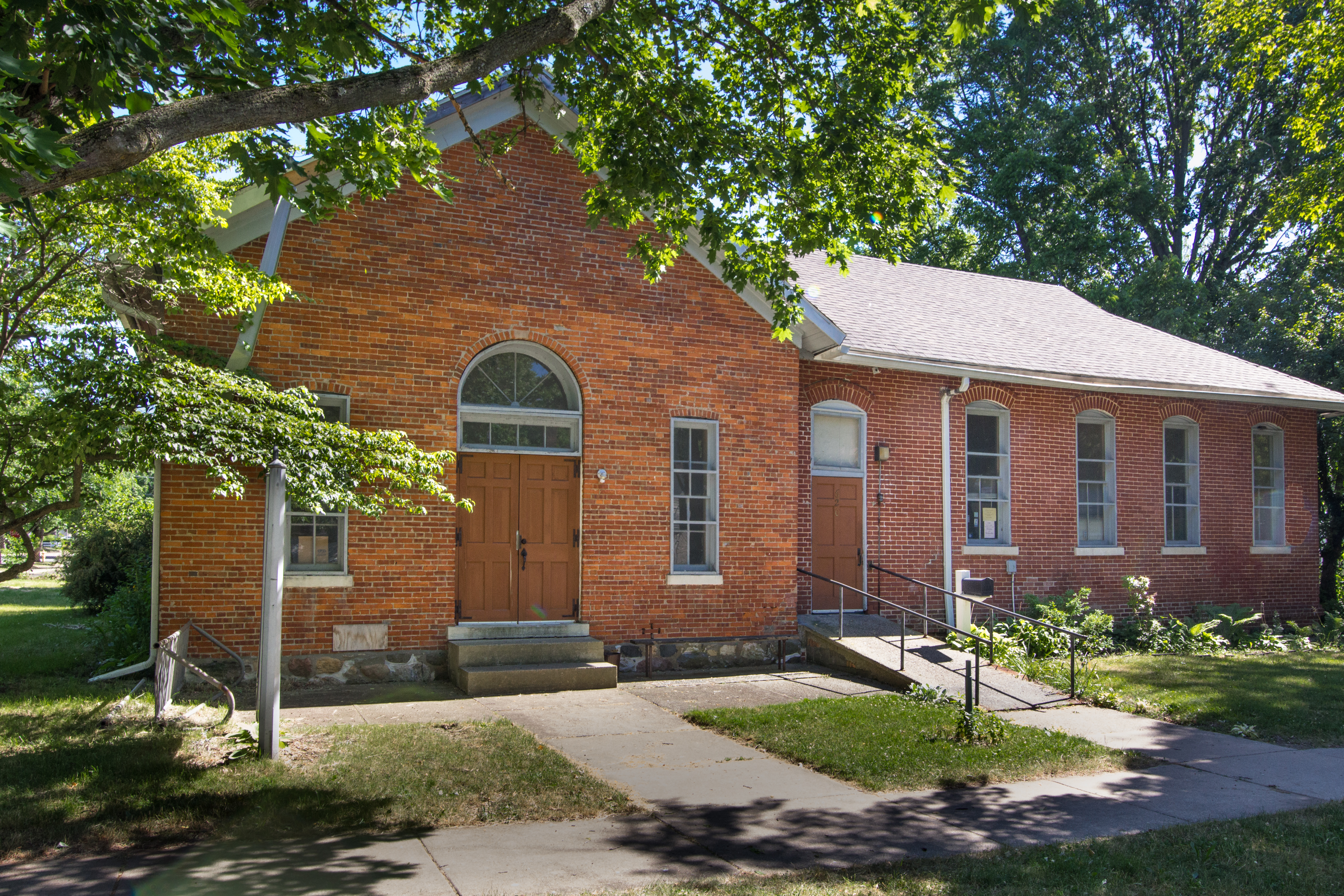
- Ferry Street Elementary School, 2017 (now demolished)
- Interactive map
- Location: 527-801 north side of Ferry Street; 514-814 south side of Ferry Street; 701-815 north side of Sycamore; 323 North 5th Street; 308-410 North Sixth Street; 307-402 North Seventh Street; 307-410 North Eighth Street; and 310 North Ninth Street; Niles, Michigan
- Coordinates: 41°49′54″N 86°15′5″W
- NRHP reference No.: 100011316
- Added to NRHP: January 15, 2025

The Ferry Street Historic District is a primarily residential historic district located in Niles, Michigan along Ferry Street (and adjacent streets) from Fifth to Ninth. The district was listed on the National Register of Historic Places in 2025.

== History ==
Niles was founded in the early 1920s. Abolitionist societies were organized in the 1830s, and Niles became one of the first stops along the Underground Railroad in Michigan. This section of the city along Ferry Street was platted in 1836, and in 1846 African-Americans began settling in the neighborhood. The district grew slowly, with six buildings constructed by 1860 and 24 by 1873.

In 1867, the Ferry Street School was constructed in the district. The school closed two years later when the Niles school system was integrated, but reopened in 1873 as an integrated school. It was used as a school until 1975, after which it was restored and used as a community resource center. The school was burned and subsequently demolished in 2023.

The neighborhood slowly grew from the 1860s through the 1920s, with a few buildings constructed every decade. The last residential building completed was constructed in the early 1940s, and the latest major addition to a building was in 1971 with the expansion of Mount Calvary Baptist Church.

== Description ==
The Ferry Street Historic District includes approximately 53 structures, 39 of which are historically significant, spread over four blocks of Ferry Street and two blocks of Sycamore Street. Most of this is residential housing, with houses located on lots of uniform size. The earliest structures still existing in the district date to approximately 1860.

The district also includes a Prince Hall Mason Lodge (the first such established in Michigan) and two church congregations: the Second Baptist Church (currently known as the Mount Calvary Baptist Church) and the Franklin AME Church. It also includes the former site of Ferry Street School.

Notable former residents of the district include artist and activist Lottie Wilson Jackson, Reverend John William Hackley, and activist and educator Isaac Burdine.
