= Ninth District Lighthouse Depot =

- U.S. National Register of Historic Places
- U.S. Historic district
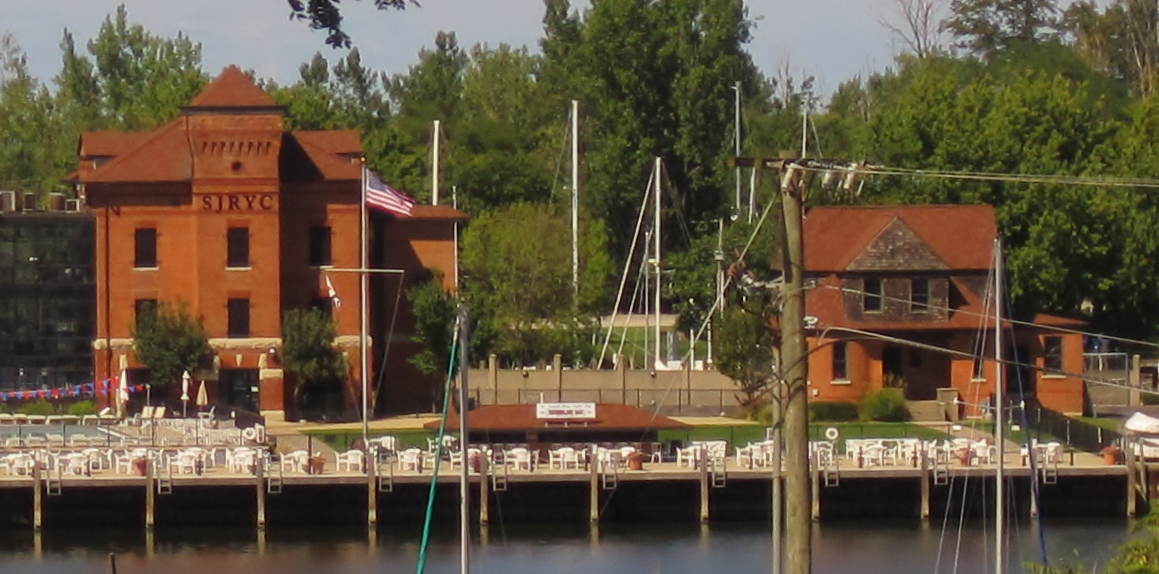

- Location within Michigan Location within the United States
- Interactive map
- Location: 128 N. Pier, St. Joseph, Michigan
- Coordinates: 42°06′50″N 86°29′05″W
- Area: 1.7 acres (0.69 ha)
- Built: 1891
- Built by: US Army Corps of Engineers
- Architect: Major William Ludlow
- Architectural style: Late Victorian
- NRHP reference No.: 93001348
- Added to NRHP: December 2, 1993

The Ninth District Lighthouse Depot is a collection of historic structures located at 1 Lighthouse Lane in St. Joseph, Michigan. It was listed on the National Register of Historic Places in 1993. It now houses the Saint Joseph River Yacht Club.

== History ==
The first two lighthouses constructed on Lake Michigan were built in 1832. By 1852, there were 27 lighthouses on Lake Michigan, and 76 on all of the Great Lakes. That year, Congress reorganized the Lighthouse Establishment into districts, with much of the Great Lakes falling into the eleventh district, headquartered in Detroit. In 1866, the Lighthouse Establishment was reorganized again, this time establishing a ninth district which covered Lake Michigan. At first, the ninth district at first shared the eleventh district supply depot, but the number of lights on Lake Michigan continued to grow, to 81 in 1890. Due to the number of lights covered by the ninth district, and to the difficulty of accessing the Detroit-based supply depot in the winter months, sharing a supply depot proved unsatisfactory.

In 1891, Congress appropriated $35,000 for the construction of a supply depot at St. Joseph's harbor. Plans for the depot were prepared by the ninth district engineer, Major William Ludlow of the US Army Corps of Engineers. Construction of the depot began in 1891, and work was eventually completed in early 1893 on the storehouse, keeper's house, and carpenter-lampist shop. A storehouse/shop building on the grounds was likely built in 1909/10. The depot was used for receiving, overhauling, and storing buoys and their appendages, and was charged with delivering supplies to the lighthouse keepers in the district.

However, the depot located in St. Joseph was deemed to be too far removed from Milwaukee, where the ninth district was headquartered. In 1904, additional money was appropriated to construct a second depot in Milwaukee. The St. Joseph depot remained the primary one for the district until 1916, when the Milwaukee depot was designated as the principal depot. The St. Joseph depot was closed in 1917, and in 1918 was transferred to the Navy for use as a naval station.

It is likely that the depot served as headquarters for the Michigan Naval Militia's Benton Harbor unit until 1927, when the Benton Harbor Naval Armory was constructed. The depot was transferred to the state of Michigan in 1936, and it continued to serve as a naval militia and naval reserve station until about 1950. In 1952, it was used to house army reserves, and starting in 1956, it was used to house a unit of the Michigan Army National Guard. In 1997, the buildings were refurbished to house the Lighthouse Depot Brewpub and Restaurant. The brewpub closed in 2001, and the building sold to the Saint Joseph River Yacht Club.

== Description ==
The Ninth District Lighthouse Depot contains four primary buildings: the keeper's dwelling, the storehouse, the carpenter and lampist shop (later converted to the assistant's dwelling), and the storehouse/shop.

=== Keeper's dwelling ===
The keeper's dwelling is a two-story, cross-gable-roof building with brick walls on the first story and a shingled second story.

=== Storehouse ===
The storehouse is a three-story brick structure with additional attic space within the hip roof. It measures 40 × 40 feet, plus centrally located projections, the front one of which is a tower. The building has square head entrances and limestone trim, including a second-story beltcourse. The tower has a hip-roof and corbelled brickwork below a frieze.

=== Carpenter and lampist shop ===
The carpenter/lampist shop is a single-story brick hip-roof building measuring 50 × 20 feet. It has arched door and window openings, and an enclosed hip-roof porch across the front.

=== Storehouse/shop ===
The storehouse/shop is a single-story brick hip-roof building measuring 62 × 26 feet.
