= Wendell P. and Harriet Rounds Robbins House =

- U.S. National Register of Historic Places
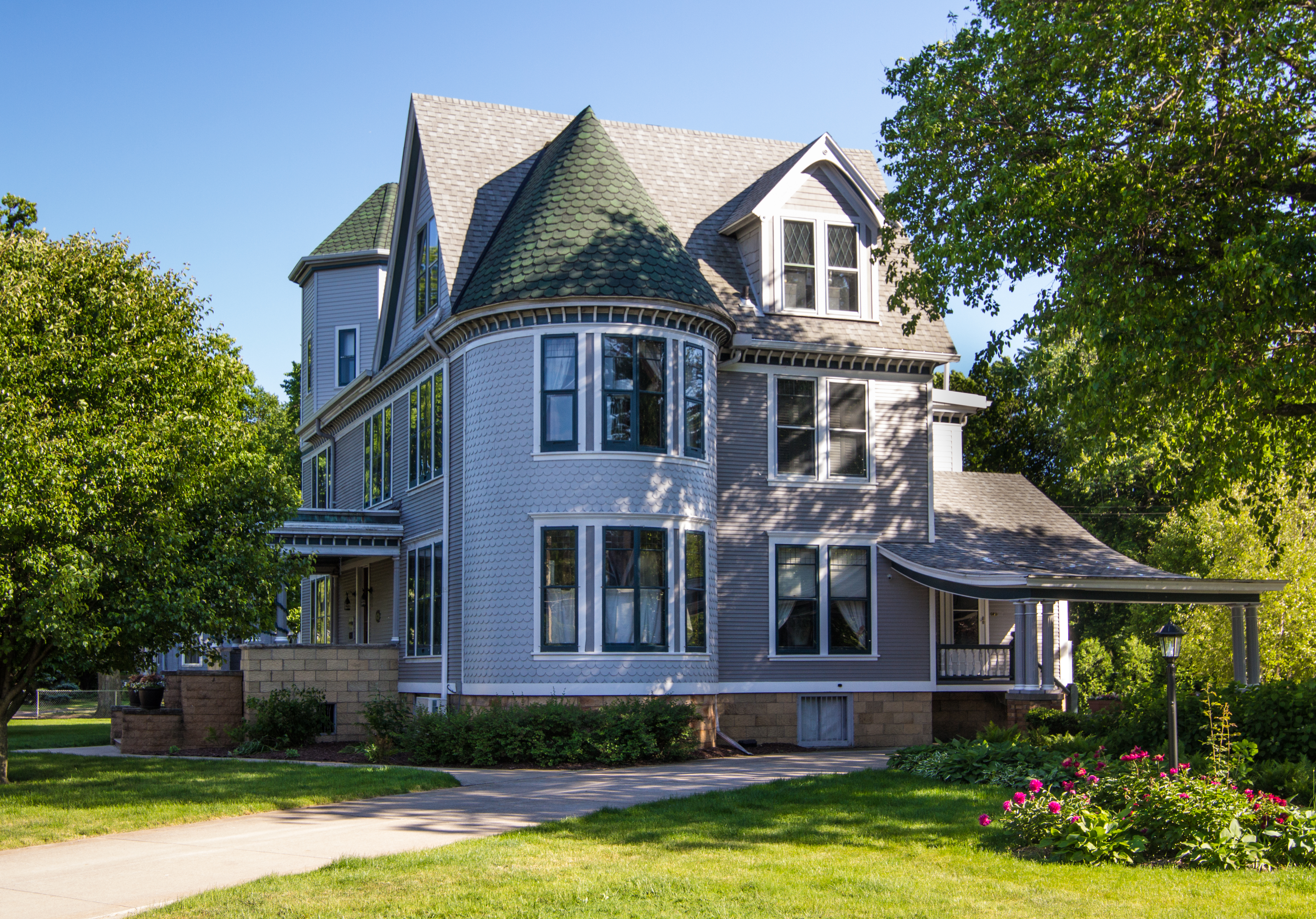

- Location within Michigan Location within the United States
- Interactive map
- Location: 680 Pipestone St., Benton Harbor, Michigan
- Coordinates: 42°6′17″N 86°26′38″W
- Area: 1.5 acres (0.61 ha)
- Built: 1897
- Architectural style: Queen Anne, Shingle Style
- NRHP reference No.: 07000385
- Added to NRHP: May 2, 2007

The Wendell P. and Harriet Rounds Robbins House is a private house located at 680 Pipestone Street in Benton Harbor, Michigan. It was listed on the National Register of Historic Places in 2007.

== History ==
Wendell Phillips Robbins was born in 1849 in Harwich, Massachusetts. He worked as a clerk in a dry goods store for two years; then moved to Benton Harbor in 1869, only three years after the village had been established. There, he worked for his older brother Nathaniel as a shipping clerk for a few years. In the early 1870s, Wendell purchased an interest in the Robbins & Eldredge lumber yard, which had been established by Nathaniel Robbins and a brother-in-law, Barzilla B. Eldredge. The firm was later reorganized as Eldredge & Robbins, but in 1894, Wendell Robbins assumed full ownership of the lumber yard.

In 1873, Wendell Robbins married Harriet Rounds. Harriet Rounds was born in Stoney Point, Jefferson County, New York in 1854, and had arrived in Benton Harbor in about 1866. The couple had this house constructed in 1897. Wendell Robbins continued in the lumber business and lived in this house until his retirement in 1920. He died the next year; Harriet Rounds Robbins died in 1924. The house stayed in the family until 1941, when the Robbins' daughter Grace died. It was restored in the 1990s.

== Description ==
The Robbins House is a two-and-one-half-story wooden Queen Anne/Shingle style building with a combination of hip and gable roofs. The exterior is covered primarily in clapboard, with shingling on the gable ends and portions of the front facade. The broad front facade is asymmetrical, with an octagonal tower at one end and a hip roof round-ended extension at the other. The entrance is in the center, sheltered with a single story veranda. A porte cochere is attached to the house near the extension. Fluted Tuscan columns support both the veranda and the porte cochere.

The interior contains extensive stained wood trim, with art glass or leaded glass transoms over the windows. The first floor contains an entry foyer that leads to a larger central foyer. The central foyer provides access to the upstairs, as well as a living room and den. The dining room, kitchen, and pantry are located behind the living room, and a library is located near the den. The second floor contains a master suite with office and bathroom, two additional bedrooms, a bath, and a play area. The third floor contains a family room, bar area, poker room, bathroom and storage rooms.
