= Oak Ridge Cemetery (Buchanan, Michigan) =

- U.S. National Register of Historic Places
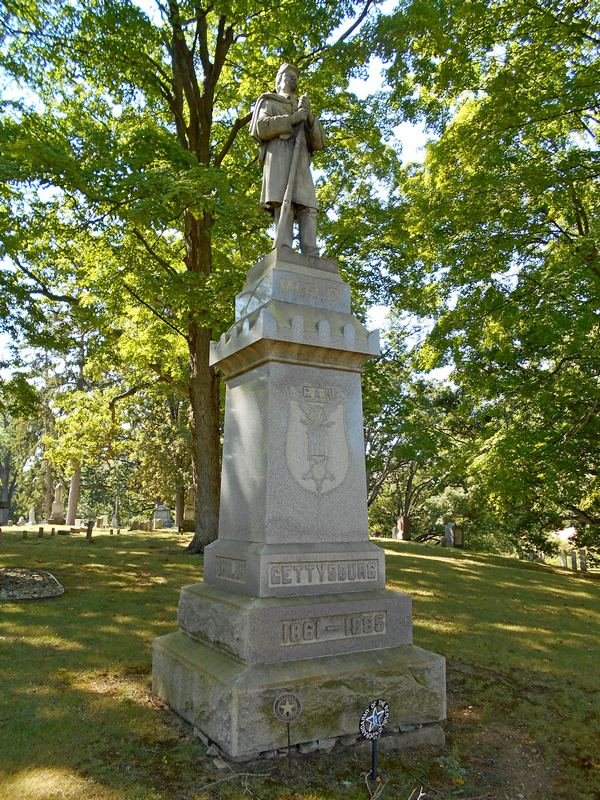
- Civil War Monument
- Interactive map
- Location: 818 Terre Coupe Rd. Buchanan, Michigan
- Coordinates: 41°49′30″N 86°22′45″W
- Built: 1868
- Architect: Rufus Rose, F. W. Keller, J. G. Barket, M. L. Jones
- Architectural style: Classical Revival, Gothic Revival
- NRHP reference No.: 100010296
- Added to NRHP: May 8, 2024

Oak Ridge Cemetery is a historic cemetery located at 818 Terre Coupe Road in Buchanan, Michigan. It was listed on the National Register of Historic Places in 2024.

== History ==
Buchanan was first platted in 1842, and a one-acre site was set aside for use as a burial ground. By 1862, concerns over the long-term adequacy of the cemetery had grown, and a committee was formed to recommend a longer-term solution. In 1864, the village purchased this ten-acre site to use for future burials. In 1866, Rufus Rose surveyed and laid out the landscaping the property, and in 1867 Lewis Hahn cleared and finished the cemetery grounds. The first lot in the new cemetery was sold in 1868. Additionally, some remains from the older cemetery and elsewhere were moved to the new Oak Ridge cemetery. Burials in the older cemetery ceased in 1881, and the grounds were vacated and the remaining burials moved in 1894.

In 1900, the village made a second purchase of land to expand the cemetery. IN 1922, a sexton's cottage was constructed, and a gateway installed in 1927.

== Description ==
Oak Ridge Cemetery consists of approximately 35 acres of ground, split between the original 1868 cemetery and the 1900 addition. The original 10-acre cemetery features a scenic ridge with oak trees and undulating mounds and curved drives. The plots are laid out to conform to the geometry of the landscape and the drives, so that the headstones form concentric rings which face the drive.

The 1900 cemetery is a 16-acre section which is lower and flatter than the original. The plots are laid out in a north–south orientation. A stone gateway at the end of this section opens onto Terre Coupe Street.
