= Drier's Meat Market =

- Union Meat Market
- U.S. National Register of Historic Places
- Michigan State Historic Site
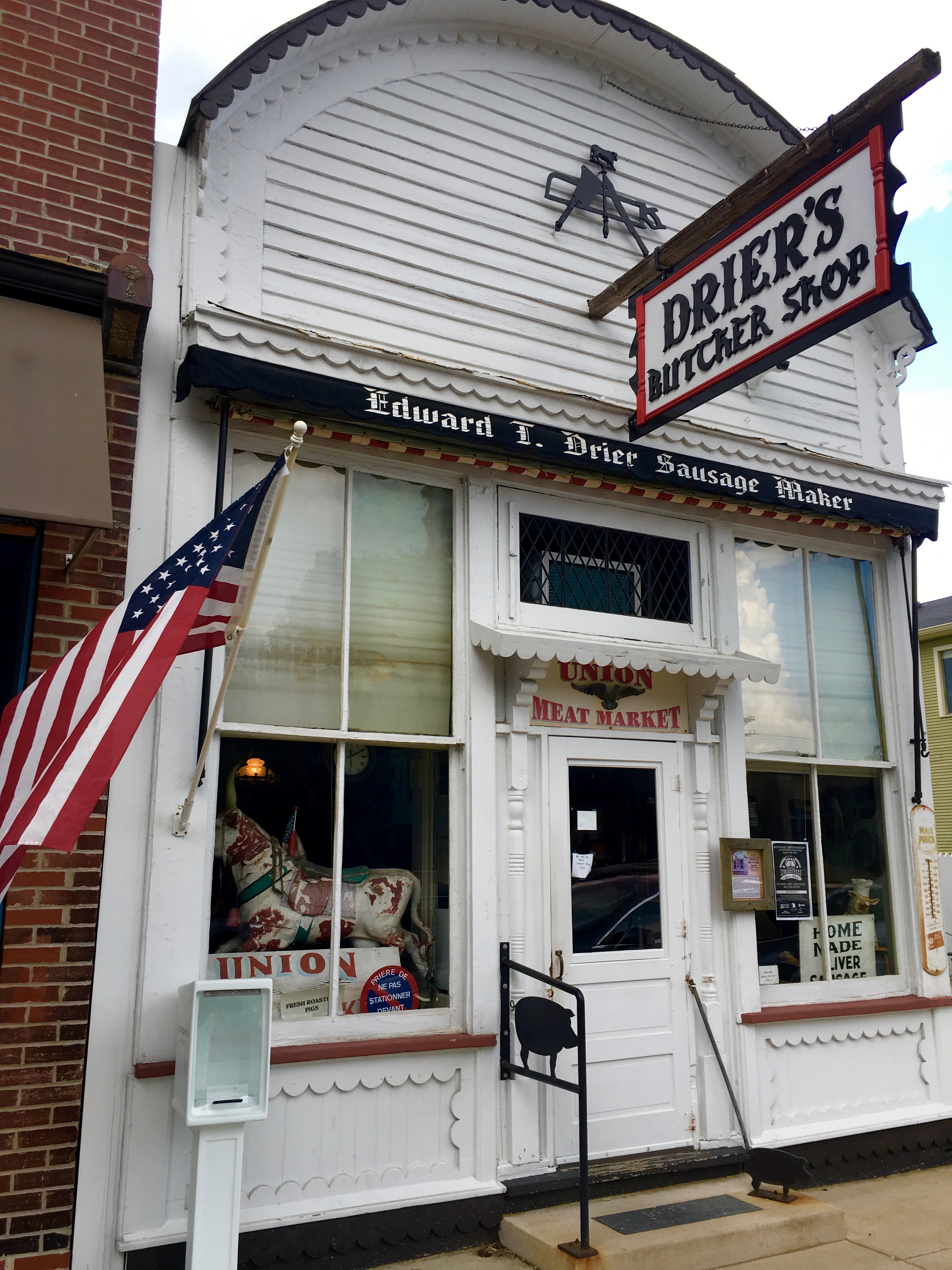

- Location within Michigan Location within the United States
- Interactive map
- Location: 14 S. Elm St., Three Oaks, Michigan
- Coordinates: 41°48′1″N 86°36′38″W
- Area: less than one acre
- Website: www.driers.com
- NRHP reference No.: 72000596
- Added to NRHP: September 22, 1972

Drier's Meat Market, also known as Drier's Butcher Shop or the Union Meat Market, is a commercial meat market located at 14 South Elm Street in Three Oaks, Michigan. The building has been in continuous use as a butcher shop since the late 19th century. It was listed on the National Register of Historic Places in 1972.

== History ==
Drier's Meat Market was originally constructed as a wagon repair shop. In about 1875 it was converted to a butcher shop by a butcher whose name is uncertain. In 1887, Alec Watson arrived in Three Oaks from Chicago and took over what was then known as the Union Meat Market.

Watson hired a 10-year-old boy, Edward T. Drier, as a delivery boy, and in 1913 sold Drier the business. Drier eventually passed it along to his son, Edward Drier Jr. In 1994, he passed it to his daughter Carolyn Drier.

== Description ==
Drier's Meat Market is a single-story commercial building with a gable roof and rounded false front. The front facade is decorated with scalloped wood trim. The interior has original wood floors and many fixtures dating to the 19th century.

== Customers ==
Over the years, Drier's has attracted a number of famous customers. These include poet Carl Sandburg (who lived nearby), meat mogul James Hormel and film critic Roger Ebert (both of whom vacationed in the area), Chicago Mayor Richard J. Daley, Bill Blass, Larry Hagman, and cartoonist Bill Mauldin.
