= Dewey Cannon =

Historic site

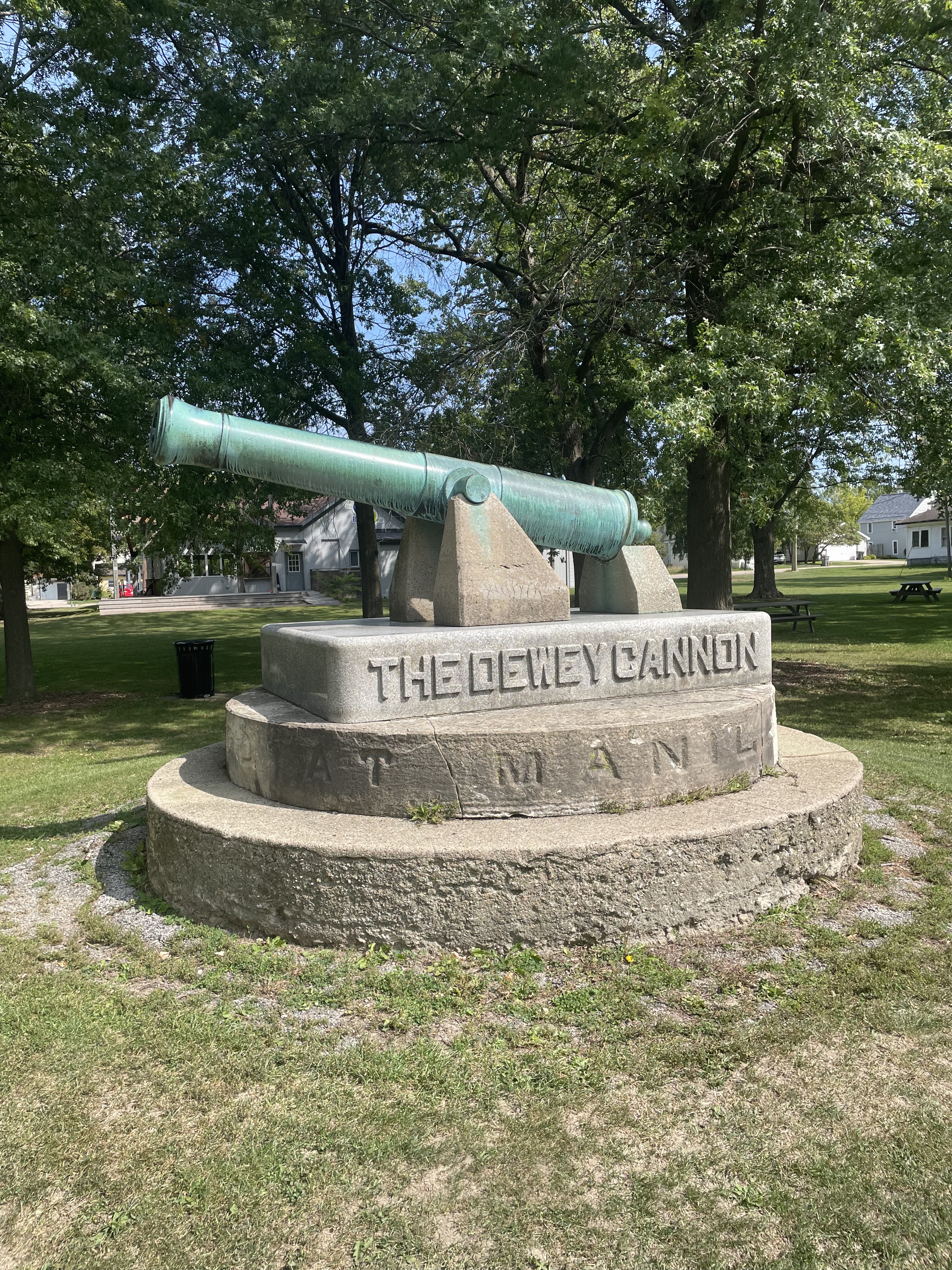
Dewey Cannon, Three Oaks, Michigan

The Dewey Cannon is an antique Spanish bronze cannon. Currently, it is a Michigan registered historic site located in Three Oaks in the U.S. state of Michigan. Originally emplaced on the island of Corregidor, the cannon was captured by the United States Navy in 1898 after the Battle of Manila Bay. The heavy gun was shipped to the United States as a prize of war and used as a competition trophy in a patriotic fundraising drive. After Three Oaks was declared the winner of the contest, the cannon was awarded to the people of Three Oaks. A park close to the center of the town, Dewey Cannon Park, has been landscaped to provide a setting for the massive trophy.

== Description ==
The Dewey Cannon is a public artifact of the Spanish–American War, fought in 1898. This four-month conflict between the United States and Spain, ignited by an explosion involving the armored cruiser USS Maine, ended in a complete victory for the United States. In May 1898, U.S. naval forces entered what was then the Spanish colonial harbor of Manila Bay and subdued its fortifications, including Corregidor Island. The Dewey Cannon was purloined, as a prize of war, soon after this change of possession. The bronze fieldpiece was being used as a defensive decoration for the home of the Spanish colonial governor. As a gun that was at least 30 years old (and obsolete) at the time of its capture, it was useless to Dewey's men. American military forces swiftly refortified Corregidor as part of their drive to make the Philippine Islands into an American colony.

=== Prize of war ===
The trophy cannon was renamed in honor of U.S. Commodore George Dewey, and was carried to the United States in November 1898. As a prize of war, it was displayed to curious crowds in the office of the San Francisco Examiner throughout the winter of 1898–1899. The bronze fieldpiece was then handed over to the National Monument Committee of New York, a philanthropic organization, for what was to be the focus of a national promotion and fundraising drive. The Maine explosion had killed or fatally injured 266 U.S. sailors, and authorities sought to develop a suitable memorial to the dead through a public-private partnership that would involve the active participation of both men and women. The federal government agreed to set aside a suitable space at Arlington National Cemetery to serve as a final resting place for many of the men, and the National Monument Committee set to work to raise funds to build what would become the USS Maine Mast Memorial. Three Oaks contributed $1,400, equivalent to $52,914 in 2024. The town was declared to have raised more money, per capita, than any other community in the U.S. The rural community also offered to set aside a square-block park space as a site for the artifact. Three Oaks was declared the winner of the nationwide competition, and President William McKinley visited the community on October 17, 1899 to dedicate Dewey Cannon Park.

Lead fundraiser Helen Miller Gould, daughter of railroad magnate Jay Gould, now took charge. The philanthropist had worked with her fellow New Yorkers on a variety of private-sector efforts to help American Spanish–American War wounded and dead. She oversaw the official presentation of the trophy to the people of Three Oaks on June 28, 1900.

=== Today ===
Today, the cannon continues to bear the royal monogram of Queen Isabella II of Spain (reigned 1833–1868). Next to the monogram, an incised inscription sets forth a brief history of the cannon's acquisition by U.S. forces. A nearby Michigan historical marker continues the story. The cannon is Michigan Registered Site #S0239.

The cannon, now mounted on a circular concrete base, is located in Dewey Cannon Park on Cherry Street in Three Oaks, Michigan. It is mounted so that its muzzle points westward, facing weekend visitors from nearby Chicago. Its coordinates are 41°48′05″N 86°36′33″W.
