= Whitcomb Hotel =

Hotel in Saint Joseph, Michigan, United States

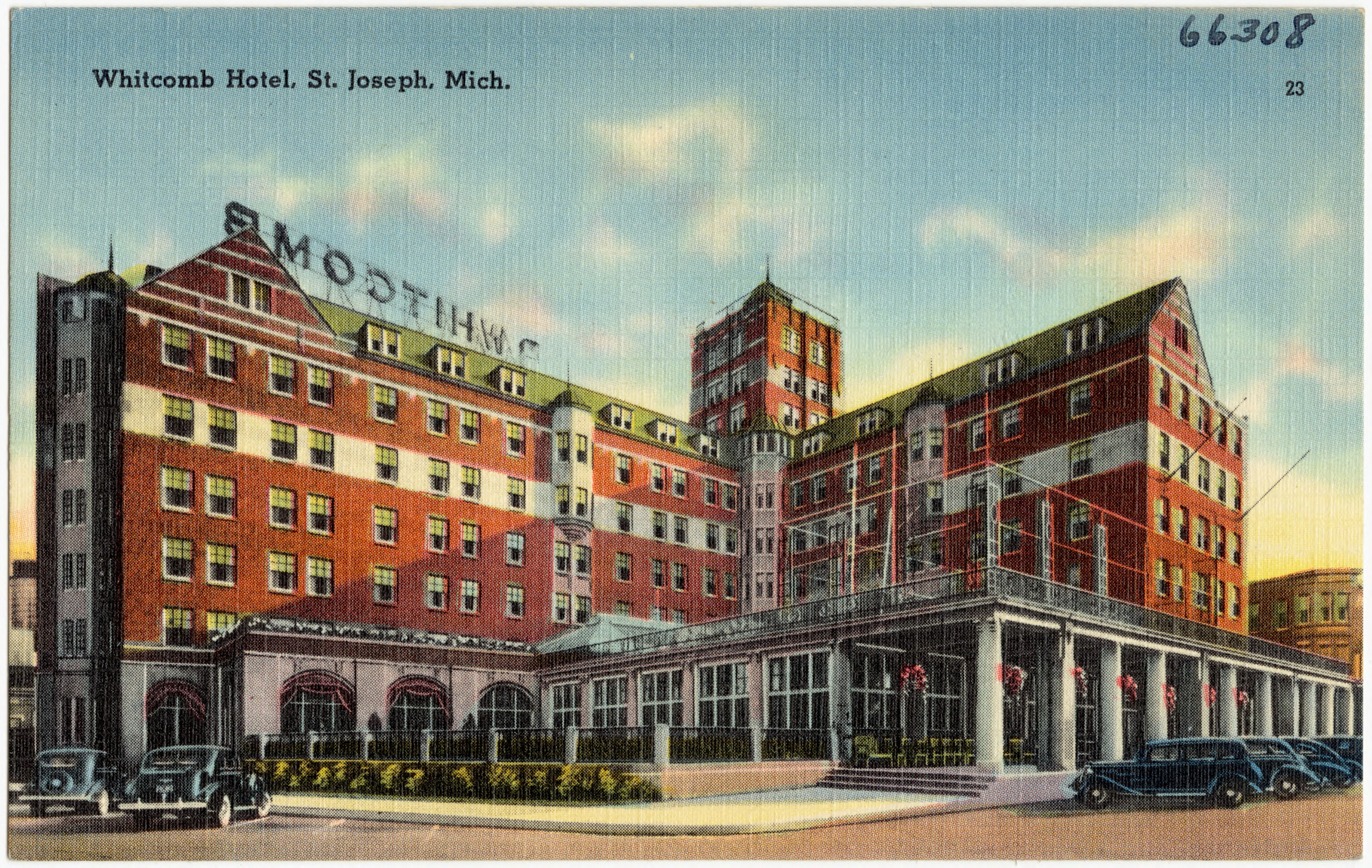
- Old postcard of the 1928 hotel Whitcomb Hotel

- Location within Michigan
- Interactive map

General information
- Location: Saint Joseph, Michigan
- Coordinates: 42°6′39″N 86°28′54″W
- Opening: May 3, 1928
- Owner: Private Investment Group

Technical details
- Floor count: 7
- Floor area: 115,000 square feet (10,683.8 m^{2})

Design and construction
- Architects: Pond, Pond, Martin and Lloyd

Other information
- Number of rooms: 134
- Number of restaurants: 1
- Parking: 40

Website
- www.whitcombretirement.com
- Whitcomb Hotel
- U.S. National Register of Historic Places
- Built: 1927
- NRHP reference No.: 100007206
- Added to NRHP: November 24, 2021

The Whitcomb Hotel, located in St. Joseph, Michigan, was a renowned hotel in the nineteenth and twentieth centuries known for its mineral spa and panoramic views of Lake Michigan and the St. Joseph River. It is now a four-star senior living community. The building was listed on the National Register of Historic Places in 2021.

== History ==
=== Mansion House ===
The Mansion House was the first hotel built at this site on top of the bluff in St. Joseph in 1831. Awed by the panoramic view, August Newell built a rough log cabin lodging house. The moniker "Mansion House" was supposedly intentional sarcasm, as it was not a mansion nor much of a house, but the views were spectacular. The Mansion House became a popular stagecoach stop between Chicago and Detroit. The building was torn down in 1866 and replaced by the St. Charles Hotel.

=== St. Charles Hotel ===
Charles Krieger tore down the Mansion House and built the St. Charles Hotel, which opened to the public in 1868. Upon construction, it was deemed "the biggest and most beautiful (hotel) in the area". The St. Charles and other new hotels in the area helped to cement St. Joseph as a tourist destination. The St. Charles Hotel changed hands several times over the years.

=== Hotel Whitcomb ===
In the 1880s, steamship traffic on Lake Michigan continued to grow, transporting both cargo and passengers. In 1889, the Detroit & Cleveland Steam Navigation Company (D&C) started to run two round-trips per day between Chicago and St. Joseph. This created new potential for tourism as Chicago residents escaped the city for relaxing views of the lake. An enterprising general agent for the D&C named C.D. Whitcomb purchased the St. Charles Hotel. It is unknown whether this was with his own money or with company funds. The hotel was refurbished and renamed the Hotel Whitcomb.

=== Mineral Baths ===
In 1905, the Hotel Whitcomb discovered it had more to offer than just great views. There had been Native American legends of foul-smelling gas rising from cracks in the ground near the hotel. Geologists confirmed there was an underground sulfur spring in the area and the Hotel Whitcomb began piping the water into its own mineral baths. This extra amenity attracted even more tourists from around the country. So much so that a "moving staircase" was constructed to take people up the bluff from the ferry landing. It cost a penny to ride it.

=== The New Whitcomb Hotel ===
By 1927, the original 1868 structure had begun to show its age. In just six weeks, several prominent merchants in the area raised $1 million to build a new hotel. Jane Addams, who vacationed in the area, recommended the Chicago-based Pond Brothers. Modeled after Mediterranean resorts, the neo-Tudor design was an L-shaped seven-story structure with a square tower at the corner, capped by a bell-cast copper cupola. The brick exterior has trim of white stone. The original hotel has 225 rooms, dining space for 800, a sunken garden and a 60 tub bathhouse. It opened on May 3, 1928 to much fanfare.

=== The Whitcomb ===
Renovated in the early 1970s, the Whitcomb Hotel has now become "The Whitcomb," a four-star senior living community. It is one of Southwestern Michigan's most coveted retirement communities where St. Joe's history continues to shine.

== Famous Guests ==
The Whitcomb Hotels (both old and new) have hosted a variety of famous people over the years.

- Theodore Roosevelt, the 26th President of the United States
- Al Capone, American Gangster
- Jane Addams, Philanthropist and Political Activist
- Eleanor Roosevelt, First Lady of the United States
- Marian Anderson, American Singer
- Debbie Reynolds, American Actress
- Ann Landers, American Columnist

== Settings in Popular Culture ==
- The Adventures of Augie March, In the book, the fictitious Merritt Hotel in St. Joseph where Augie meets Thea Fenchel is based on The Whitcomb
- The Girls of Summer
