= Old U.S. Post Office (Niles, Michigan) =

- Old US Post Office
- U.S. National Register of Historic Places
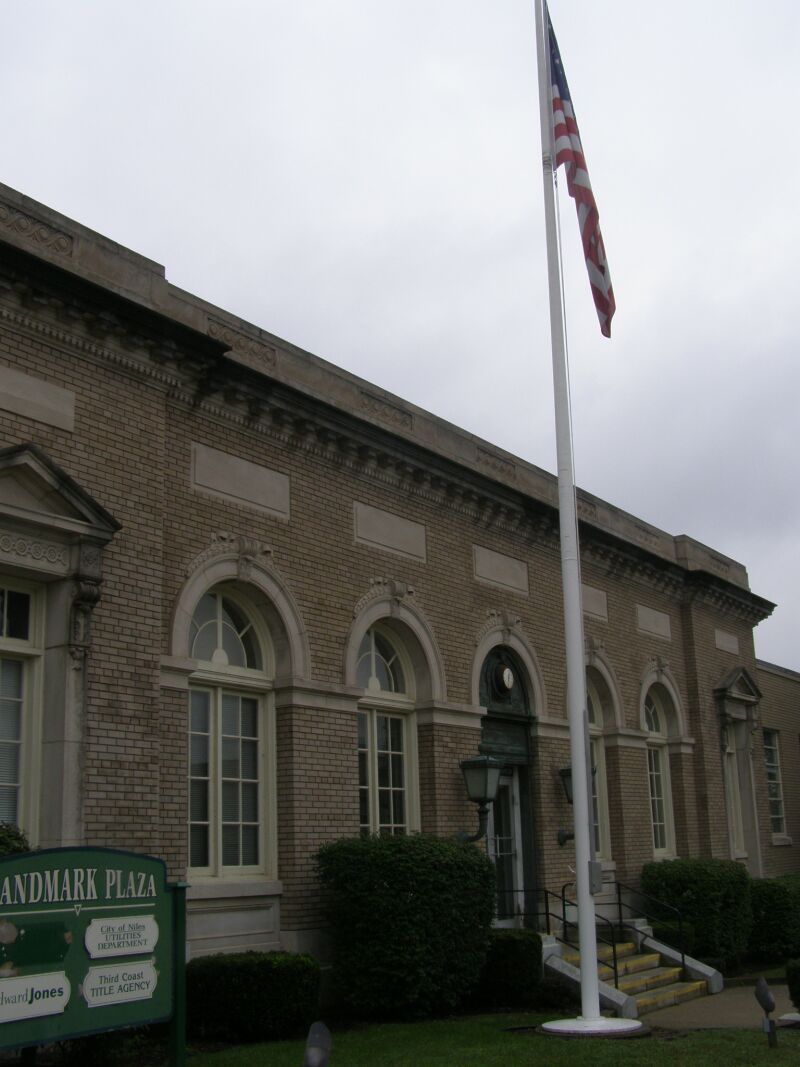
- Old U.S. Post Office, 2010

- Location within Michigan Location within the United States
- Interactive map showing the location of the Old U.S. Post Office, Niles
- Location: 322 E. Main St., Niles, Michigan
- Coordinates: 41°49′46″N 86°16′2″W
- Area: 1 acre (0.40 ha)
- Built: 1909
- Built by: Max Stock
- Architect: James Knox Taylor
- Architectural style: Classical Revival
- NRHP reference No.: 85002152
- Added to NRHP: September 12, 1985

The Old U.S. Post Office in Niles, Michigan is a Classical Revival building that was built in 1909. It was listed on the National Register of Historic Places in 1985.

== History ==
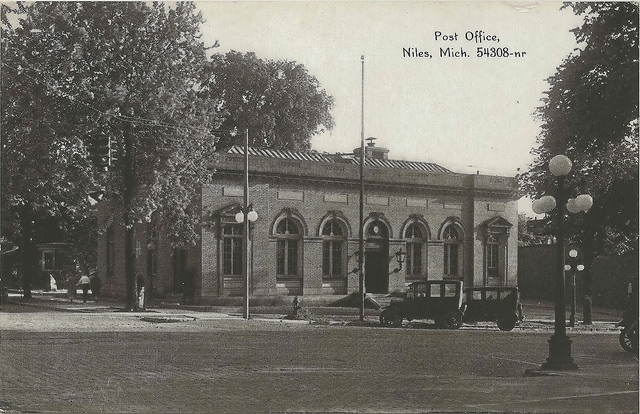
Post Office, c. 1909

By 1909, Niles had over 7000 residents, and a need for a new post office. Local congressman Edward LaRue Hamilton secured appropriations for theis building, and the cornerstone was laid in June 1909. The structure was designed by the office of the Supervising Architect of the Treasury, James Knox Taylor, and Max Stock of St. Joseph, Michigan was awarded the contract for the building's construction. A rear addition was constructed in 1937, and another addition constructed in 1956. The building served as Niles' post office until 1982, when a much larger structure was erected.

The city of Niles took ownership of the building in 1983. In 2016 there was a proposal at the Niles City Council for the building to be renovated at cost of $800,000, in order for some of its space to be used by the Michigan secretary of state's office. "'It's a classy looking building and will be a fine anchor for the downtown,' said one councilman. The building is being converted to apartments, with completion expected in early 2021.

== Description ==
The Old Post Office building is a one-story, Classical Revival structure faced with buff brick and limestone. It has a full basement and a copper roof, and sits on a gently sloping lot. The structure consists of thee sections: the original portion constructed in 1909, a rear wing added in 1937 which corresponds closely to the original building in its architectural style, and a large contemporary addition constructed in 1956.

The two older sections are of buff trick standing on granite block foundation. Exterior detailing of both sections is in limestone, including a dentil-trimmed main cornice, window surrounds, and panels above and below the windows. Bronze lighting fixtures flank the main entrance. The 1956 addition nearly doubles the size of the building, but the slight setback, reduced height, and harmonious use of materials serves to reinforce the visual importance of the original building.
