= Paine Bank =

- U.S. National Register of Historic Places
- Michigan State Historic Site
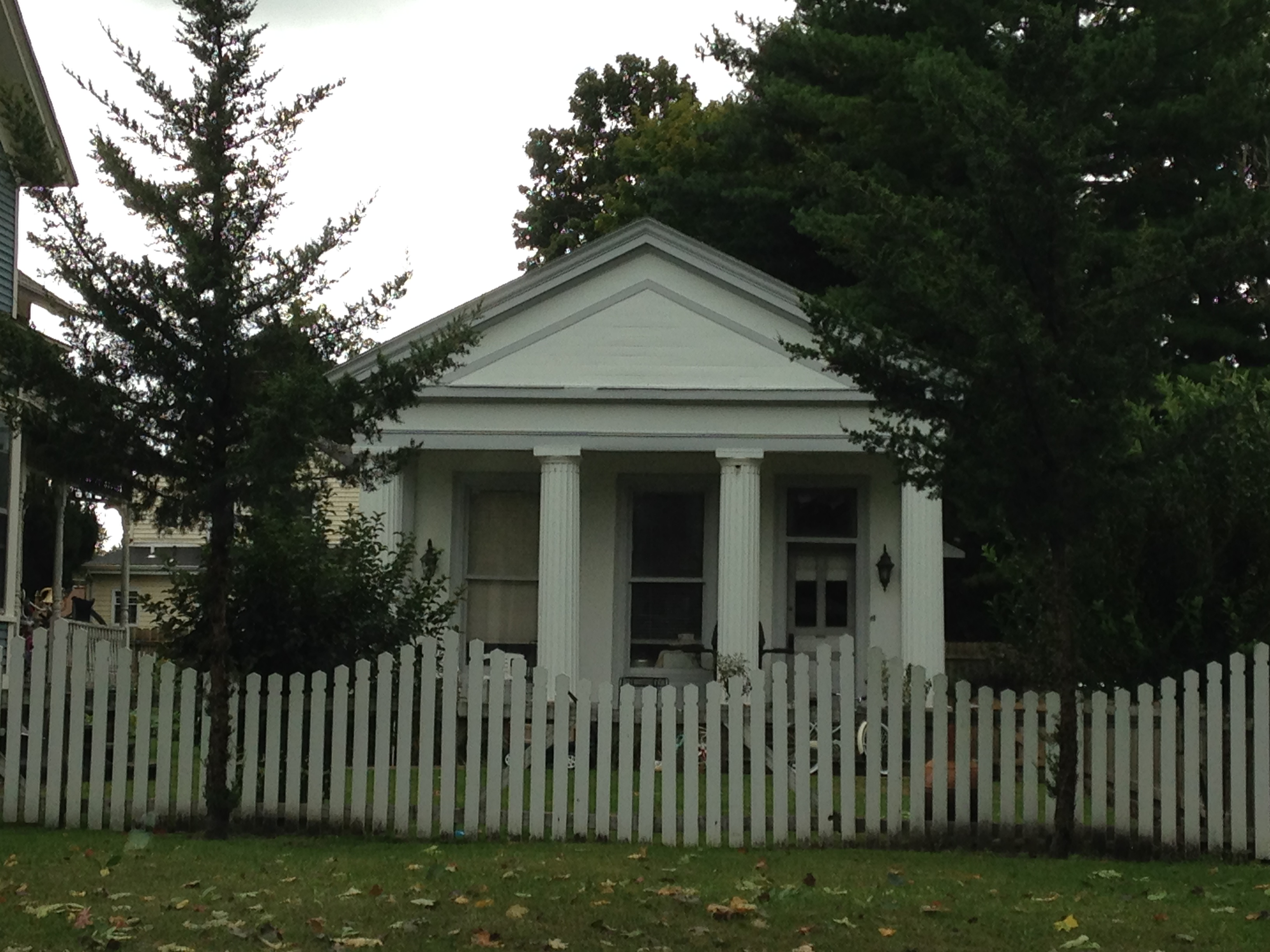

- Location within Michigan Location within the United States
- Interactive map
- Location: 1008 Oak St., Niles, Michigan
- Coordinates: 41°49′36″N 86°14′52″W
- Area: less than one acre
- Built: 1843
- Architectural style: Greek Revival
- NRHP reference No.: 73000945
- Added to NRHP: May 8, 1973

The Paine Bank is a historic bank building located at 1008 Oak Street in Niles, Michigan. It was listed on the National Register of Historic Places in 1973.

== History ==
Rodney C. Paine grew up in New York state, and worked as a clerk in a canal office, post office, and bank. In 1836, his brother-in-law John A. Welles, who was a cashier at the Farmers & Mechanics Bank in Detroit, asked Paine to open a branch in western Michigan, which was rapidly expanding at the time. Paine opened an office in St. Joseph, and quickly gained the trust of the community and was elected county treasurer. In fact, during the Panic of 1837, Paine issued notes without security, but (it was said) were accepted on the basis of his endorsement alone. These notes were known as "Paine's Money."

In 1840, Paine moved to Niles and opened an agency there. In 1843, he constructed this small Greek Revival bank building on the corner of Third and Main Streets. He also constructed a home nearby (now the Ring Lardner House). Paine's bank operated as an agency of the Farmers & Mechanics Bank until 1852, after which if became a private bank, known as Paine's Bank, owned and operated by Rodney C. Paine. Paine worked at promoting the development of Niles, investing in local industry, serving as the director of the public schools, and being elected to the state senate in 1855. Paine died in 1875.

The bank building has been moved twice; once in 1883 to South Third Street, and again in 1961 to its current location. It is currently used for storage.

== Description ==
Paine's Bank is a small, white, single story, frame Greek Revival building. It has a pedimented tetrastyle Greek Doric portico with fluted columns and antae at the corners of the building.
