= Ring Lardner House =

Historic house in Michigan, United States

- U.S. National Register of Historic Places
- Michigan State Historic Site
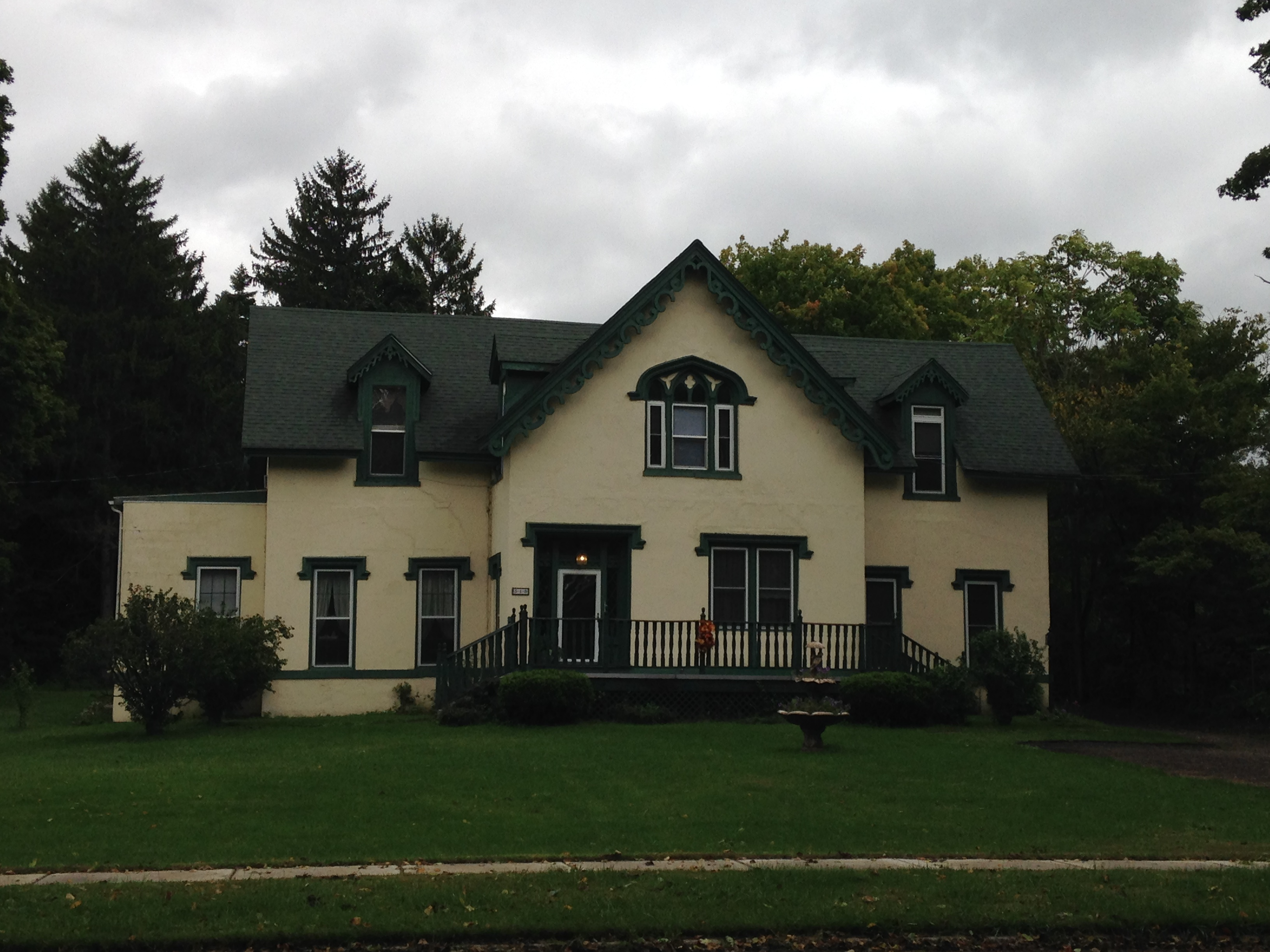

- Location within Michigan Location within the United States
- Interactive map
- Location: 519 Bond St., Niles, Michigan
- Coordinates: 41°49′22″N 86°15′17″W
- Area: less than one acre
- Built: 1850
- Architectural style: Gothic Revival
- NRHP reference No.: 72000595
- Added to NRHP: March 16, 1972

The Ring Lardner House is a private house located at 519 Bond Street in Niles, Michigan where American author Ring Lardner was born in 1885. It was listed on the National Register of Historic Places in 1972.

== History ==
This house was constructed in about 1850 by R.C. Paine, a local banker and for some time the mayor of Niles. Paine died in 1875 and the house was purchased by Henry Lardner, Ring Lardner's father. Ring Lardner was born here in 1885 and lived here until his graduation from high school in 1901, when he moved to Chicago. He returned to Niles soon after, and began his career writing articles on sporting events for the Niles Sun, and then moved on again.

The house was lived in for many years by Ring's sister Lena, who taught music. She eventually sold it, and in 1940 it was converted into apartments.

== Description ==
The Ring Lardner House is a 1 1/2-story Gothic Revival house with a gabled roof and dormers. It is clad with stucco. The dormers and roof have ornamental vergeboards
