= Three Oaks, Michigan =

- Village
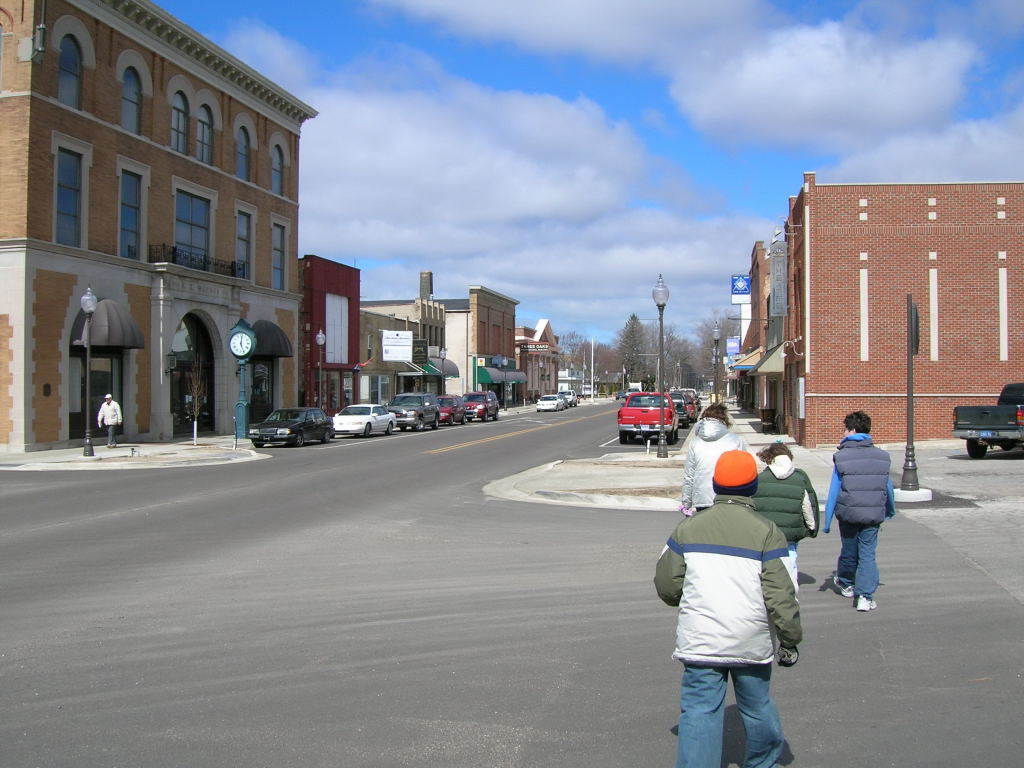
- Looking north along N. Elm Street

- logo

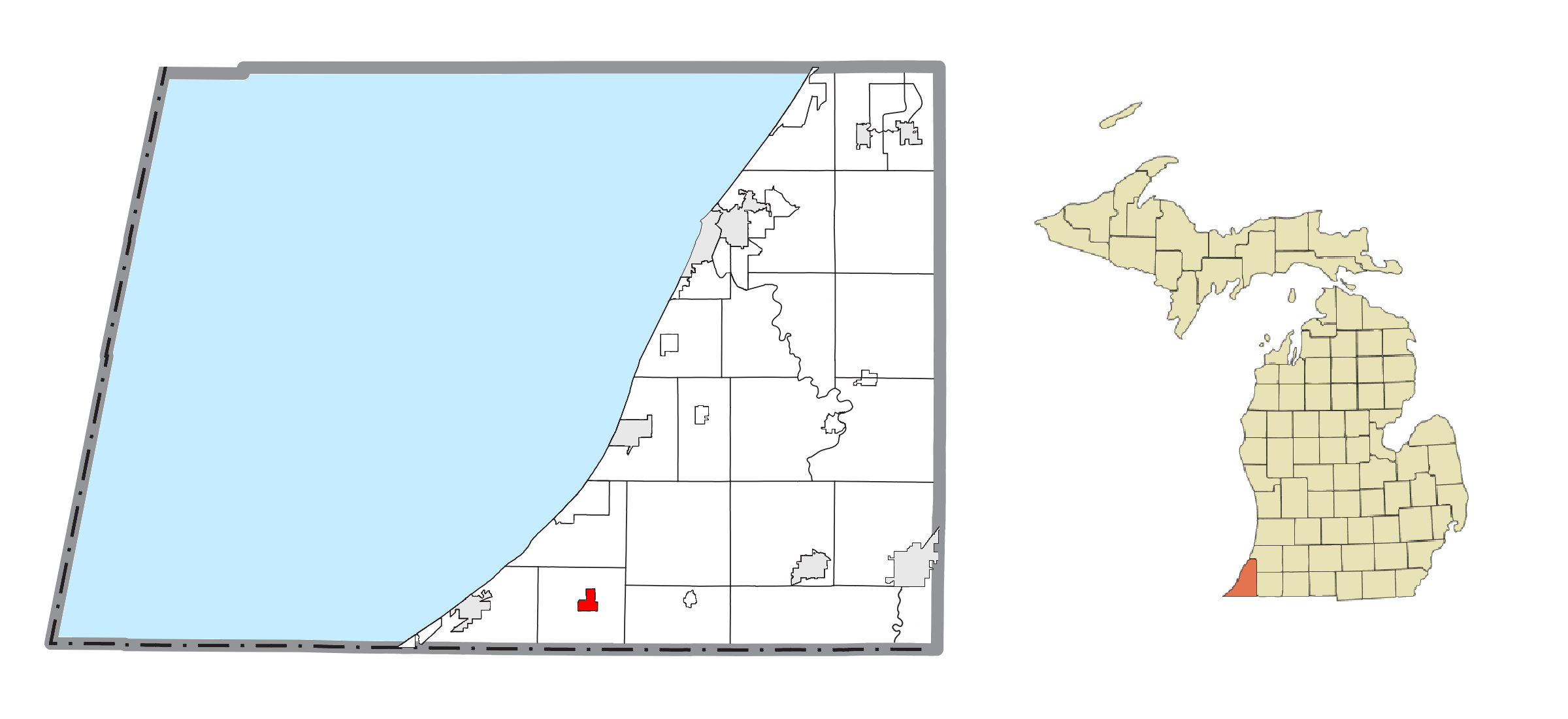
- Location within Berrien County

- Location within the state of Michigan
- Coordinates: 41°48′1″N 86°36′35″W
- Country: United States
- State: Michigan
- County: Berrien
- Township: Three Oaks

Government
  - Type: Village council
  - President: Dave Grosse

Area
  - Total: 1.09 sq mi (2.83 km^{2})
  - Land: 1.09 sq mi (2.83 km^{2})
  - Water: 0 sq mi (0.00 km^{2})
- Elevation: 692 ft (211 m)

Population (2020)
  - Total: 1,370
  - Density: 1,254/sq mi (484.1/km^{2})
- Time zone: UTC-5 (Eastern (EST))
  - Summer (DST): UTC-4 (EDT)
- ZIP code(s): 49128
- Area code: 269
- FIPS code: 26-79720
- GNIS feature ID: 1614822
- Website: Official website

Three Oaks is a village in Three Oaks Township, Berrien County in the U.S. state of Michigan. The population was 1,370 at the 2020 census.

The village of Three Oaks is located in the southwest corner of Michigan, just 5 miles from the shores of Lake Michigan and within 2 miles of the Indiana state line along US 12.

== History ==
The village was first settled by Henry Chamberlain in 1850 and became a village in 1867. The village was originally called Chamberlain's Siding but was changed to Three Oaks. These oak trees were a guidepoint for train engineers. None of the original three oak trees remain today; the last was cut down in the early 20th century.

Three Oaks' hometown pride is evident during its Flag Day Celebration in June. The celebration and Flag Day Parade is claimed to be the largest in the country.

"Apple Cider Century" is a bicycle ride of 15, 25, 37, 50, 62, 75 or 100 miles around Three Oaks. It was started by the Three Oaks Spokes Bicycle Club in 1974. More than 6,000 riders take part annually. It is held on the last Sunday of September.

Three Oaks celebrated the centennial of receiving the Dewey Cannon at the village's Flag Day Festival (June 9–11, 2000). A historical marker at Dewey Cannon Park in Three Oaks relates: "This cannon, captured in the Spanish–American War by Admiral Dewey, was presented to Three Oaks when its citizens raised fourteen hundred dollars for a memorial to the men of the battleship Maine. This was the largest contribution, per capita, of any community in the nation. 'Three Oaks Against the World', a local paper proudly boasted. This park was dedicated October 17, 1899, by President William McKinley, and others. Presentation of the cannon took place on June 28, 1900. Guest of honor was Helen Miller Gould, called the Spanish–American War's 'Florence Nightingale'. Thousands of people were in attendance on each occasion." The Dewey Cannon, which remains on display in the park of the same name, bears the engraved monogram of Queen Isabella II of Spain.

The Christmas movie Prancer, released in 1989, was filmed on location largely in the village of Three Oaks(other locations in nearby LaPorte, Indiana, were also used). A sequel, Prancer Returns, was made in 2001 (filming location Uxbridge, Ontario), in which a boy comes to Three Oaks to learn about the "Prancer incident".

Three Oaks is also home to the Warren Featherbone Factory, which was built over a century ago by Edward Kirk Warren to strip turkey feathers of their quills to use in women's garments of the era, such as corsets, which used "stiffeners". This replacement for the "whalebone" material was welcomed by the garment industry of the late 19th century. The factory still stands today and houses the Journeyman Distillery, Acorn Theater, and Featherbone Factory.

A financial crisis occurred in 2008, after the village proceeded with a $350,000 five block street project. This and other expenses over the previous four years left Three Oaks a deficit of about $600,000 (about a one-year budget) by April 2008. The Village President, the Clerk, and a councilman resigned while two councilmen did not seek re-election. On November 4, 2008, a new slate of village councilors were voted into office. The village faced bankruptcy in early December 2008 due to fiscal mismanagement and the State of Michigan took over financial management of the village with the appointment of a financial manager. The state of Michigan appointed Emergency Financial Manager Pam Amato effective December 17, 2008, to take over village operations and guide the newly elected Council through development of a five-year deficit elimination plan. On April 29, 2009, the EFM laid off every officer except the chief of police. The laid off officers were brought back around two weeks later. The village was given a recommendation to disband its Downtown Development Authority, after an audit showed receipt of excess funds that should have gone to the school district. Amato ended work as the emergency manager on December 4, 2009. On February 10, 2010, the Village of Three Oaks hired Patrick Yoder to serve as the first Village Manager.

== Geography ==
According to the United States Census Bureau, the village has a total area of 0.99 square miles (2.56 km^{2}), all land.

== Demographics ==
Historical population
Census	Pop.	Note	%±
1870	499		—
1880	474		−5.0%
1890	885		86.7%
1900	994		12.3%
1910	1,175		18.2%
1920	1,362		15.9%
1930	1,336		−1.9%
1940	1,351		1.1%
1950	1,572		16.4%
1960	1,763		12.2%
1970	1,750		−0.7%
1980	1,774		1.4%
1990	1,786		0.7%
2000	1,829		2.4%
2010	1,622		−11.3%
2020	1,370		−15.5%
U.S. Decennial Census

=== 2010 census ===
As of the census of 2010, there were 1,622 people, 678 households, and 422 families living in the village. The population density was 1,638.4 inhabitants per square mile (632.6/km^{2}). There were 797 housing units at an average density of 805.1 per square mile (310.9/km^{2}). The racial makeup of the village was 93.2% White, 1.1% African American, 1.4% Native American, 0.6% Asian, 0.1% Pacific Islander, 1.7% from other races, and 1.8% from two or more races. Hispanic or Latino residents of any race were 4.4% of the population.

There were 678 households, of which 31.4% had children under the age of 18 living with them, 43.5% were married couples living together, 14.2% had a female householder with no husband present, 4.6% had a male householder with no wife present, and 37.8% were non-families. 31.0% of all households were made up of individuals, and 10.5% had someone living alone who was 65 years of age or older. The average household size was 2.39 and the average family size was 3.01.

The median age in the village was 39.3 years. 24.4% of residents were under the age of 18; 8.1% were between the ages of 18 and 24; 25.6% were from 25 to 44; 28.5% were from 45 to 64; and 13.4% were 65 years of age or older. The gender makeup of the village was 48.6% male and 51.4% female.

=== 2000 census ===
As of the census of 2000, there were 1,829 people, 741 households, and 486 families living in the village. The population density was 1,861.4 inhabitants per square mile (718.7/km^{2}). There were 800 housing units at an average density of 814.2 per square mile (314.4/km^{2}). The racial makeup of the village was 96.34% White, 0.93% African American, 0.77% Native American, 0.11% Asian, 0.66% from other races, and 1.20% from two or more races. Hispanic or Latino residents of any race were 1.86% of the population.

There were 741 households, out of which 34.7% had children under the age of 18 living with them, 47.8% were married couples living together, 13.4% had a female householder with no husband present, and 34.3% were non-families. 29.3% of all households were made up of individuals, and 12.3% had someone living alone who was 65 years of age or older. The average household size was 2.47 and the average family size was 3.05.

In the village, 27.4% of the population was under the age of 18, 9.2% was from 18 to 24, 29.4% from 25 to 44, 21.9% from 45 to 64, and 12.1% was 65 years of age or older. The median age was 34 years. For every 100 females, there were 96.0 males. For every 100 females age 18 and over, there were 88.5 males.

The median income for a household in the village was $34,120, and the median income for a family was $41,146. Males had a median income of $31,923 versus $20,875 for females. The per capita income for the village was $16,361. About 8.5% of families and 11.7% of the population were below the poverty line, including 14.3% of those under age 18 and 7.7% of those age 65 or over.

== Media ==
Three Oaks was the fictional setting of the soap opera, Young Doctor Malone, on radio and television from 1939 to 1960. Three Oaks was the setting of the 1989 film Prancer and town scenes and exteriors were shot there.

== Notable people ==
- Al Benson, radio DJ
- Henry Chamberlain, member of the Michigan House of Representatives
- Kim Clark, stage director and political candidate
- Frederic G. Donner, former chairman and CEO of General Motors
- Robert Hellenga, novelist and short story writer
- Ron Jelinek, member of the Michigan Legislature
- Carlos T. Mock, physician, activist, and journalist
- Elton Rynearson, athlete and coach
- Joe Savoldi, professional wrestler, football player, and spy
- Edward Kirk Warren, industrialist and inventor
- Donald S. Whitehead, two-time lieutenant governor of Idaho
