= The South County Gazette =

Newspaper

- Type: Weekly newspaper
- Format: Broadsheet
- Publisher: David Holgate
- Editor: David Johnson
- Headquarters: 110 N. Elm St. Three Oaks, Michigan 49128; United States
- Price: $52/year

The South County Gazette is a newspaper that served the southern Berrien County, Michigan communities of Bridgman, Buchanan, Galien, Harbert, Lakeside, New Buffalo, New Troy, Sawyer, Three Oaks, and Union Pier with news of local events and happenings.

The bulk of the region that was covered by this weekly is known as Harbor Country, a popular, upscale weekend gateway destination for Chicagoans.

Each full page measured 11 x 22 inches (27.9 x 55.9 cm) in size, and the typical issue ran to eight pages in two sections (plus inserts).

The Gazette was one of three weekly newspapers that served the inhabitants of Harbor County, the others being Harbor Country News and the New Buffalo Times.
