= New Buffalo Times =

Newspaper in New Buffalo, Michigan

- The Official Newspaper of New Buffalo • Since 1942
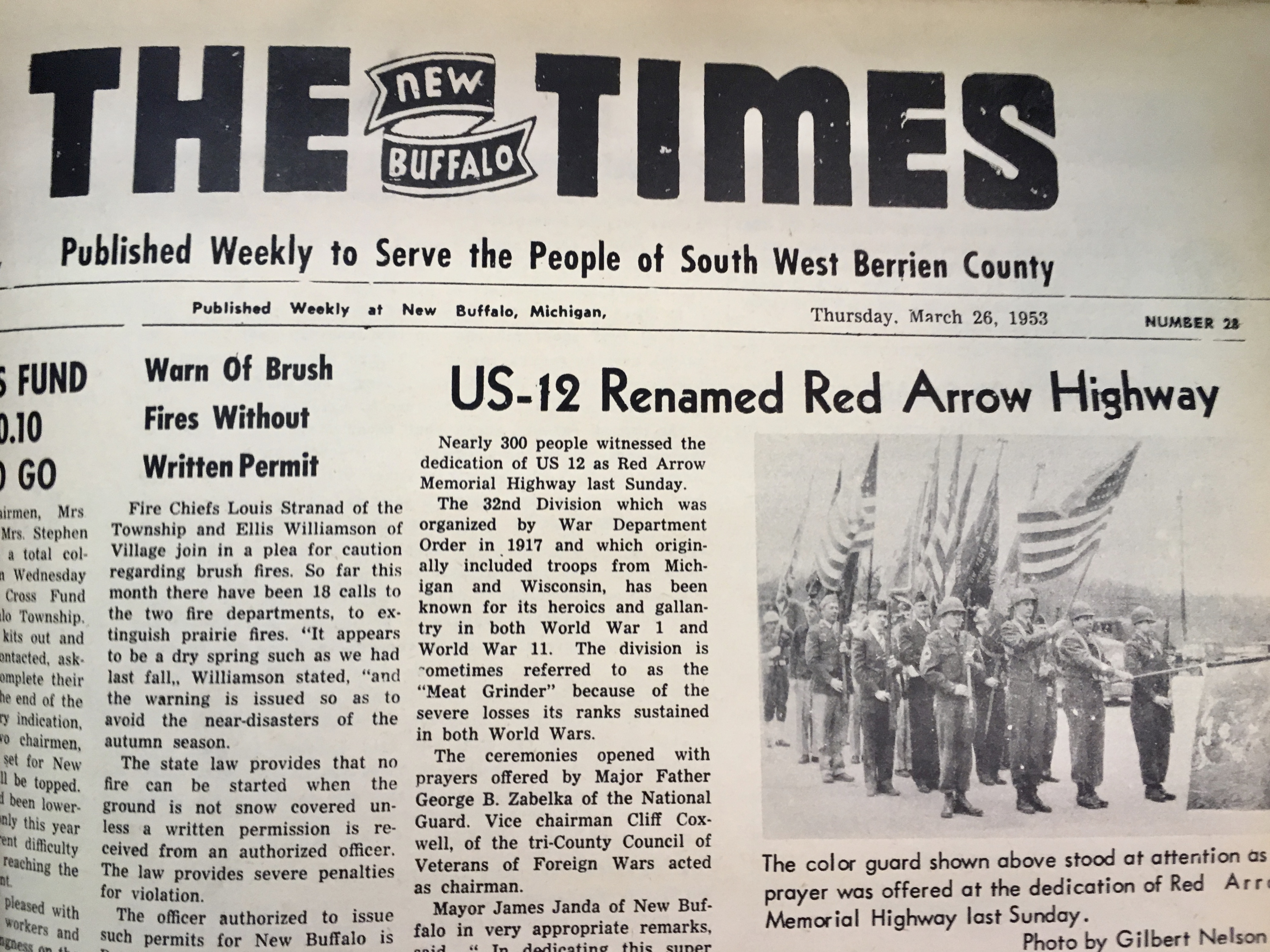
- Front Page of the Times on March 26th, 1953.
- Type: Weekly newspaper
- Format: Tabloid
- Owner(s): New Buffalo Times, INC.
- Founder: Vilma Andras Roumell
- Publisher: New Buffalo Times Intelligence
- Editor: Kristin E. Fatouros
- Staff writers: 13
- Founded: 1942
- Language: English
- Headquarters: P.O. Box 369; 140 N. Whittaker St. New Buffalo, Michigan 49117; United States
- City: New Buffalo, MI
- Country: United States
- Circulation: 5,000+
- OCLC number: 36641487
- Website: newbuffalotimes.com

The New Buffalo Times is a source of information on news and events in the city of New Buffalo and surrounding New Buffalo Township, plus other communities within the Harbor Country region of southwestern Berrien County, Michigan. It is a weekly newspaper published each Thursday.

The Times is one of three weekly newspapers serving the inhabitants of Harbor Country, the others being Harbor Country News and The South County Gazette.

== History ==
The New Buffalo Times was founded by Vilma Roumell in 1942. The paper focussed mainly on real estate and targeted individuals looking to vacation in New Buffalo and Berrien County. She sold the paper in 1978 to Robert Zonka who was an assistant managing editor of the Chicago Sun-Times. Zonka cut back on the real estate section and brought in a Journalistic perspective. Zonka died in 1985 and his friend John McHugh took over. They sold the times a year later to Mike Miller, a native of New Buffalo. Miller made many changes to the paper during his time. As an effort to connect the paper to the community, Miller incorporated letters from the readers to voice their complaints and suggestions for local events.

Miller's wife Mary Beth Moriarty took over the paper in 1992. She took the paper in a different direction. She turned it into a hometown weekly newspaper. She was invested in the community and used the newspaper as a platform to help New Buffalo. She wrote about the community and local events. Moriarty starting writing about the boy scouts and Miss New Buffalo. She included local elections and even added local birthdays. She met with the New Buffalo city council to move the legal advertising to the Harbor Country News.

In 2012, Moriarty sold the paper to Dee Dee Duhn. Duhn had worked for Custom Imports for many years and was in love with New Buffalo. Duhn aimed to reorganize the paper and take it down a new path. She brought on a new team to help her out. She included a section on sports and distanced the paper from journalistic stories. She increased the number of advertisements featured on the paper and trimmed down the amount of content the paper featured. Duhn focused on how good the town was and stayed away from controversial stories. On June 21, 2018, Dee Dee Duhn announced her retirement from the Times. She will continue to be a consultant of the paper. Duhn gave the paper to her editor Kristin Fatouros. The paper is located in the same building as Duhn's Custom Imports.

== Coverage ==
The New Buffalo Times has feature stories, local scoops, and events. They maintain weekly sports and obituary sections as well. They have sections on real estate, a horoscope, and classified ads. The paper features mostly local events and occasionally includes producer notes from Duhn. The paper consists mostly of advertisements for local businesses and events.

The paper covers all of New Buffalo as well as Chicago, Long Beach, Michiana Shores, Grand Beach, Union Pier, Three Oaks, Lakeside, Harbert, and Sawyer.
