= Lakeside, Berrien County, Michigan =

Lakeside, Michigan
- Unincorporated community
- Location within the state of Michigan Lakeside (the United States)
- Coordinates: 41°50′57″N 86°40′04″W
- Country: United States
- State: Michigan
- County: Berrien
- Township: Chikaming
- Elevation: 643 ft (196 m)

Population (2020)
  - Total: 239
- Time zone: UTC-5 (Eastern (EST))
  - Summer (DST): UTC-4 (EDT)
- ZIP code(s): 49116
- Area code: 269
- GNIS feature ID: 630020

Lakeside is an unincorporated community in Chikaming Township of Berrien County in the U.S. state of Michigan. It is situated on the shore of Lake Michigan just west of Interstate 94. It is part of a group of communities known as "Harbor Country" which includes New Buffalo, Three Oaks, Harbert, Union Pier, Grand Beach and Sawyer.

The ZIP code is 49116 and the FIPS place code is 45080.
