= Harbor Country =

Region of Southwestern Michigan, US

Coordinates: 41.827°N 86.694°W

Harbor Country, Michigan Map

Harbor Country is a region of Southwestern Michigan just north of the Indiana state line. It is notable as a popular, upscale weekend getaway destination, particularly for Chicagoans looking to enjoy the region's beaches, bed and breakfasts, and wineries.

The region consists of eight small towns along the eastern shore of Lake Michigan in Berrien County: New Buffalo, Union Pier, Three Oaks, Lakeside, Grand Beach, Michiana, Harbert, and Sawyer.

The region is served by the weekly Harbor Country News.
