= Galena River (Indiana) =

River in Indiana and Michigan, United States

Galena River (Indiana) Galina Creek, Golina Creek

Location
- Country: United States
- State: Indiana, Michigan
- Region: Berrien County, LaPorte County

Physical characteristics
- Source
  - location: Springfield Township, LaPorte County, Indiana, United States
  - coordinates: 41°41′07″N 086°42′40″W
  - elevation: 720 ft (220 m)
- Mouth: South Branch Galien River
  - location: Berrien County, Michigan
  - coordinates: 41°45′42″N 086°39′25″W
  - elevation: 610 ft (190 m)
- Discharge
  - location: mouth
  - average: 39.59 cu ft/s (1.121 m^{3}/s) (estimate)

Basin features
- Tributaries
  - left: Warwick Ditch
  - right: Spring Creek

The Galena River is an 8.5-mile-long (13.7 km) stream in northern Indiana in the United States. It rises in the northeast corner of Springfield Township, about 5 miles (8 km) north of LaPorte in LaPorte County and flows northeast. Just after it crosses the state boundary into Three Oaks Township in Berrien County, Michigan, it is joined from the east by Spring Creek to form the South Branch Galien River. After becoming the Galien River in Michigan, the river ultimately flows to Lake Michigan in New Buffalo.

== History ==
The river was named after René Bréhant de Galinée, a French missionary and explorer. In Michigan the name was changed to Galien River by legislative action in 1829, and presumably the Indiana Galena River tributary has the same etymology.

== Watershed ==
Although the Galena River is mostly in Indiana, the entire Galena/Galien watershed consists of 112,222 acres (45,415 ha), of which one-quarter, 29,630 acres (11,990 ha), are in Indiana, the remainder being in Berrien County, Michigan. In Indiana, the watershed remains relatively undeveloped; the two principal land uses are forest and agriculture. There are no large urbanized areas in the watershed. In comparison to other watersheds along the Lake Michigan coastal area, the Galena River has not been significantly impacted by human influence,

Within Indiana, the Galena River watershed is located within the physiographic unit known as the Valparaiso Morainal Area. The Valparaiso Moraine, located south of the Lacustrine Plain, is an arc-shaped moraine complex that parallels the southern shore of Lake Michigan. The moraine divides LaPorte County into northern and southern drainage areas. The area north drains into Lake Michigan; south of the moraine water drains to the Kankakee River. Numerous kettle lakes sit on the moraine. Land use in the watershed is principally forest and agriculture.

== Ecology ==
The Galena River originates from two wetland sources, the 165-acre (67 ha) Galena Wetland Conservation Area and a 45-acre (18 ha) prairie fen called the Springfield Fen Nature Preserve, which join to form the river. Typical presettlement vegetation consisted of extensive forests, specifically oak-hickory forests in uplands, and beech or northern swamp forest in wetlands, although today most of the old growth forests have been harvested.

== Pollution ==
In 2009, Escherichia coli exceeded water quality standards at eight of nine sampling sites. The most common sources of E. coli are livestock operations, failing septic systems, illicit sewage connections, and combined sewer overflows. The Indiana Department of Natural Resources has designated the Galena River as a salmonid stream, which requires a higher level of water quality standards.

== See also ==
- List of rivers of Indiana
- Galien River
