= New Buffalo Township, Michigan =

- Civil township
- Seal

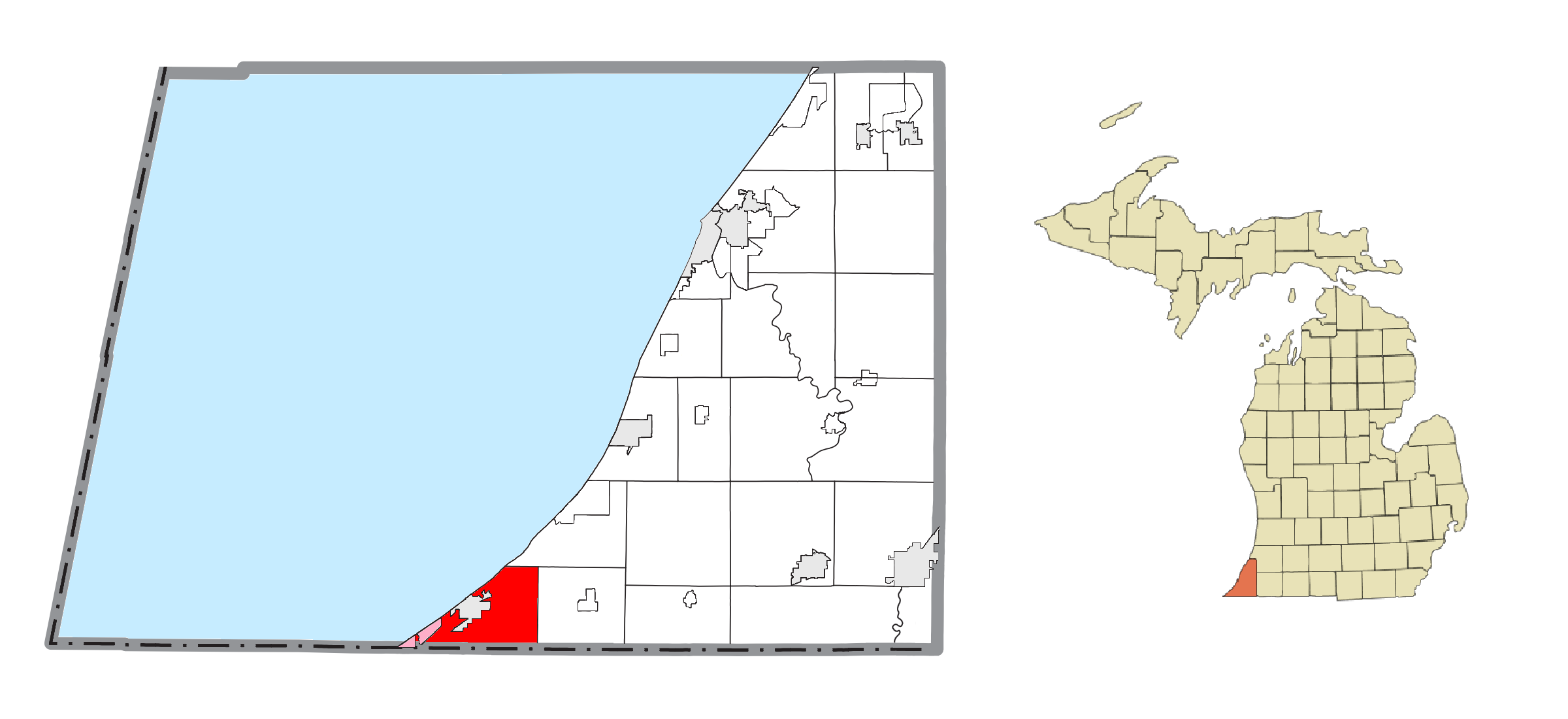
- Location within Berrien County (red) and the administered villages of Grand Beach and Michiana (pink)

- Location within the state of Michigan New Buffalo Township (the United States)
- Coordinates: 41°47′18″N 86°45′23″W
- Country: United States
- State: Michigan
- County: Berrien
- Established: 1836

Area
  - Total: 20.3 sq mi (52.5 km^{2})
  - Land: 20.0 sq mi (51.8 km^{2})
  - Water: 0.23 sq mi (0.6 km^{2})
- Elevation: 653 ft (199 m)

Population (2020)
  - Total: 2,455
- Time zone: UTC-5 (Eastern (EST))
  - Summer (DST): UTC-4 (EDT)
- ZIP code(s): 49117, 49129
- Area code: 269
- FIPS code: 26-57230
- GNIS feature ID: 1626799
- Website: Official website

New Buffalo Township is a civil township of Berrien County in the U.S. state of Michigan. As of the 2020 census, the township population was 2,455. It is the southwesternmost township on the Lower Peninsula of Michigan.

== Communities ==
- The city of New Buffalo is within the township, but is administratively autonomous.
- The villages of Grand Beach and Michiana are also within the township.
- The unincorporated community of Union Pier is situated on the boundary between New Buffalo Township and Chikaming Township.

The township is part of a region sometimes referred to as Harbor Country.

== History ==
At the time of the arrival of the first Europeans to the area, French explorer Father Jacques Marquette in 1675 reported seeing the Miami people in his travels down the nearby St. Joseph River. Four years later, the exploration party of René-Robert Cavelier, Sieur de La Salle, reported that the Miami were being displaced by the Potawatomi.

When Berrien County was first established in 1831, New Buffalo was a part of Berrien Township. New Buffalo Township was established by an act of the state legislature on March 12, 1836. Five days later, the village of New Buffalo was incorporated. The township originally included what are now Three Oaks Township and Chikaming Township. Three Oaks and Chikaming were set apart in 1856.

In 1834, one of the first permanent European-American settlers to the area, Captain Wessell Whittaker, ran his schooner Post Boy aground near what is now the village of Grand Beach. The captain and crew found shelter a bit south of there at the present-day Michigan City, Indiana. While traveling north to St. Joseph to report the ship's loss to its underwriters, Whittacker was so struck by the beauty of the area and the natural harbor that he filed claim to a large tract of land around the mouth of the Galien River. Whittacker named it after his hometown of Buffalo, New York.

After laying out plans for the city and gaining partners to develop the area, the value of land rapidly increased in a period of land speculation. This lasted until the Panic of 1837, which brought an abrupt end to most speculative land development in the area for several years. Followed soon after by a severe winter in 1841, the area struggled economically. The western terminus of the Michigan Central Railroad in New Buffalo was completed in 1849. The harbor was improved and the economy flourished briefly until the railroad connection to Chicago was completed in 1853, after which the use of the harbor for shipping declined.

Around the turn of the century, the area began to be recognized for its vacation and resort potential, resulting in summer cottages, camps and hotels. 1921 saw the opening of the Golfmore Hotel, rated as one of the finest resorts on the Great Lakes. Unfortunately, the hotel was destroyed by fire in 1936. Like much of the country, the area struggled through the Great Depression, followed by booming growth after World War II.

During the 1970s and 1980s nightclubs just north of the Indiana state line in New Buffalo Township were popular destinations for young adults from Illinois and Indiana who were under age 21. Both of those states had minimum drinking ages of 21, whereas Michigan's minimum drinking age was 18.

== Geography ==
According to the United States Census Bureau, the township has a total area of 20.3 square miles (52.5 km^{2}), of which 20.0 square miles (51.8 km^{2}) is land and 0.23 square miles (0.6 km^{2}), or 1.21%, is water.

Due to the Lake Michigan shoreline on the northwest and the Indiana border to the south, New Buffalo Township has an irregular triangle shape and is one of the smallest townships in Michigan. Most survey townships are 36 square miles (93 km^{2}). However, the townships along the Michigan side of the Indiana border are truncated so that they are only 6 miles (10 km) wide by about 3.5 miles (5.6 km) tall. The village of Michiana within New Buffalo Township consists of the partial section 24 of survey township T8S R22E, the westernmost portion of the Lower Peninsula of Michigan. The rest of the township consists of the several partial and whole sections of T8S R21E as well as the western row of sections from T8S R20E, section 31 of T7S R20E, and section 35 and 36 of T7S R21E.

The Pokagon Indian Reservation is located within the township.

== Demographics ==
As of the census of 2000, there were 2,468 people, 1,093 households, and 718 families residing in the township. The population density was 121.9 inhabitants per square mile (47.1/km^{2}). There were 2,139 housing units at an average density of 105.6 per square mile (40.8/km^{2}). The racial makeup of the township was 93.88% White, 3.65% African American, 0.16% Native American, 0.32% Asian, 0.04% Pacific Islander, 0.28% from other races, and 1.66% from two or more races. Hispanic or Latino of any race were 1.62% of the population.

There were 1,093 households, out of which 20.1% had children under the age of 18 living with them, 55.8% were married couples living together, 6.8% had a female householder with no husband present, and 34.3% were non-families. 29.2% of all households were made up of individuals, and 12.8% had someone living alone who was 65 years of age or older. The average household size was 2.23 and the average family size was 2.74.

In the township the population was spread out, with 18.0% under the age of 18, 5.0% from 18 to 24, 22.9% from 25 to 44, 33.4% from 45 to 64, and 20.6% who were 65 years of age or older. The median age was 47 years. For every 100 females, there were 99.4 males. For every 100 females age 18 and over, there were 96.6 males.

The median income for a household in the township was $46,991, and the median income for a family was $58,333. Males had a median income of $46,411 versus $27,639 for females. The per capita income for the township was $33,587. About 3.5% of families and 6.3% of the population were below the poverty line, including 6.5% of those under age 18 and 5.4% of those age 65 or over.
