= Warren Featherbone Company Office Building =

- U.S. National Register of Historic Places
- Michigan State Historic Site
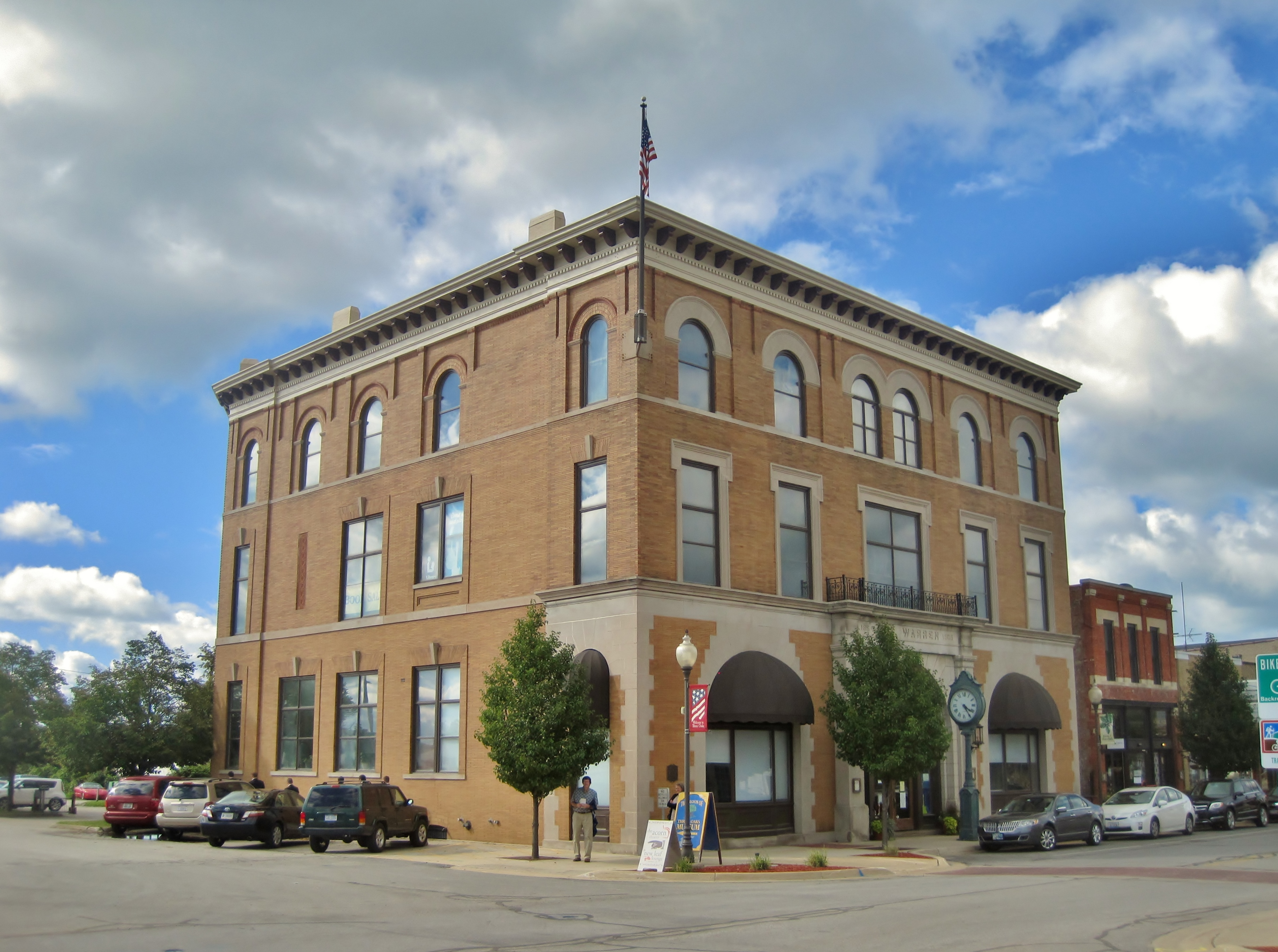

- Location within Michigan Location within the United States
- Interactive map
- Location: 3 N. Elm St., Three Oaks, Michigan
- Coordinates: 41°48′5″N 86°36′38″W
- Area: less than one acre
- Built: 1905
- Architect: George Allen
- Architectural style: Renaissance Revival
- NRHP reference No.: 86000117
- Added to NRHP: January 23, 1986

The Warren Featherbone Company Office Building is an office building located at 3 North Elm Street in Three Oaks, Michigan. It was listed on the National Register of Historic Places in 1986. It now houses the Three Oaks Public Library.

== History ==
Edward K. Warren arrived in Three Oaks in 1858 and opened a dry goods store. As a dry goods proprietor, he was familiar with complaints about the fragility of the then-common whalebone stays used in women's dresses. He also frequented the Chicago Feather Duster Company to purchase goods. It was there that he found out that the company disposed of turkey wing feathers as being too stiff to use in a feather duster. Warren eventually realized that stiff feather quills might make a suitable replacement for whalebone stays, and after some experimentation perfected a product which he christened the "featherbone." He opened the Warren Featherbone Company in 1883 to manufacture his new stays, and the product was an immediate success.

Warren's company continued to grow and expand, opening offices in Chicago and other cities. By 1905, the company needed a new office building, and Warren engaged architect George Allen to design this building as the headquarters for the Warren Featherbone Company and for the Warren Bank. Edward K. Warren died in 1919, but his companies survived, and in 1928 the Warren Featherbone Company and the Warren Bank moved to a new building. The Warren Featherstone Company diversified over the years, and now works in the healthcare and education fields. After it was vacated, this building was sold to the Edward K. Warren Foundation, a philanthropic organization established by E. K. Warren in 1917. The Foundation was responsible for donating land for both the Warren Dunes State Park and the Warren Woods State Park to the state of Michigan. The Foundation used this building to house its museum collection.

In 1951, the museum donated its entire collection to Michigan State University. After this, a number of commercial enterprises occupied the building, until 1983, when the Bank of Three Oaks, the successor to the E. K. Warren Bank, purchased the building. The bank rehabilitated the structure to house company offices. Various banks used the building until 1999, when Fifth Third Bank sold the structure to the Three Oaks Township Public Library. The library moved into the building in 2000 and continues to occupy it.

== Description ==
The Warren Featherbone Company Office Building is a three-story rectangular brick Renaissance Revival structure. Located on a street corner, the two principal facades are faced in orange brick and have limestone trim. The main facade is symmetrical, with broad, arched openings on the first floor, square-head windows on the second floor, and round-head windows flanked by piers on the third. A metal cornice tops the facade.

The central entrance leads to the interior lobby, with a stair to the second floor, and entrances to what were originally the banking room and the E. K. Warren office. The rear of the building contains a large room that was once manufacturing or storage space for the Warren Featherbone Company. The second floor contains offices across the front and an upper public banking room across the entire back. The third floor was originally used for storage.
