= Chikaming Township, Michigan =

- Civil township
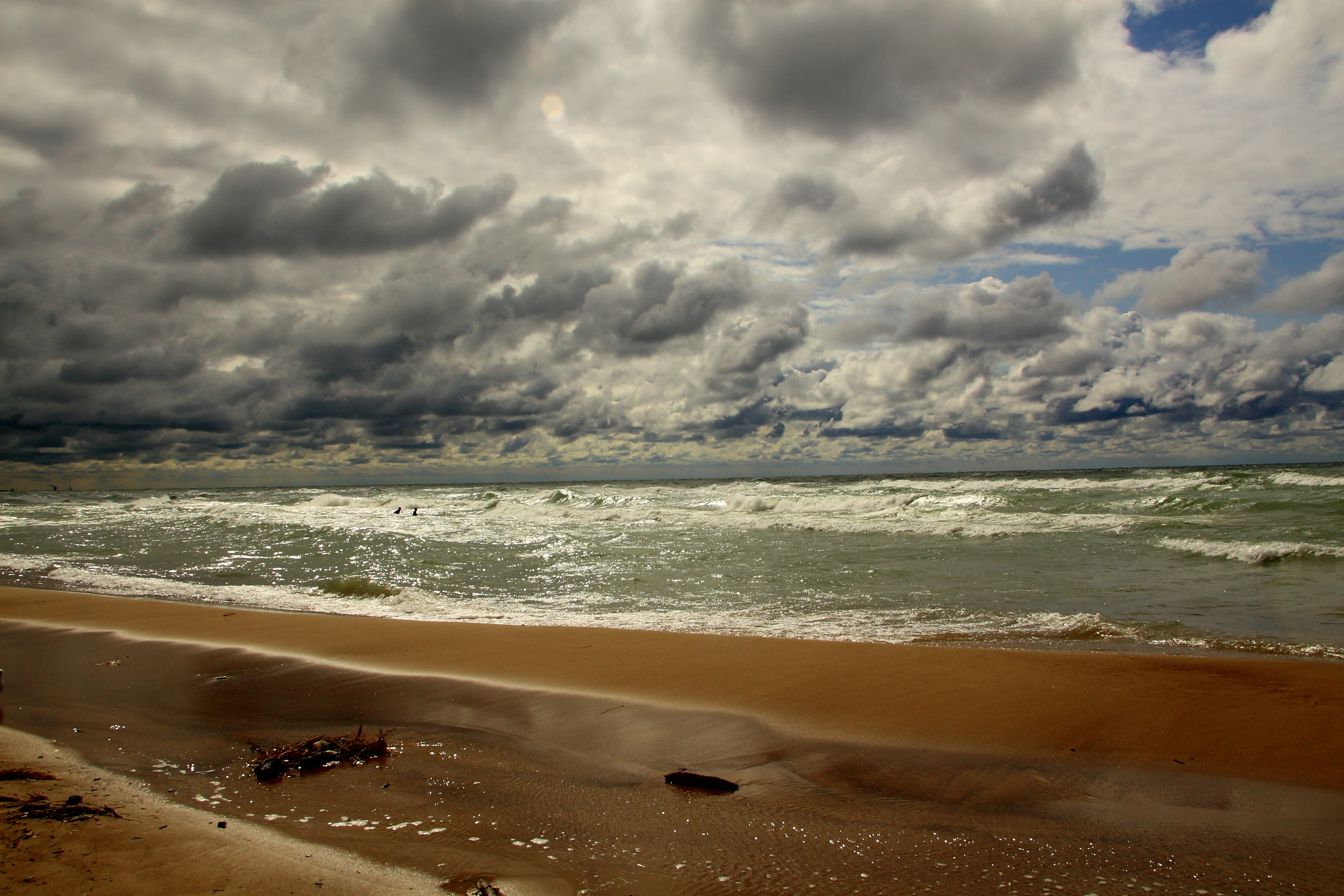
- Lake Michigan from the beach at Harbert

- Seal

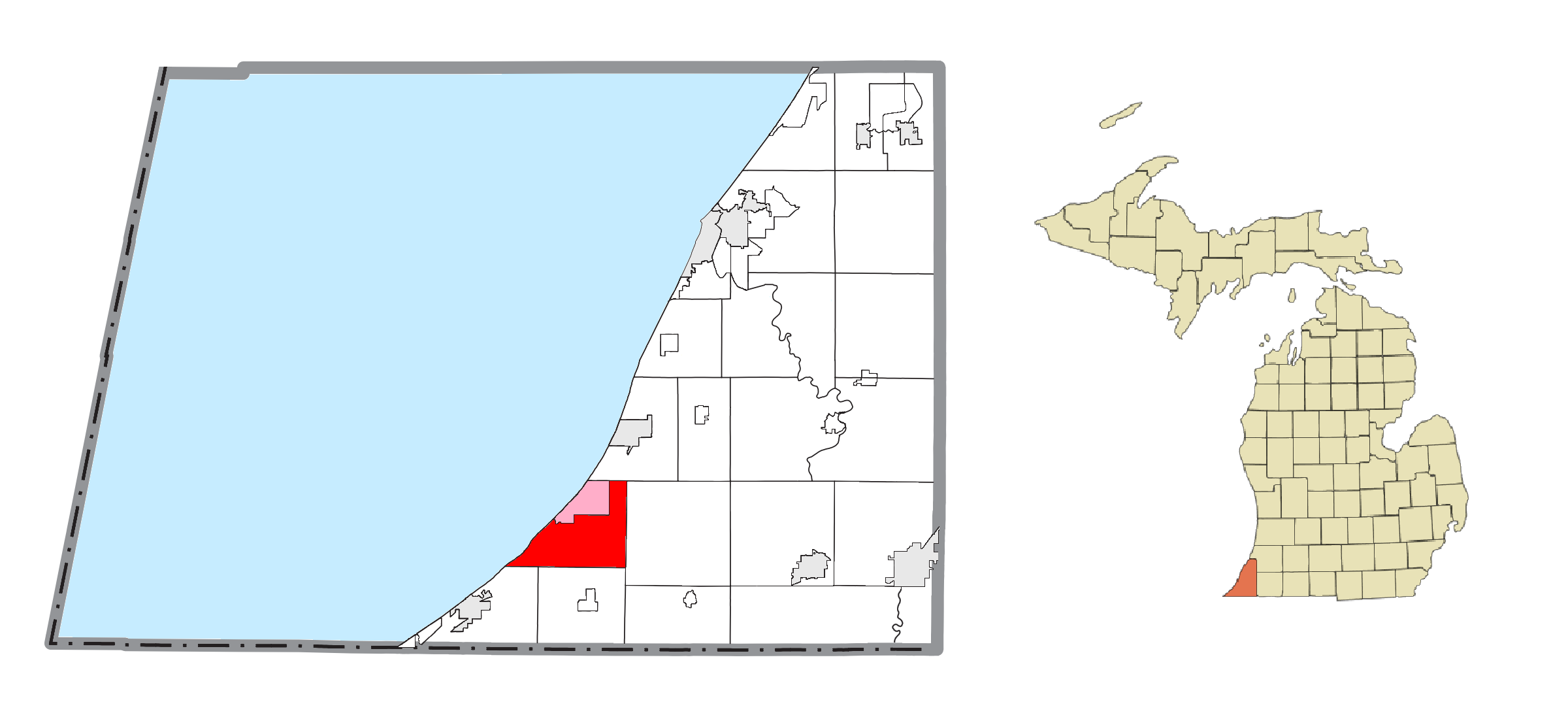
- Location within Berrien County (red) and the administered communities of Shorewood–Tower Hills–Harbert (pink)

- Location within the state of Michigan Chikaming Township (the United States)
- Coordinates: 41°51′54″N 86°38′10″W
- Country: United States
- State: Michigan
- County: Berrien
- Established: 1856

Area
  - Total: 22.1 sq mi (57.3 km^{2})
  - Land: 21.9 sq mi (56.8 km^{2})
  - Water: 0.19 sq mi (0.5 km^{2})
- Elevation: 640 ft (195 m)

Population (2020)
  - Total: 2,778
- Time zone: UTC-5 (Eastern (EST))
  - Summer (DST): UTC-4 (EDT)
- ZIP code(s): 49115, 49116, 49125, 49128, 49129
- Area code: 269
- FIPS code: 26-15480
- GNIS feature ID: 1626076
- Website: Official website

Chikaming Township is a civil township of Berrien County in the U.S. state of Michigan. As of the 2020 census, the township population was 2,778. The township is located in the west central portion of the county. Lake Michigan lies to the northwest, Lake Township is to the north and northeast, Weesaw Township is to the east, Three Oaks Township is to the south, and New Buffalo Township is to the southwest.

== History ==
Chikaming Township was established once the Miami people were deported from their land in Southwest Michigan. Chikaming Township was established in 1856. Although most traces of native history have been erased from the area, the name "Chikaming" (historically also spelled "Chickaming") is derived from one of the Algonquin languages meaning "lake".

== Communities ==
The unincorporated communities of Sawyer, Harbert, and Lakeside are all within the township, and Union Pier is partially located in both Chikaming and New Buffalo Township. The U.S. Census Bureau recognizes the Shorewood-Tower Hills-Harbert census-designated place in the northern third of the township for statistical purposes.

== Geography ==
According to the United States Census Bureau, the township has a total area of 22.1 square miles (57.3 km^{2}), of which 21.9 square miles (56.8 km^{2}) is land and 0.19 square miles (0.5 km^{2}), or 0.83%, is water.

Interstate 94 passes northeast–southwest through the township, parallel to the Lake Michigan shoreline.

Warren Woods State Park is within the township. The Galien River flows from northeast to southwest through the township.

== Demographics ==
Historical population
Census	Pop.	Note	%±
2000	3,678		—
2010	3,100		−15.7%
2020	2,778		−10.4%

As of the census of 2000, there were 3,678 people, 1,646 households, and 1,097 families residing in the township. The population density was 166.7 inhabitants per square mile (64.4/km^{2}). There were 3,473 housing units at an average density of 157.4 per square mile (60.8/km^{2}). The racial makeup of the township was 95.70% White, 2.26% African American, 0.38% Native American, 0.30% Asian, 0.03% Pacific Islander, 0.35% from other races, and 0.98% from two or more races. Hispanic or Latino of any race were 0.95% of the population.

There were 1,646 households, out of which 21.5% had children under the age of 18 living with them, 56.9% were married couples living together, 6.3% had a female householder with no husband present, and 33.3% were non-families. 28.8% of all households were made up of individuals, and 12.7% had someone living alone who was 65 years of age or older. The average household size was 2.23 and the average family size was 2.73.

In the township the population was spread out, with 19.8% under the age of 18, 4.2% from 18 to 24, 24.0% from 25 to 44, 30.1% from 45 to 64, and 21.9% who were 65 years of age or older. The median age was 46 years. For every 100 females, there were 97.5 males. For every 100 females age 18 and over, there were 95.0 males.

The median income for a household in the township was $47,778, and the median income for a family was $53,942. Males had a median income of $37,292 versus $22,500 for females. The per capita income for the township was $30,868. About 2.2% of families and 3.8% of the population were below the poverty line, including 4.8% of those under age 18 and 2.6% of those age 65 or over.
