= Harbor Country News =

Newspaper in New Buffalo, Michigan

- Type: Weekly newspaper
- Format: Compact
- Publisher: Bill Hackney
- Editor: David Johnson
- Headquarters: 122 N. Whittaker St. New Buffalo, Michigan 49107; 49117; United States
- Circulation: 8,509 (as of 2022)
- Website: harborcountry-news.com

The Harbor Country News is a weekly newspaper published by News-Dispatch Media / Paxton Media Group. It primarily serves the residents of, and their guests and other visitors to, the small communities of Harbor Country, a rural resort region bordering Lake Michigan in southwestern Berrien County, Michigan.

Printed every Thursday, Harbor Country News bills itself as "southwestern Berrien County’s best source for local news, sports, entertainment, things to do, and great places to shop!" While the news and advertising offices are located in New Buffalo, Michigan, the paper is printed in nearby Michigan City, Indiana.

Harbor Country News is one of three weekly newspapers serving the inhabitants of Harbor County, the others being the New Buffalo Times and The South County Gazette.
