= Blue Jay Creek =

Blue Jay Creek or Bluejay Creek may refer to:

- Blue Jay Creek (Lake Huron tributary), a stream in Ontario, Canada
- Bluejay Creek (Pic River tributary), a stream in Ontario, Canada
- Blue Jay Creek (Michigan), a stream in the United States
