= James L. Ziemer =

James L. Ziemer (born 1951) is the retired chief executive officer and President of Harley-Davidson. Ziemer became the company's CEO on April 30, 2005.

== Career ==
Before assuming his position, he had previously served as vice president and Chief Financial Officer of the company from December 1990 to April 2005 and President of The Harley-Davidson Foundation, Inc. from 1993 to March 6, 2006. He retired from his position in April 2009, ending his 40-year career with the company.

He was elected to Textron Board of Directors and appointed by George W. Bush as a member of the Advisory Committee for Trade Policy and Negotiations in 2007.

== Education ==
He graduated from the University of Wisconsin–Milwaukee with a bachelor's degree in Business Administration in 1975 and an executive MBA in 1986. Currently, he lives in Milwaukee and spends his summer months in New Buffalo, Michigan with his family.
