= Edward Kirk Warren =

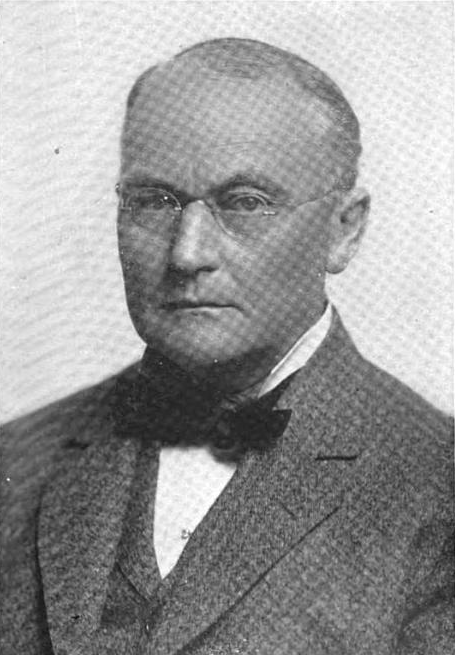
- Born: April 7, 1847; Ludlow, Vermont
- Died: January 16, 1919 (aged 71); Evanston, Illinois

Edward Kirk Warren (April 7, 1847 – January 16, 1919) was an American industrialist and inventor who developed featherbone, a popular alternative to whalebone in corsetry. He is the namesake of Warren Dunes State Park and Warren Woods State Park in Michigan, both of which he developed.

== Biography ==
Warren was born on April 7, 1847, in Ludlow, Vermont, to Waters and Caroline Warren. Warren was descended eight generations from an early American family; Joseph Warren came to the country from England in 1635. His great-grandfather fought in the American Revolution at the Battle of Bunker Hill. The son of a Congregationalist minister, Edward Kirk Warren was educated in public schools. In 1858, the family moved to Three Oaks, Michigan.

Upon reaching adulthood, Warren took a job working in a sawmill. On January 24, 1864, he started working for Henry Chamberlain, who owned a local dry goods store. He was married on November 3, 1867, to Sarah E. Stevens. In 1868, Warren opened a dry goods store with James L. McKie as McKie & Warren. The store was very successful, and the partnership purchased the interests of their chief competitor, Henry Chamberlain, in 1879. Sarah died in 1879. Edward remarried on February 17, 1880, to Mary Louise Chamberlain, the daughter of Henry Chamberlain.

While overseeing the store, Warren learned that his female clientele were unsatisfied with their whalebone corsets, which became brittle and stiff over time. During a trip to Chicago, Illinois, Warren visited a feather duster manufacturer and observed that the company discarded certain turkey wing feathers. These feathers were unsuitable for use in feather dusters, but were strong and pliable. By removing the plumage from these feathers, Warren was able to identify a substitute for whalebone. Warren experimented with developing a corset for a year before perfecting a design. US Patent 286,749 for "featherbone" was approved on October 16, 1883.

Warren organized the Warren Featherbone Company in Three Oaks to manufacture his product. Although stores were at first reluctant to stock the new material, the invention gradually increased in popularity. Warren left his mercantile enterprises to focus on his featherbone company, where he was company President until his death. In 1902, Warren organized the E. K. Warren & Co. banking house in Three Oaks. Seven years later, he returned to the mercantile trade with his son as Charles K. Warren & Co.

=== Personal life ===
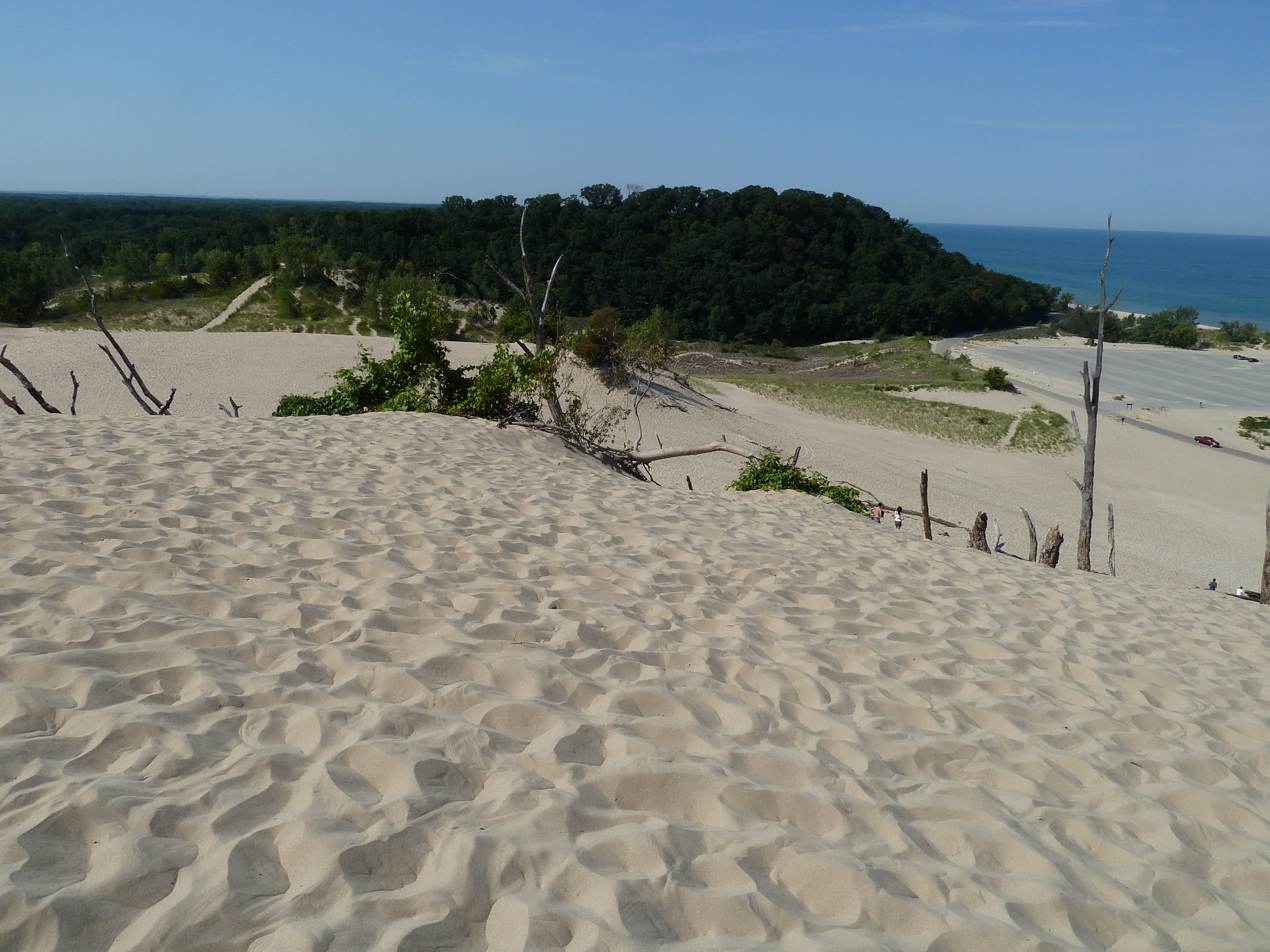
The Edward K. Warren Foundation developed and preserved Warren Dunes State Park

Warren was a prominent citizen of Three Oaks and served at times as treasurer, clerk, and supervisor. Warren was also a philanthropist, establishing the Edward K. Warren Foundation to oversee the management of two 200-acre (81 ha) tracts of forest and beach. These tracts were developed as Warren Dunes State Park, today one of the most popular state parks in Michigan, and Warren Woods State Park. In 1916, Warren founded the Chamberlain Memorial Museum, named after Warren's father-in-law. The museum preserved early farm implements, Native American artifacts, and war memorabilia. The collection was purchased by Michigan State College in 1952.

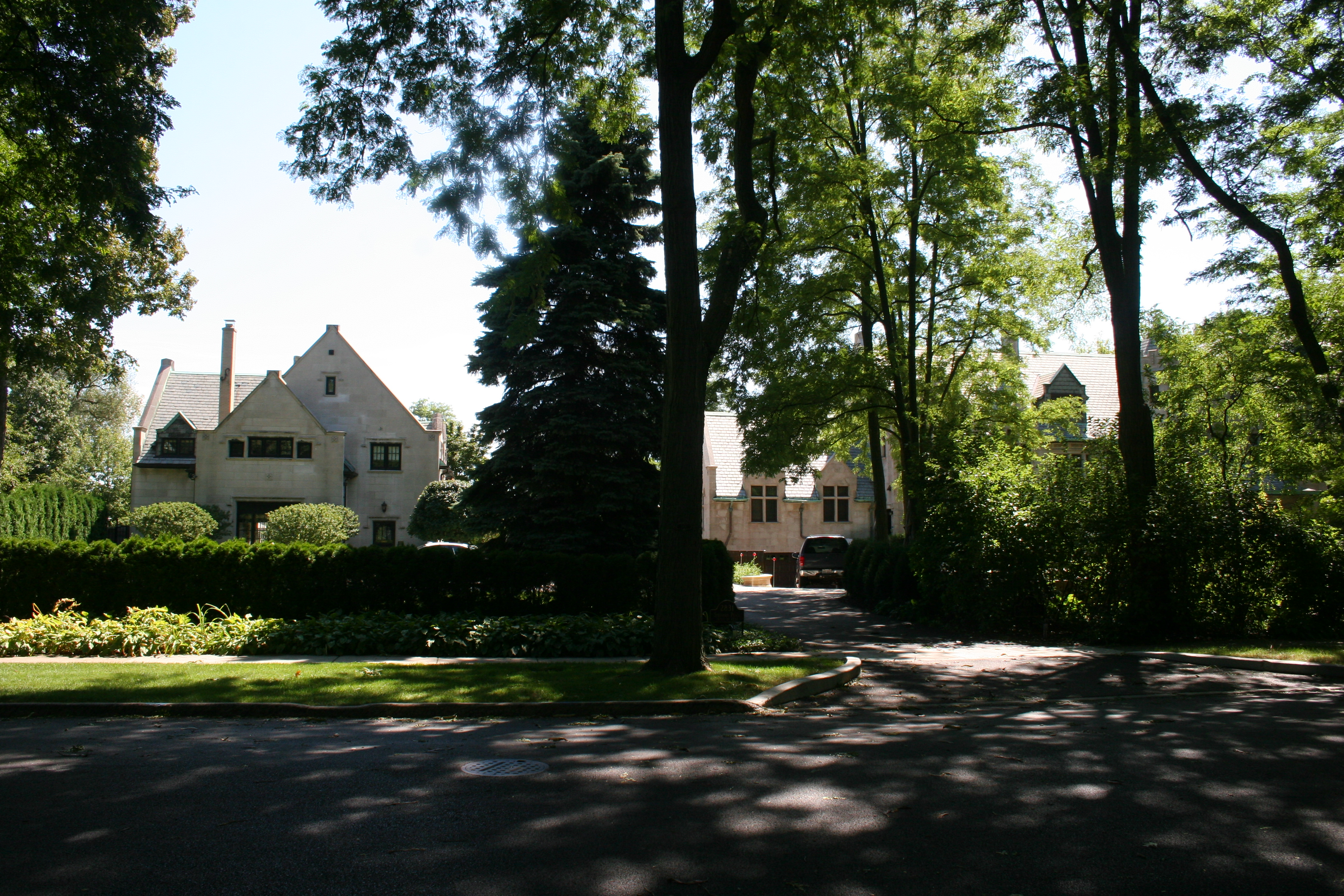
Edward Kirk Warren's home in Evanston, Illinois

Warren's strong Congregationalist convictions guided his personal life. He was a staunch supporter of prohibition, replacing the income that saloons would have brought Three Oaks with money from his own account. Warren was the president of the International Sunday School Association of North America and oversaw the World's Sunday School Convention in 1904 in Jerusalem, Ottoman Empire. He was named president of the International Sunday School Association in 1915. Warren was also a member of the Michigan Historical Society, the Chicago Historical Society, the Wisconsin Archaeological Society, the Union League Club, and the Geographic Society of Chicago. He also owned an operated a 2,000-acre (810 ha) ranch near Three Oaks and a few ranches in Texas, Mexico, and New Mexico. Warren was a supporter of Dwight L. Moody and was named a trustee of the Moody Bible Institute in 1909.

Warren died at his home in Evanston, Illinois, on January 16, 1919. The Warren Featherbone Company Office Building was listed on the National Register of Historic Places by the National Park Service on January 23, 1986. Seven days later, his Evanston house was similarly listed.
