= Edward Kirk Warren House and Garage =

Historic house in Illinois, United States

- U.S. National Register of Historic Places
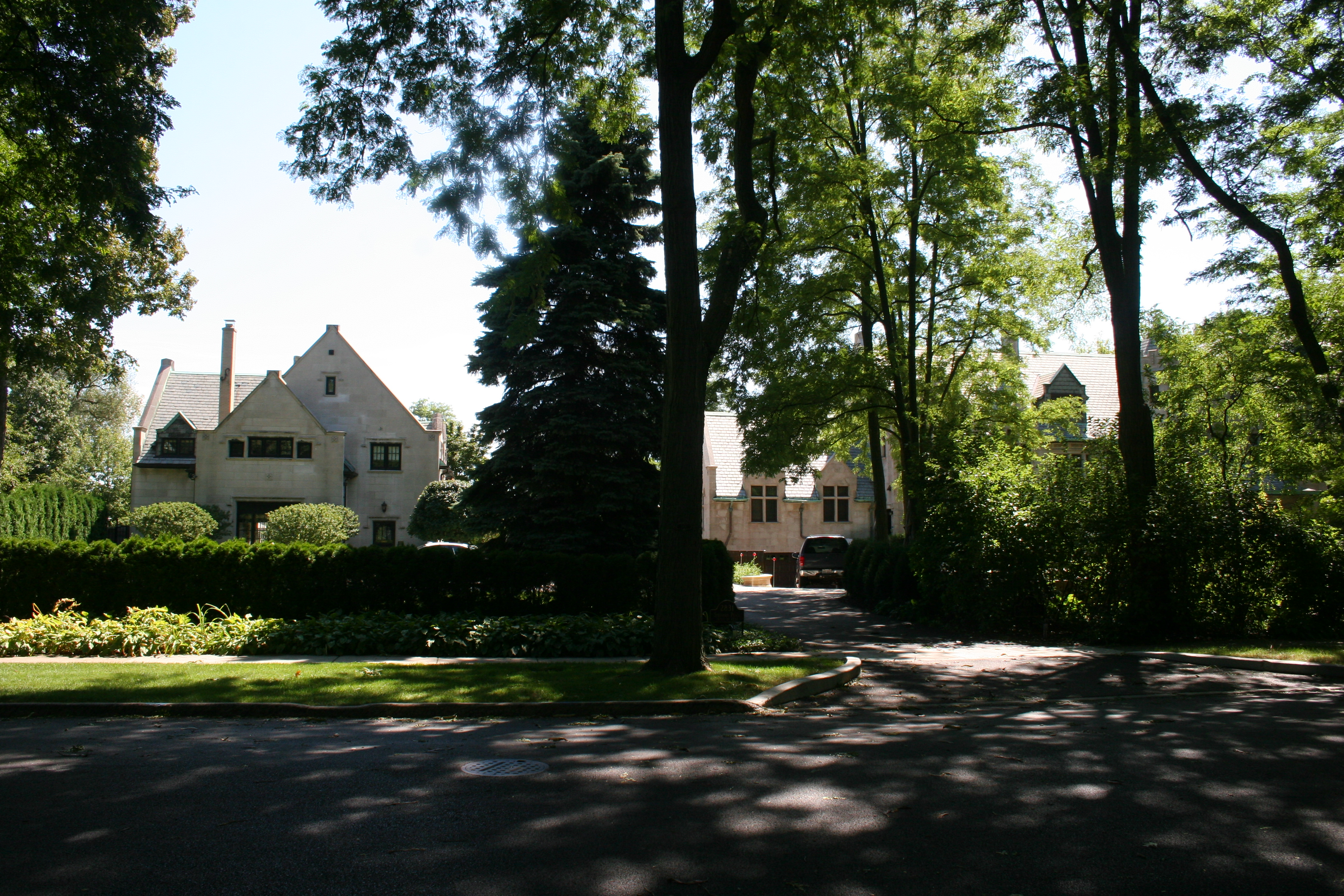

- Location within Illinois Location within the United States
- Location: 2829 and 2831 Sheridan Pl., Evanston, Illinois
- Coordinates: 42°4′10″N 87°40′46″W
- Area: less than one acre
- Built: 1910
- Architect: Zimmerman, William Carbys
- Architectural style: Tudor Revival
- NRHP reference No.: 86000136
- Added to NRHP: January 30, 1986

The Edward Kirk Warren House and Garage is a historic house located at 2829-2831 Sheridan Place in Evanston, Illinois. The house was built in 1910-12 for Edward Kirk Warren, an industrialist who developed the featherbone corset. Warren also served as president of the International Sunday School Association and provided financial support to evangelist Dwight L. Moody. Architect William Carbys Zimmerman, the Illinois State Architect at the time, designed the Tudor Revival house. The house was built from dressed ashlar, an uncommon building material for Tudor Revival houses; it is one of only two ashlar Tudor Revival houses in Evanston. The house's roof has a steep main gable with a parapet along with several smaller gables and dormers with a similar design. The entrance porch is supported by columns and covered by an overhang with bracketed eaves. An octagonal tower with ornamental griffins and a crenellated battlement rises to the left of the entrance. Other decorative features used in the exterior include stained glass, arched windows, and various patterns inlaid in the stone.

The house was added to the National Register of Historic Places on January 30, 1986.
