= René de Bréhant de Galinée =

17th century French missionary in North America

René Bréhant de Galinée
- Born: c. 1645; Rennes, France
- Died: August 16, 1678; Enroute to Rome from France
- Education: Sorbonne

René Bréhant de Galinée was a member of the Society of Saint-Sulpice (Sulpician Order) at Montreal and an explorer and missionary to the Native Americans. In 1670, he and François Dollier de Casson were the first Europeans to make a recorded transit of the Detroit River. His map of the trip demonstrated that the Great Lakes were all connected.

The Galien River in Michigan is named for him.

École secondaire Père-René-de-Galinée French Catholic secondary school in Cambridge, Ontario is named after him.
