= Warren Dunes State Park =

State park in Michigan, United States

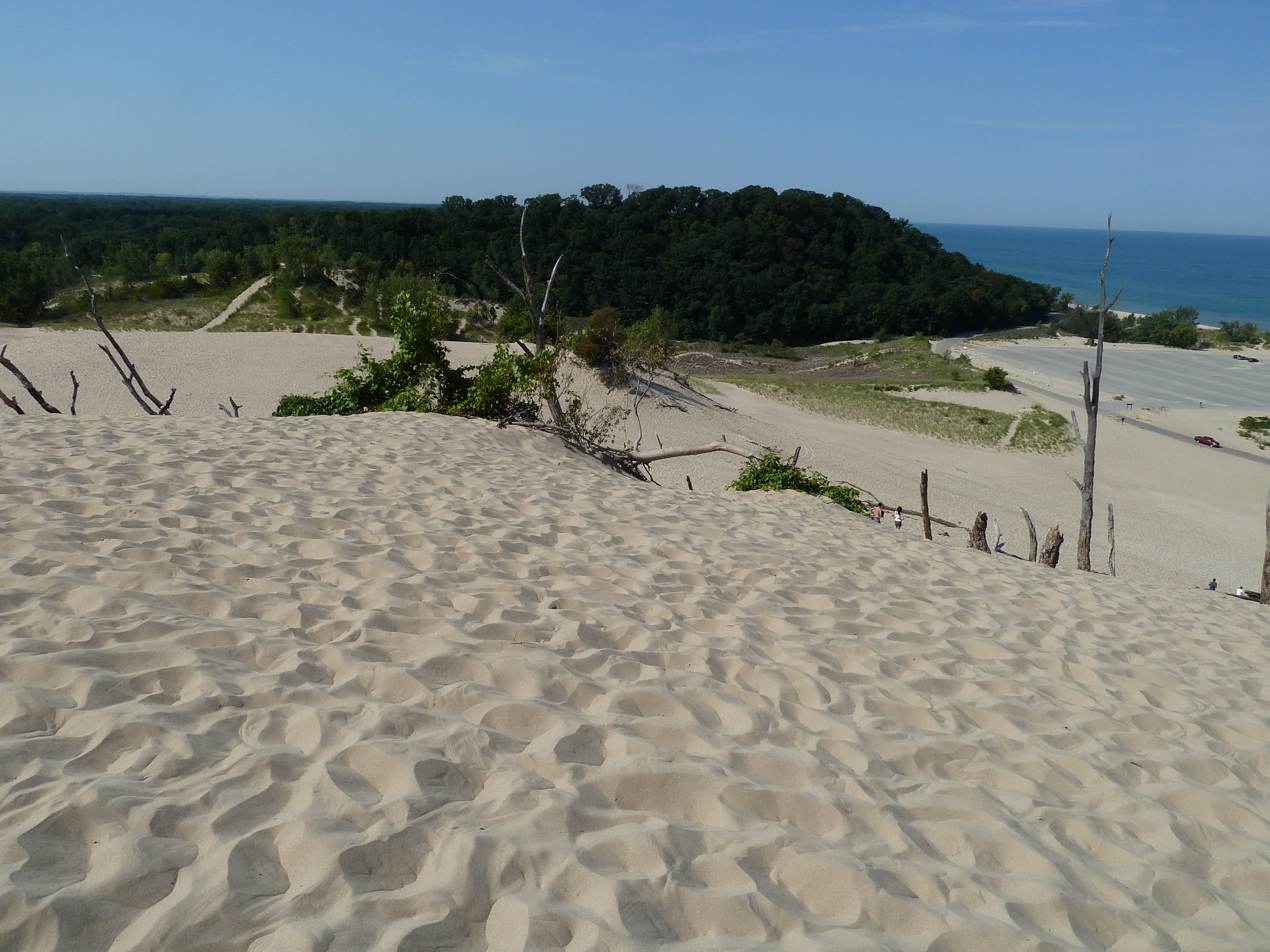

- Location within Michigan Location within the United States
- Location: Lake Township / Sawyer, Berrien County, Michigan
- Nearest city: Bridgman, Michigan
- Coordinates: 41°54′19″N 86°35′58″W
- Area: 1,500 acres (610 ha)
- Elevation: 814 feet (248 m)
- Established: 1930
- Administrator: Michigan Department of Natural Resources
- Website: Official website

Warren Dunes State Park is a 1,500-acre (610 ha) public recreation area located along the eastern shore of Lake Michigan in Berrien County, Michigan. The state park's large sand dunes and lakeshore beaches make it one of the most popular of Michigan's state parks.

Large sand dunes are found throughout the park. Among the park's dunes are Mt. Fuller, Pikes Peak, and Mt. Edwards, with the most significant being Tower Hill, the highest point in the park, which stands 240 feet (73 meters) above the Lake Michigan. Easy access to the dunes make it a popular location to practice the sport of sandboarding. The park offers eight miles of trails, swim beach, beach house, picnicking, playground, two campgrounds (Hilldebrandt Semi-Modern and Mt. Randall Modern), concession store, metal detecting, cross-country skiing, and hunting.

The dunes and beach area were preserved by a local businessman, Edward K. Warren, as a conservation measure. He originally purchased the site as a favor to a friend who had encountered significant financial difficulties. Previous ownership of Tower Dune and surroundings had been by J.S. Pardee in the late 1800s. In 1930, the Warren Dunes area became a Michigan state park.

Tower Hill dune rises 236 feet above the lake

== See also ==
- Grand Mere State Park
- Warren Woods State Park
- Singing sand
