= Blue Jay Creek (Michigan) =

Stream in Berrien County, Michigan, U.S.

Coordinates: 41°50′33″N 86°32′57″W

Blue Jay Creek is a stream in Berrien County, in the U.S. state of Michigan. It is a tributary to the Galien River.

Blue Jay Creek was named for the blue jays often seen there by early settlers.
