= Warren Woods State Park =

Park in Michigan, USA

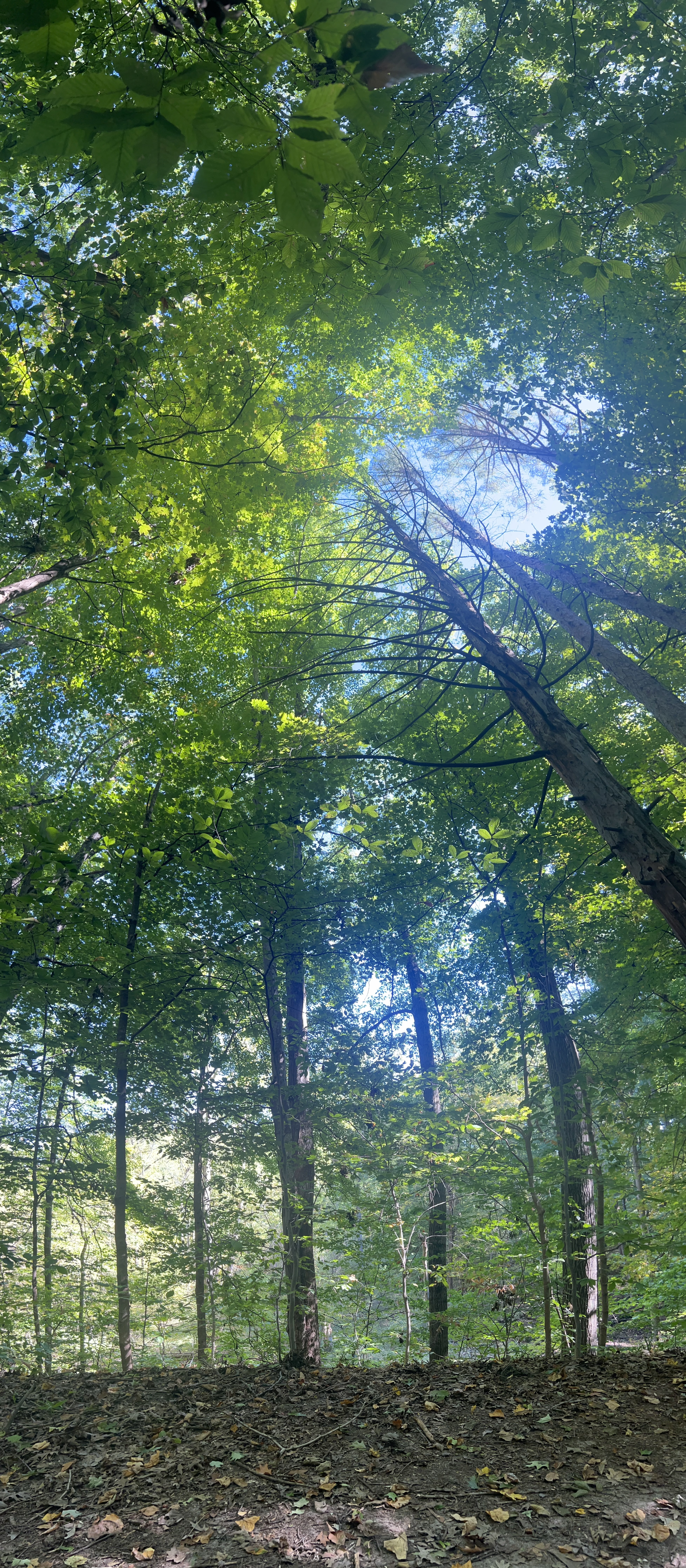

- Location within Michigan Location within the United States
- Location: Chikaming Township, Berrien County, Michigan, United States
- Nearest town: Three Oaks, Michigan
- Coordinates: 41°49′55″N 86°37′30″W
- Area: 311 acres (126 ha)
- Elevation: 597 feet (182 m)
- Established: 1930
- Administrator: Michigan Department of Natural Resources
- Designation: Michigan state park
- Website: Official website

U.S. National Natural Landmark
- Designated: 1967

Warren Woods State Park is a 311-acre (126 ha) nature preserve and public recreation area in Berrien County, Michigan, near the village of Three Oaks. The state park is leased by private owners to the state of Michigan.

== History ==
The woods are named for Edward Kirk Warren (1847-1919), the inventor of the featherbone corset (which replaced the whalebone in corsets with turkey feathers and secured his fortune). Starting in 1879, Warren bought 150 acres (0.61 km^{2}) of the woods and 250 acres (1.0 km^{2}) of the dunes, setting them aside for preservation.

== Natural features ==
The park is home to the last climax beech-maple forest in Michigan, which occupies 200 acres (0.81 km^{2}). The virgin North American beech (Fagus grandifolia) and sugar maple (Acer saccharum) forest has specimens 125 feet (38 m) tall and with girths greater than 5 feet (1.5 m) in diameter. The remaining area in the park consists of floodplain oak-hickory forest. Because of the size and age of the trees, and the rarity of the ecosystem, the area has been designated since 1967 as a National Natural Landmark. Many of the beeches, with their smooth, thin, silver-grey bark, are heavily scarred by hand-carved graffiti, some of it decades old; however, the practice seems to have fallen out of favor in recent years.

== Activities and amenities ==
The park has few facilities and is administered by nearby Warren Dunes State Park. Most visitors come to walk the 3.5 miles (5.6 km) of hiking trails, which run from the northern boundary on Warren Woods Road to a parking area accessed from the southern boundary on Elm Valley Road. In the middle of the park the trail crosses the Galien River on a pedestrian bridge, where there is an interpretive station. The park is adjacent to the 42-acre (17 ha) Warren Woods Ecological Field Station, which is owned and operated by the University of Chicago. Birders cite the park as a particularly good place to spot pileated woodpeckers. Other visitors come to picnic. The park is the subject of ecological studies because, in combination with the ecosystems preserved in nearby Warren Dunes State Park, it completes a progression of ecological seres.
