= Michiana, Michigan =

- Village
- Seal

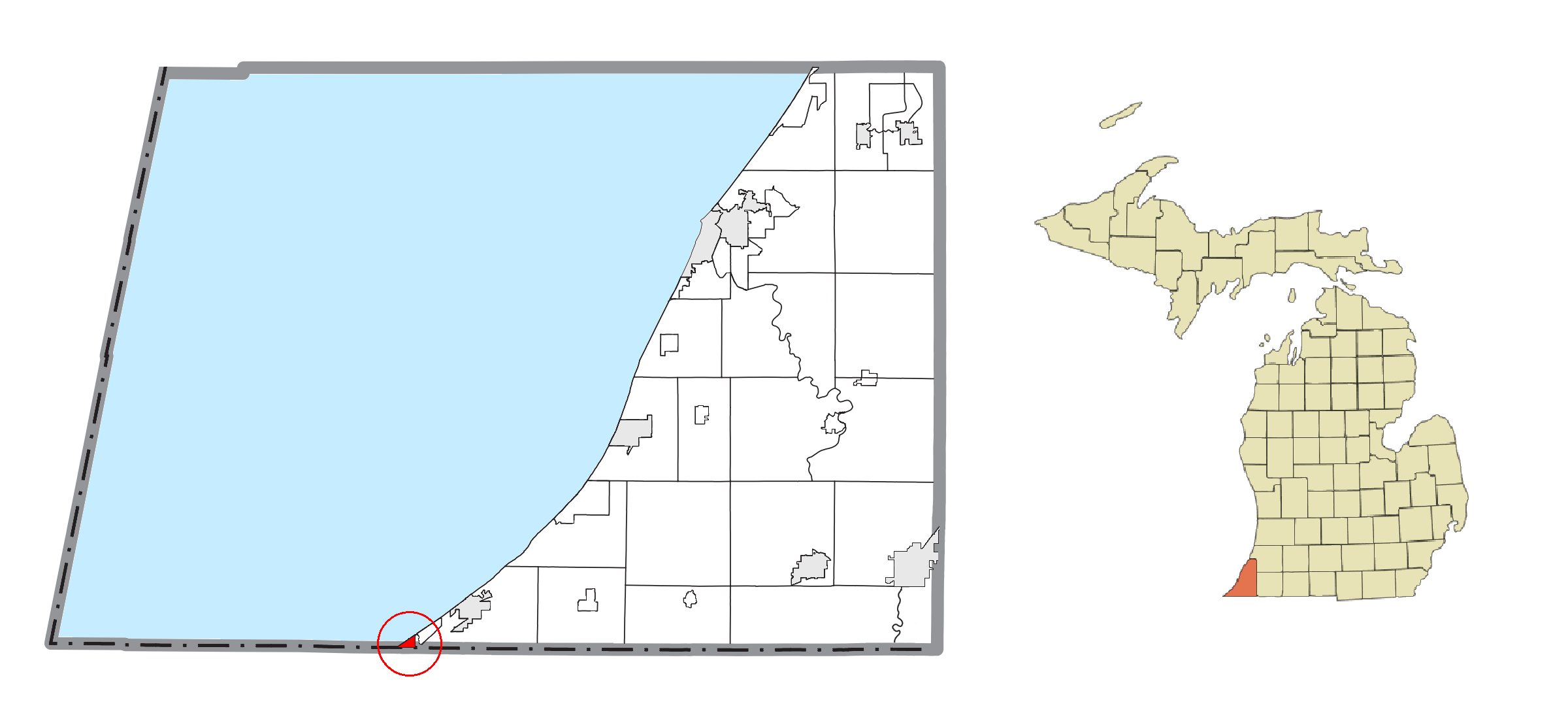
- Location within Berrien County

- Location within the state of Michigan
- Coordinates: 41°45′48″N 86°48′34″W
- Country: United States
- State: Michigan
- County: Berrien
- Township: New Buffalo

Area
  - Total: 0.37 sq mi (0.95 km^{2})
  - Land: 0.37 sq mi (0.95 km^{2})
  - Water: 0 sq mi (0.00 km^{2})
- Elevation: 607 ft (185 m)

Population (2020)
  - Total: 200
  - Density: 547.8/sq mi (211.49/km^{2})
- Time zone: UTC-5 (Eastern (EST))
  - Summer (DST): UTC-4 (EDT)
- ZIP code(s): 49117
- Area code: 269
- FIPS code: 26-53500
- GNIS feature ID: 0632191
- Website: Official website

Michiana (/ˌmɪʃiˈænə/) is a village in New Buffalo Township, Berrien County in the extreme southwest corner of the U.S. state of Michigan. The population was 200 at the 2020 census.

Michiana is also the commonly used term to describe the southwest Michigan and northwest Indiana region, hence the name "Mich-iana".

== Geography ==
According to the United States Census Bureau, the village has a total area of 0.37 square miles (0.96 km^{2}), all land.

== Demographics ==
Historical population
Census	Pop.	Note	%±
1950	102		—
1960	135		32.4%
1970	233		72.6%
1980	333		42.9%
1990	164		−50.8%
2000	200		22.0%
2010	182		−9.0%
2020	200		9.9%
U.S. Decennial Census

Michiana is known for their log homes built in the 1920s. It has been a popular vacation home area for Chicago residents, who are only 67 miles (108 km) away.

Michiana is adjacent to Michiana Shores, Indiana.

=== 2010 census ===
As of the census of 2010, there were 182 people, 105 households, and 58 families living in the village. The population density was 491.9 inhabitants per square mile (189.9/km^{2}). There were 373 housing units at an average density of 1,008.1 per square mile (389.2/km^{2}). The racial makeup of the village was 98.4% White, 1.1% African American, and 0.5% Asian. Hispanic or Latino of any race were 2.7% of the population.

There were 105 households, of which 3.8% had children under the age of 18 living with them, 49.5% were married couples living together, 3.8% had a female householder with no husband present, 1.9% had a male householder with no wife present, and 44.8% were non-families. 39.0% of all households were made up of individuals, and 18.1% had someone living alone who was 65 years of age or older. The average household size was 1.73 and the average family size was 2.21.

The median age in the village was 63 years. 4.9% of residents were under the age of 18; 1% were between the ages of 18 and 24; 7.6% were from 25 to 44; 43.8% were from 45 to 64; and 42.3% were 65 years of age or older. The gender makeup of the village was 49.5% male and 50.5% female.

=== 2000 census ===
As of the census of 2000, there were 200 people, 108 households, and 60 families living in the village. The population density was 512.0 inhabitants per square mile (197.7/km^{2}). There were 360 housing units at an average density of 921.5 per square mile (355.8/km^{2}). The racial makeup of the village was 95.50% White, 4.00% African American, and 0.50% from two or more races. Hispanic or Latino of any race were 0.50% of the population.

There were 108 households, out of which 7.4% had children under the age of 18 living with them, 43.5% were married couples living together, 7.4% had a female householder with no husband present, and 44.4% were non-families. 34.3% of all households were made up of individuals, and 9.3% had someone living alone who was 65 years of age or older. The average household size was 1.85 and the average family size was 2.33.

In the village, the population was spread out, with 7.0% under the age of 18, 1.5% from 18 to 24, 18.5% from 25 to 44, 40.5% from 45 to 64, and 32.5% who were 65 years of age or older. The median age was 55 years. For every 100 females, there were 106.2 males. For every 100 females age 18 and over, there were 106.7 males.

The median income for a household in the village was $75,984, and the median income for a family was $110,991. Males had a median income of $65,500 versus $21,875 for females. The per capita income for the village was $63,558. None of the families and 1.1% of the population were living below the poverty line.
