= Grand Beach, Michigan =

- Village
- logo

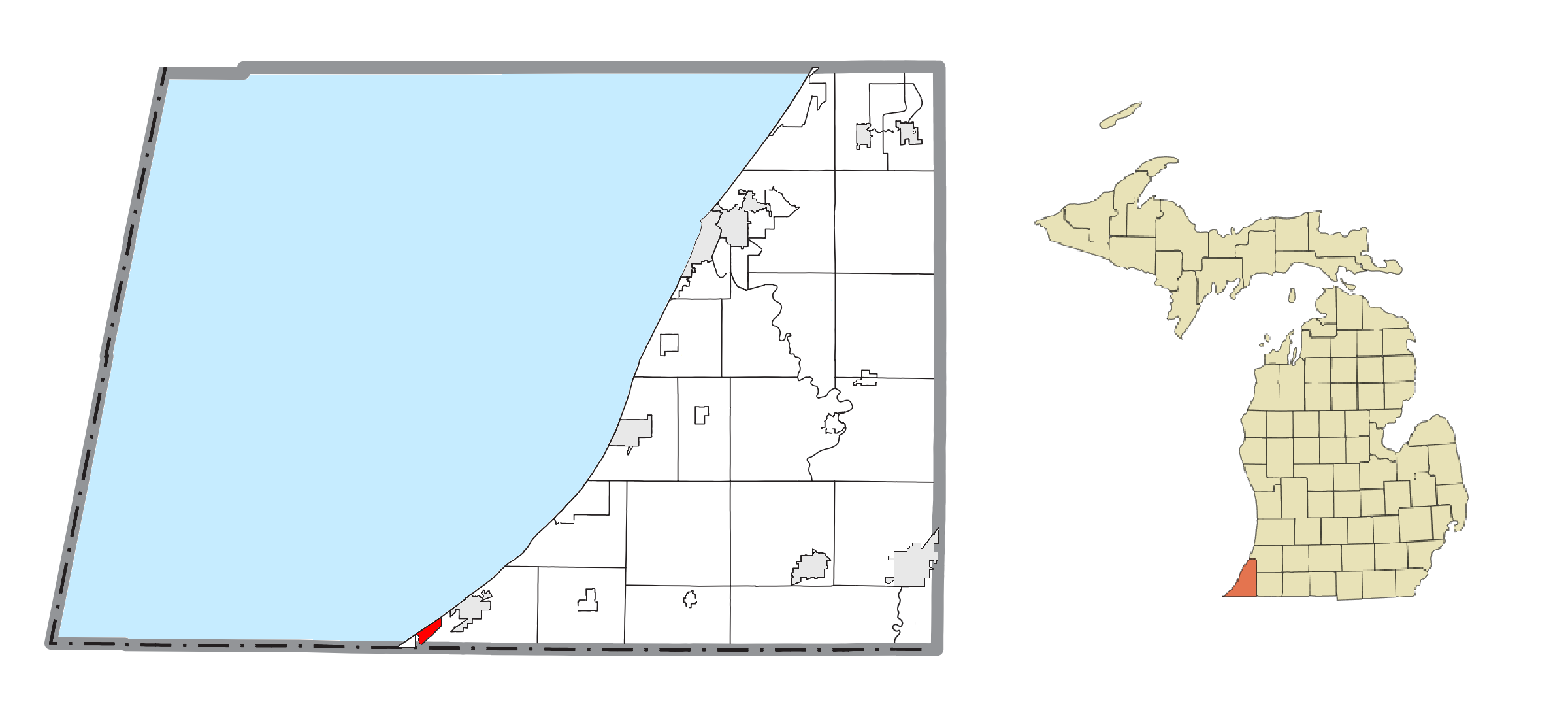
- Location within Berrien County

- Location within the state of Michigan
- Coordinates: 41°46′21″N 86°47′30″W
- Country: United States
- State: Michigan
- County: Berrien
- Township: New Buffalo

Government
  - Type: Village council
  - President: Debbie Lindley

Area
  - Total: 0.91 sq mi (2.35 km^{2})
  - Land: 0.91 sq mi (2.35 km^{2})
  - Water: 0 sq mi (0.00 km^{2})
- Elevation: 620 ft (189 m)

Population (2020)
  - Total: 310
  - Density: 341.1/sq mi (131.71/km^{2})
- Time zone: UTC-5 (Eastern (EST))
  - Summer (DST): UTC-4 (EDT)
- ZIP code(s): 49117
- Area code: 269
- FIPS code: 26-33260
- GNIS feature ID: 0627080
- Website: Official website

Grand Beach is a village in Berrien County in the U.S. state of Michigan. The population was 310 at the 2020 census. The village is within New Buffalo Township on the shore of Lake Michigan near to the Michigan-Indiana border.

== History ==
Grand Beach was founded by the Grand Beach Company around 1903. It was conceived of partially as a short-stay resort. People would take the Michigan Central Railroad to Grand Beach station, rent small cottages for a day or two, eat in the dining hall (located at the corner of Lakeview and Whitewood), and enjoy bathing and golfing. The town was incorporated in 1934 to allow property owners to retain more control.

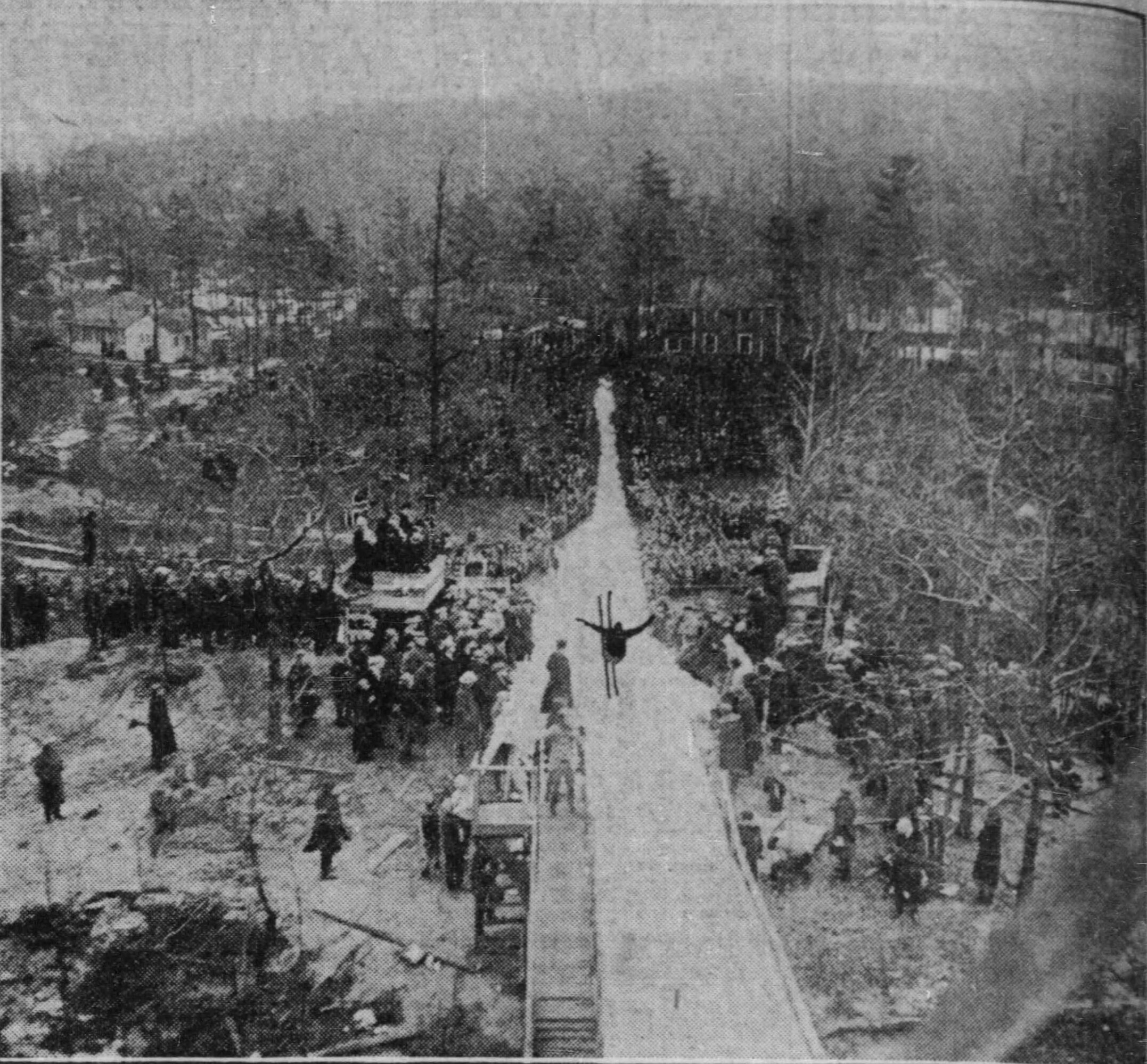
January 1926 ski jump by Anders Haugen at a competition in Grand Beach. The since-lost Golfmore Hotel in Grand Beach held ski jumping events at the time

Its lakeshore beach has always been important to Grand Beach. An entertainment pier was built out into Lake Michigan and offered dining and dancing in the 1920s. The pier has long since disappeared, though its supporting posts are sometimes visible when the lake levels are low. The Golfmore Hotel was built as a luxury hotel just across the creek in Michiana, Michigan. A footbridge over the creek linked the hotel to the pier area. The hotel was an important part of the social life of the beach in the 1920s, even in the winter when it hosted ski jumping events. The hotel burned down on November 19, 1939.

The public golf course has been an integral part of village life at Grand Beach since its establishment. At one time there were 27 holes, but for many decades the course has been a 9-hole course that runs from the club house down to the village gate and back. In the 1950s the village hall moved from the old dining hall structure on the lake to the newly built golf club house / community center.

Lake levels have affected the focus of village social activities. During periods when lake levels were high, beach frontage has sometimes been minimal. Erosion of beachfront properties was especially noticeable in the early 1950s, early 1970s, and late 2010s.

Three Frank Lloyd Wright homes were built in Grand Beach. One of them, the Ernest Vosburgh Summer House (built in 1916) on Ravine Road near Crescent and Royal, still retains much of its original design.

The 1950s brought relative decline as all of Southwest Michigan was bypassed by Chicagoans in favor of more exotic resorts. However, beginning in the 1980s, Grand Beach and nearby New Buffalo have undergone a renaissance as a charming, unpretentious, yet accessible resort area. The former Forest Beach YWCA camp was developed as a gated community with multimillion-dollar homes, thus giving the area a slightly more upscale image.

In recent decades Grand Beach has probably been most famous because of its association with Chicago's Daley family.

== Geography ==
According to the United States Census Bureau, the village has a total area of 0.91 square miles (2.36 km^{2}), all land. Grand Beach is located roughly 73 miles east of Chicago, across Lake Michigan.

== Demographics ==
Historical population
Census	Pop.	Note	%±
1950	105		—
1960	86		−18.1%
1970	165		91.9%
1980	227		37.6%
1990	146		−35.7%
2000	221		51.4%
2010	272		23.1%
2020	310		14.0%
U.S. Decennial Census

=== 2010 census ===
As of the census of 2010, there were 272 people, 133 households, and 84 families living in the village. The population density was 298.9 inhabitants per square mile (115.4/km^{2}). There were 414 housing units at an average density of 454.9 per square mile (175.6/km^{2}). The racial makeup of the village was 100.0% White. Hispanic or Latino of any race were 1.8% of the population.

There were 133 households, of which 15.8% had children under the age of 18 living with them, 57.9% were married couples living together, 3.8% had a female householder with no husband present, 1.5% had a male householder with no wife present, and 36.8% were non-families. 34.6% of all households were made up of individuals, and 21.8% had someone living alone who was 65 years of age or older. The average household size was 2.05 and the average family size was 2.58.

The median age in the village was 60.2 years. 15.8% of residents were under the age of 18; 2.7% were between the ages of 18 and 24; 8% were from 25 to 44; 37.9% were from 45 to 64; and 35.7% were 65 years of age or older. The gender makeup of the village was 48.2% male and 51.8% female.

=== 2000 census ===
As of the census of 2000, there were 221 people, 108 households, and 69 families living in the village. The population density was 257.6 inhabitants per square mile (99.5/km^{2}). There were 340 housing units at an average density of 396.4 per square mile (153.1/km^{2}). The racial makeup of the village was 98.19% White, 1.36% African American, and 0.45% from two or more races.

There were 108 households, out of which 13.9% had children under the age of 18 living with them, 60.2% were married couples living together, 2.8% had a female householder with no husband present, and 36.1% were non-families. 30.6% of all households were made up of individuals, and 16.7% had someone living alone who was 65 years of age or older. The average household size was 2.05 and the average family size was 2.54.

In the village, the population was spread out, with 13.1% under the age of 18, 2.7% from 18 to 24, 14.5% from 25 to 44, 42.5% from 45 to 64, and 27.1% who were 65 years of age or older. The median age was 56 years. For every 100 females, there were 85.7 males. For every 100 females age 18 and over, there were 90.1 males.

The median income for a household in the village was $61,875, and the median income for a family was $103,369. Males had a median income of $86,188 versus $36,875 for females. The per capita income for the village was $51,788. None of the families and 1.8% of the population were living below the poverty line.
