= Union Pier, Michigan =

- Unincorporated community
- Location within the state of Michigan Union Pier (the United States)
- Coordinates: 41°49′41″N 86°41′33″W
- Country: United States
- State: Michigan
- County: Berrien
- Township: Chikaming, New Buffalo
- Elevation: 630 ft (190 m)

Population (2022)
  - Total: 609
- Time zone: UTC-5 (Eastern (EST))
  - Summer (DST): UTC-4 (EDT)
- ZIP code(s): 49129
- Area code: 269
- GNIS feature ID: 1615354

Union Pier is an unincorporated community in Berrien County in the U.S. state of Michigan. It is situated between the Lake Michigan shore and the Galien River about five miles north of the Indiana state border.

The ZIP code is 49129 and the FIPS place code is 81400.

== History ==
During the summer of 1914 a colony of Chicago bohemians, including the writers Sherwood Anderson and Ben Hecht, vacationed at the "Camp's Cottages" (for the owner Eli Camp) on the Union Pier beach. The local residents were outraged by what they believed were the wild goings-on at "The Nudist Club," as they characterized it, particularly after two local men left their wives for women staying at Camp's. The locals made the situation sufficiently uncomfortable for the vacationers that they did not return the next year.

After the end of World War II, many Lithuanian immigrants began settling in Union Pier. Although few Lithuanian-Americans remain today, several Lithuanian facilities remain.

== Education ==
Most children attend New Buffalo Elementary (K-5), Middle (6–8), and High School (9–12), which make up New Buffalo Area Schools. Some attend River Valley School District, which is made up of Chikaming Elementary School (PK-2) in Sawyer, and Three Oaks Elementary (3–5) and River Valley High School (6–12) in Three Oaks, Michigan.
