= Galien River =

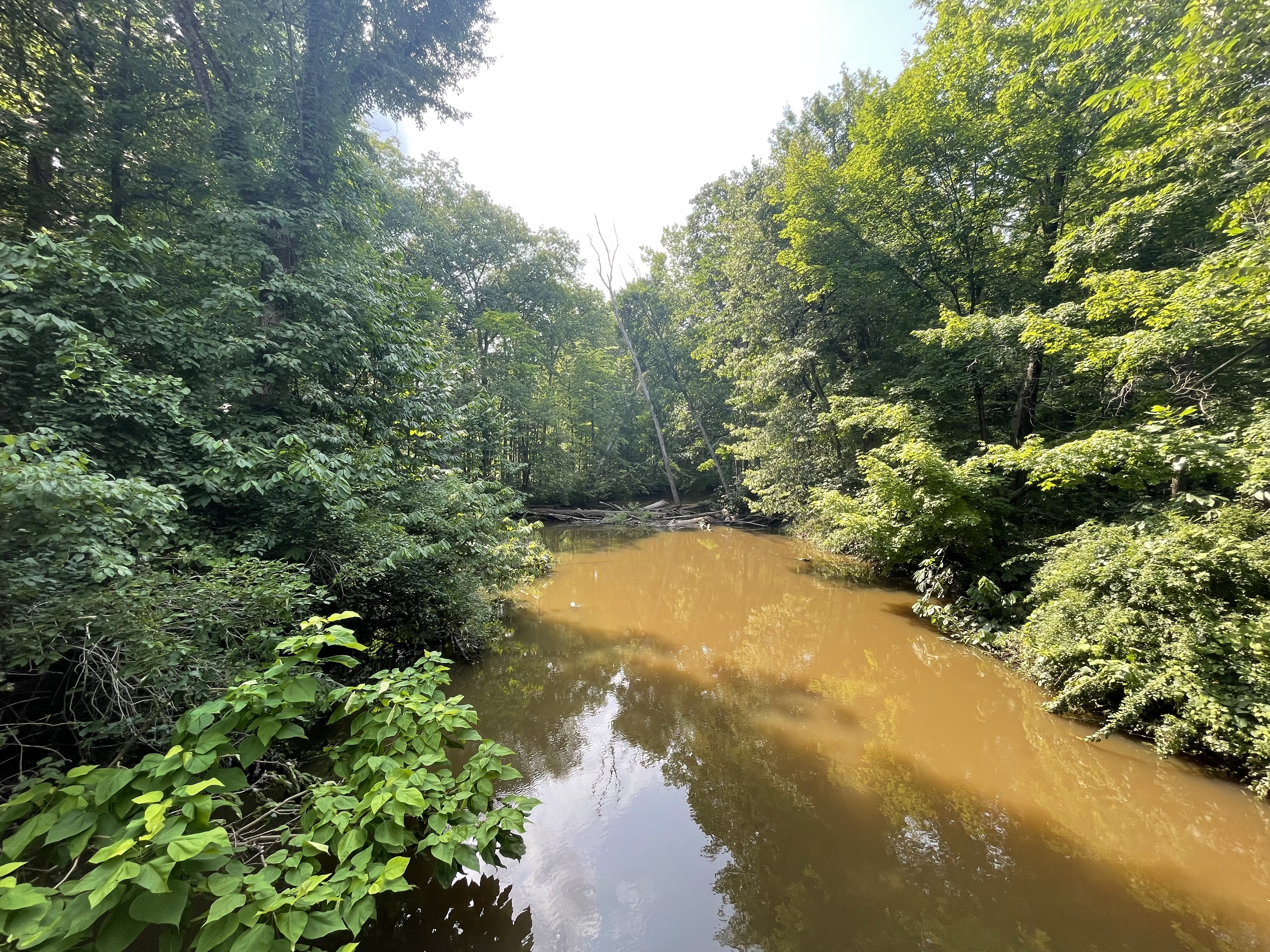
- Galien River looking downstream from Warren Woods State Park trail bridge in August 2023.

Location
- Country: United States
- State: Michigan
- Region: Berrien County

Physical characteristics
- Source: Dayton Lake
  - location: East of Galien, Michigan, Berrien County, Michigan, United States
  - coordinates: 41°47′47″N 086°26′33″W
  - elevation: 720 ft (220 m)
- Mouth: Lake Michigan
  - location: New Buffalo, Berrien County, Michigan
  - coordinates: 41°48′04″N 086°44′57″W
  - elevation: 581 ft (177 m)
- Discharge
  - location: mouth
  - average: 213.53 cu ft/s (6.046 m^{3}/s) (estimate)

Basin features
- Tributaries
  - left: Dowling Creek, South Branch Galien River
  - right: Blue Jay Creek, East Branch Galien River, Kirktown Creek

The Galien River (/ɡɑːˈliːn/ gah-LEEN) is a 30.0-mile-long (48.3 km) stream in the southwest region of the U.S. state of Michigan. The river begins at the outlet of Dayton Lake and flows in a predominantly westerly direction until it enters southeastern Lake Michigan at New Buffalo. The South Branch Galien River rises just north of the border with Indiana, at the confluence of Spring Creek and the Galena River, the latter rising in LaPorte County, Indiana.

== History ==
The river was named after René Bréhant de Galinée, a French missionary, mapmaker and explorer. The name was changed to Galien by legislative action in 1829.

== Ecology ==
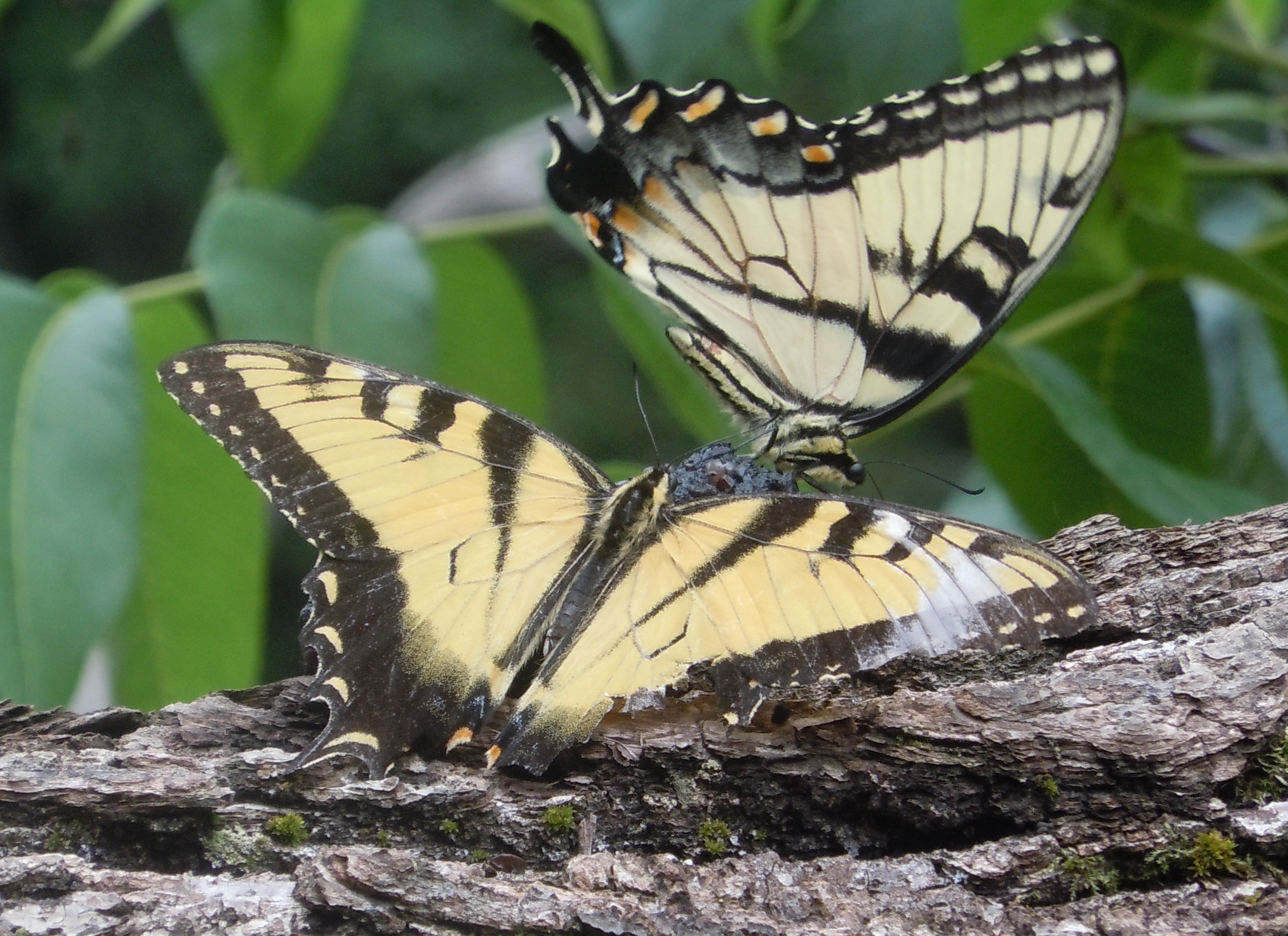
Pair of tiger swallowtails (Papilio glaucus) on logjam in the river.

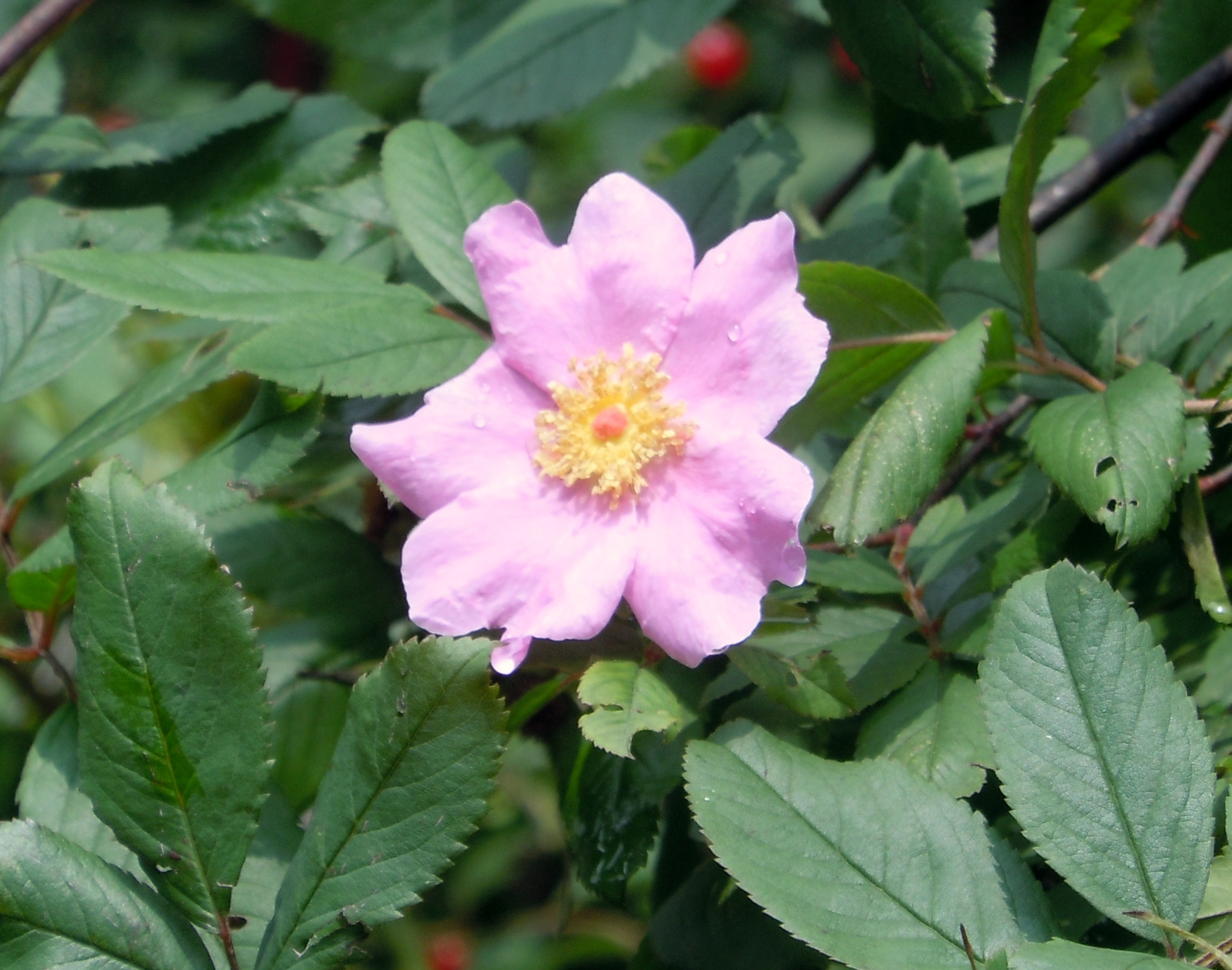
Swamp rose (Rosa palustris) on the bank of the Galien River August 2011.

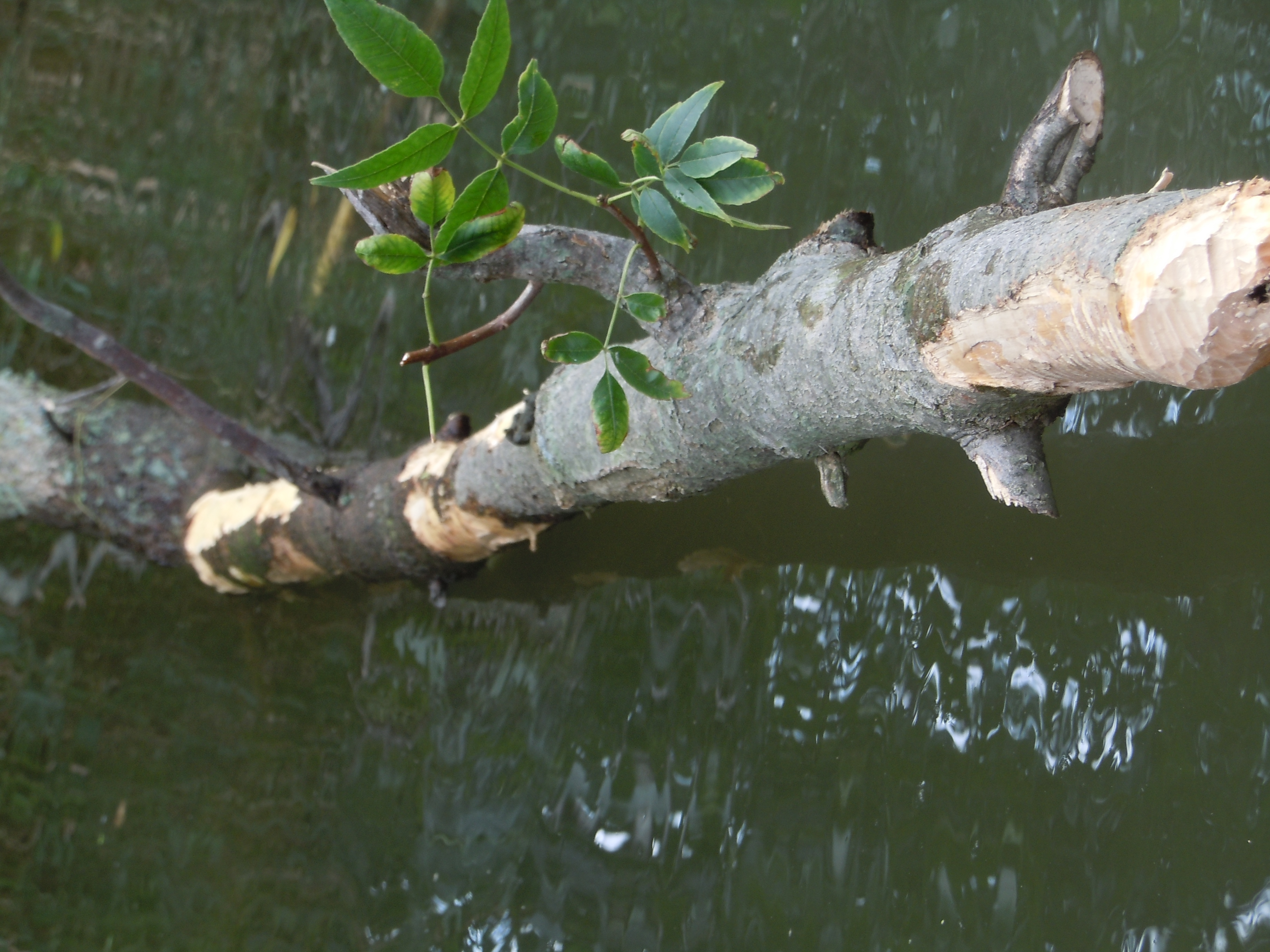
Beaver (Castor canadensis) have returned to the Galien River after being trapped out in the nineteenth century.

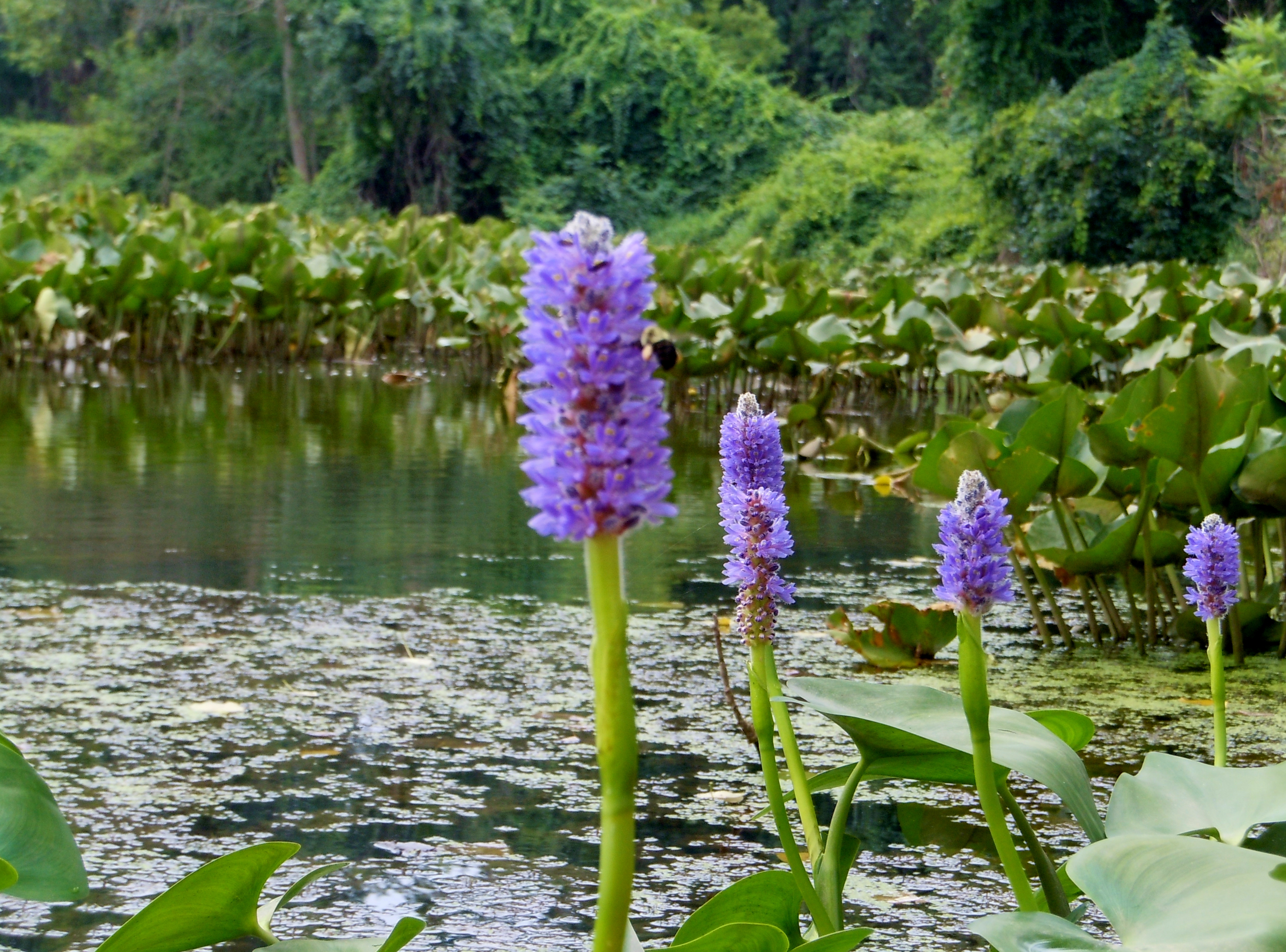
Pickerelweed (Pontederia cordata) on Galien River oxbow August 2011.

The Galien River passes through Warren Woods State Park which supports the last climax beech-maple forest in the state of Michigan. The Galien River watershed supports the state's largest breeding population of yellow-throated warblers (Setophaga dominica), and a substantial population of breeding cerulean warblers (Setophaga cerulea). Also supports a high diversity of bottomland forest obligate bird species.

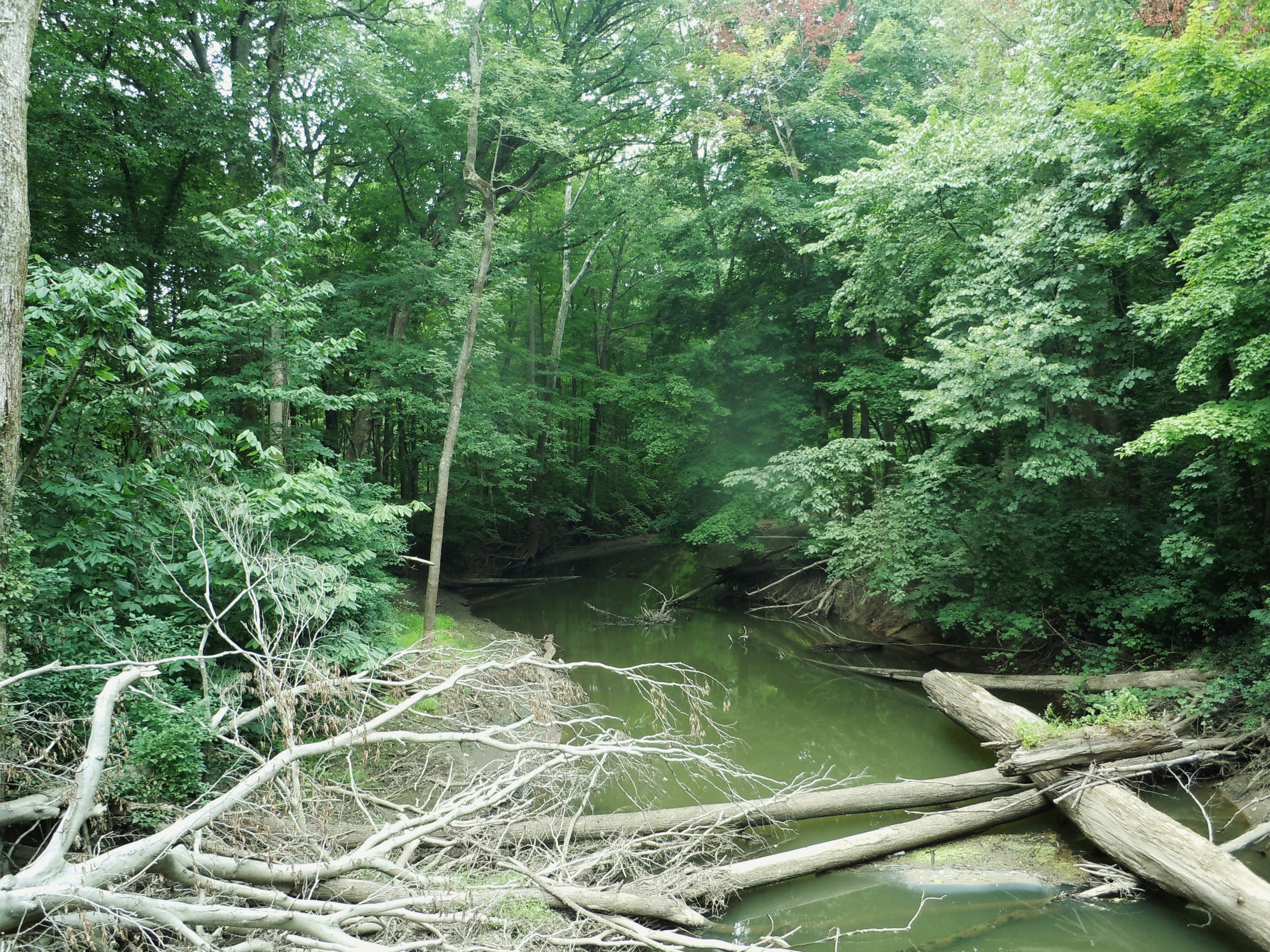
Galien River looking downstream from Warren Woods State Park trail bridge in August 2011.

Designated coldwater streams in the watershed include: the main stem of the Galien River, east branch Galien River, Blue Jay Creek, south branch Galien River, and a portion of Spring Creek.

== Watershed ==
The watershed encompasses approximately 180 square miles (470 km^{2}) in portions of La Porte County, Indiana, and Berrien County, Michigan. The main branch of the Galien rises from the outflow of Dayton Lake in the northwest corner of Bertrand Township and flows west to the village of Galien, Michigan. It then flows northwest into Weesaw Township and north to near New Troy, where it is joined by the East Branch and begins to flow west and then southwest to New Buffalo.

Agriculture is the dominant land use in the watershed and the majority of the water bodies have been dredged or channelized to facilitate the rapid conveyance of water from the relatively flat landscape.

Tributaries (from the mouth):

- South Branch Galien River, rises just north of the stateline with Indiana and flows mostly north until joining the main branch north of New Buffalo
  - Nokmes Creek (as of 2014. Was "Squaw."), rises south of New Buffalo and flows north around the east side of town
  - Blood Run, rises in Springfield Township in LaPorte County, Indiana, and flows north and east
  - Spring Creek, rises in Hudson Township in the northeast corner of LaPorte County, flows north into Galien Township then east into Three Oaks Township and south into the South Branch on the Michigan-Indiana border
  - Galena River, rises in LaPorte County, Indiana, near Springville
- Kirktown Creek, rises in Lake Township and flows mostly south into the main branch west of New Troy
- East Branch Galien River, rises in the northwest corner of Buchanan Township and flows mostly west and south into the main branch southeast of New Troy
  - Judy Lake Drain, rises from the outflow of several lakes in western Buchanan Township
- Blue Jay Creek, rises in southeast Weesaw Township and flows northwest to the main branch in eastern Weesaw
- Dowling Creek, rises on the southern edge of Galien Township, near the Indiana border where LaPorte and St. Jospeph counties meet.
  - Beaverdam Creek, rises in southwest Galien Township.

== See also ==
- Warren Woods State Park
