= Shorewood–Tower Hills–Harbert, Michigan =

- Census-designated place (CDP) & unincorporated communities
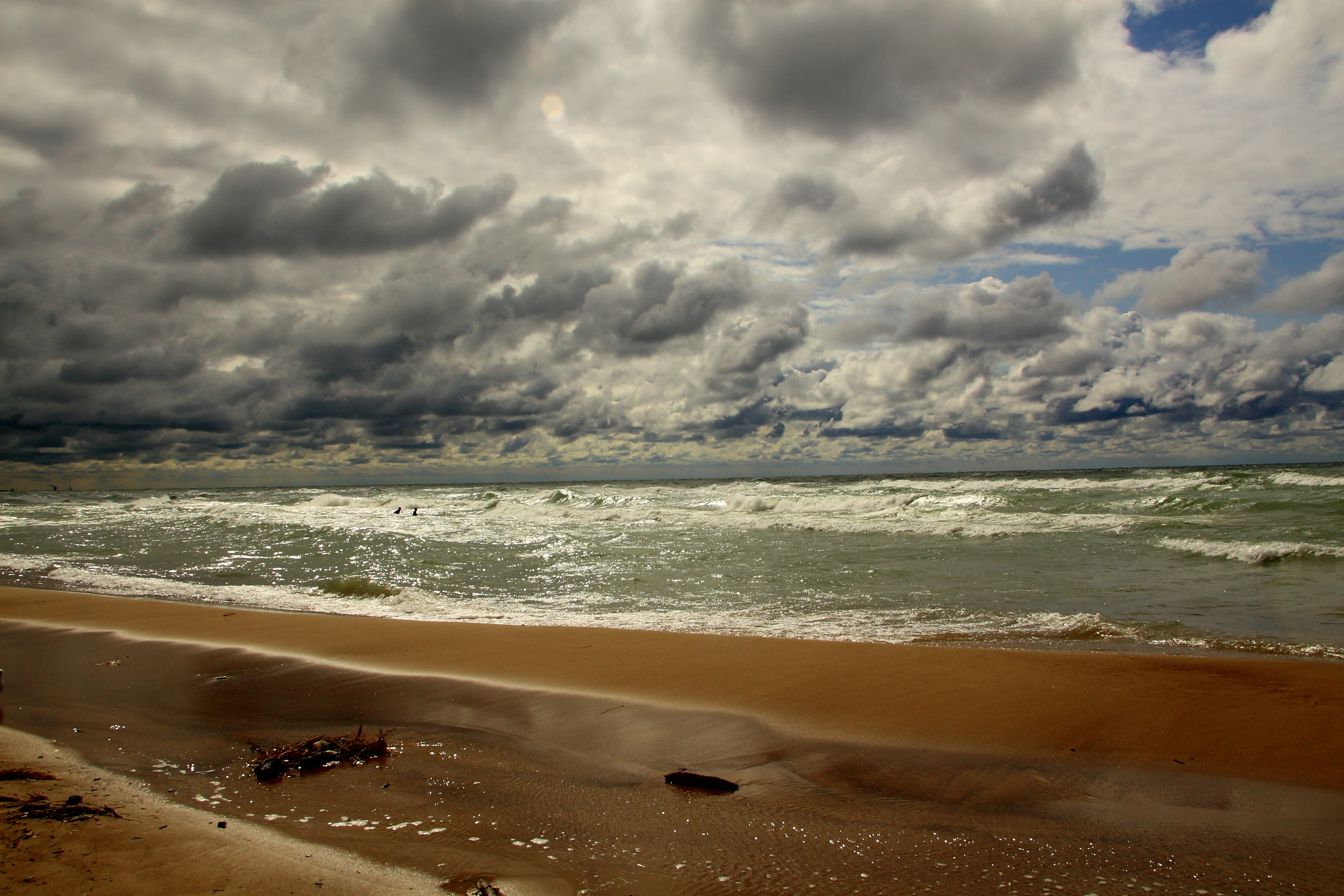
- Lake Michigan from the community of Harbert

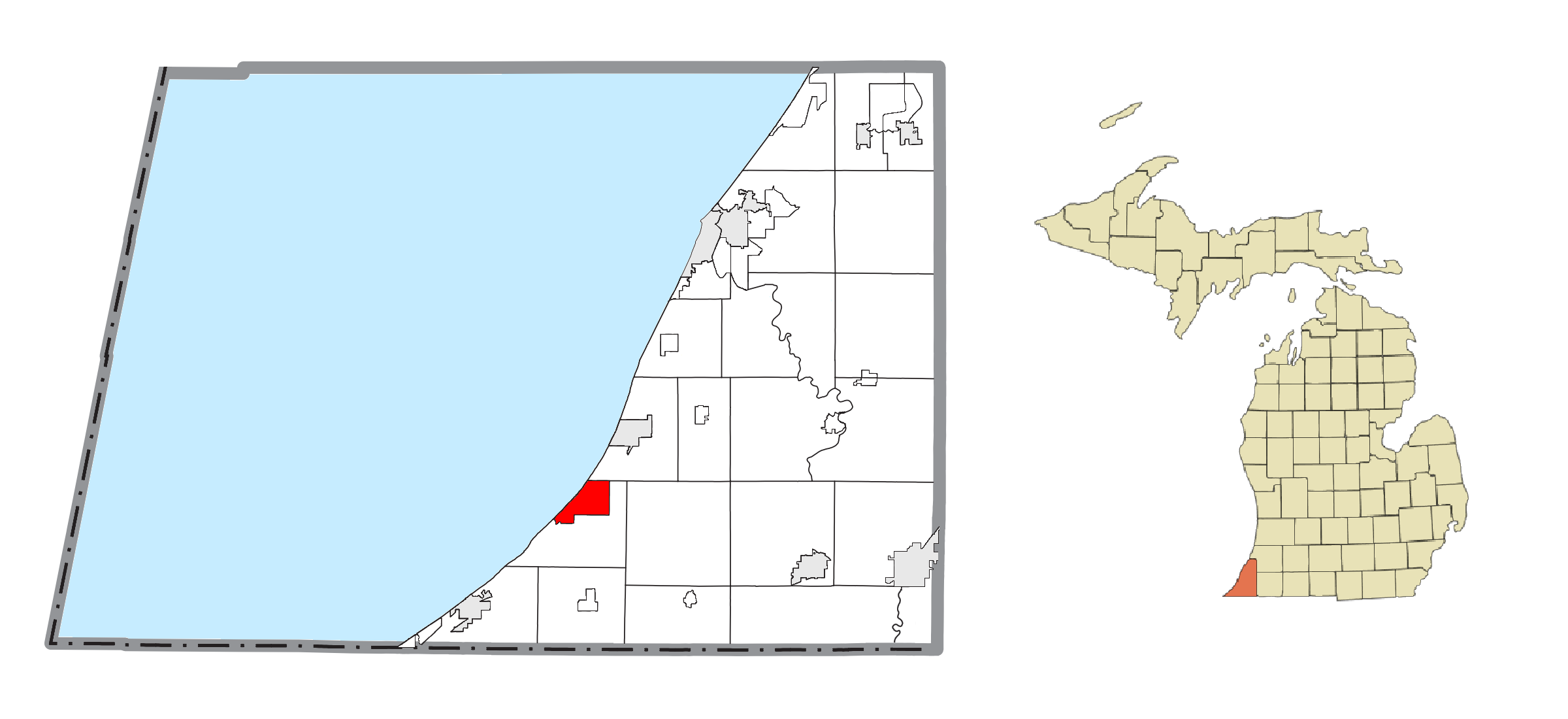
- Location within Berrien County

- Location within the state of Michigan Shorewood–Tower Hills–Harbert (the United States)
- Coordinates: 41°53′11″N 86°37′04″W
- Country: United States
- State: Michigan
- County: Berrien
- Township: Chikaming

Area
  - Total: 4.56 sq mi (11.81 km^{2})
  - Land: 4.53 sq mi (11.72 km^{2})
  - Water: 0.031 sq mi (0.08 km^{2})

Population (2020)
  - Total: 1,249
  - Density: 276.0/sq mi (106.55/km^{2})
- Time zone: UTC-5 (Eastern (EST))
  - Summer (DST): UTC-4 (EDT)
- ZIP code(s): 49115, 49116, 49125, 49128
- Area code: 269
- FIPS code: 26-73730

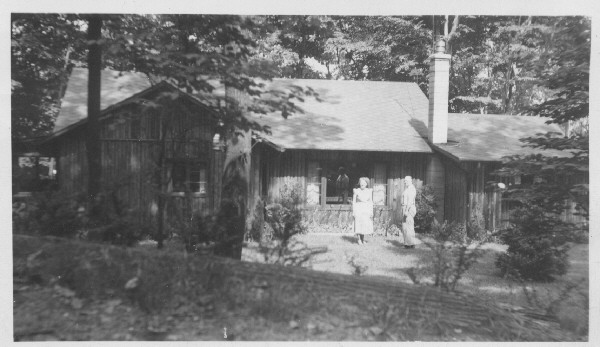
Cottage near Lake Michigan in Shorewood Hills, c. 1950

Shorewood–Tower Hills–Harbert is a census-designated place (CDP) composed of several small unincorporated communities in Chikaming Township of Berrien County in the U.S. state of Michigan. The population was 1,249 at the 2020 census. The CDP is limited to Chikaming Township, although some of the communities extend into southern Lake Township. All of the communities are located either upon or just east of the dunes on the shore of Lake Michigan. Most of the communities lie west of Interstate 94, although the CDP includes a small area east of the freeway up to Sawyer, Michigan. The township is a popular resort destination.

== Communities ==
- Bethany Beach is at 41°53′29″N 86°37′05″W. The FIPS place code is 08040. Bethany Beach is a Christian Swedish community primarily made up of summer cottages and Bethany Beach, a Christian family-oriented lakefront recreation area. It is located on the shore of Lake Michigan. The community was named after Bethany, a place mentioned in the Bible.
- Birchwood is at 41°52′53″N 86°37′43″W. The FIPS place code is 08580.
- Harbert is at 41°52′19″N 86°37′44″W. The ZIP code is 49115 and the FIPS place code is 36440. It was once the home of poet Carl Sandburg.
- Hazelhurst is at 41°52′42″N 86°37′43″W. The FIPS place code is 37395. Hazelhurst Camp is a private cottage community founded and operated by the Prairie Club - a non-profit volunteer organization that was established in Chicago in 1908, to promote outdoor recreation and conservation. The camp includes 94 cottages on 60 acres (24 ha), and over 600 feet (180 m) of Lake Michigan waterfront.
- Sawyer is at 41°53′07″N 86°35′22″W. The ZIP code is 49125 and the FIPS place code is 71760. The elevation is 654 feet (199 m) above sea level. The unincorporated village is named for Silas Sawyer, an early resident.
- Shorewood Hills is at 41°53′45″N 86°36′57″W. The FIPS place code is 73700. Shorewood Hills was first called Bethany Hills Country Club, and started in the early 1920s as a derivative offshoot Swedish summer community from Bethany Beach. It since has developed a core group of homestead residences, but the emphasis is oriented as a second-home beach community along Lake Michigan in the barrier dunes. Besides the beachfront, its other features are its mesophytic forest with four co-dominant species, including both northern hemlock and southern tulip trees, an ample population of trillium seen in spring, and Deer Creek which winds its way through a common ravine area out to the lake.
- Tower Hill Shorelands is at 41°54′06″N 86°36′39″W. The FIPS place code is 80230. Situated between Shorewood Hills and Warren Dunes State Park, this is a small lakefront duneland community.

== Geography ==
According to the United States Census Bureau, the CDP has a total area of 4.6 square miles (11.8 km^{2}), of which 4.5 square miles (11.7 km^{2}) is land and 0.04 square miles (0.1 km^{2}), or 0.71%, is water.

== Demographics ==
Historical population
Census	Pop.	Note	%±
2000	1,619		—
2010	1,344		−17.0%
2020	1,249		−7.1%
U.S. Decennial Census

As of the census of 2000, there were 1,619 people, 725 households, and 484 families residing in the CDP. The population density was 356.9 inhabitants per square mile (137.8/km^{2}). There were 1,519 housing units at an average density of 334.8 per square mile (129.3/km^{2}). The racial makeup of the CDP was 97.10% White, 0.86% Black or African American, 0.31% Native American, 0.25% Asian, 0.06% Pacific Islander, 0.49% from other races, and 0.93% from two or more races. Hispanic or Latino of any race were 1.24% of the population.

There were 725 households, out of which 23.3% had children under the age of 18 living with them, 56.8% were married couples living together, 6.3% had a female householder with no husband present, and 33.2% were non-families. 29.7% of all households were made up of individuals, and 13.5% had someone living alone who was 65 years of age or older. The average household size was 2.23 and the average family size was 2.73.

In the CDP, the population was spread out, with 21.1% under the age of 18, 4.1% from 18 to 24, 22.9% from 25 to 44, 27.5% from 45 to 64, and 24.3% who were 65 years of age or older. The median age was 46 years. For every 100 females, there were 97.9 males. For every 100 females age 18 and over, there were 96.8 males.

The median income for a household in the CDP was $47,708, and the median income for a family was $52,917. Males had a median income of $44,402 versus $25,057 for females. The per capita income for the CDP was $36,219. About 2.6% of families and 4.5% of the population were below the poverty line, including 6.8% of those under age 18 and 3.2% of those age 65 or over.

The median age is 60.5, but the township has a large youth population as well. In the town, white females make a disproportionately low amount of income.
