= New Buffalo, Michigan =

- City
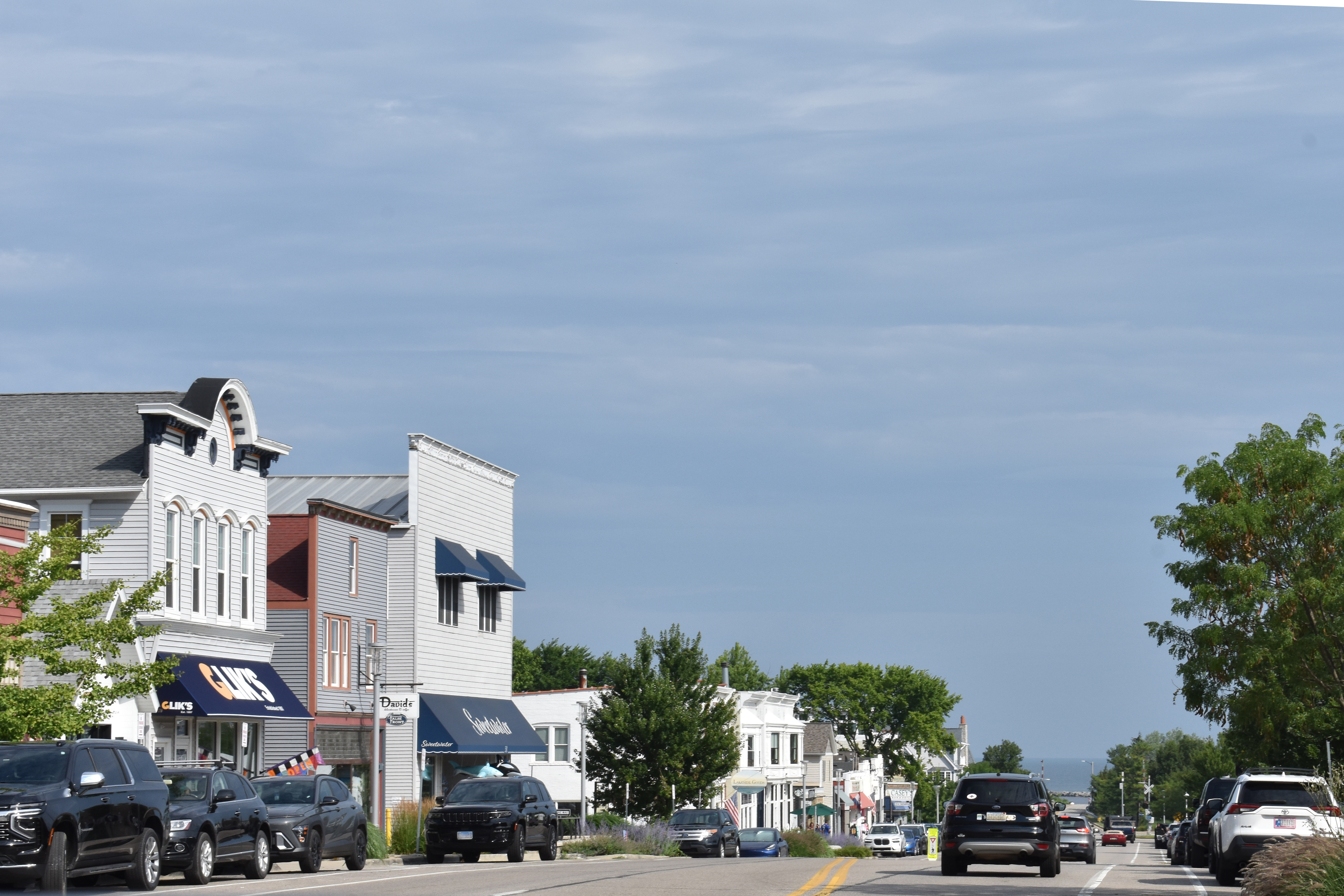
- Looking north along N. Whittaker Street

- Seal

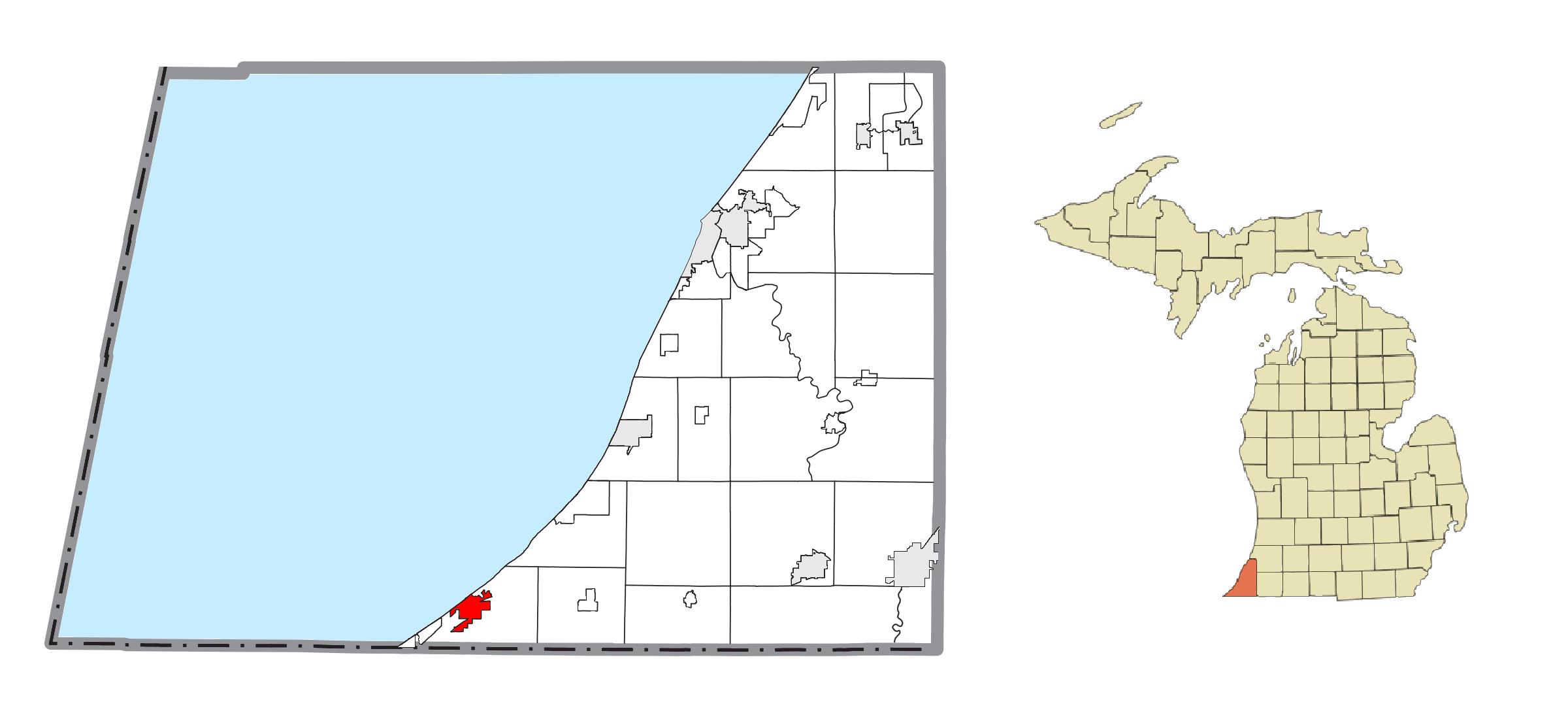
- Location within Berrien County

- Location within the state of Michigan
- Coordinates: 41°47′25″N 86°44′43″W
- Country: United States
- State: Michigan
- County: Berrien
- Incorporated: 1836 (village); 1965 (city)

Government
  - Type: Council–manager
  - Mayor: Vance Price

Area
  - Total: 2.49 sq mi (6.45 km^{2})
  - Land: 2.47 sq mi (6.39 km^{2})
  - Water: 0.023 sq mi (0.06 km^{2}) 1.19%
- Elevation: 640 ft (195 m)

Population (2020)
  - Total: 1,708
  - Density: 692.2/sq mi (267.27/km^{2})
- Time zone: UTC-5 (EST)
  - Summer (DST): UTC-4 (EDT)
- ZIP code(s): 49117
- Area code: 269
- FIPS code: 26-57220
- GNIS feature ID: 0633317
- Website: Official website

New Buffalo is a city in Berrien County in the U.S. state of Michigan. The population was 1,708 during the 2020 census. It is called the "Hamptons of the Midwest".

== History ==
The area around the mouth of the Galien River was originally populated by Miami and Potawatomi peoples. Later, French missionaries visited the area on their search for the fabled Northwest Passage. The area remained sparsely populated, even as Michigan Territory was petitioning for statehood.

In 1834 a sea-captain from Buffalo, New York—Wessel Whittaker—and his crew were shipwrecked on the Lake Michigan coast south of the Galien River outlet. As they headed back to Saint Joseph to report the loss of their ship, Whittaker noticed the possibilities of the New Buffalo area as a potential harbor. He purchased the land around the river-mouth and with various family members in tow, returned and named his new settlement New Buffalo.

Compared to larger harbors along the coast, New Buffalo wasn't a contender initially. However, the new Michigan Central Railway was being built across Michigan in the late 1830s. This new transportation route terminated for several years in New Buffalo, leading to explosive growth. Railway passengers would stop in town to wait for steamers to finish taking them to Chicago, creating a demand for hotels. Unfortunately, the rail line was completed directly to Chicago, which made New Buffalo just another stop along the route. The boom times were over.

As the 19th century progressed, New Buffalo area became a popular vacation getaway spot for Chicagoans. It was easily reached by train and was miles away from the heavy industry of Gary, Indiana and the hustle and bustle of Chicago, Illinois. New Buffalo area also preserved the sand dunes that are common along the Lake Michigan shore. New immigrants came to the city during this time, including many German-Americans.

In the early 20th Century, US Highway 12 was constructed through town, allowing autos to drive there directly. In the mid-20th century, Interstate 94 was constructed just east of town.

== Geography ==
According to the United States Census Bureau, the city has a total area of 2.53 square miles (6.55 km^{2}), of which 2.50 square miles (6.47 km^{2}) is land and 0.03 square miles (0.08 km^{2}) is water. The city is located on Lake Michigan at the mouth of the Galien River. This forms a natural harbor, which is part of the current pleasure-boat harbor drawing summer residents and boaters.

== Demographics ==
Historical population
Census	Pop.	Note	%±
1870	683		—
1880	523		−23.4%
1890	553		5.7%
1900	629		13.7%
1910	528		−16.1%
1920	496		−6.1%
1930	1,051		111.9%
1940	1,190		13.2%
1950	1,565		31.5%
1960	2,128		36.0%
1970	2,784		30.8%
1980	2,821		1.3%
1990	2,317		−17.9%
2000	2,200		−5.0%
2010	1,883		−14.4%
2020	1,708		−9.3%
U.S. Decennial Census

=== 2020 census ===
As of the 2020 census, New Buffalo had a population of 1,708. The median age was 53.7 years. 15.1% of residents were under the age of 18 and 26.1% of residents were 65 years of age or older. For every 100 females there were 98.4 males, and for every 100 females age 18 and over there were 92.8 males age 18 and over.

100.0% of residents lived in urban areas, while 0.0% lived in rural areas.

There were 846 households in New Buffalo, of which 20.0% had children under the age of 18 living in them. Of all households, 37.5% were married-couple households, 24.3% were households with a male householder and no spouse or partner present, and 31.9% were households with a female householder and no spouse or partner present. About 38.8% of all households were made up of individuals and 17.3% had someone living alone who was 65 years of age or older.

There were 1,680 housing units, of which 49.6% were vacant. The homeowner vacancy rate was 1.9% and the rental vacancy rate was 16.1%. 75% of residences are second homes.

Racial composition as of the 2020 census
Race	Number	Percent
White	1,514	88.6%
Black or African American	17	1.0%
American Indian and Alaska Native	9	0.5%
Asian	12	0.7%
Native Hawaiian and Other Pacific Islander	2	0.1%
Some other race	67	3.9%
Two or more races	87	5.1%
Hispanic or Latino (of any race)	114	6.7%

=== 2010 census ===
As of the census of 2010, there were 1,883 people, 881 households, and 497 families living in the city. The population density was 753.2 inhabitants per square mile (290.8/km^{2}). There were 1,692 housing units at an average density of 676.8 per square mile (261.3/km^{2}). The racial makeup of the city was 93.4% White, 1.6% African American, 0.5% Native American, 0.3% Asian, 0.2% Pacific Islander, 2.6% from other races, and 1.3% from two or more races. Hispanic or Latino of any race were 4.4% of the population.

There were 881 households, of which 21.8% had children under the age of 18 living with them, 42.7% were married couples living together, 9.0% had a female householder with no husband present, 4.8% had a male householder with no wife present, and 43.6% were non-families. 38.0% of all households were made up of individuals, and 15.6% had someone living alone who was 65 years of age or older. The average household size was 2.14 and the average family size was 2.80.

The median age in the city was 48.4 years. 17.3% of residents were under the age of 18; 7% were between the ages of 18 and 24; 19.4% were from 25 to 44; 34.9% were from 45 to 64; and 21.3% were 65 years of age or older. The gender makeup of the city was 49.3% male and 50.7% female.

=== 2000 census ===
As of the census of 2000, there were 2,200 people, 947 households, and 603 families living in the city. The population density was 910.4 inhabitants per square mile (351.5/km^{2}). There were 1,426 housing units at an average density of 590.1 per square mile (227.8/km^{2}). The racial makeup of the city was 96.64% White, 0.41% African American, 0.23% Native American, 0.50% Asian, 0.05% Pacific Islander, 1.27% from other races, and 0.91% from two or more races. Hispanic or Latino of any race were 2.86% of the population.

There were 947 households, out of which 24.5% had children under the age of 18 living with them, 49.8% were married couples living together, 9.3% had a female householder with no husband present, and 36.3% were non-families. 30.8% of all households were made up of individuals, and 13.4% had someone living alone who was 65 years of age or older. The average household size was 2.32 and the average family size was 2.89.

In the city, the population was spread out, with 20.8% under the age of 18, 8.3% from 18 to 24, 25.2% from 25 to 44, 27.0% from 45 to 64, and 18.7% who were 65 years of age or older. The median age was 42 years. For every 100 females, there were 98.4 males. For every 100 females age 18 and over, there were 96.4 males.

The median income for a household in the city was $41,658, and the median income for a family was $52,639. Males had a median income of $35,076 versus $22,227 for females. The per capita income for the city was $24,440. About 4.3% of families and 6.2% of the population were below the poverty line, including 9.0% of those under age 18 and 4.3% of those age 65 or over.

== Economy ==
New Buffalo is a popular resort town due to its location along the Lake Michigan shoreline and its proximity to the Chicago Metropolitan Area. As a result, tourism is the primary industry. The town has 1,000 boat slips, galleries, boutique shops, artisan cafes, restaurants with a European flavor, and three golf courses. The Marina Grand Resort is a premier Lake Michigan hotel featuring Scandinavian-style decor.

New Buffalo Beach Lighthouse

Four Winds Casino Resort New Buffalo opened on August 2, 2007, and brought more than 2,000 jobs to the New Buffalo area. The casino includes over 3,000 slot machines and 100 gaming tables. The Four Winds is the main competition for the Blue Chip Casino in Michigan City, Indiana.

== Transportation ==
New Buffalo Harbor

Amtrak, the national passenger rail system, provides three trains per day at the New Buffalo station, with the Blue Water and Wolverine. CSX Transportation provides freight service to the city.

US 12 and I-94 provide freeway access to Detroit and Chicago.

A harbor, both natural and man made, is present at the mouth of the Galien River. This harbor is used by pleasure boats and is accessible to all Lake Michigan ports and beyond, but has little to no commercial traffic other than the occasional charter sailboat.

== Education ==
The New Buffalo Area Schools system is composed of an elementary school, a joined middle/high school, and a STEAM building. The New Buffalo Middle/High School, located off of Clay Street, was built in 2001. It has a performing arts center, multiple baseball/softball fields, indoor and outdoor running tracks, and is designed symmetrically for the middle and high school sections. The elementary school's gym was also rebuilt. An addition to the athletic wing completed in 2010 included a brand new two-story weight room and auxiliary gymnasium.

New Buffalo High School students run WNBI LP 107.9 New Buffalo High School owns the radio station. This allows students to report to the community about current issues.

In 2023, New Buffalo Area Schools completed the construction of the STEAM (Science, Technology, Engineering, Arts, & Mathematics) building located on the other side of Clay street. This facility allows students to access both metallurgy and woodworking machines used by professionals. This facility displays New Buffalo Schools commitment to being a leader in engineering projects in southwest Michigan.

In 2026, New Buffalo Middle/High School was the lone recipient of the Michigan Green Ribbon School Award given by the Michigan Department of Education. New Buffalo Area Schools are made notable by allowing student access to engineering and environmental projects year round.

The New Buffalo High School Bison compete in the BCS Conference in sports. The 1963 Boys Basketball team won the Class C State title, and the Boys Baseball team won the Class D State title in 1983 and 1995. The 1999 Boys Cross Country team won the Class D State title, and the 2005 Boys Baseball team won the Division IV State title.

== Notable people ==
- Roger Brown, Chicago Painter
- Laurent Novikoff, Ballet Master
- Dennis Farina, Actor
- Roger Ebert, Film Critic
- Richard Roeper, Film Critic
- James L. Ziemer, former Harley-Davidson CEO
- Ronnie James Dio, Singer
- Rod Wood, former Detroit Lions CEO
