= Albin =

Albin may refer to:

== Places ==
- Albin, Wyoming, US
- Albin Township, Brown County, Minnesota, US
- Albin, Virginia, US

== People ==
- Albin (given name), origin of the name and people with the first name "Albin"
- Albin (surname)

Mononyms

- Albin of Brechin (died 1269), Scottish bishop
- Albin (rapper), real name Albin Johnsén, Swedish rapper
- Albin (singer), mononym of Albin Sandqvist, Swedish electronic and dance pop singer

== Other ==
- Albin (meteorite), found in 1915 in Laramie County, Wyoming, United States
- Albin Countergambit, a chess opening
- Albin Polasek Museum and Sculpture Gardens, founded in 1961, located in Winter Park, Florida, US
- Albin Vega, a brand of yacht designed in Sweden
- Per Albin Line, folkloric name of a 500 kilometer long line of light fortifications erected during World War II around the coast of southern Sweden
- Brfxxccxxmnpcccclllmmnprxvclmnckssqlbb11116 (purportedly pronounced as 'Albin'), the intended given name of Albin Gustaf Tarzan Hallin, son of Lasse Diding
- Albin, a character in La Cage aux Folles (play) and its derivative works

== See also ==
- Albinson (disambiguation)
