= List of United States post office murals in Michigan =

Following is a list of United States post office murals created in Michigan between 1934 and 1943.

Location	Mural title	Image	Artist	Date	Notes	NRHP listed
Alma	Harvest		Joseph H. Cox	1940	oil on canvas	
Belding	Belding Brothers and Their Silk Industry		Marvin Beerbohm	1943		
Birmingham	The Pioneering Society's Picnic		Carlos Lopez	1942	Building now houses private offices with mural on display.	
Blissfield	Laying the Erie and Kalamazoo Railroad		Jean Paul Slusser	1938		
Bronson	Harvest		Arthur Getz	1941		
Buchanan	Production		Gertrude Goodrich	1941	was painted over, but is being restored	
Calumet	Copper Mining in Calumet		Joe Lasker	1941		
Caro	Mail on the Farm		David Fredenthal	1941		
Chelsea	The Way of Life		George Fisher	1938	moved to new post office building in August 2009	
Clare	The Mail Arrives in Clare		Allan Thomas	1937	oil on canvas	
Crystal Falls	Extending the Frontier in Northwest Territory		Allan Thomas	1938	oil on canvas	
Dearborn	Ten Eyck’s Tavern on Chicago Road		Rainey Bennett	1938	oil on canvas, on display at the Henry Ford Community College Library	
Detroit	Automobile Industry		William Gropper	1941	oil on fiberboard, on display in the student center at Wayne State University	
East Lansing	America's First Agricultural College		Henry Bernstein	1938	on display at Michigan State University's Main Library	
Eastpointe	Early Settlers		Frank Cassara	1940		
Eaton Rapids	Industry and Agriculture		Boris Mestchersky	1938	oil on canvas	
Frankfort	On Board the Ferry Car (Ann Arbor #4, Feb. 14, 1923)		Henry Bernstein	1941		1989
Grand Ledge	Waiting for the Mail		James Calder	1939	winner of the 48-State Mural Competition	
Grayling	The Lumber Camp		Robert Lepper	1939	oil on canvas, depicts lumberjacks, sawing through timber; stacks of logs, logging equipment, workhorses, locomotive, and Native American's observing the process	
Greenville	Lumbering		Charles W. Thwaite	1940	oil on canvas	
Hamtramck	Products of Industry and Agriculture		Schomer Lichtner	1940	oil on canvas	
Hamtramck	Farm Family		Schomer Lichtner	1940	oil on canvas	
Hamtramck	City Workers		Schomer Lichtner	1940	oil on canvas	
Howell	Rural Delivery		Jaroslaw Brozik	1941	oil on canvas	
Iron Mountain	Historic Treatment of Mail Transportation in the West		Vladimir Rouseff	1935	five oil on canvas panels	
Iron River	Paul Bunyan Straightening Out the Round River'		Milton Horn	July 16, 1941	wood carved relief	
Marquette	Marquette Exploring Shores of Lake Superior		Dewey Albinson	1938	on display at the Marquette US Post Office and Federal Courthouse	
Midland	Fabricating Steel		Henry Bernstein	1942	relocated to the Midland County Services Building in 1989	
Paw Paw	Bounty		Carlos Lopez	1940		
Plymouth	Plymouth Trail		Carlos Lopez	1938		
Rockford	Among the Furrows		Pierre Bourdelle	1940		
Rogers City	Harbor at Rogers City		James Calder	1941	oil on canvas	
St. Clair	St. Clair River		James Calder	1938		
Wayne	Landscape Near Wayne – 1875		Algot Stenbery	1939	Missing	
