= McCoy Creek =

McCoy Creek may refer to:

- McCoy Creek (Michigan), a tributary of the St. Joseph River
- McCoy Creek (Missouri), a stream
