= Albihn =

Albihn is a surname. Notable people with the surname include:

- Claes Albihn (born 1971), Swedish athlete
- Ernst Albihn (1892–1944), Swedish merchant, football player, and referee
- Ture Albihn (fl. 2010s), Swedish footballer

== See also ==
- Albin (surname)
