= Sandqvist =

Sandqvist is a Swedish surname. Notable people with the surname include:

- Albin Sandqvist, Swedish singer also known by the mononym Albin
- Alf Sandqvist (born 1945), Swedish Army major general
- Jonas Sandqvist (born 1981), Swedish footballer
