= Collecting Sunlight =

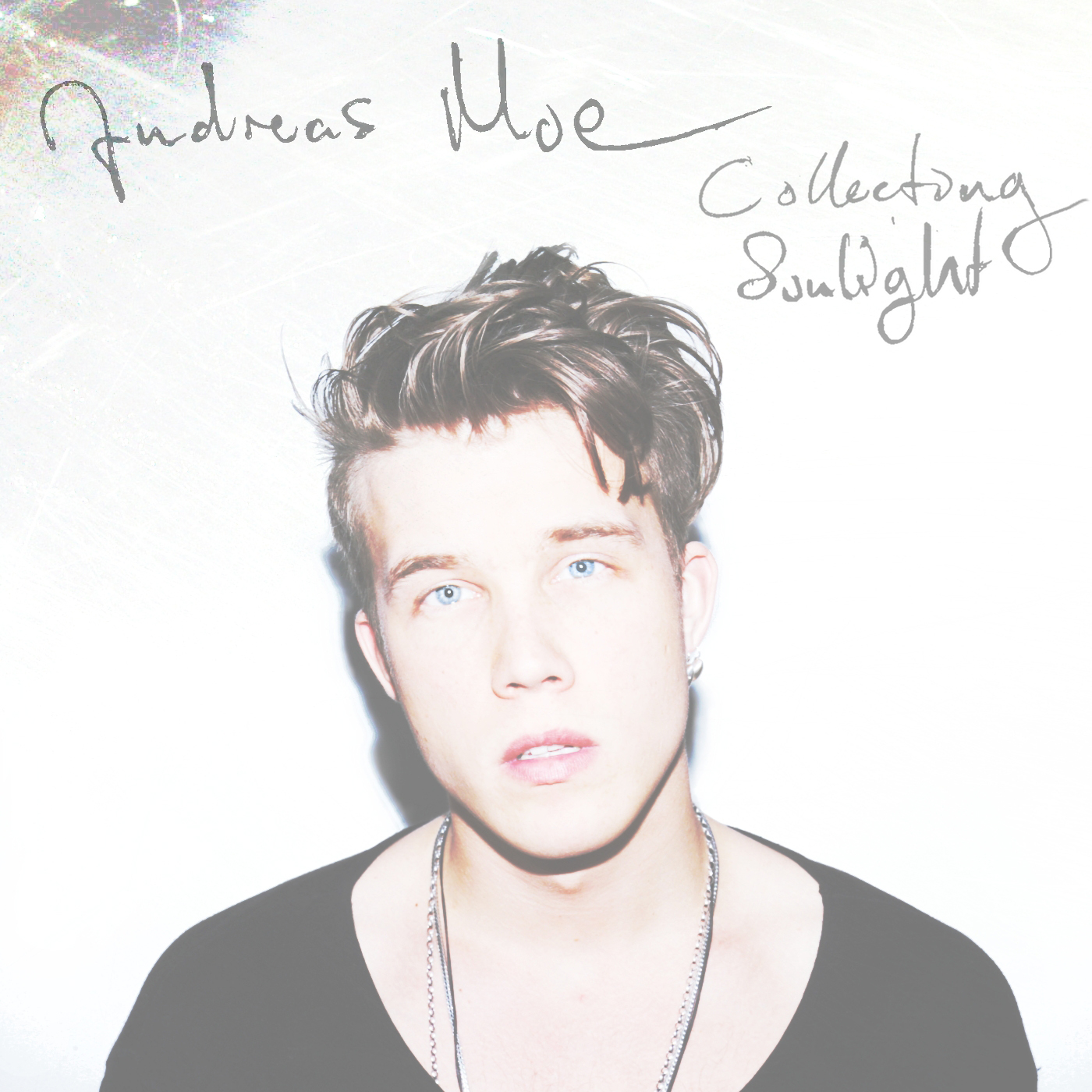

EP by Andreas Moe
- Released: June 25, 2012 (Worldwide)
- Recorded: January 2011–February 2012
- Genres: Pop, electro, acoustic
- Length: 22:54
- Label: Sony Music Sweden (SWE)
- Producers: Andreas Moe, Niclas Lundin, Maria Marcus

Collecting Sunlight is the first EP from Swedish artist Andreas Moe. It was self-released in the UK on June 25, 2012, and received a wider release from Sony Music Sweden on the same date. The EP was highly anticipated worldwide, receiving rave reviews from music bloggers.

== History ==
Collecting Sunlight - EP came when following break up's with each of their long term girlfriends, Andreas Moe and best friend Micael Paavilainen (videographer and creator of most of Moe's videos to date) moved together to the small Swedish town of Saltsjobaden in Winter 2011. Moe recalls it as a time of 'darkness, heartbreak and hibernation'—and reveals that it was only then that he found himself ready to channel his personal experiences into his music.

Having tried for years previous—it was only through heartbreak and solitude that Moe truly felt that he was beginning to develop 'his sound'. He admits that it was a painful process, and states that to explore his experiences while they were still so raw meant involving three writers and friends that he held close to his heart—Hiten Bharadia, Niclas Lundin and Maria Marcus. The foursome spent just two weeks writing and producing intensively—the result of which were the bare bones of The Collecting Sunlight EP.

Moe describes the final product as 'a true souvenir of his journey back to self'—and the sound as a fusion of electronic and organic sounds. The record was released on June 25, 2012.

== Track listing ==
Collecting Sunlight EP
No.	Title	Length
1.	"Collecting Sunlight" - written by Andreas Moe, Hiten Bharadia, Niclas Lundin, Maria Marcus"	3:39
2.	"My Side of the Bed" - written by Andreas Moe, Hiten Bharadia, Niclas Lundin, Maria Marcus"	3:21
3.	"Stay So We Stay Us" - written by Andreas Moe, Hiten Bharadia"	3:59
4.	"Half a Heart of Love" - written by Andreas Moe, Hiten Bharadia, Niclas Lundin, Maria Marcus"	5:22
5.	"Snow" - written by Andreas Moe, Hiten Bharadia, Niclas Lundin, Maria Marcus"	5:29

Bonus track
No.	Title	Length
6.	"Long Time (acoustic)" - written by Andreas Moe, Björn Johnsson"	5:24

== Reception ==
So far, the Collecting Sunlight EP has been received well worldwide, with several popular online blogs posting reviews and articles about the forthcoming release. Most notable perhaps, is famous US blogger Arjan Writes, who wrote '"Moe simply makes enchanting, emotionally honest pop music that is positioned right on the intersection of happiness and heartbreak." Other fans of Moe's include So So Gay, who posted a glowing introduction article teamed with a free download of song 'Volcanoes' in May 2012, as well as other popular music sites such as SBTV, LinkUpTV, Dropout UK, Music Is My Kingsize Bed, Rukkle and I Am Music TV.

== Personnel ==
Artist

- Andreas Moe: vocals, guitar, piano, engineering

Additional musicians

- Maria Marcus
- Niclas Lundin

Production

- Andreas Moe and Maria Marcus - production
- Niclas Lundin and Cutting Room - mastering

Design

- Micael Paavilainen – photography, hand lettering, layout design
