= John de Sohn =

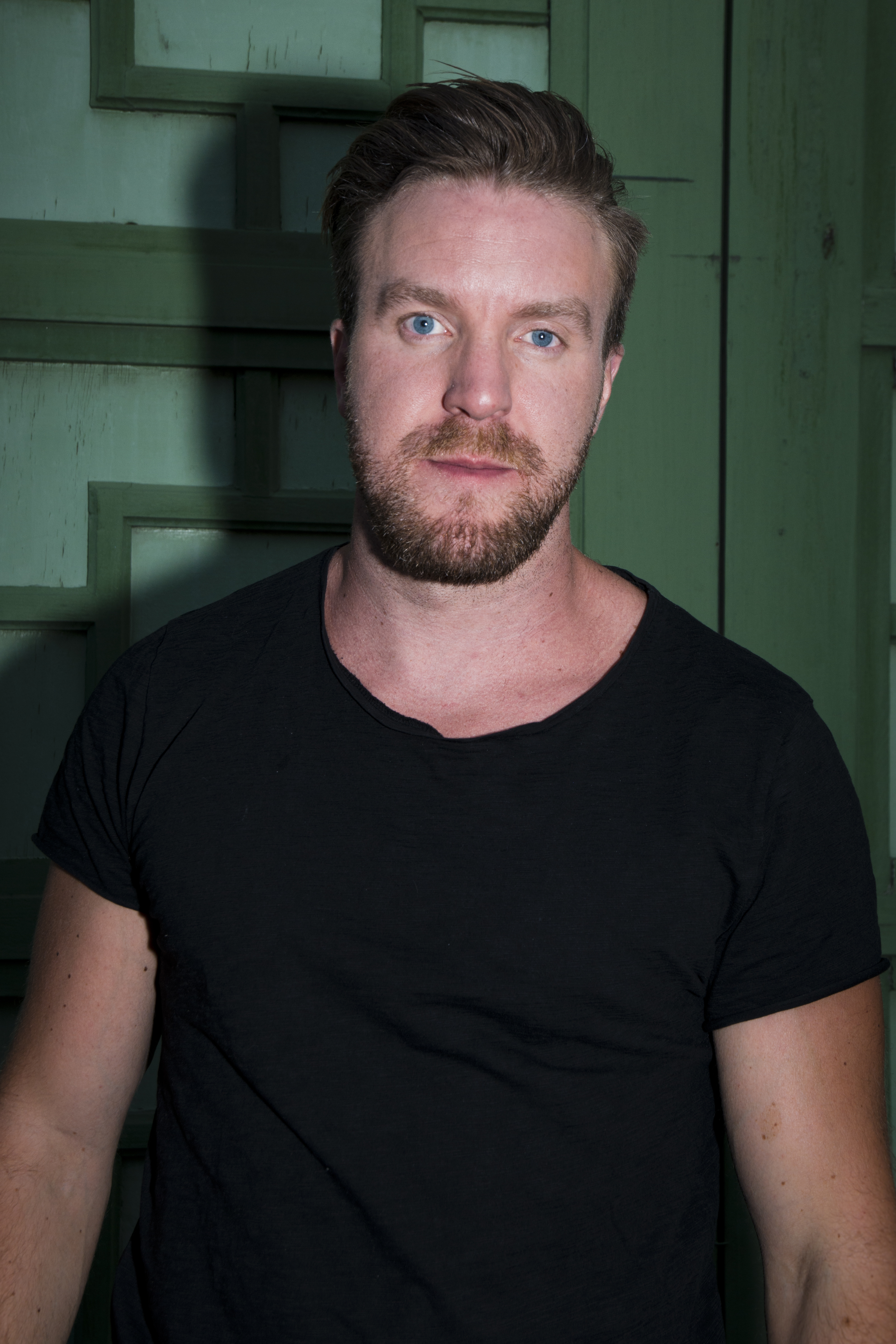
John De Sohn

Björn Johnsson, better known by his stage name John De Sohn, is a Swedish DJ and music producer well known for his dance music with very strong pop crossover. He is signed to the Sony Music label.

De Sohn started at a very young age. He took part in and won a number of DJ Battles awards. De Sohn's first commercial success was in 2012 with "Long Time" featuring the vocals of Andreas Moe, followed in 2013 by the songs "Dance Our Tears Away", which featured the vocals of Kristin Amparo, and "Under the Sun (Where We Belong)", again with Moe.

== Discography ==
Year	Album	Peak positions
Year	Album	SWE
2014	Far from Home	51
2019	Made For You	

=== Singles ===
Year	Single	Peak positions	Album
Year	Single	SWE	Album
2012	"Long Time" (featuring Andreas Moe)	36	
2013	"Dance Our Tears Away" (featuring Kristin Amparo)	16	
2013	"Under the Sun (Where We Belong)" (featuring Andreas Moe)	11	
2014	"Taking It Back"	–	
2014	"Wild Roses"	47	
2014	"You Only Love Me"	52	
2015	"Rush" (featuring Violet Days)	— (Note: "Rush" did not enter the Swedish Singles Chart, but peaked at number three on the Swedish Heatseeker chart.)	
2016	"En runda till" (featuring Albin and Mattias Andréasson)	47	
2017	"Standing When It All Falls Down" (featuring Roshi)	86	
2017	"Hum with Me"	19	
2018	"Go to Sleep"	— (Note: "Go to Sleep" did not enter the Swedish Singellista Chart, but peaked at number 14 on the Swedish Heatseeker Chart.)	
2018	"Forever Young" (featuring Liamoo)	38	
2018	"Happy Kids"	—	
2019	"Made for You"	—	
2019	"Say What You Want"	—	
2019	"Love You Better" (with Rasmus Hagen)	— (Note: "Love You Better" did not enter the Swedish Singellista Chart, but peaked at number five on the Swedish Heatseeker Chart.)	
2020	"Just Like You" (with RØRY)	—	
2020	"Lovers for the Weekend"		
2020	"Used to Be Love" (with William Segerdahl)	— (Note: "Used to Be Love" did not enter the Swedish Singles Chart, but peaked at number 16 on the Swedish Heatseeker chart.)	
2021	"When the World Was Happy" (with Inyang Bassey)	—	

=== Remixes ===
List of remixes, showing year released and original artists
Year	Title	Original artists	Ref.
2010	"Freedom" (John de Sohn Remix)	Alex Lamb featuring Christina Skaar	
2010	"Mayon" (John de Sohn Remix)	Alaa	
2010	"Harem" (John de Sohn Remix)	Starkillers & Alex Sayz	
2011	"Grenade" (John de Sohn Remix)	Bruno Mars	
2011	"Dirty Talk" (John de Sohn Remix)	Wynter Gordon	
2011	"Turn Around (5,4,3,2,1)" (John de Sohn Remix)	Flo Rida	
2011	"So Good" (John de Sohn Remix)	Alex Lamb featuring Easton Davis	
2011	"Avi" (John de Sohn Remix)	Marcus Prime & WeSmile featuring Jennifer Åkerman	
2011	"Love is Chemical" (John de Sohn Remix)	Micha Mood	
2012	"Free to Go" (John de Sohn Remix)	Alex Sayz feat. Nadia Ali	
2013	"Check You Out" (John de Sohn Remix)	Darin	
2013	"Hold On" (John de Sohn Remix)	StoneBridge, Matt Aubrey & Holevar featuring H Watkins	
2013	"Hurricane" (John de Sohn Remix)	Alaa featuring Jennifer Åkerman	
2013	"Deeper Love" (John de Sohn Remix)	Andy G, Henri Leo Thiesen & Fran Garcia feat. Max'c	
