= Albinson =

Albinson is an English surname. Notable people with the surname include:

- Dewey Albinson (1898–1971), American artist
- Don Albinson (1921–2008), American industrial designer
- George Albinson (1897–1975), English footballer

== See also ==
- Albin (disambiguation)
