= Buchanan Downtown Historic District =

Historic district in Michigan, United States

- U.S. National Register of Historic Places
- U.S. Historic district
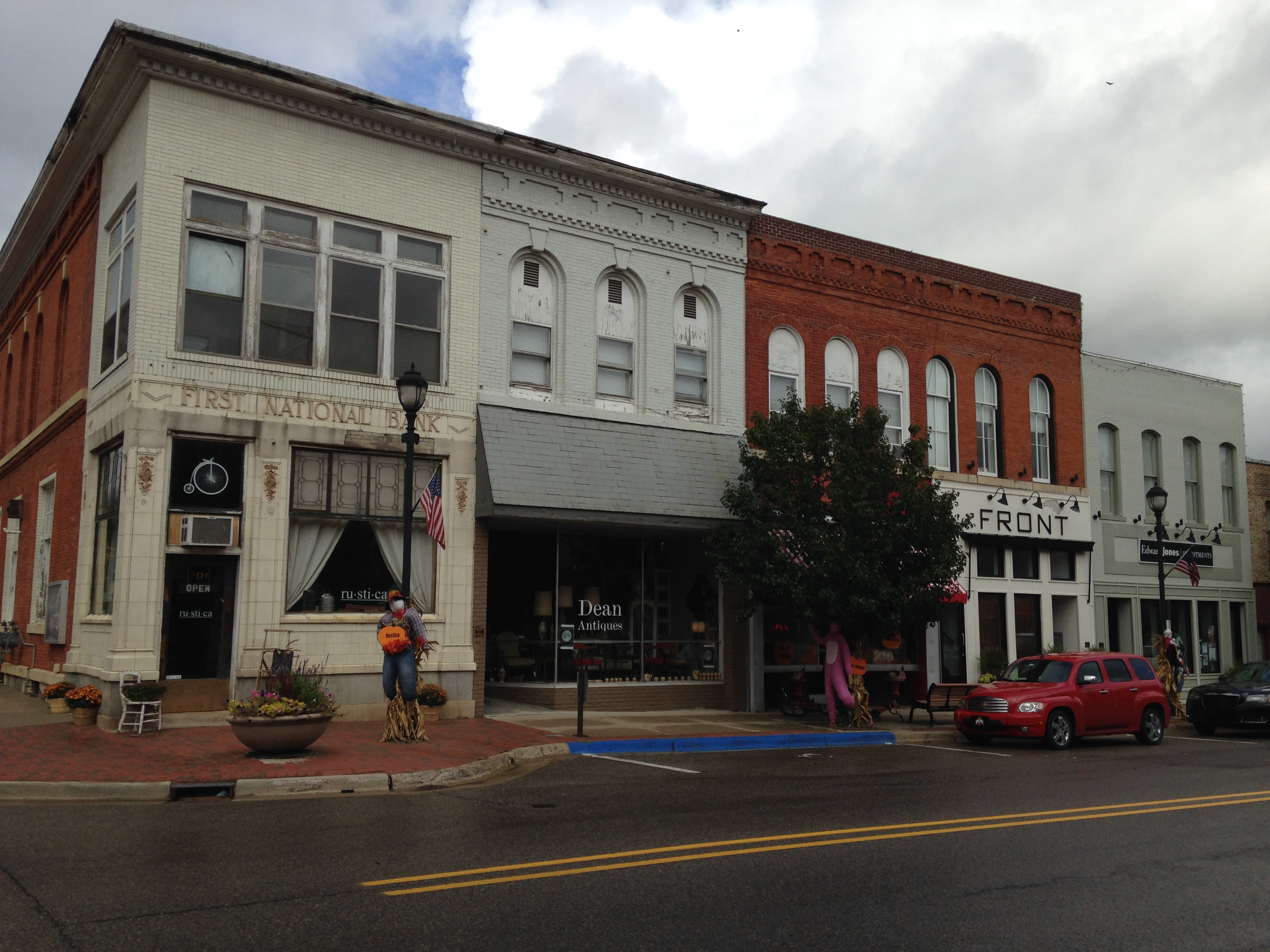
- NE corner of Front and Main
- Interactive map
- Location: Parts Front St., Main St., Oak St., and Days Ave., Buchanan, Michigan
- Area: 11 acres (4.5 ha)
- Built: 1848
- Architect: Louis A. Simon et al.
- Architectural style: Italianate, Greek Revival
- NRHP reference No.: 09000678
- Added to NRHP: September 2, 2009

The Buchanan Downtown Historic District is a primarily commercial historic district located in Buchanan, Michigan between 117 W. and 256 E. Front Street and between 108 and 210-212 Main Street, along with adjacent sections of Oak Street and Days Avenue. The district was listed on the National Register of Historic Places in 2009.

== History ==
Buchanan was first settled in 1833 by Charles Cowles, who constructed a sawmill near this site. Other settlers followed, and by 1842, when Buchanan was first platted, there were about twelve buildings in or near the village. The completion of the Michigan Central Railroad through the area in 1849 resulted in a boom in development. Although not well documented, early commercial development occurred near the intersection of Front and Main Streets, with a number of stores along Front by 1860. A devastating 1862 fire leveled much of the downtown, but the fire triggered subsequent building boom in the 1860s, with a number of buildings constructed on lots where the previous structure had been destroyed in the fire. A smaller boom followed in the 1880s.

By the end of the 19th century, the downtown area was essentially built out, and construction slowed for some time. Between about 1895 and 1954, only 17 structures were built in the district; all but two of these replaced earlier, primarily wood-frame, buildings. By the 1950s, however, development had shifted to areas outside of the downtown, and Buchanan, like many smaller towns, experienced a commercial slump in the downtown area. Starting in the 1960s, a number of buildings were demolished. Newer buildings were constructed, but the pace of revitalization was slow.

== Description ==
The Buchanan Downtown Historic District encompasses almost the entirety of Buchanan's commercial center. The district contains 40 buildings, along with a millrace, culvert, and alley. The buildings range from one to three stories tall, and date from 1855 to 1966. All the buildings in the district are constructed of brick with three exceptions: the Pears Mill, the 1855 Conant-Parkinson Building at 111 Main, and another commercial building on Front Street. The main section of the district is along Front Street, which features all of the large commercial blocks in the downtown area.

Significant buildings in the district include:

- United States Post Office (1940). Located at 110 W. Front Street, this single-story brick Colonial Revival building was designed by Louis A. Simon.
- Buchanan Public Library - now Buchanan Art Center (1956). Located at 117 W. Front Street, this modern building was designed by Roy A. Warden.
- Ross-Sanders House- Old City Hall (1856). Located at 107 W. Front Street, this two-story, T-plan, painted brick Greek Revival house was built for John D. Ross, who bought the property on which this building sits from Buchanan pioneer John Hamilton. It was Buchanan's first brick home.
- Union Block (1863). Located at 114 E. Front Street, this three-story, double-storefront, painted brick Italianate building was listed on the National Historic Register in 2007.
- Mill Alley (Dedicated 1856). Located at 116 E. Front Street, this alley was established to provide access to Pears Mill. In 1914, the Princess Theater was built over the alley, closing it until the Princess was demolished in 1991.
- Pears Millrace (c. 1848). This millrace runs for about a half mile through the district. John D. Ross had this race dug in about 1848, presumably in part to serve an early mill near its course which is no longer extant.
- Pears Mill (1857–58). Located at 115 S. Oak Street, this two-story wood-framed gable-roofed structure was built directly on the already extant millrace. It is the only remaining mill of the 13 or so mills constructed near Buchanan's downtown.

== Gallery ==
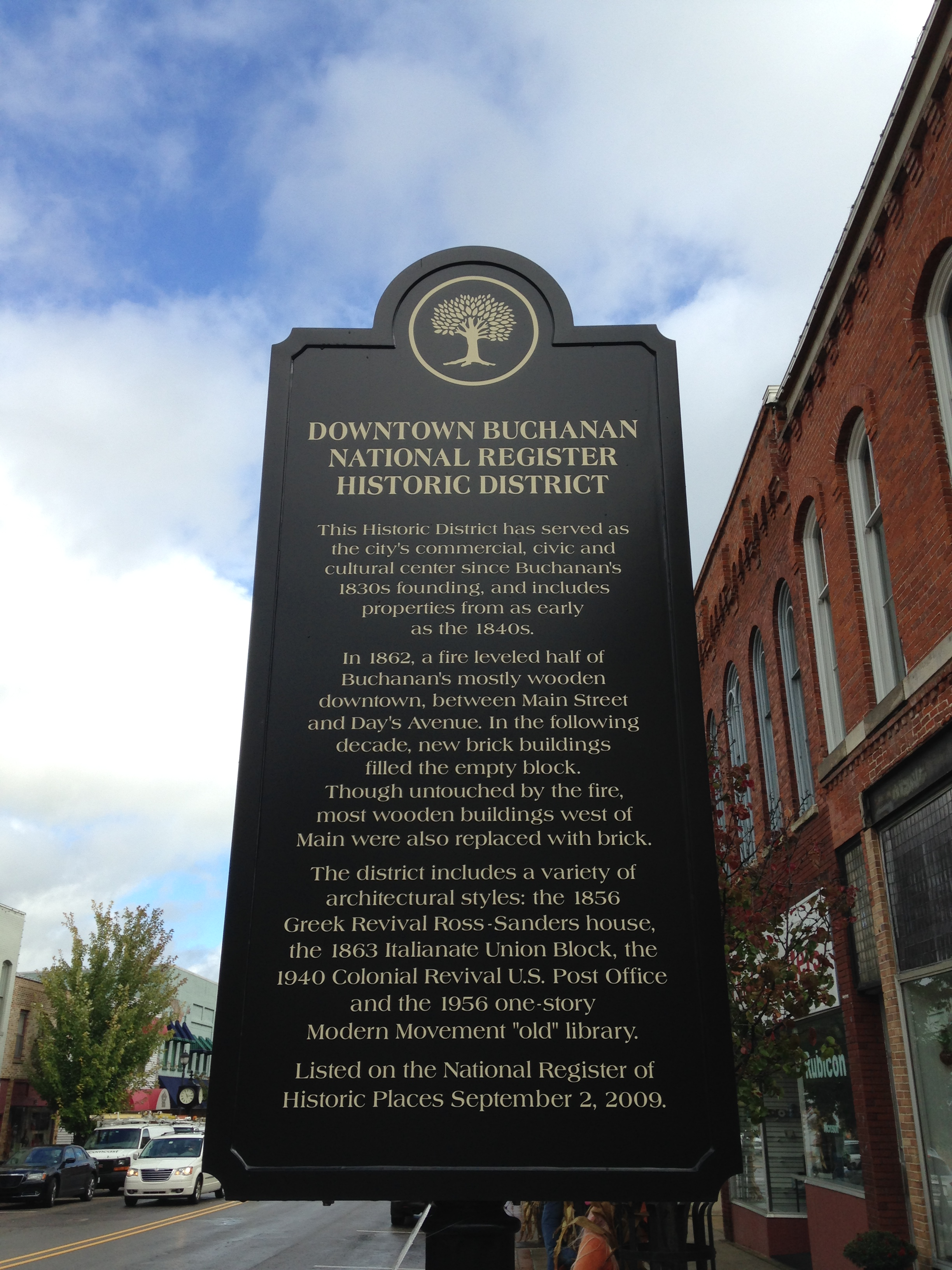
Sign

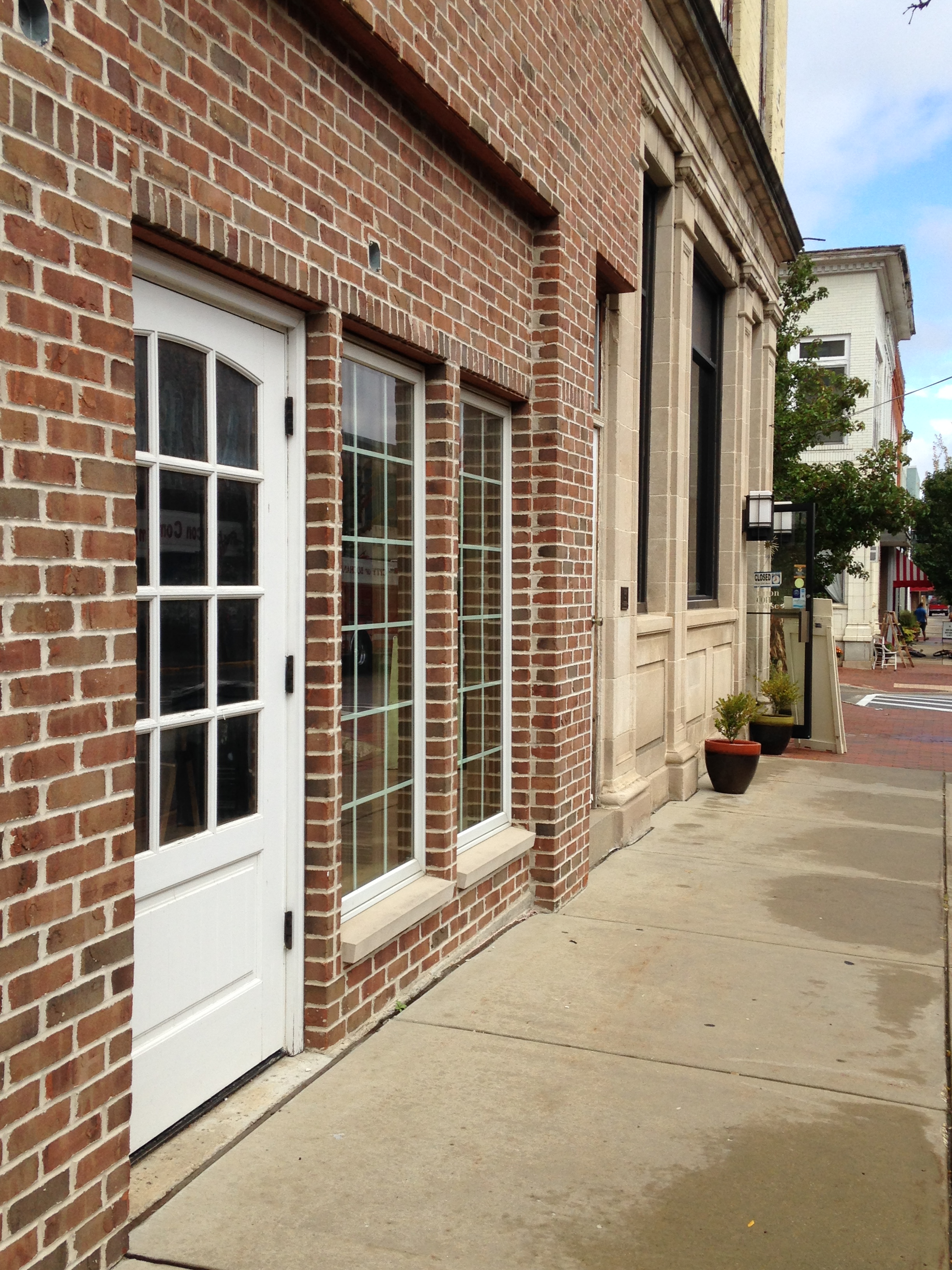
Detail, NW corner of Front and Main

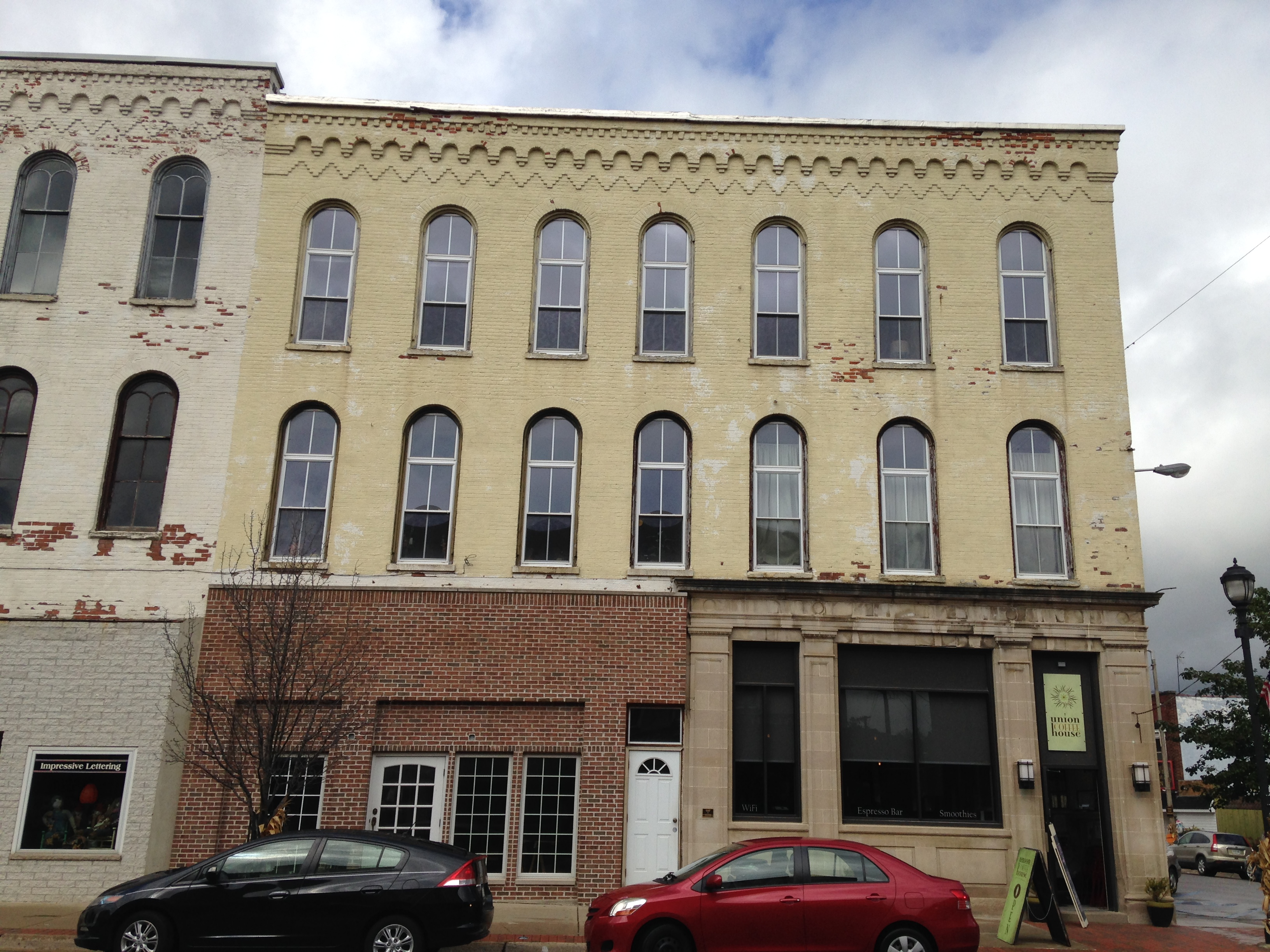
NW corner of Front and Main

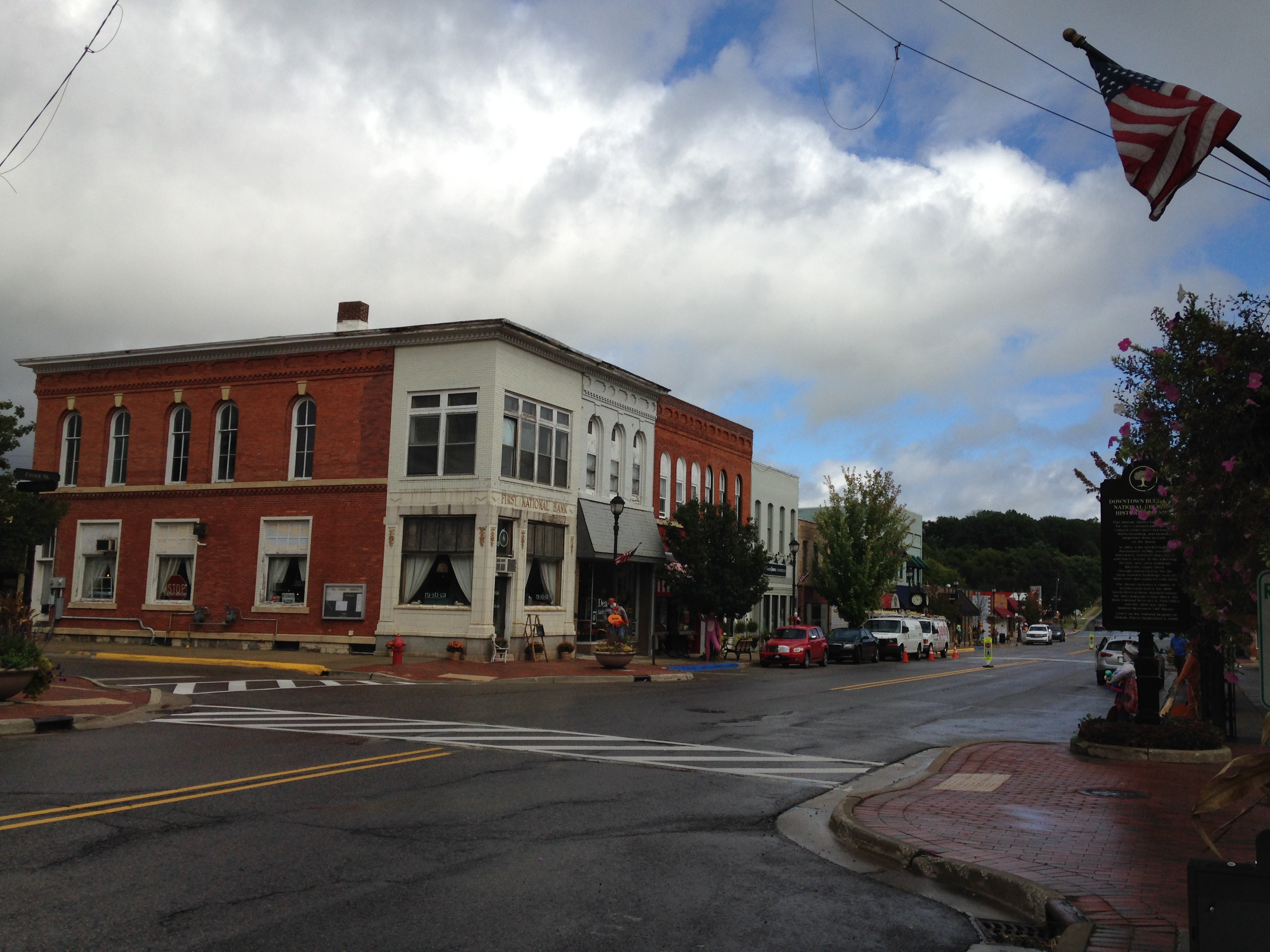
NE corner of Front and Main

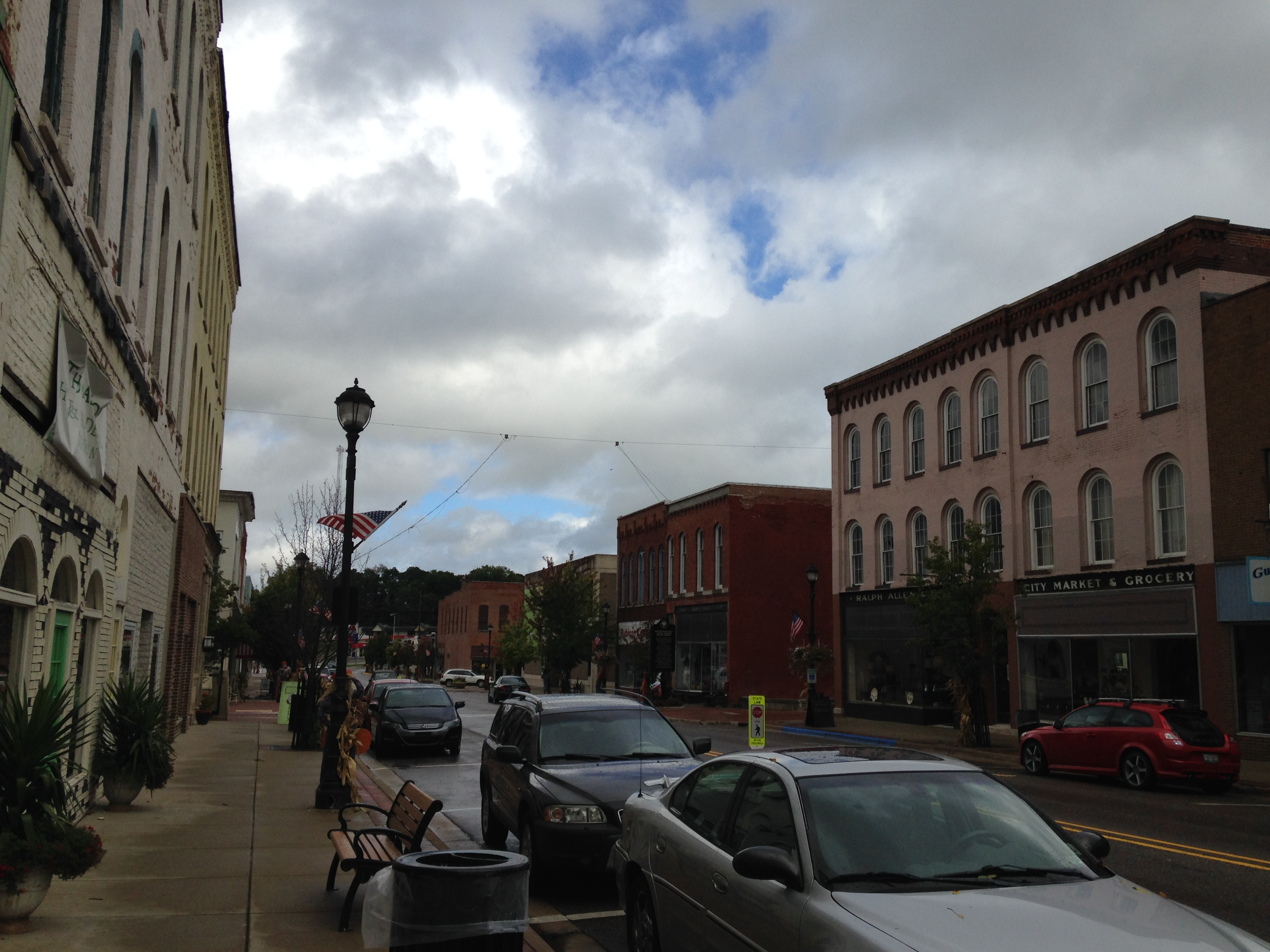
Front Street, looking east

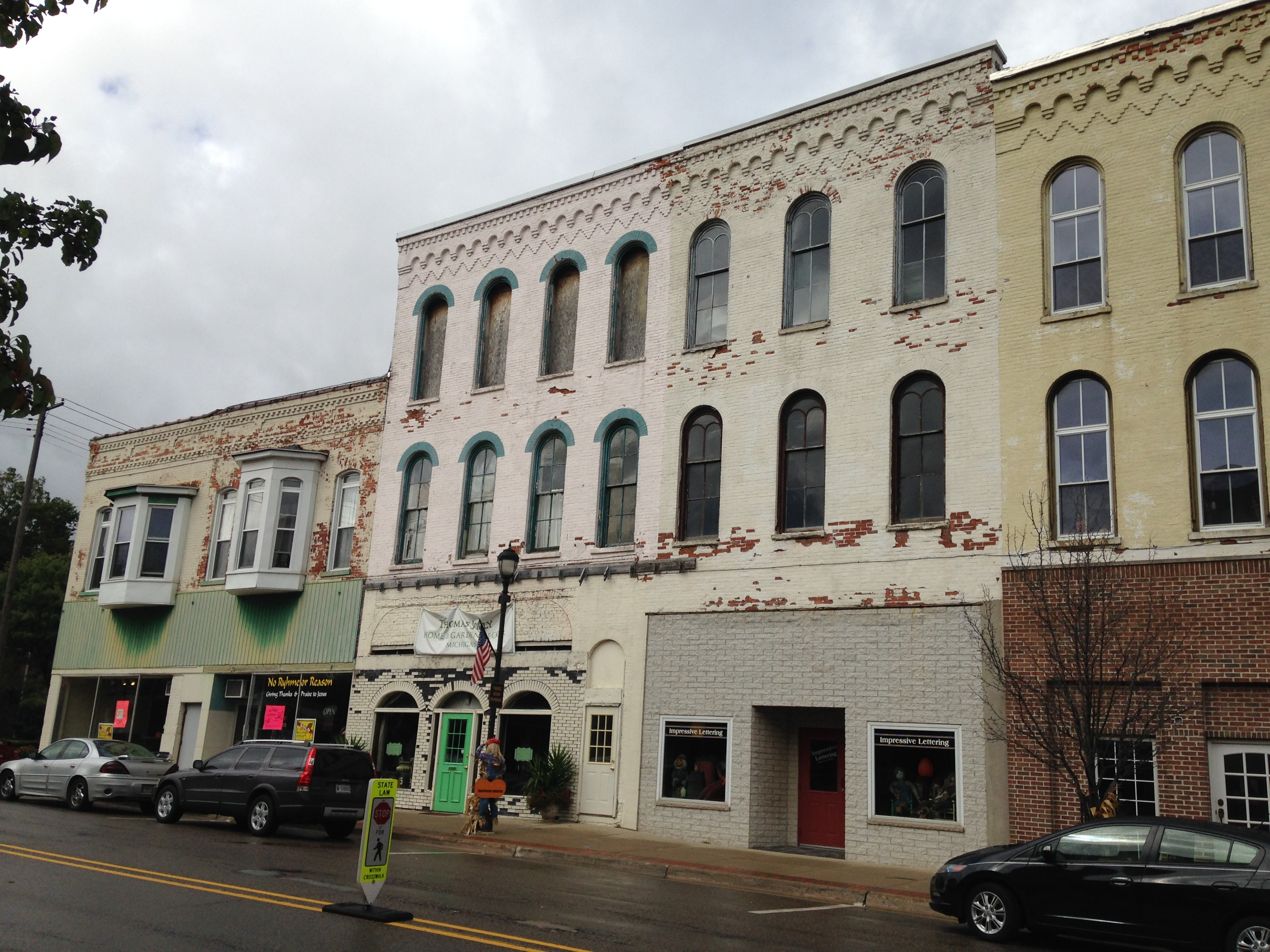
North side of Front Street

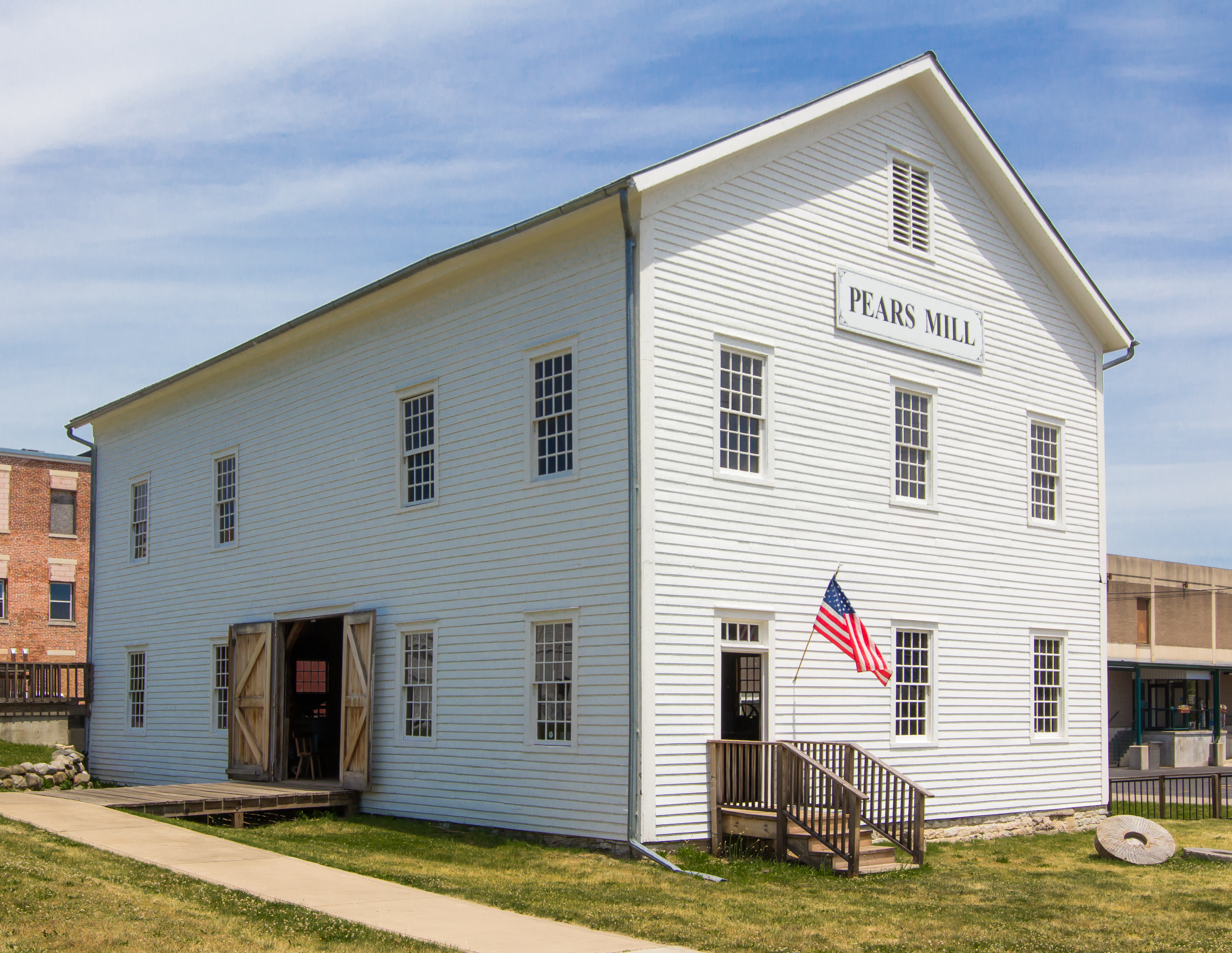
Pears Mill

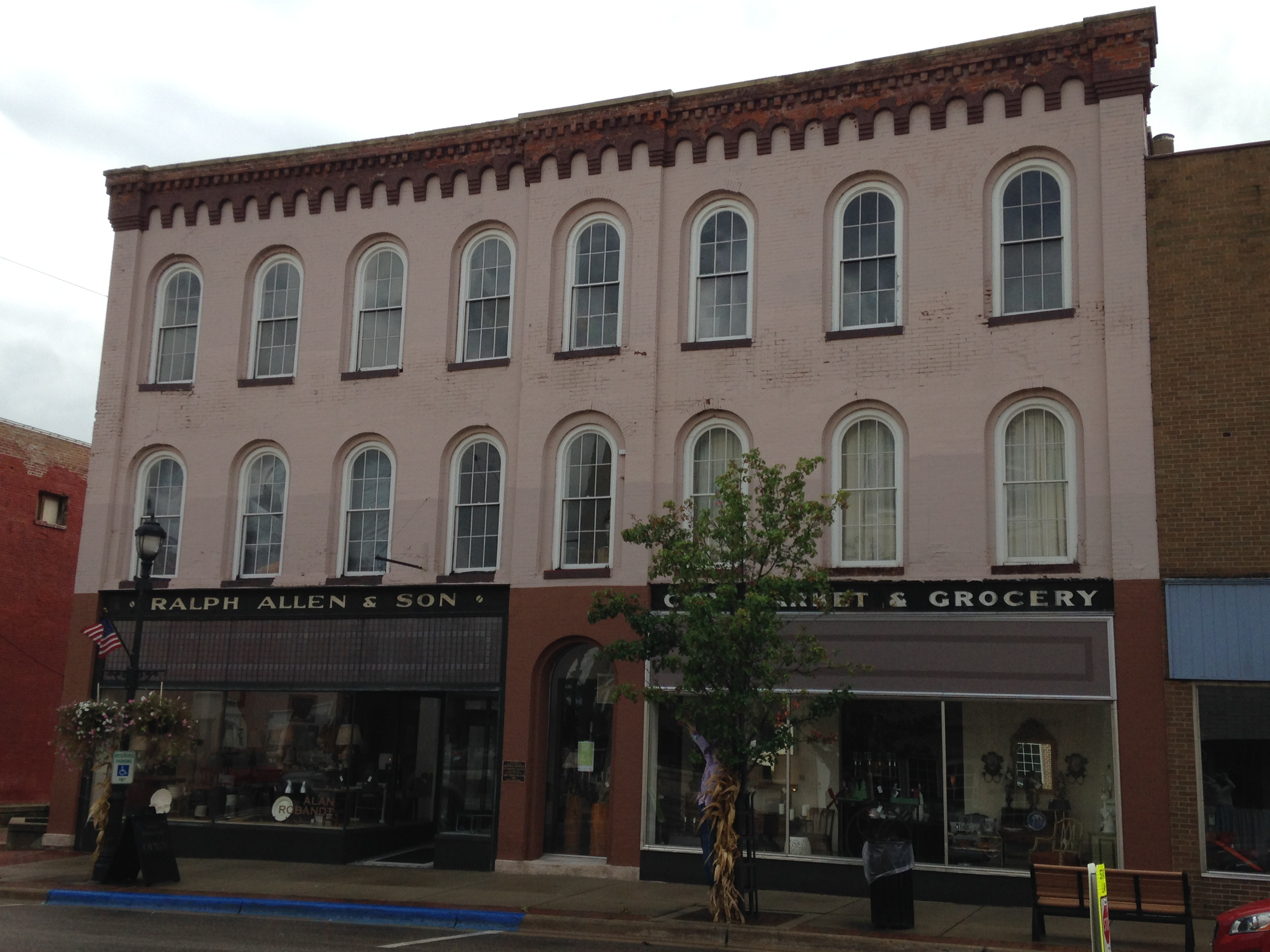
Union Block
