= Din soldat =

Single by Albin Johnsén and Kristin Amparo

from the album Din soldat EP
- Released: May 2014
- Label: Universal Music
- Songwriters: Mattias Andréasson, Viktor Bolander, Albin Johnsén, Kristin Amparo

Din soldat is a song, written by Mattias Andréasson, Viktor Bolander, Albin Johnsén and Kristin Amparo and recorded by Albin Johnsén and Kristin Amparo for the 2014 EP Din soldat EP. Becoming a major success, the song topped the Swedish singles chart in July that year.

== Charts ==
=== Weekly charts ===
Chart (2014)	Peak position
Sweden (Sverigetopplistan)	1

=== Year-end charts ===
Chart (2014)	Position
Sweden (Sverigetopplistan)	7
