= Rik (song) =

Single by Albin Johnsén & Mattias Andréasson
- Released: 28 February 2016
- Genre: Pop rap
- Length: 3:02
- Label: Capitol Music Group Sweden
- Songwriters: Albin Johnsén; Mattias Andréasson

Albin Johnsén singles chronology
"En sista gång" (2015)	"Rik" (2016)

Mattias Andréasson singles chronology
"Frank" (2015)	"Rik" (2016)

"Rik" (English: Rich) is a song by Swedish rapper Albin Johnsén and Swedish singer Mattias Andréasson. The song was released in Sweden as a digital download on 28 February 2016, and was written by Johnsén and Andréasson. It took part in Melodifestivalen 2016 and qualified to andra chansen from the first semi-finale. In the semi-finale, it was eliminated.

== Track listing ==
Digital download
No.	Title	Length
1.	"Rik"	3:02

== Charts ==
Chart (2016)	Peak position
Sweden (Sverigetopplistan)	19

== Release history ==
Region	Date	Format	Label
Sweden	28 February 2016	Digital download	Capitol Music Group Sweden
