= Kristin Amparo =

Swedish singer

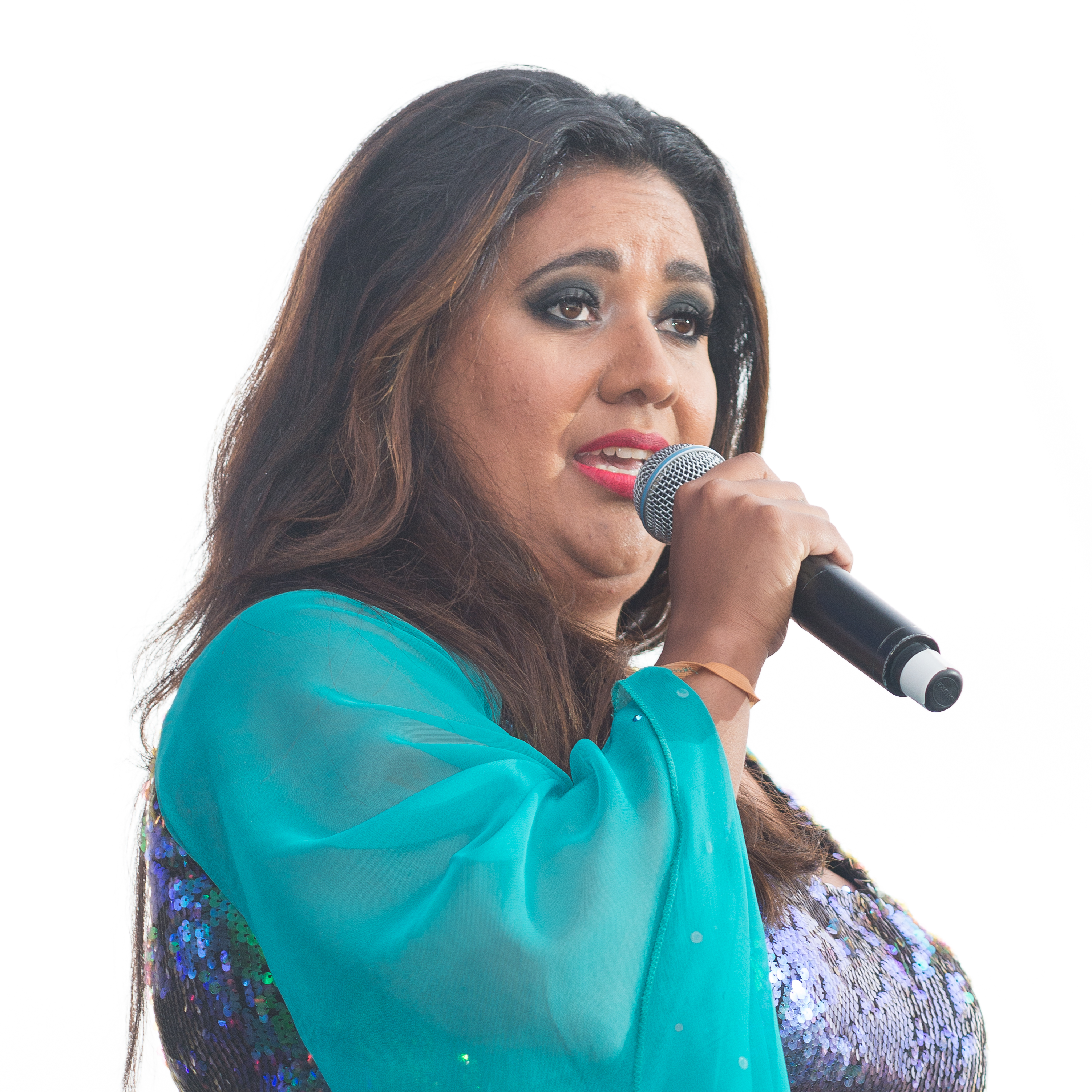
- Kristin Amparo at Stockholm Pride 2015

Background information
- Born: 1 December 1983 (age 42); Cali, Colombia
- Origin: Lidingö, Sweden

Kristin Viktoria Amparo Sundberg (born 1 December 1983) is a Swedish singer. She attended Adolf Fredrik's Music School in Stockholm. She participated in season 1 of the Swedish X Factor in 2012, which was broadcast on TV4, where she made it to the judge's houses stage before being eliminated. Amparo participated in Melodifestivalen 2015 with the song "I See You" in the third semi-final. She made it to the "Second Chance" round but failed to make it to the Melodifestivalen final.

== Discography ==
=== Singles ===
==== As lead artist ====
Title	Year	Peak chart positions	Certifications	Album
Title	Year	SWE	Certifications	Album
"I See You"	2015	40		Non-album single
"—" denotes a single that did not chart or was not released in that territory.

==== As featured artist ====
Title	Year	Peak chart positions	Certifications	Album
Title	Year	SWE	Certifications	Album
"Dance Our Tears Away" (John de Sohn featuring Kristin Amparo)	2013	15	GLF: 2× Platinum	Non-album single
"Din soldat" (Albin featuring Kristin Amparo)	2014	1	GLF: 6× Platinum	Din soldat EP
"—" denotes a single that did not chart or was not released in that territory.
