= Andreas Moe =

Swedish musician (born 1988)

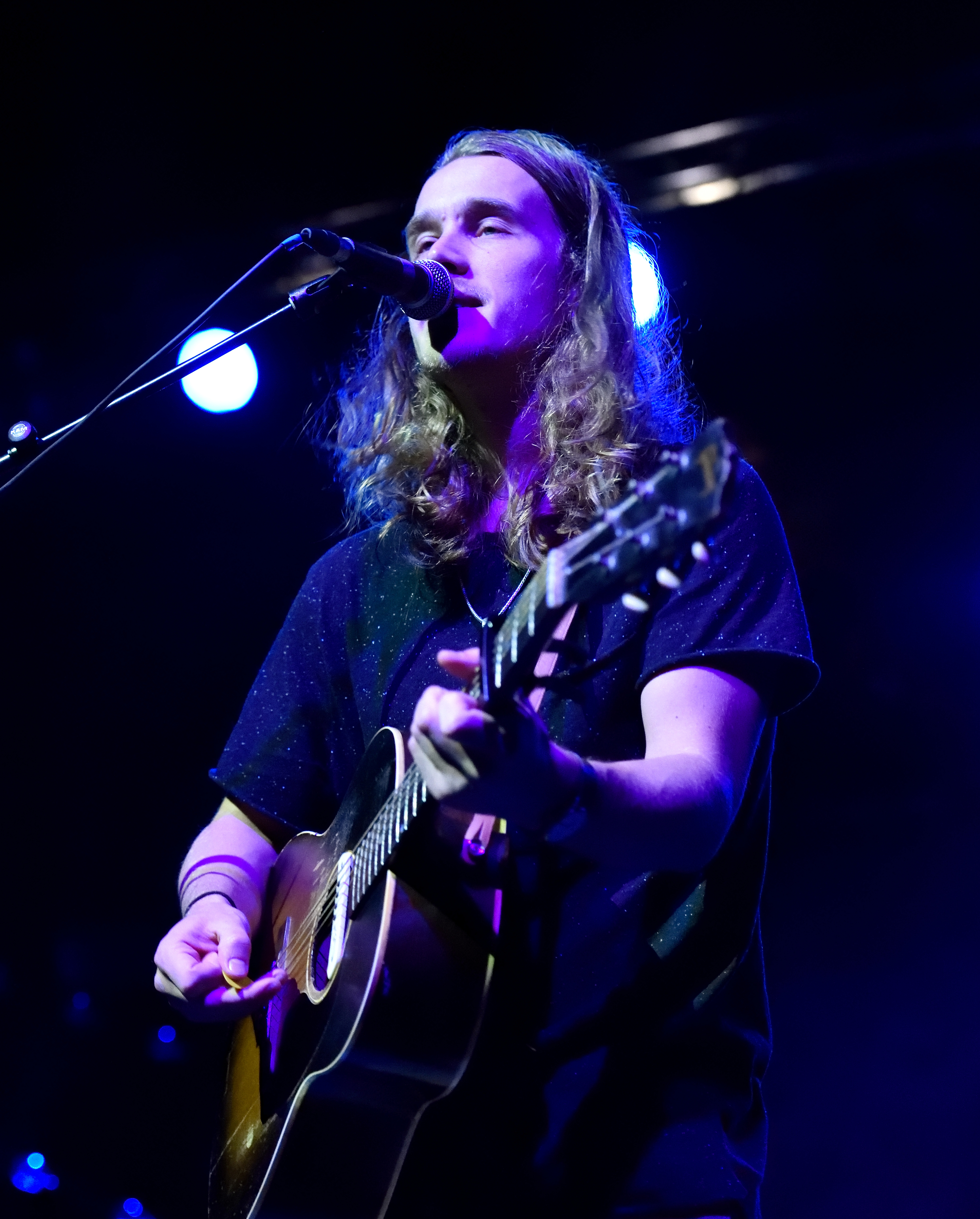
- Andreas Moe in 2012 (taken by Paul Archer)

Background information
- Born: Andreas Moe; 2 October 1988 (age 37); Stockholm, Sweden
- Genres: Pop; acoustic
- Occupations: Singer; songwriter; record producer; multi-instrumentalist
- Years active: 2004–present
- Label: Unsigned

Andreas Moe (born 2 October 1988) is a Swedish singer, songwriter, record producer and multi-instrumentalist.

== Biography ==
Moe was born and raised in Stockholm and aspired to be a singer and songwriter from an early age. He grew up listening to the likes of Stevie Ray Vaughan and Michael Jackson, and in later years developed an interest in the acoustic guitar driven sounds of Jeff Buckley. Having played his early writings in virtually every youth centre and bar in Stockholm, Moe earned his place as session guitarist with Bosson and Ulrik Munther. He continued to develop as a producer and artist, and in January 2011 signed a UK publishing deal with Phrased Differently, followed swiftly by a management deal with Hiten Bharadia and Luke Williams. He has a record deal with Sony for Scandinavia and continues to self release throughout the rest of the globe.

== Music career ==
=== Artist career ===
In July 2011, Moe recorded his first feature on the Avicii track "Fade into Darkness". The song reached number 4 in the Swedish Singles Chart (Sverigetopplistan) - and achieved further success in Poland & Netherlands. The song was also destined for UK release - before it became wrapped up in controversy - after Leona Lewis released a similar version of the track's instrumental under the name Collide. Avicii later claimed that Lewis's record label, Syco, had "stolen" his idea without his permission. Lewis and Avicii eventually settled in court, coming to an amicable mutual agreement to release the song as a collaboration between Lewis and Avicii - meaning that Fade into Darkness was dropped as a UK release.

In December 2011, Moe co-wrote and featured on the platinum selling John De Sohn track 'Long Time'. The song, which charted at number 36 in the Swedish Singles Chart (Sverigetopplistan), was released again in April 2012 on Tiesto's compilation album Club Life: Volume Two Miami - which charted worldwide, reaching Number 1 in the US Billboard Dance/Electronic Albums, Number 6 in the UK Album Chart, and Number 3 in the Swiss Album Chart - as well as charting high in many other territories. Soon after, it was revealed that 'Long Time' had been picked up by LA Reid at Epic Records US as a single and was to be serviced to radio on 20 May 2012. The song was released as a single in the US later on in the year.

In May 2012, Moe announced via his Facebook page that his first EP Collecting Sunlight was scheduled for digital release on the UK iTunes Store, and also Spotify, on 25 June 2012. He has since received glowing reviews of the EP from around the world, including articles from famous American blogs Arjan Writes, and Music Is My Kingsize Bed. The EP was also released throughout Scandinavia through Sony Music Sweden - dropping in Sweden and Norway on 29 June 2012, and Finland and Denmark on 2 July 2012.

Due to the success of Avicii's "Fade into Darkness", Moe teamed up with Avicii again to make a vocal edit of "Last Dance". However, the vocal edit was unreleased.

Moe also had four songs, sung and co-written by himself, featured in the Noel Clarke film The Knot. The film was released in the UK through Universal Pictures on 5 October 2012.

He has worked with Tiesto, Hardwell, Fedde Le Grande and Avicii, Eddie Thoneick and Norman Doray.

In 2013, in addition to recording his debut album in Scandinavia & the UK, Moe supported both Gabrielle Aplin & Lucy Spraggan as main support on their UK tours, playing to over 40,000 fans. On 9 June 2014, he was the opening act for John Mayer's solitary UK concert at the O2 Arena that year.

=== Songwriting career ===
In 2014, Moe signed a 2 album deal with Sony Scandinavia and will release an album in Sweden in October 2014. In the UK he will release a series of UK Eps starting with "Ocean" in June 2014. He also featured on Tiesto's album and a Hardwell & Tiesto collaboration in October 2014.

Moe also enjoys a successful songwriting career in and around Europe. He co-wrote the first single 'Won't You Stay' for runner-up of The Voice of Holland, Chris Hordijk which peaked at number 6 in the Dutch Top 40., as well as his follow up single 'Jump From A Waterfall'. He also co-wrote the first single 'Awake' for runner up of The Voice of Belgium, Silke Mastbooms - which reached number 2 in the Belgian Top 50 charts (Ultratop 50).

In August 2012, Moe received his first number 1 as a songwriter with Dutch duo Nick En Simon with the song 'Alles Overwinnen' in the Dutch Singles charts, as well as his first Platinum record for his co-write and feature with John De Sohn, 'Long Time'.

In 2013, Moe wrote a song called "Who We Are" with Lawson's Andy Brown, which was recorded by Boyzone on the BZ20 album released on 22 November 2013. The album reached No. 6 in the UK and has been certified Gold. "Who We Are" was scheduled to be the third single.

He is also known to have written with various rising stars including British pop rock group Lawson, multi-platinum selling producer Jake Gosling, The Voice of Holland Season 1 winner Ben Saunders, and pop rock band Rixton.

He also opened John Mayer's concerts in Amsterdam on 2 and 3 May 2017, Stockholm on 7 May 2017, Copenhagen on 9 May 2017 and London on 11 and 12 May 2017.

== Discography ==
=== Albums ===
- Before the Rumble Comes (2015)

=== Extended plays ===
- Collecting Sunlight (2012)
- This Year (2013)
- Ocean (2014)
- Borderline (2015)
- Maybe It's All We Dreamed Of (2017)
- All Our Worries Are Poems – Pt. 1 (2021)

=== Singles ===
As lead artist

Year	Single	Chart peak (SWE)	Chart peak NED	Album
2013	"This Year (As We Go)"			
2016	"Frozen River"			
2017	"Ocean (Take the Dive)"			Maybe It's All We Dreamed Of
2017	"Bus Stop"			Maybe It's All We Dreamed Of
2017	"Something Right"			Maybe It's All We Dreamed Of

As featured artist

Year	Single	Chart peak (SWE)	Chart peak NED	Album
2012	"Fade into Darkness" (Avicii) (Uncredited vocals from Andreas Moe)	4	27	Non-album singles
2012	"Long Time" (John de Sohn featuring Andreas Moe)	36	—	Non-album singles
2013	"Under the Sun (Where We Belong)" (John de Sohn featuring Andreas Moe)	11	—	Non-album singles
2014	"Echoes" (Tiësto featuring Andreas Moe)	—	—	A Town Called Paradise
2015	"Colors" (Hardwell featuring Andreas Moe)	—	—	United We Are
2020	"All On Me" (Armin van Buuren and Brennan Heart featuring Andreas Moe)	—	—	Non-album single
"—" denotes a recording that did not chart or was not released.
