= Union Block (Buchanan, Michigan) =

- U.S. National Register of Historic Places
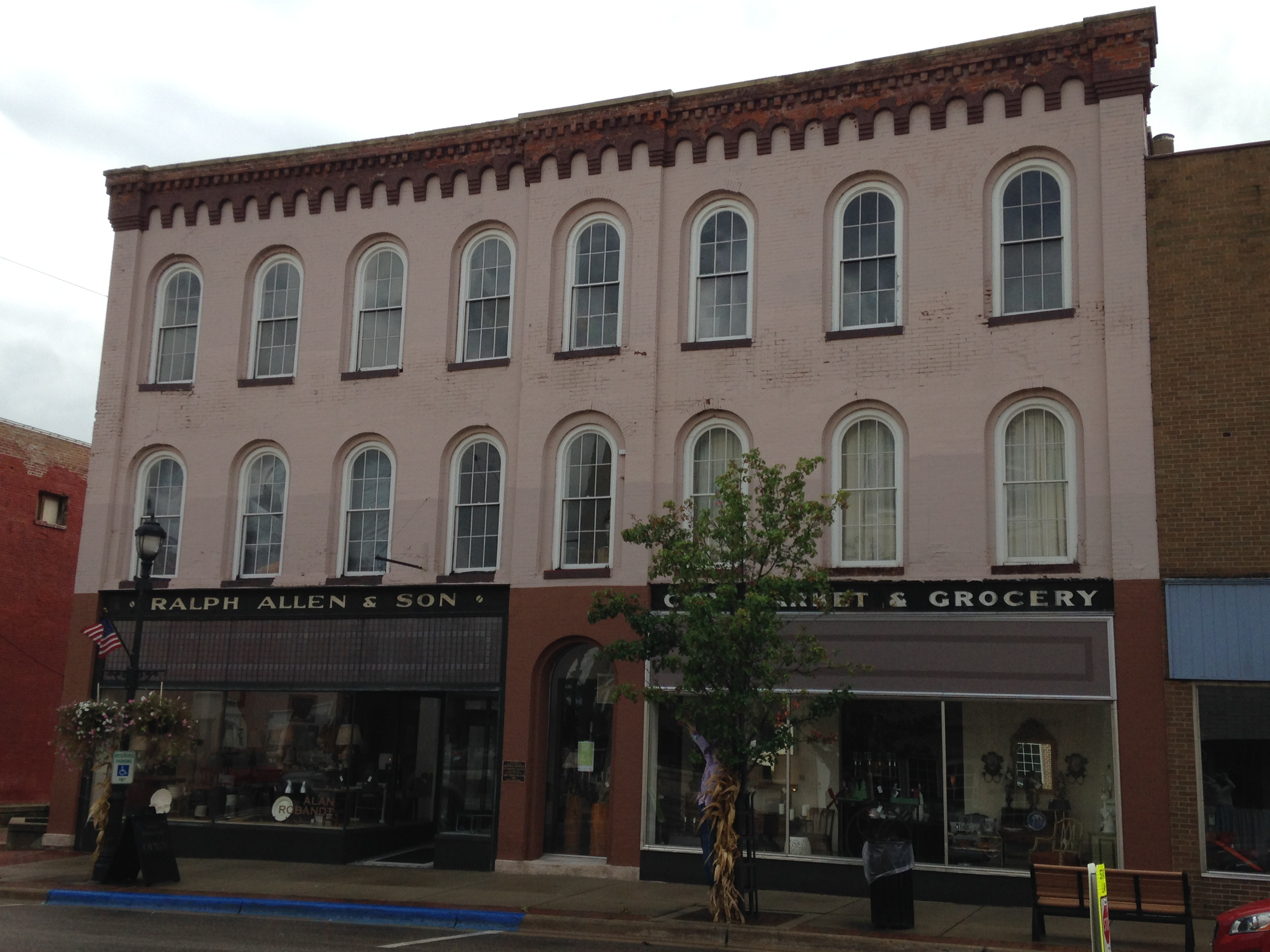

- Location within Michigan Location within the United States
- Interactive map
- Location: 114 E. Front St., Buchanan, Michigan
- Coordinates: 41°49′37″N 86°21′38″W
- Area: less than one acre
- Built: 1862
- Architectural style: Italianate
- NRHP reference No.: 07000746
- Added to NRHP: August 22, 2007

The Union Block, also known as Kinyon's Block, Roe's Block, or Pear's Block, is a commercial building located at 114 East Front Street in Buchanan, Michigan. It was listed on the National Register of Historic Places in 2007.

== History ==
Buchanan became the commercial center of the surrounding area in the 1840s, and the business district developed rapidly in the 1850s. In 1848, business partners Lorenzo Alexander and John Ross built a two-story stone commercial building in Buchanan, and in 1850 the pair established a general store. By 1860, the business partners had constructed a three-story brick commercial block, the Excelsior Block, in downtown Buchanan near this location. In 1862 Ross and Alexander started a second project, the Union block. However, in 1862 a devastating fire swept through the area, destroying a number of commercial buildings including the Excelsior Block, but sparing the partially built Union Block. The building was completed the next year.

The building was used for commercial businesses on the first floor and professional tenants on the second floor. The first commercial tenants were likely J.D. Ross's dry goods store and a second dry goods store owned by Ross and Alexander. Subsequent tenants included businesses selling dry goods, groceries, hardware and other items. One of the storefronts housed a succession of hardware stores for almost 100 years, from at least 1896 through 1994. Professional tenants on the second floor included doctors, barbers, lawyers, and others, but the last tenant departed in the 1940s. The third floor was originally a large hall, but at some point (perhaps as early as 1870) was divided into two spaces. These spaces were used for public events, including dances, socials, performances, and religious services.

== Description ==
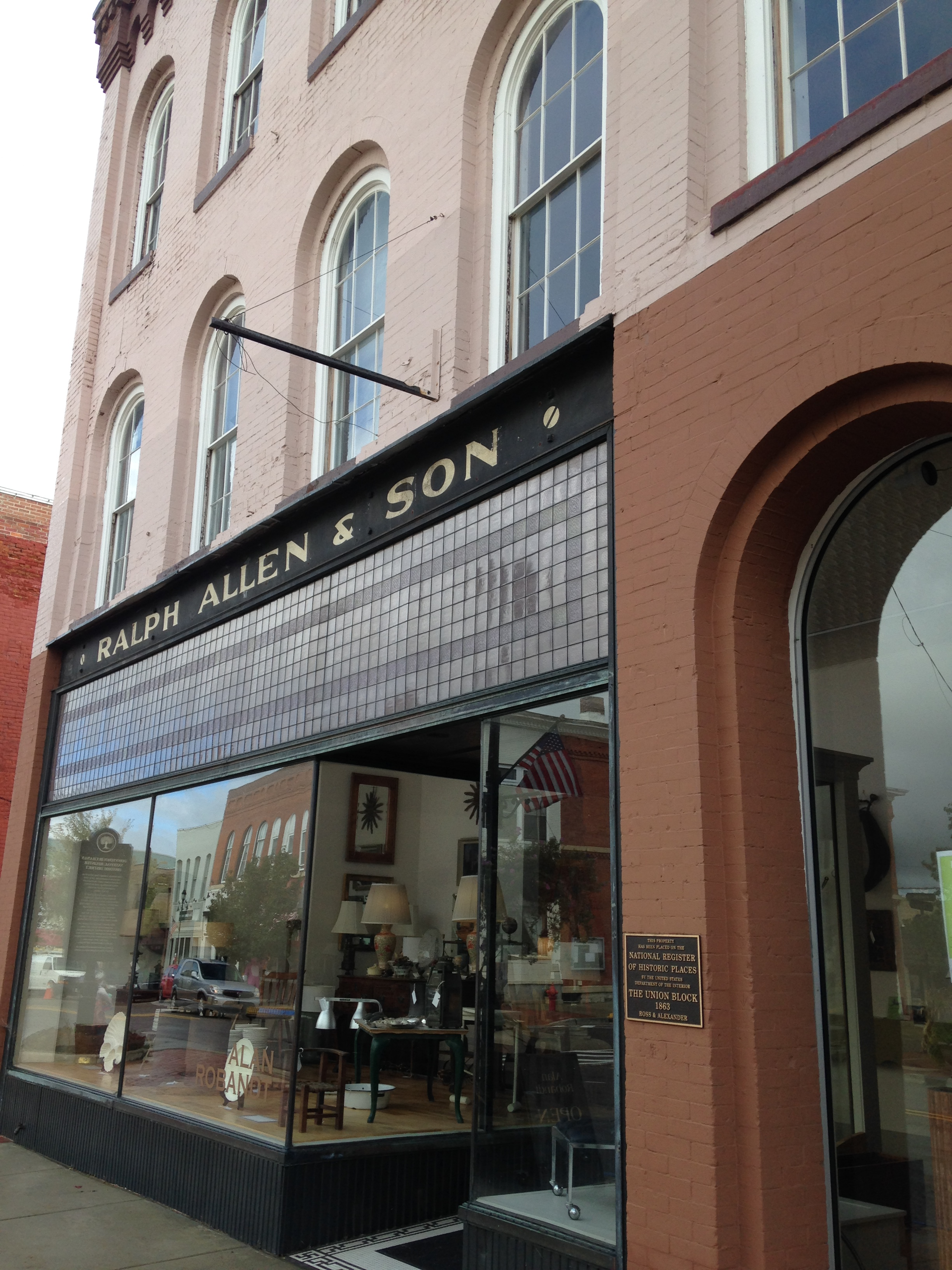
Facade detail

The Union Block is a three-story, brick Italianate commercial building containing two storefronts. The building measures 58 feet by 56 feet, and the roof gradually slopes from front to rear. The front facade has its original arched windows on the upper floors, and a cornice tops the facade. It is divided into two unequal storefronts - one three bays wide and one four bays wide - separated by a slightly projecting bay that originally had an open entryway leading to a stair accessing the upper floors. The storefronts were modernized in the 1950s, replacing the open entryway with a display window and combining the two storefronts into one, with a single recessed entrance.

The interior originally housed two separate stores with a wall and stair between them. The stores have been combined into one, the interior wall removed, and the stair repositioned to the rear. The second floor historically housed multiple offices, but the interior partitions have been reconfigured. The third floor was originally a single large, open space, but a center wall now separates the space into two portions, each of which contains a large open space at the front and smaller rooms at the rear.
