= McCoy Creek (Michigan) =

River in Michigan, United States

Coordinates: 41.83560°N 86.34640°W

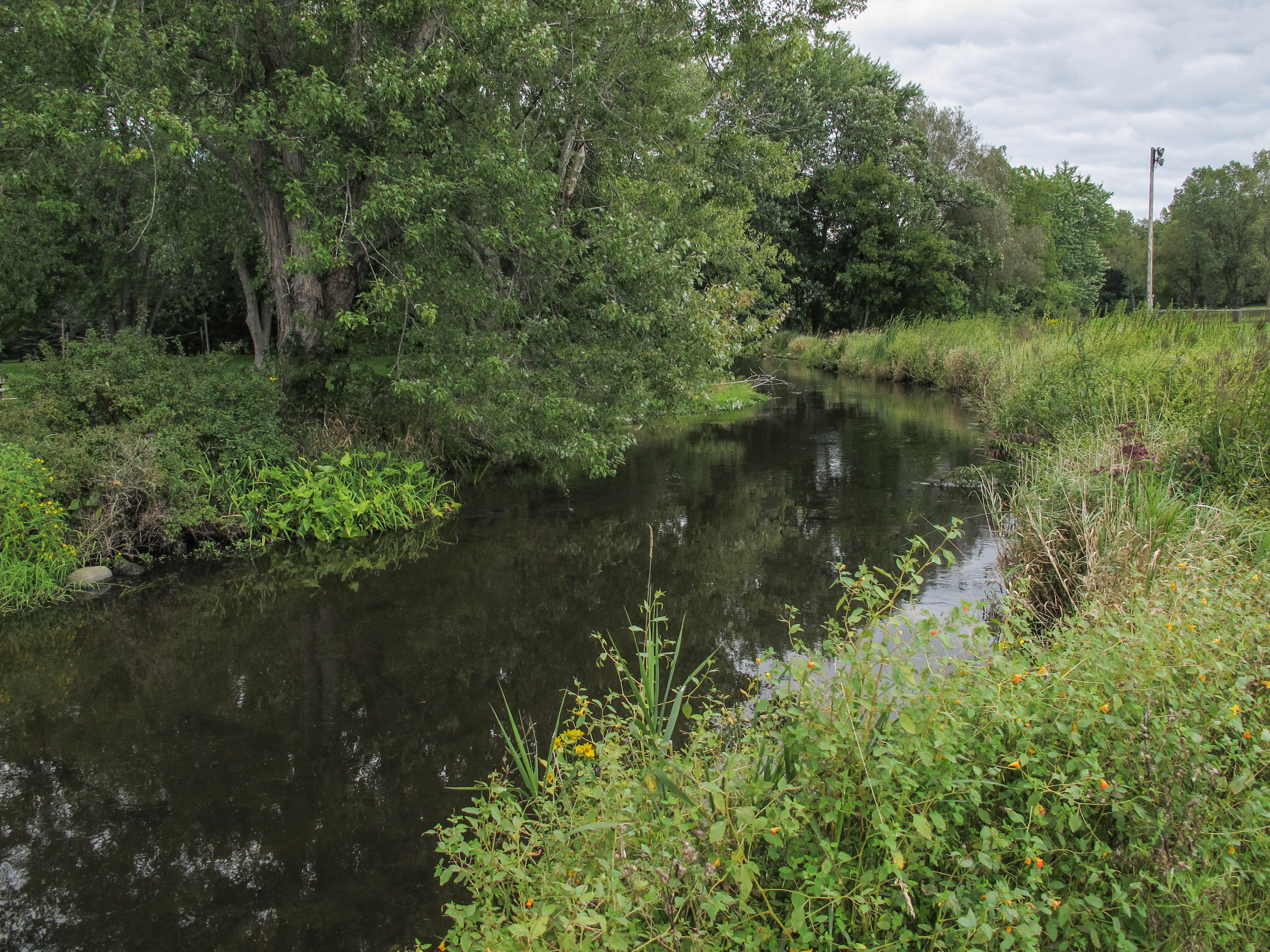
McCoy Creek in Buchanan

McCoy Creek is a tributary of the St. Joseph River in southeastern Berrien County, Michigan.

The headwaters are located in southwestern Bertrand Township in Berrien County, and adjacent portions of Olive and Warren townships in St. Joseph County, Indiana. The main channel flows primarily north (through Bertrand Township) and northeast (through Buchanan Township) for a distance of 6–7 miles (10–11 km) to its confluence with the St. Joseph River at the city of Buchanan. The McCoy Creek drainage is bounded to the north, northeast, east, and southeast by the St. Joseph River basin, to the south and southwest by the headwaters of the Kankakee River, and to the west and northwest by the Galien River basin.

The creek has the name of Reverend Isaac McCoy, a local minister.
