= Albin (meteorite) =

Meteorite found in Laramie County, Wyoming

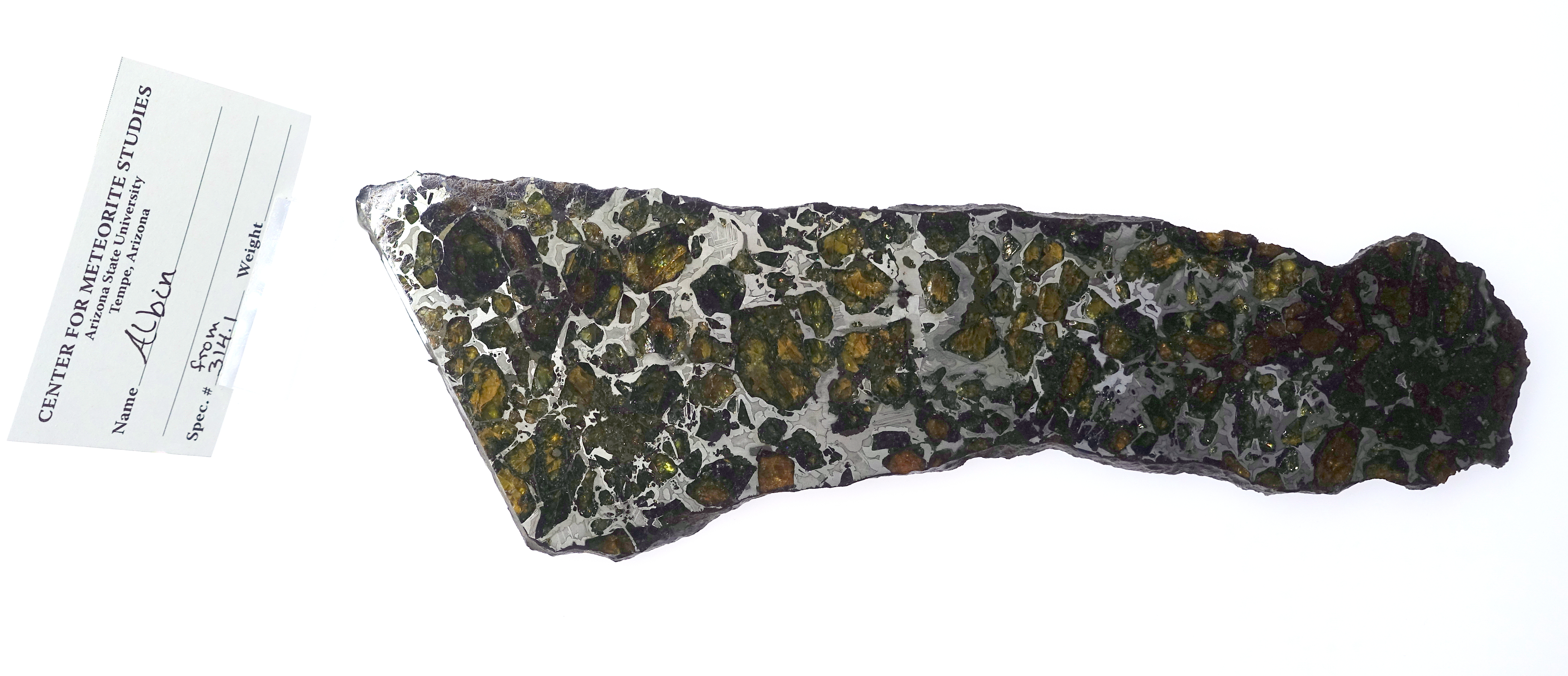
- Albin meteorite exhibit at the Center for Meteorite Studies, Tempe, Arizona.
- Class: Pallasite
- Composition: Fe, Ni
- Country: United States
- Region: Wyoming
- Coordinates: 41°30′N 104°06′W
- Observed fall: No
- Fall date: 1915
- TKW: 37.6 kg

Albin meteorite is a meteorite found in Laramie County, Wyoming, United States. It is a pallasite of 83 pounds (38 kg) and is characterized by very clear crystals of olivine up to 1.5 inches (3.8 cm) across.

== See also ==
- Glossary of meteoritics
