= Albin Johnsén =

Swedish artist, rapper, and songwriter

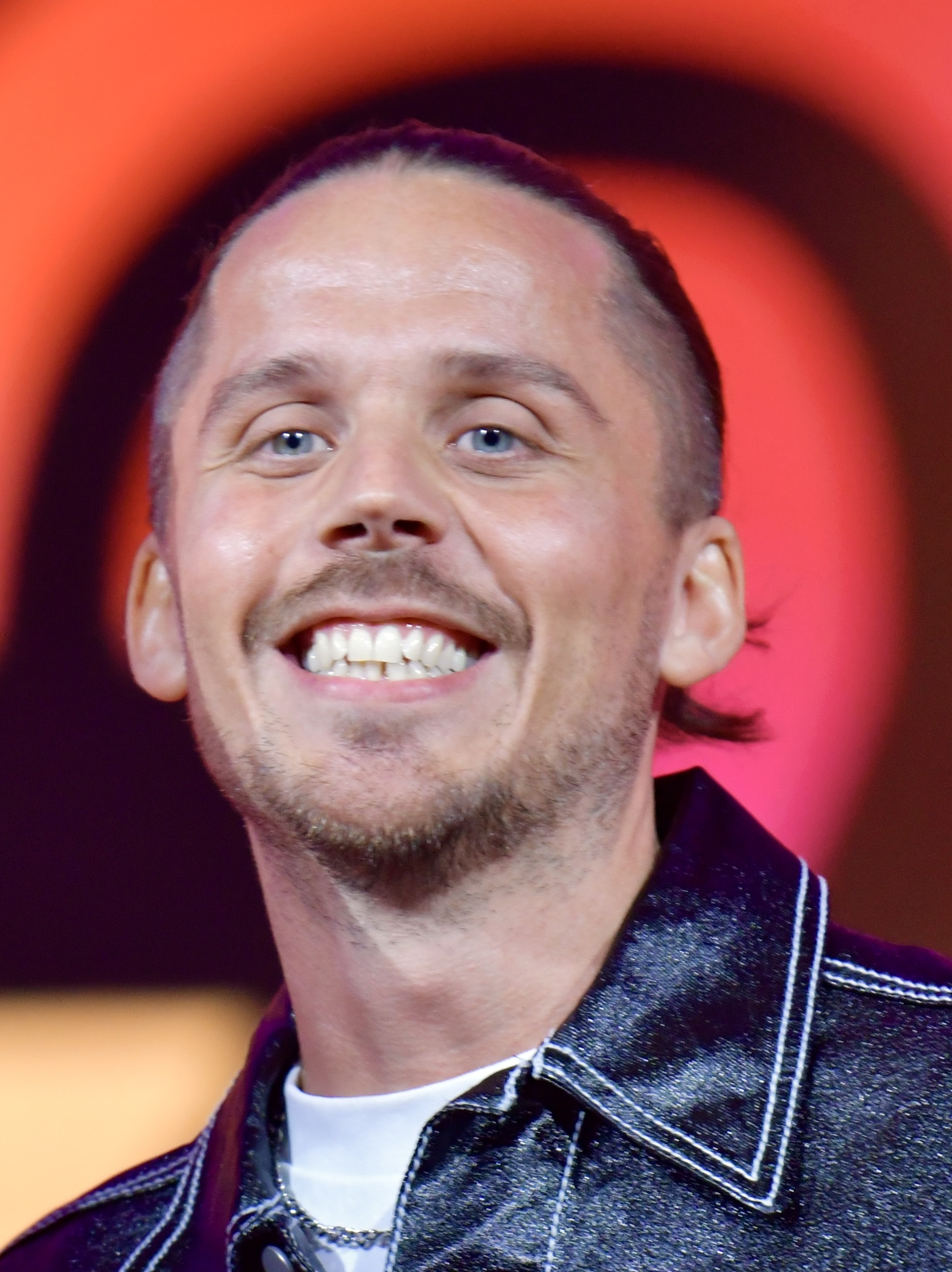
- Albin (2025)

Background information
- Also known as: Albin
- Born: 22 July 1989 (age 37); Boo, Sweden
- Genres: Hip hop; pop; house
- Occupations: Singer; rapper; songwriter
- Years active: 2013–present
- Label: Capitol Music Group Sweden

Albin Johnsén better known by the mononym Albin (born 22 July 1989, in Boo, Stockholm county) is a Swedish singer, rapper and songwriter. He gained fame with his 2014 song "Din soldat" that also featured vocals from Kristin Amparo and was co-written by Albin and Mattias Andréasson. The song reached number one on the Swedish Singles Chart. The follow-up "Vilken jävla smäll", featured by Amparo and co-written with Andréasson, was used in the soundtrack for the film Den perfekta stöten. Albin and Andréasson have further collaborated on the songs "Moment 22" and "Frank", the latter dedicated to Albin's son called Frank.

Albin was nominated for a number of awards including P3 Guld and the Swedish Grammies gala for best Swedish song for "Din soldat". Albin is a successful songwriter who has written for other artists, including "Losing Myself Without You" for Mollie Lindén during her time at Idol series and culminating as a single by her. He also wrote "Det rår vi inte för" for Behrang Miri that the latter performed during Melodifestivalen 2015 competition.

Albin and Andréasson took part in Melodifestivalen 2016 in a bid to represent Sweden in the Eurovision Song Contest with the song "Rik" as duo Albin & Mattias. After their performance on the first semi final of the competition on 6 February 2016, it moved to the "Andra Chansen" stage on 5 March 2016, where it lost to "Put Your Love On Me" by Boris René.

He participated in Melodifestivalen 2025 with the song ”Upp i luften” along with Pa Moudou Badjie.

== Discography ==
=== Albums ===
Title	Details	Peak chart positions	Certifications
Title	Details	SWE	Certifications
Dyra tårar	Released: 22 May 2015; Label: Universal; Format: Digital download	59	GLF: Gold
Du & jag för aldrig	Released: 13 April 2018; Label: Universal; Format: Digital download	25	
Kärnobyl	Released: 30 August 2019; Label: Universal; Format: Digital download	—	
"—" denotes an album that did not chart or was not released in that territory.

=== EPs ===
Title	Details
Din soldat	Released: 6 August 2014; Label: Universal; Format: Digital download
Frank	Released: 17 January 2015; Label: Universal; Format: Digital download

=== Singles ===
Title	Year	Peak chart positions	Certifications	Album	
Title	Year	SWE	Certifications	Album	
"1000 gånger bättre"	2013	—		Non-album singles	
"Även om"	2013	—		Non-album singles	
"Din soldat" (featuring Kristin Amparo)	2014	1	GLF: 8× Platinum	Din soldat EP and Dyra tårar	
"Moment 22" (with Mattias Andréasson)	2014	—		Din soldat EP and Dyra tårar	
"Vilken jävla smäll" (featuring Kristin Amparo)	2014	— (Note: "Vilken jävla smäll" did not enter the Swedish Singles Chart, but peaked at number 12 on the Swedish Heatseeker chart.)	GLF: Platinum	Frank EP	
"Frank" (with Mattias Andréasson)	2015	26	GLF: Platinum	Frank EP and Dyra tårar	
"En sista gång"	2015	67	GLF: Platinum	Dyra tårar	
"Rik" (with Mattias Andréasson)	2016	19	GLF: Platinum	Non-album singles	
"Hjärtan av guld" (featuring Joanné Nugas)	2018	—		Non-album singles	
"Jag håller av dig" (featuring Finess)	2019	—		Non-album singles	
"Trasig & vaken" (with Joanné Nugas)	2020	—		Non-album singles	
"Aldrig ge upp" (featuring Malin Christin)	2020	—		Non-album singles	
"Vi gjorde vårt bästa" (with Lovad)	2020	27	GLF: Platinum	Non-album singles	
"Kom närmre" (with Ellen Bergelin)	2020	—		Non-album singles	
"Fyrverkeri" (featuring Kristin Amparo)	2021	—		Non-album singles	
"Hur det känns att sakna"	2021	—		Non-album singles	
"T-shirt" (with Niklas Jeng)	2021	—		Non-album singles	
"Kunde va vi"	2021	—		Non-album singles	
"Hel"	2021	—		Non-album singles	—
"Upp i luften"	2025	26			"—" denotes a single that did not chart or was not released in that territory.

=== Writing credits ===
- 2014: "Losing Myself Without You" for Mollie Lindén
- 2015: "Det rår vi inte för" for Behrang Miri
- 2024: "Take My Breath Away" for Kim Cesarion
