= Albin (surname) =

Albin is a French, German, and English surname. Notable people with the surname include:

- Adolf Albin (1848–1920), Romanian chess player
- Barry T. Albin (born 1952), American judge
- Eleazar Albin (1680–1742), British naturalist and painter
- Emiliano Albín (born 1989), Uruguayan footballer
- Facundo Albin (born 1992), Argentine motorbike racer
- Fred Albin (1903–1968), American sound engineer
- Hans Albin (1905–1988), German actor and film producer
- Henry Albin (1624–1696), English minister
- Igor Albin (born 1966), Russian politician
- Juan Angel Albín (born 1986), Uruguayan footballer
- Peter S. Albin (1934–2008), American economist
- Susan Albin, American industrial engineer
- Tim Albin (born 1965), American football coach

== See also ==
- Alexandre Rousselin de Saint-Albin (1773–1847), French politician
