= Peter S. Albin =

American economist (1934–2008)

- Born: December 20, 1934; New York City, U.S.
- Died: February 20, 2008 (aged 73); New York City, U.S.
- Education: Yale University (BA); Princeton University (PhD)
- Known for: Application of complexity and games theory to social sciences
- Scientific career
- Fields: Economics
- Workplaces: Levy Institute of Bard College; John Jay College of the City University of New York
- Doctoral advisor: William Baumol

Peter Steigman Albin (December 20, 1934 – February 20, 2008) was an American economist who wrote and taught primarily in New York City. Among other contributions, he was known for applying cellular automata in the social sciences.

== Career ==
Peter S. Albin earned his Bachelor of Arts, from Yale College in 1956 and Doctor of Philosophy from Princeton University in 1964, both in economics.

Albin was a professor of economics at New York University from 1960 to 1974, and Chairman of the Economics Department of John Jay College of the City University of New York from 1974 to 1991. He taught and performed research at the Levy Economics Institute. He was visiting professor at the University of Göttingen in 1979–1980, the University of California, Berkeley in 1972–1973, he taught at the Sorbonne, at Cambridge University (1968–1969), at the Institute of Advanced Studies (Vienna) (1977–1979).

Additionally, he was a partner in the asset management and investment advisory firm, the Unicorn Group, for many years.

== Writings ==
=== Books ===
- (with Duncan K. Foley) Barriers and Bounds to Rationality: essays on economic complexity and dynamics in interactive systems Princeton, New Jersey. : Princeton University Press, 1998. ISBN 978-0-691-02676-3. Held at 257 WorldCat libraries
- Progress Without Poverty: Socially Responsible Economic Growth New York: Basic Books, 1978 ISBN 978-0-465-06407-6. Held at 465 World Cat libraries
- "The Analysis of Complex Socio-Economic Systems" Lexington, Massachusetts : Lexington Books, [1975]. ISBN 978-0-669-96636-7 Held at 265 WorldCat libraries

=== Journal articles ===
Albin's articles have appeared in the American Economic Review, the Journal of Economic Literature, and many other publications.
