= Rukkle =

Rukkle is a multimedia publication devoted to coverage of popular culture stories from around the world with a focus on television, music, movies and viral videos. The website is divided into three parts: rukkle.com (blog), rukkle.fm (radio station) and rukkle.tv (YouTube video channel). The website was founded in 2010 by Dave Alsybury who lives in Carlow, Ireland. The site was awarded the 'Big Mouth' award at the 2011 Eircom Spiders in November 2011.

== Recurring Blog Features ==
- 5 Things You Don't Need To Know Today: The blogs daily article highlighting five pop culture stories that are of no importance, but are some of the most topical of the day.
  1. Viral: Many of the posts on the blog highlight new viral videos. These are highlighted with the hashtag #Viral after the post title.
- The rukkitty : A sporadic article that features the internets most viral commodity, cats.
- What We Learned This Week: An article written and published on Fridays that highlights the five biggest stories of the week.
- The Week In Trending Trailers: An article written and published on Fridays that highlights the weeks top trending trailers on Twitter.

== Internet Radio Station ==
rukkle.fm is a streaming internet radio station. The station plays Top 40 music from around the world and is peppered with information on the main stories of the day on rukkle.com

== TV Video Channel ==
rukkle.tv is a video channel operated on the YouTube platform by rukkle. The channel has yet to commence production of videos. According to the blog, these videos will commence in "a few weeks".

== Awards ==
rukkle was awarded the 'Big Mouth' award at the Eircom Spider Awards in November 2011. The award is presented to the website with the biggest voice online each year and it is voted for by the public.
