= Gertrude Goodrich =

American painter

- Goodrich of the National New Deal Preservation Association addresses the evening gathering after the symposium. March 14, 2008.
- Born: 1914; New York City
- Died: 2017 (aged 102–103); New Jersey
- Known for: Painting

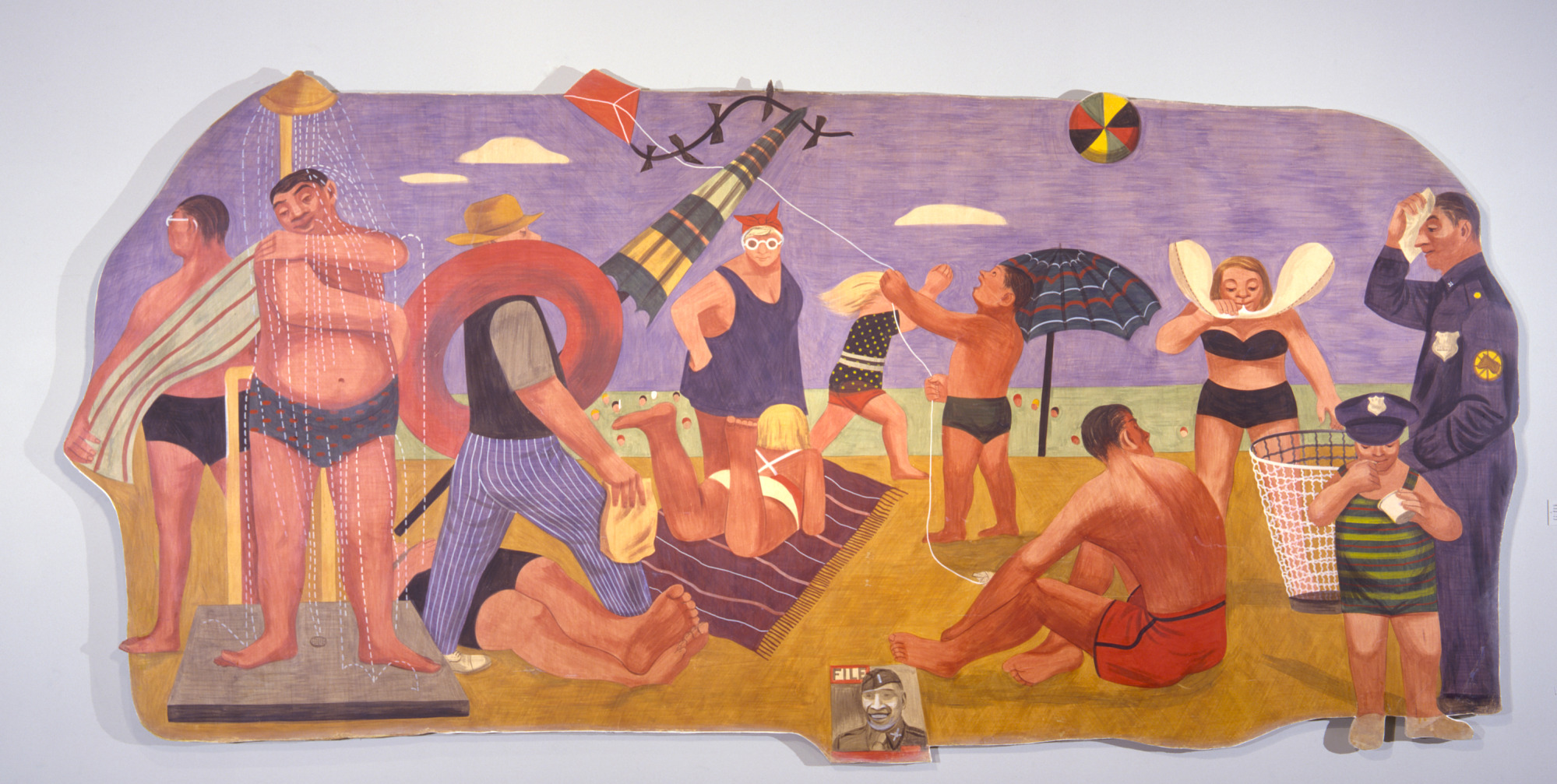
Scenes of American Life (Beach)

Gertrude Simone Goodrich (1914–2017) was an American painter and writer, whose style has been described as "primitive".

Goodrich was born in New York City in 1914. During her career, she produced work for New Deal art projects. Among these was a mural, Production, for the post office in Buchanan, Michigan, created in 1941. The mural was later painted over, but a plan for its restoration has been put together. Its place has been taken by a copy of a preliminary sketch. Goodrich painted another mural for the cafeteria of the United States Department of Health and Human Services building in Washington, D.C.; titled Scenes of American Life (Beach) and painted in dry pigment in beeswax emulsion on shaped canvas between 1941 and 1947, it is now in the collection of the Smithsonian American Art Museum, alongside a number of related works. The museum also houses a study for the Buchanan post office mural. Some sources erroneously provide a death date of 1980, however, the Archives of American Art conducted an oral interview with Goordich in 2008. She died in New Jersey in August 2017 at the age of 102.
