= Buchanan, Michigan =

- City
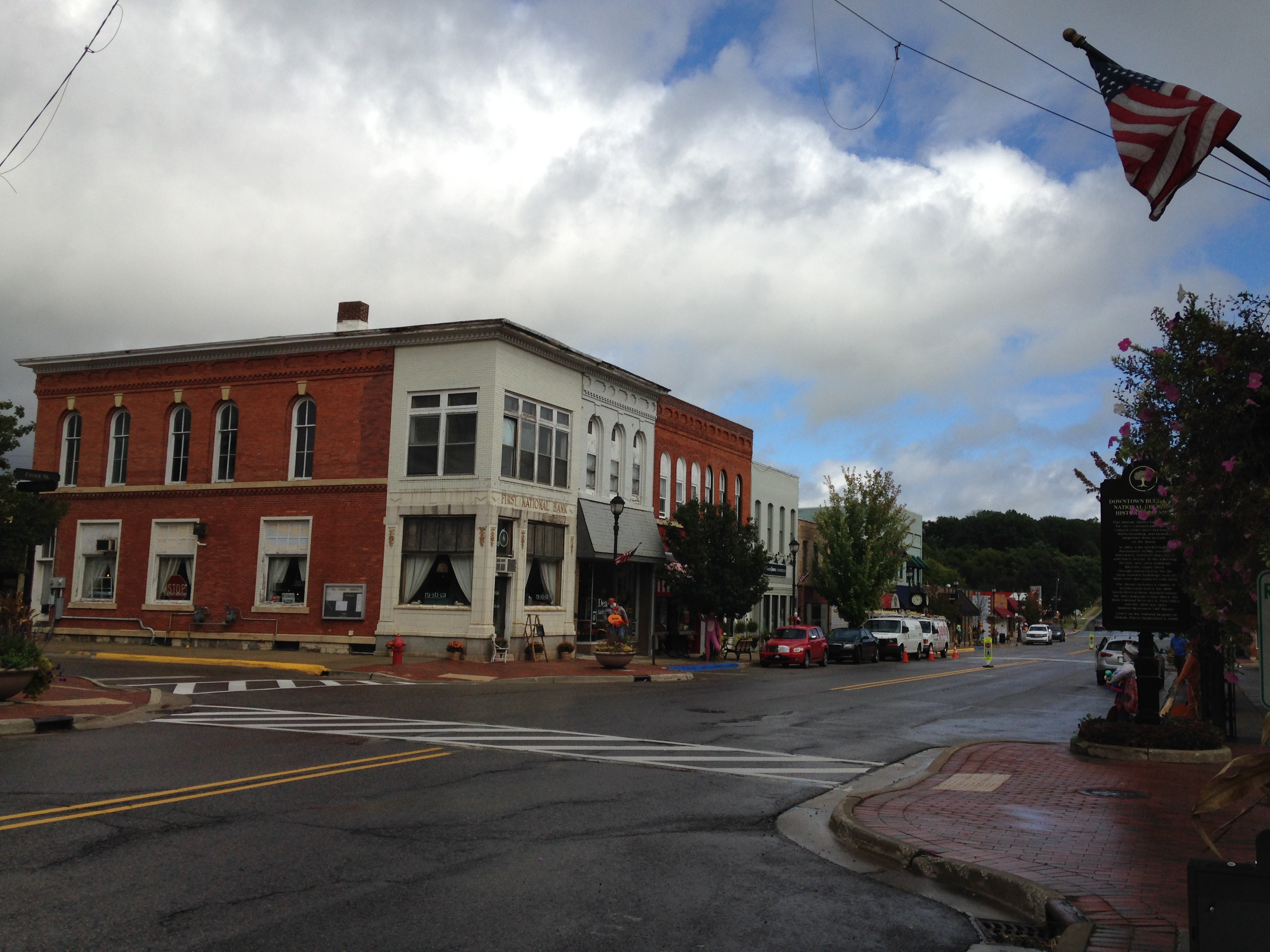
- Buchanan Downtown Historic District
- Motto: "Life is better here."
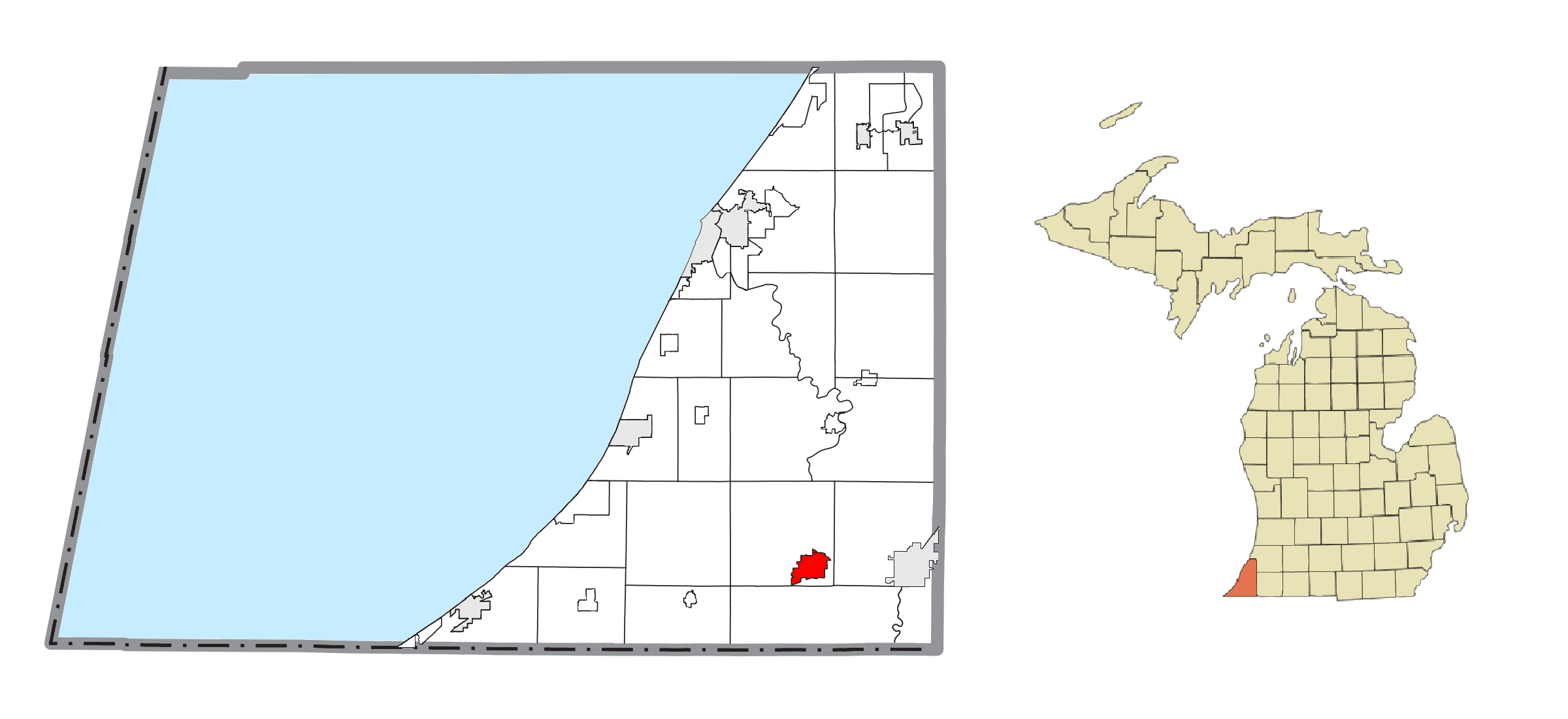
- Location within Berrien County

- Location within the state of Michigan
- Coordinates: 41°49′39″N 86°21′41″W
- Country: United States
- State: Michigan
- County: Berrien

Government
  - Type: City commission
  - Mayor: Mark Weedon

Area
  - Total: 2.59 sq mi (6.71 km^{2})
  - Land: 2.52 sq mi (6.53 km^{2})
  - Water: 0.069 sq mi (0.18 km^{2})
- Elevation: 696 ft (212 m)

Population (2020)
  - Total: 4,300
  - Density: 1,704.7/sq mi (658.19/km^{2})
- Time zone: UTC−5 (Eastern (EST))
  - Summer (DST): UTC−4 (EDT)
- ZIP code(s): 49107
- Area code: 269
- FIPS code: 26-11400
- GNIS feature ID: 1618891
- Website: Official website

Buchanan is a city in Berrien County in the U.S. state of Michigan. The population was 4,300 at the 2020 census. The city is located at the southeast corner of Buchanan Township, about 5 miles (8.0 km) west of Niles.

== History ==
The community was named after James Buchanan, the 15th President of the United States. Popularly known as "Redbud City" because of the many redbud trees that have historically lined city streets and the major approaches to the city, Buchanan has long been recognized as a Tree City USA by the National Arbor Day Foundation.

The area, already having been populated by Native Americans in places such as the Moccasin Bluff site, was first settled in 1833 at the spot where McCoy Creek meets the St. Joseph River. The village of Buchanan was platted in 1842 and incorporated in 1858.

In 1941, as part of the Section of Fine Arts arts projects, Gertrude Goodrich painted a mural, Production, in the Buchanan post office. Later painted over, it is in the process of being restored.

On April 12, 1979, farms, houses and mobile homes just north of the city were damaged by an F2 tornado. There were no deaths but several residences sustained significant damage.

== Geography ==
According to the United States Census Bureau, the city has a total area of 2.57 square miles (6.66 km^{2}), of which 2.50 square miles (6.47 km^{2}) is land and 0.07 square miles (0.18 km^{2}) is water.

== Demographics ==
Historical population
Census	Pop.	Note	%±
1870	1,702		—
1880	1,894		11.3%
1890	1,994		5.3%
1900	1,708		−14.3%
1910	1,831		7.2%
1920	3,187		74.1%
1930	3,922		23.1%
1940	4,056		3.4%
1950	5,224		28.8%
1960	5,341		2.2%
1970	4,645		−13.0%
1980	5,142		10.7%
1990	4,992		−2.9%
2000	4,681		−6.2%
2010	4,456		−4.8%
2020	4,300		−3.5%
U.S. Decennial Census

=== 2020 census ===
As of the 2020 census, Buchanan had a population of 4,300. The median age was 38.8 years. 22.6% of residents were under the age of 18 and 16.9% of residents were 65 years of age or older. For every 100 females there were 92.7 males, and for every 100 females age 18 and over there were 88.6 males age 18 and over.

99.2% of residents lived in urban areas, while 0.8% lived in rural areas.

There were 1,904 households in Buchanan, of which 27.4% had children under the age of 18 living in them. Of all households, 35.2% were married-couple households, 21.6% were households with a male householder and no spouse or partner present, and 34.0% were households with a female householder and no spouse or partner present. About 37.6% of all households were made up of individuals and 16.4% had someone living alone who was 65 years of age or older.

There were 2,077 housing units, of which 8.3% were vacant. The homeowner vacancy rate was 0.6% and the rental vacancy rate was 5.0%.

Racial composition as of the 2020 census
Race	Number	Percent
White	3,502	81.4%
Black or African American	240	5.6%
American Indian and Alaska Native	50	1.2%
Asian	26	0.6%
Native Hawaiian and Other Pacific Islander	1	0.0%
Some other race	81	1.9%
Two or more races	400	9.3%
Hispanic or Latino (of any race)	209	4.9%

=== 2010 census ===
As of the census of 2010, there were 4,456 people, 1,901 households, and 1,136 families residing in the city. The population density was 1,782.4 inhabitants per square mile (688.2/km^{2}). There were 2,139 housing units at an average density of 855.6 per square mile (330.3/km^{2}). The racial makeup of the city was 86.6% White, 7.5% African American, 1.2% Native American, 0.3% Asian, 1.3% from other races, and 3.1% from two or more races. Hispanic or Latino of any race were 3.3% of the population.

There were 1,901 households, of which 31.5% had children under the age of 18 living with them, 40.1% were married couples living together, 13.3% had a female householder with no husband present, 6.4% had a male householder with no wife present, and 40.2% were non-families. 34.8% of all households were made up of individuals, and 14.9% had someone living alone who was 65 years of age or older. The average household size was 2.34 and the average family size was 3.01.

The median age in the city was 37.6 years. 24.6% of residents were under the age of 18; 9.3% were between the ages of 18 and 24; 26.3% were from 25 to 44; 25.6% were from 45 to 64; and 14.3% were 65 years of age or older. The gender makeup of the city was 48.1% male and 51.9% female.

=== 2000 census ===
As of the 2000 census, there were 4,681 people, 1,915 households, and 1,191 families in the city. The population density was 1,950.8 inhabitants per square mile (753.2/km^{2}). There were 2,098 housing units, for an average density of 874.3 per square mile (337.6/km^{2}). The racial makeup of the city was 86.26% White, 10.23% African American, 1.92% multiracial, 0.60% other races, 0.51% Asian, and 0.47% Native American. Hispanics or Latinos of any race were 1.84% of the population.

There were 1,915 households, out of which 30.9% had children under the age of 18 living with them, 44.5% were married couples living together, 13.3% had a female householder with no husband present, and 37.8% were non-families. 32.0% of all households were made up of individuals, and 14.7% had someone living alone who was 65 years of age or older. The average household size was 2.41 and the average family size was 3.05.

The age structure of the population was diffuse, with 25.6% under the age of 18, 9.6% aged 18–24, 29.0% aged 25–44, 21.3% aged 45–64, and 14.5% 65 years of age or older. The median age was 35. Sex ratio was skewed toward females, with 87.5 males for every 100 females of all ages and 83.1 males for every 100 females 18 years or older.

Median income was $34,244 for a household and $43,860 for a family. Males had a median income of $32,950 versus $21,857 for females. Per capita income was $16,600. About 10.9% of families and 12.4% of the population were below the poverty line, including 14.7% of those younger than 18 and 10.7% of those older than 64.

== Economy ==
Buchanan was historically known as the headquarters for Clark Equipment Company, a manufacturer of truck axles, fork lift trucks, front-end loaders, and other heavy machinery. The company was formed in 1916 out of an acquisition of two other Buchanan companies. Clark left the area in the 1990s, forcing the city to diversify, and a number of smaller businesses took over the buildings Clark essentially donated to the city.

Electro-Voice, a manufacturer of high quality audio equipment such as microphones, amplifiers and loudspeakers, was also headquartered in Buchanan.

== Arts and culture ==
=== Attractions ===
Pears Mill, a flour mill using the water power of the swiftly flowing McCoy Creek, was built in 1857 and still stands. It is open during the summer for visitors.

The Tin Shop Theatre, located near Pears Mill, is a small theater with performances in the summer. The seasons run into September and a variety of shows for everyone of any age and any occasion are performed there.

Roti Roti Art Center, located at 117 W Front St, Buchanan, MI 49107, holds art shows and fundraisers all year round.

The historic Ross Sanders House sits at 107 W Front St, Buchanan, MI 49107, and has served multiple functions over its 150-year lifespan. It was at one point city hall, the library, the police station, an escape room, a hair salon, and most recently a non-profit office.

Red Bud MX is a racetrack opened in 1973 that hosts a round of the AMA Motocross Championship on the Independence Day weekend.

Many other attractions are located in surrounding Buchanan Township.

== Education ==
Buchanan Community Schools consists of two elementary schools, Ottawa and Moccasin (grades K-4), Buchanan Middle School (grades 5–7), and Buchanan High School.

== Infrastructure ==
=== Transportation ===
Buchanan is located 1.5 miles (2.4 km) north of US 12, 2.3 miles (3.7 km) west of US 31, 9.3 miles (15.0 km) north of the US 31 interchange on the Indiana Toll Road (I-80|I-90), and 20 miles (32 km) east of I-94 (exit 4 via US 12).

The nearest rail hubs are the Amtrak stations at Niles and New Buffalo, and the South Shore Line station in South Bend, Indiana.

Commercial air service is provided by the South Bend International Airport, with flights to larger hubs such as Atlanta, Chicago O’Hare, Cincinnati, Cleveland, Detroit, Las Vegas, Minneapolis-St. Paul, Orlando, and St. Petersburg-Clearwater.

== Notable people ==
- Peggy Cramer, All-American Girls Professional Baseball League player for the South Bend Blue Sox, born in Buchanan
- Izzi Dame (Franki Strefling), WWE wrestler
- Virgil Exner, influential automobile designer for Studebaker, lived in Buchanan during his youth and graduated from Buchanan High School
- John Grant, singer-songwriter born in Buchanan
- Jack "Sky" Knight, aviation pioneer
- Cary Moon, urban planner and politician
- Harry Niles, outfielder and second baseman for St. Louis Browns, New York Highlanders, Boston Red Sox, and Cleveland Naps; born in Buchanan
- Jackson Scholz, the 200-m sprint champion in the 1924 Olympics (portrayed in the film Chariots of Fire), also a successful author; born in Buchanan
- Jay Town, United States District Attorney, raised in Buchanan and graduated from Buchanan High School
- Hannah Roberts, American BMX freestyle cyclist raised in Buchanan and graduated from Buchanan High School. She is a three time world champion in the UCI Urban Cycling World Championships and silver medalist in freestyle BMX at the Tokyo 2020 Olympics.

== See also ==
- List of cities in Michigan
