= Dewey Albinson =

American painter

Ernest Dewey Albinson
- Born: March 9, 1898; Minneapolis, Minnesota
- Died: March 1971 (aged 72–73); Jalisco, Mexico
- Occupation: Artist
- Years active: 1920s-1950s

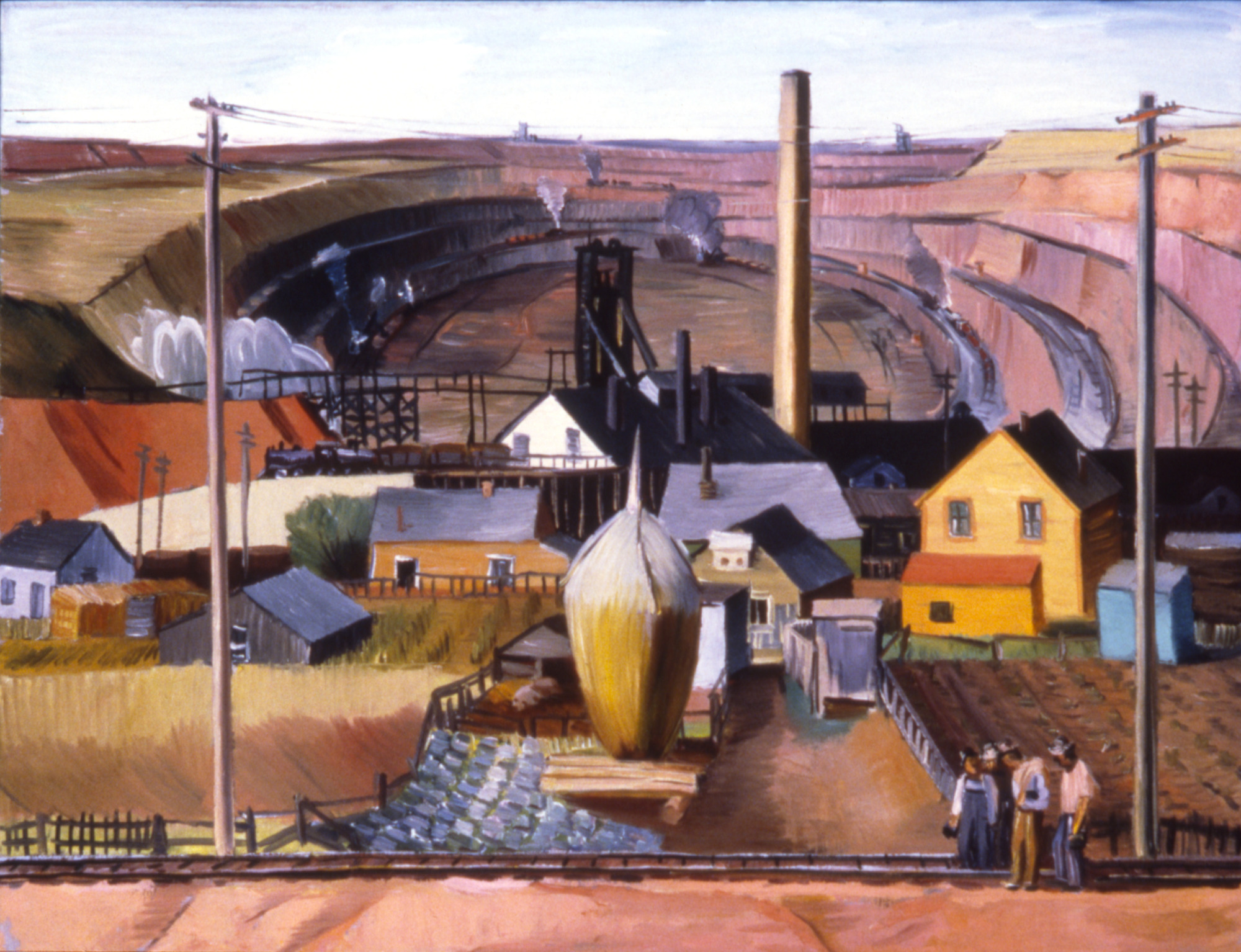
Northern Minnesota Mine (1934), one of Albinson's paintings for the Public Works of Art Project

Ernest Dewey Albinson (March 9, 1898 in Minneapolis, Minnesota – 1971 in Jalisco, Mexico) was an American artist. Minnesota historian Theodore Christian Blegen called him "a gifted painter of North Shore scenes."

== Early life and education ==
Albinson was the son of Swedish immigrant parents.

He studied at the Minneapolis School of Art in 1919, and at the Art Students League on a scholarship. He lived in France from 1923 to 1925.

== Career ==
He was the director and teacher at the Saint Paul School for Art, from 1926 to 1929. From 1929 to 1931, he lived in Italy, then moved to New York in 1932.

In 1933, he worked for the Public Works of Art Project, and in 1934 his painting Northern Minnesota Mine was exhibited at the Corcoran Gallery of Art, and toured the country. He was a project director for the Minnesota State Department of Education, from 1935 to 1937. He painted murals for post offices in Cloquet, Minnesota, and Marquette, Michigan. He was president of the Minnesota Art Association from 1937 to 1938. From 1939 to 1941, he lived in Quebec.

From the 1920s to the 1940s, he would frequently spend summers in Grand Portage, Minnesota painting scenes of the Lake Superior North Shore and the local Ojibwe culture. One frequent subject was a gnarled cedar tree on the lakeshore, known by local Indians as "Spirit Little Cedar Tree." Albinson, however, titled his first painting in his series Witch Tree, and so it has also become known by that name.

After returning to Minnesota, he moved to Stockton, New Jersey (to live near his friend, painter B.J.O. Nordfeldt), and finally to Nayarit, Jalisco, Mexico in 1953.

His work is in the Smithsonian American Art Museum, San Diego Museum of Art, Minneapolis Institute of Art, University of Michigan Museum of Art, and Frederick R Weisman Art Museum.
