= Albin Sandqvist =

Swedish singer

- Occupation: musician

Albin Sandqvist also known by the mononym Albin is a solo Swedish singer. He was part of the Swedish band Star Pilots, a solo electronic / dance pop act.

Albin has also pursued a solo career and in 2005 had a solo hit single "I'll Be Waiting". The maxi single included backing vocals by Marcus Öhrn and Sussie Ottebring with Lee Farmer on guitar. The maxi single also had a remix of the track by Punkstar.

== Discography ==
=== Singles ===
Year	Title	Peak positions	Album
Year	Title	SWE	Album
2005	"I'll Be Waiting"	10	
