= Lakeside =

Lakeside or Lake Side may refer to:

== Places ==
=== Australia ===
- Lakeside College, Pakenham, Victoria
- Lakeside Joondalup shopping centre Joondalup, Western Australia
- Lakeside, near Reservoir, Victoria
- Lakeside International Raceway, Pine Rivers, Queensland
- Lakeside Mental Hospital, formerly known as Ballarat Lunatic Asylum, Ballarat, Victoria
- Lakeside railway station, Melbourne, on the Puffing Billy Railway
- Lakeside, Queensland, a locality in the North Burnett Region

=== Canada ===
- Lakeside, Nova Scotia, just outside Halifax
- Lakeside, New Brunswick
- Lakeside, Kenora District, Ontario
- Lakeside, Oxford County, Ontario
- Lakeside (electoral district), a political district
- Rural Municipality of Lakeside No. 338, Saskatchewan, a rural municipality

=== Malaysia ===
- Lakeside Campus, Taylor's University, Subang Jaya

=== New Zealand ===
- Lakeside, New Zealand, a locality in Selwyn District

=== Singapore ===
- Lakeside MRT station, an above-ground Mass Rapid Transit station on the East West MRT line in Jurong West

=== South Africa ===
- Lakeside, Johannesburg

=== United Kingdom ===
- Lakeside, Cardiff, near Cyncoed, Wales
- Lakeside, Cumbria, at the southern end of Windermere, England
- Lakeside, Llanelli, Wales
- Lakeside, Worcestershire, England
- Lakeside Arts Centre, part of the Force Majeure comedy tour, Nottingham, England
- Lakeside Leisure Complex, Frimley Green, Surrey, host of the BDO World Darts Championship
- Lakeside Shopping Centre, Thurrock

=== United States ===
- Lakeside, Arizona
- Lakeside Lake, Tucson, Arizona
- Lakeside, Arkansas
- Lakeside, California, an unincorporated suburb of San Diego
- Lakeside, California, former name of Stateline, California
- Lakeside, Connecticut
- Lakeside, Colorado
- Lakeside, Florida
- Lakeside, Georgia
- Lakeside, Iowa
- Lakeside (Batchelor, Louisiana), listed on the NRHP in Pointe Coupee Parish, Louisiana
- Lakeside, Shreveport, Louisiana
- Lakeside, Berrien County, Michigan
- Lakeside, Genesee County, Michigan
- Lakeside, Macomb County, Michigan
- Lakeside – Lester Park (Duluth), Minnesota
- Lakeside, Minnesota
- Lakeside Township, Minnesota (disambiguation), multiple locations
- Lakeside, Missouri
- Lakeside, Montana
- Lakeside, Nebraska
- Lakeside, Ohio
- Lakeside, Oregon
- Lakeside, San Patricio County, Texas
- Lakeside, Tarrant County, Texas
- Lakeside, Virginia
- Lakeside, Washington
- Lakeside, Wisconsin
- Lakeside Amusement Park, a family-owned amusement park in Lakeside, Colorado
- Lakeside Amusement Park (Virginia), a defunct amusement park
- Lakeside Drive, Washoe County, Nevada
- Lakeside Inn (Lakeside, Michigan), a historic hotel
- Lakeside Mall, Sterling Heights, Michigan
- Lakeside Mountains, Utah
- Lakeside Lake, Tucson, Arizona
- Lakeside Park (Owasco, New York), a historic "pleasure ground" park
- Lake Side Power Station, Vineyard, Utah
- Lake-Side Terrace Apartments, Chicago, Illinois

== Other uses ==
- Lakeside (band), a funk band
  - Lakeside (album), a 1977 album by the band
- Lakeside Hammers, a speedway team who race in the British National League
- Lakeside Murders, a Finnish crime drama television series
- Lakeside Nature Reserve, a nature reserve in Finchley, London
- Lakeside Press, a Chicago publishing imprint under which the RR Donnelley Company
  - Lakeside Press Building, a historic commercial building in downtown Chicago, Illinois
- Lakeside Records, the name of at least two different record companies

== See also ==
- Lake side road or esplanade
- Lakeside Academy (disambiguation)
- Lakeside Cemetery (disambiguation)
- Lakeside Country Club (disambiguation)
- Lakeside Elementary School (disambiguation)
- Lakeside Garden (disambiguation)
- Lakeside Golf Course (disambiguation)
- Lakeside High School (disambiguation)
- Lakeside Inn (disambiguation)
- Lakeside Park (disambiguation)
- Lakeside School (disambiguation)
- Lakeside School District (disambiguation)
- Lakeside station (disambiguation)
- Lakeside Village (disambiguation)
