= Lakeside School District =

Lakeside School District may refer to:

- Lakeside School District, based in Hot Springs, Arkansas
- Lakeside School District, based in Lake Village, Arkansas

== See also ==
- Lakeside Union School District (disambiguation)
- Lakeside School (disambiguation)
- Lakeside High School (disambiguation)
- Lakeside School District (disambiguation)
- Lakeside (disambiguation)
- Lakeside Academy (disambiguation)
- Lakeside College
