= Lakeside Village =

Lakeside Village may refer to:

- Lakeside Village, Doncaster, an outlet shopping centre in Doncaster, South Yorkshire, England
- Lakeside Village (Lakeland), an open-air shopping mall in Lakeland, Florida, United States
- Lakeside Village, Kansas, an unincorporated community in Jefferson County, Kansas, United States
- Lakeside Village, Oklahoma, a census-designated place in Comanche County, Oklahoma, United States
- Lakeside Village, Virginia, an unincorporated community in Cumberland County, Virginia, United States

== See also ==
- Lakeside (disambiguation)
