= Horace B. Pomeroy =

Horace Burton Pomeroy (June 3, 1879 – January 24, 1957) was an American broker and investment banker with Schoellkopf, Hutton & Pomeroy.

== Early life ==
Pomeroy was born on June 3, 1879, in Troy, Pennsylvania. He was a son of Charles Burton Pomeroy (1839–1921) and Sophia (née Webber) Pomeroy (1841–1905).

He attended the Lawrenceville School in Mercer County, New Jersey before attending Yale University where he graduated with a B.A. degree in 1903 and an M.A. degree in 1906.

== Career ==
In 1912, Pomeroy became the Rochester, New York representative of Harris, Forbes & Co. of New York City, the investment banking affiliate of Harris Bank that was incorporated in 1911.

On January 1, 1921, Pomeroy withdrew from Harris Forbes & Co., as Western New York manager, in charge of their Buffalo office, to join Schoellkopf, Hutton & Co. (founded in Buffalo in 1919), which then became Schoellkopf, Hutton & Pomeroy. They became one of the "strongest investment banking houses between New York and Chicago. The active members of the firm consisted of Jacob F. Schoellkopf Jr., Russell J. H. Hutton, and Pomeroy. He served as treasurer, secretary and a member of the board of directors. In 1930, he received an annual salary of $20,000 per year and owned 600 shares of the company. Pomeroy also served as vice president and a director of the Niagara Share Corporation of Maryland (a holding company for the Schoellkopf family utility interests in various entities including the Niagara Falls Hydraulic Power and Manufacturing Company).

In 1960, after his retirement and later death, the investment banking activities of the Schoellkopf, Hutton & Pomeroy merged with the New York City based firm Dominick & Dominick.

== Personal life ==
On November 17, 1909, Pomeroy was married to Ethel Josephine Braman (1882–1931), a daughter of Josephine Adele (née Clark) Braman and Chester Alwyn Braman of New York City, president of A.D. Julliard Co. Together, they resided at 550 Lafayette Avenue in Buffalo, (Note: Pomeroy's home at 550 Lafayette Avenue in Buffalo was built in 1906 for Adolph Spangenthal and is "s a unique example of a 2 1/2-story, urban, brick mixed Second Empire styled residence with high detail." Today, it is a contributing building of the Richmond Avenue - Ashland Avenue Historic District.) and were the parents of four children:

- Horace Burton Pomeroy Jr. (b. 1910)
- Lawrence Pomeroy (1913–1992), a prominent lawyer who married Aloyise Haskins.
- Josephine Adele Pomeroy (b. 1919-2013)
- Braman Pomeroy (1920–2003), the president of Lexington Wood Products Corp.; he married Janet Fuller and, after her death c. 1990, he married Marion Flemming.

He was a member of the Buffalo Club, the Ellicott Club, the Yale Club of New York City and was an elder of the North Presbyterian Church of Buffalo.

Pomeroy died on January 24, 1957, in Vero Beach, Florida.
