= Lakeside High School =

Lakeside High School can refer to several different schools:

- Lakeside High School (Hot Springs, Arkansas)
- Lakeside High School (Lake Village, Arkansas)
- Lakeside High School (Lake Elsinore, California)
- Lakeside High School (DeKalb County, Georgia)
- Lakeside High School (Evans, Georgia)
- Lakeside High School (Plummer, Idaho)
- Lakeside High School (Downs, Kansas)
- Lakeside High School (Wilmington, North Carolina)
- Lakeside High School (Ashtabula, Ohio)
- Lakeside High School (Nine Mile Falls, Washington), Nine Mile Falls, Washington
- Lakeside Junior-Senior High School (Sibley, Louisiana)
- Lakeside School (Seattle)

== See also ==
- Lakeside School (disambiguation)
- Lakeside School District (disambiguation)
- Lakeside (disambiguation)
- Lakeside Academy (disambiguation)
- Lakeside College
