= Lakeside School =

Lakeside School may refer to:

- Lakeside School (Seattle), a private school in Washington, United States
- Lakeside School, Chandler's Ford, a special school in Hampshire, England

== See also ==
- Lakeside High School (disambiguation)
- Lakeside School District (disambiguation)
- Lakeside (disambiguation)
- Lakeside Academy (disambiguation)
- Lakeside College
