= Lakeside Cemetery =

Lakeside Cemetery may refer to:

- Lakeside Cemetery (Port Huron, Michigan), cemetery in United States
- Lakeside Cemetery (Hamburg, New York), cemetery in United States
- Carpenter, Lakeside, and Springvale Cemeteries, cemeteries in East Providence, Rhode Island, United States

== See also ==
- Lakeside Cemetery Chapel in Lakeside Cemetery, Wakefield, Massachusetts, United States
