= Lakeside Academy =

Lakeside Academy may refer to:

== Canada ==
- Lakeside Academy (Lachine), school in Lachine, Montreal, Quebec, Canada
- Lakeside Academy (Buchans), school in Nova Central School District in Buchans, Newfoundland and Labrador, Canada

== United Kingdom ==
- Telford Park School, Telford, Shropshire, known as Lakeside Academy 2013-2015

== United States ==
- Lakeside Academy (Belle Glade), school in Belle Glade, Florida, USA

== See also ==
- Lakeside School (disambiguation)
- Lakeside High School (disambiguation)
- Lakeside (disambiguation)
- Lakeside College
