= Lakeside Township, Minnesota =

Lakeside Township is the name of some places in the U.S. state of Minnesota:

- Lakeside Township, Aitkin County, Minnesota
- Lakeside Township, Cottonwood County, Minnesota

== See also ==
- Lakeside Township (disambiguation)
