= Lakeside, South Yorkshire =

Suburb of Doncaster, South Yorkshire, England

Coordinates: 53.510914°N 1.103529°W

Lakeside
- Suburb
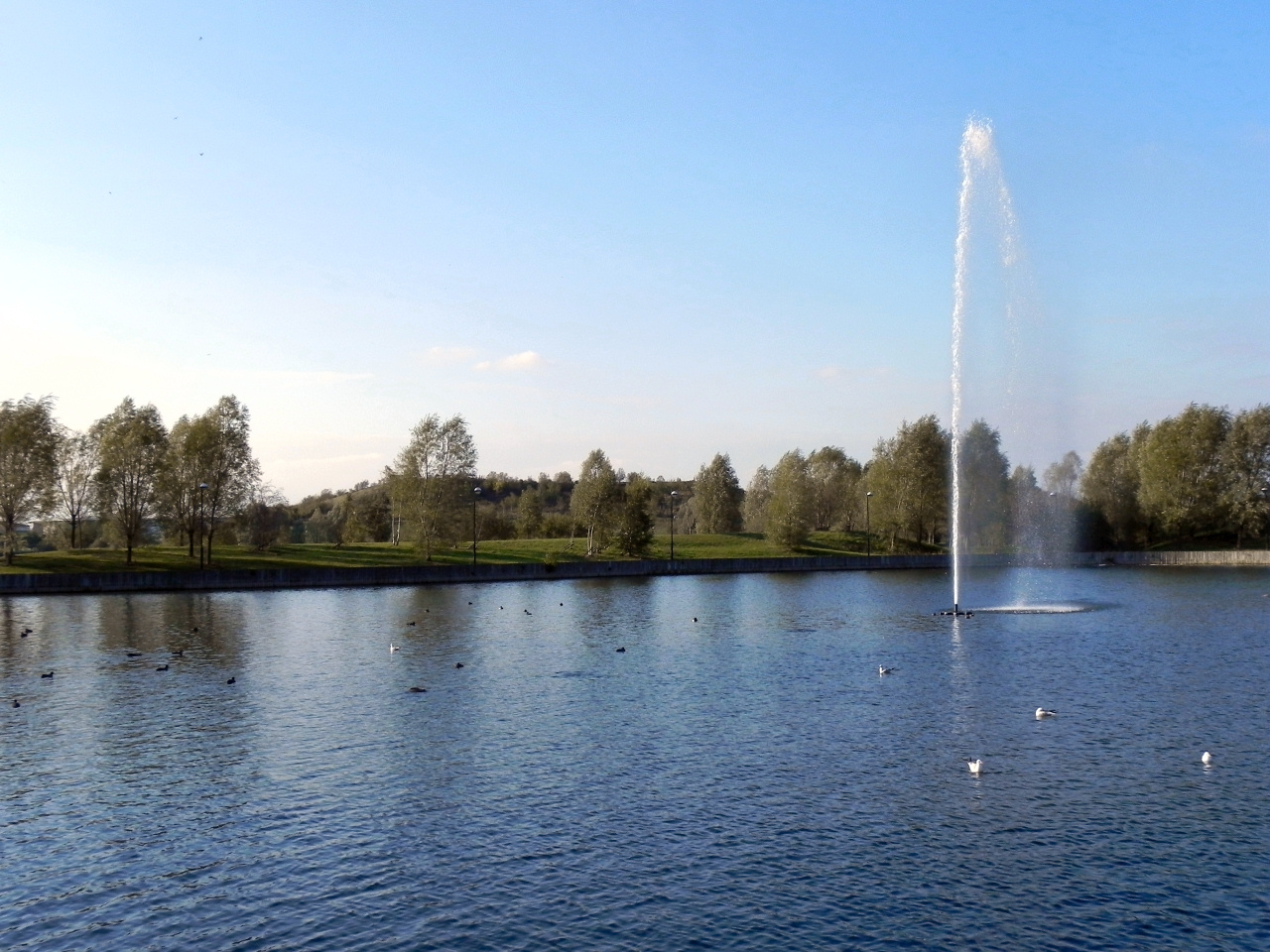
- Fountain on the lake

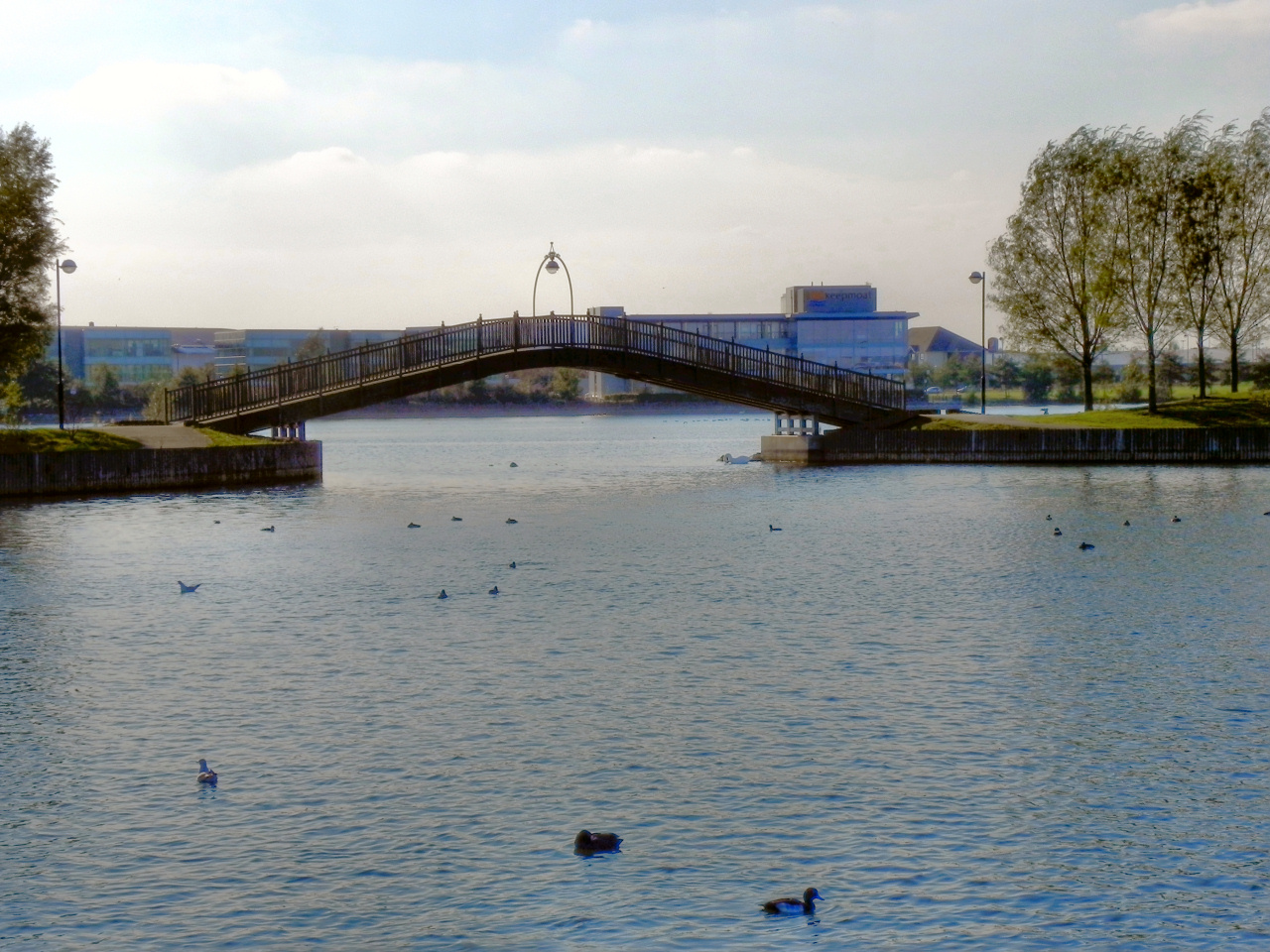
- Bridge over the lake

- Location within Borough of Doncaster Location within South Yorkshire
- Metropolitan borough: Doncaster
- Metropolitan county: South Yorkshire
- Region: Yorkshire and the Humber
- Country: England
- Sovereign state: United Kingdom
- Post town: Doncaster
- Postcode district: DN4
- Dialling code: 01302
- Police: South Yorkshire
- Fire: South Yorkshire
- Ambulance: Yorkshire
- UK Parliament: Doncaster Central

Lakeside is a suburb of Doncaster, South Yorkshire, England, centred around a circular lake. Approximately 2 miles (3.2 km) south-east of central Doncaster, it has recently seen new development and modernisation with the construction of several new luxury housing estates, a leisure park with restaurants, a cinema, and a bowling alley, the Herten Triangle, which has more eateries and fast food establishments, the Lakeside Village shopping centre, and the Eco-Power Stadium. The area has settled vegetation, paths, bridges, notice boards and space for public gatherings around the lake.

It is split between the Town and Bessacarr and Cantley wards within the Metropolitan Borough of Doncaster. Lakeside borders Bessacarr to the east, Belle Vue to the north, Balby to the west, and Potteric Carr to the south.

== Wildlife ==
Many species of bird and fish have established themselves here and the nearby Potteric Carr Nature Reserve, which offers bat, spider and other guided tours, has included this area in its extended walks about wildlife in the area.

=== Birds ===
Several species have been recorded here, including Gadwall, Canada Geese, Moorhens, Cormorants, mallard, Tufted ducks, Northern Shovellers, Gulls, Coots, Great crested Grebe, Sand Martin, Temminck's Stint and Pochards. Raptors have also been seen here, including Osprey, Kestrel and Horned owl.

Mallard duck in flight	Shovellers and pochard ducks	Adult and young coot and eggs	Tufted ducks	Crested grebes

This lake is home to a flock of mute swans which have the gene for leucism.

Left, mute swan cygnet (grey feet turning darker with age); right, Polish swan variant with pinkish hue to feet	Mute swan with lighter (pinkish) feet	Mute swan (darker hue feet)	Mute swans at Doncaster Lakeside (lighter pinkish hue feet)

In around 1800 some swans were brought in from Poland and were called Polish swans. At first, they were thought to be a new species, which was named cygnus immutabilis. Compared to normal mute swans, these swans are whiter, and their legs are pinkish, not dark. Later, modern science discovered the variant in the swans' DNA and confirmed that it was not a new species but a different allele.

=== Bats ===
After sunset the resident bats show themselves. Pipistrelle, Noctule, Daubentons, Brandts and Natterers have been heard on walks around Lakeside.

Pipistrelle in flight	Noctule bat at roost	Daubenton's bat	Natterer's bat	Brandt's bat

== Sports and recreation ==
A popular path for walkers, joggers and cyclists surrounds the lake. It follows the perimeter of the lake and is about 2 miles (3.5 kilometres) long.

Annual water sports events take place here, to the irritation of nature lovers and interest groups.

Annual dragon boat racing has also been promoted. Various groups have used the lakeside track as cycling tours for their events.

== Conservation ==
This area is monitored by the Lakeside Wildlife Action Group.

Other groups include Birdwatch, Swanwatch, Butterflywatch, Frogwatch, as well as walking and cycling groups.

The Lakeside Wildlife Action Group recently erected informative notice boards, sponsored by a local accounting firm. Other notice boards feature walking/cycle path, location map, scan codes and walking trials and these boards are managed by Doncaster Metropoliton Borough council.
