= Lakeside Country Club =

Lakeside Country Club may refer to:

- A country club that is part of the Lakeside Leisure Complex in Frimley Green
- A country club in Toluca Lake, Los Angeles

== See also ==
- Lakeside (disambiguation)
- Lakeside Golf Course (disambiguation)
