= William H. Nichols =

American chemist and businessman

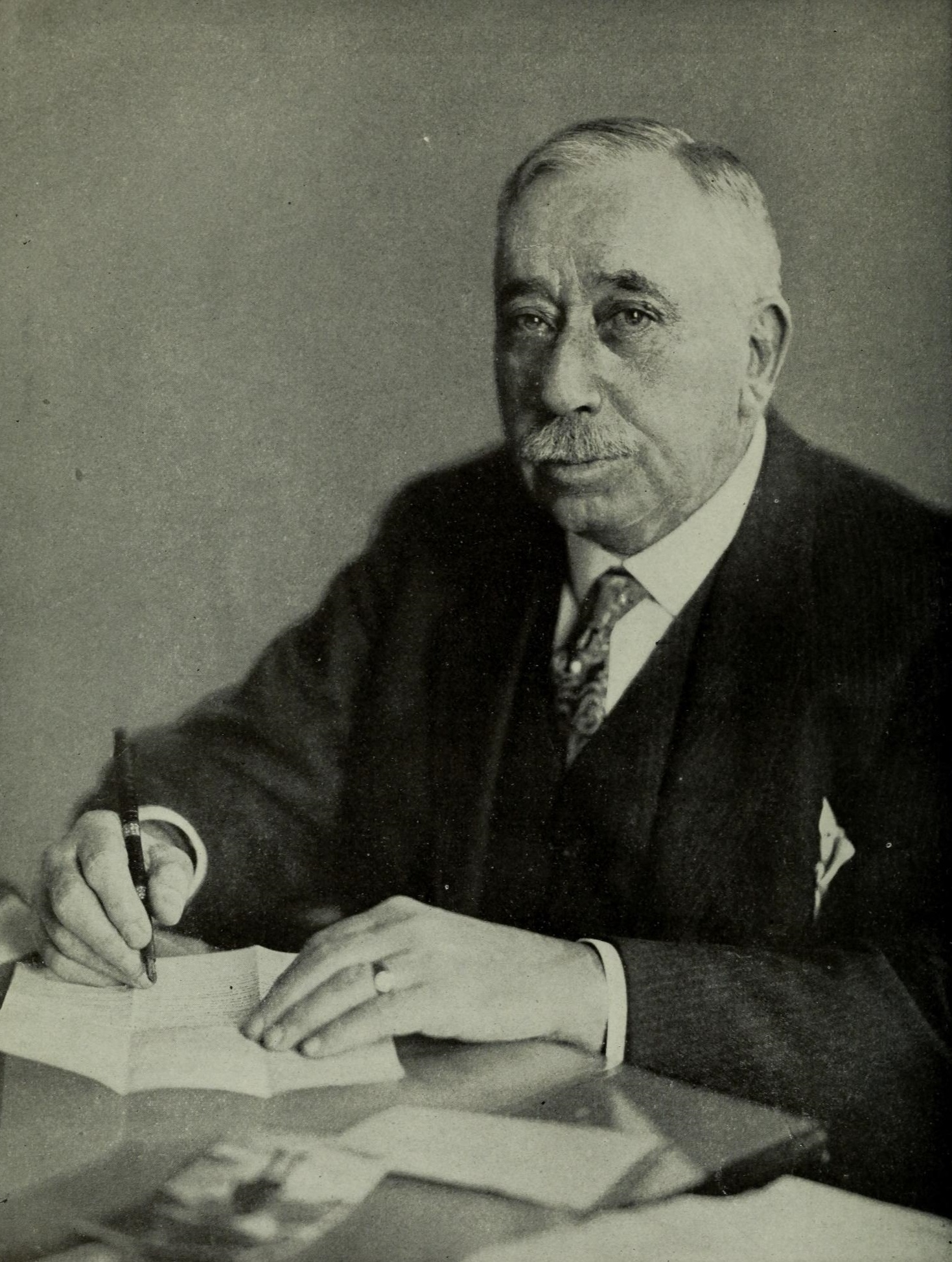
Portrait of William H. Nichols.

William Henry Nichols (January 9, 1852 – February 21, 1930) was an American chemist and businessman. He was instrumental in building the chemical supply business in the U.S. The specialty materials business of Honeywell traces its roots back to a small sulfuric acid company he started in 1870. Nichols was one of the original founders of the American Chemical Society, serving as president in 1918 and 1919. The New York branch of the society gives a prestigious award every year that is named after him, the William H. Nichols Medal Award. He attended New York University.

== Family ==
William Henry Nichols was born in Brooklyn on January 9, 1852. He was the son of George Henry and Sarah Elizabeth (Harris) Nichols. William H. Nichols attended the Brooklyn Polytechnic Institute from 1865 to 1868. He received his B.S. and M.S. degrees from the New York University in 1870 and 1873 respectively. Nichols also received honorary degrees from Columbia University (Sc.D., 1904), Lafayette College (LL.D., 1904), the University of Pittsburgh (Sc.D., 1920), the New York University (LL.D., 1920), and Tufts University (Sc.D., 1921). He married Hannah W. Bensel of Brooklyn on February 14, 1873. The couple had three children: William Henry Jr., born in 1874, Charles Walter, born in 1875, and Madeleine, born in 1884.

== Chemical business ==
Nichols, along with his son C. Walter Nichols, helped organize the merger of 12 companies in 1899 to create the General Chemical Company. Under his leadership, the company grew its asset base and increased its earnings threefold, making Nichols a force in America’s fledgling chemical industry. During World War I, he served as chairman of the Chemicals Committee of the Council of National Defense.

His vision of a bigger, better chemical company took off when he teamed up with investor Eugene Meyer in 1920. Nichols and Meyer combined five smaller chemical companies to create the Allied Chemical & Dye Corporation, which later became Allied Chemical Corp., and eventually became part of AlliedSignal, the forerunner of Honeywell’s specialty materials business. Both men have buildings named after them at Honeywell’s headquarters in Morristown, New Jersey. His original plant along the Newtown Creek in Queens is infamous for its legacy of pollution. Nichols is rumored to have once emptied vats of excess sulfuric acid into the creek rather than sell it cheaply to a businessman he had no respect for.

He became a commander of the Order of the Crown of Italy in 1912 and a knight of the Order of Saints Maurice and Lazarus in 1920.

== Later life ==
Nichols lived in Manhattan. He died on February 21, 1930, in Honolulu. Nichols was interred at the Green-Wood Cemetery in Brooklyn on March 9, 1930.

== Nichols' legacy ==
The success of Nichols' companies can be traced to several notable principles that guided his career. First was his deep belief in research and development. Second was his support for science education and the students of chemistry. Third was his concern for the welfare of his employees. Most important was his often quoted belief that "the Golden Rule is as applicable in business as it is in church."

It is this legacy of Nichols that is honored with an award named after him. The William H. Nichols Medal Award is given each year by the New York Section of the American Chemical Society. Nichols himself first established an award in 1902, making it the first gold medal for original chemical research. In June of that year, he gave 10 shares of preferred stock in General Chemical to the American Chemical Society to endow the first award. In accepting the stock, the board of directors requested permission of Nichols to name the award "The Nichols Medal of the New York Section." Since the first award on January 9, 1903, the American Chemical Society's New York Section has named 97 Nichols Medalists. Sixteen have subsequently been awarded the Nobel Prize for chemistry.

Initially, the medal award consisted of just the 18 carat gold Nichols Medal, whose design depicts the allegorical figure of Dr. Faust in his laboratory as described by Goethe. A bronze replica of the medal, to be used for display purposes, was later added to the award. There is also a cash award.
