= Owasco, New York =

- Town
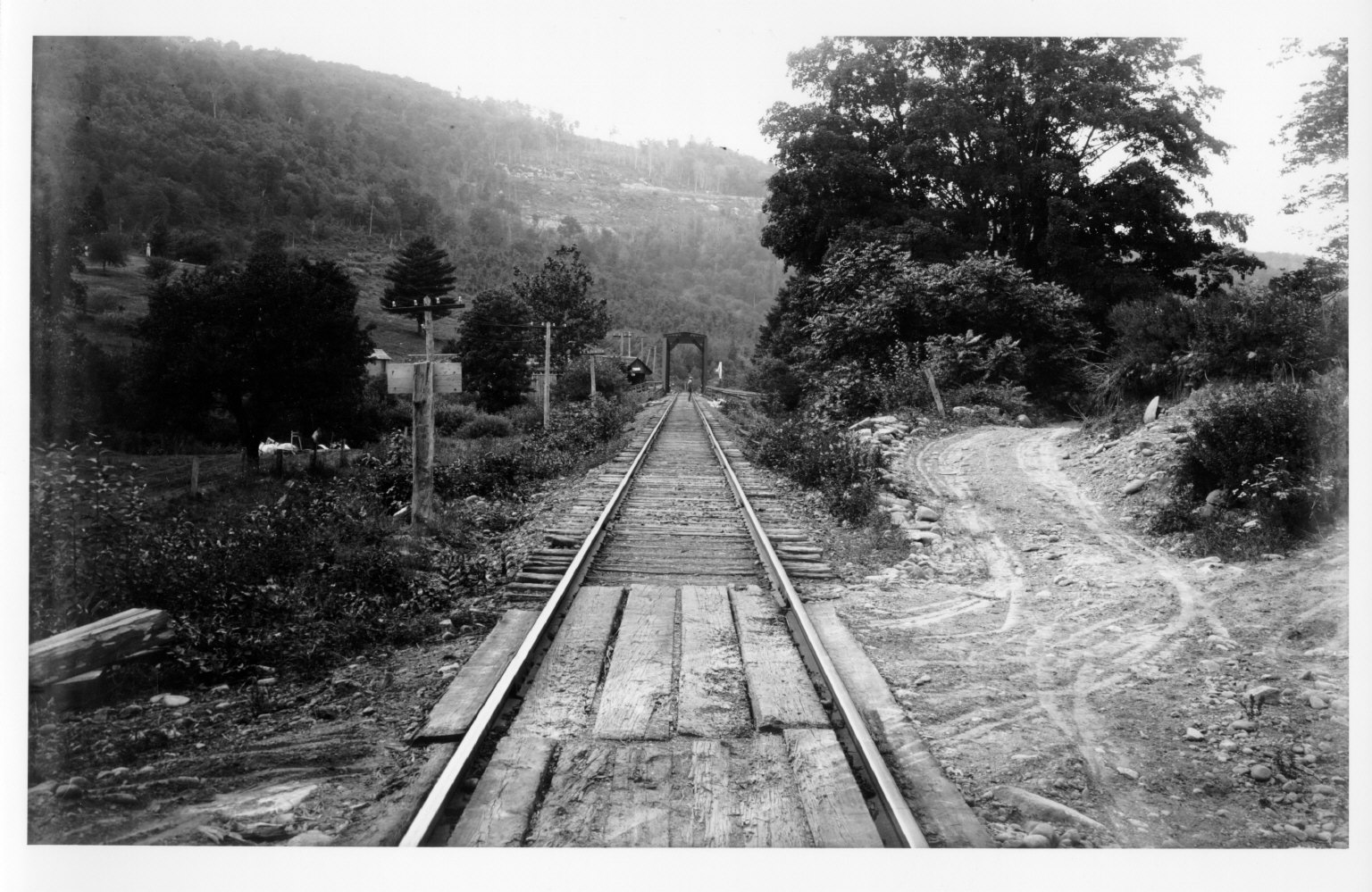
- Rail track and bridge near Owasco, 1870

- Location within Cayuga County and New York

- Location within New York Location within the United States
- Coordinates: 42°53′23″N 76°30′12″W
- Country: United States
- State: New York
- County: Cayuga

Government
  - Type: Town Council
  - Town Supervisor: Ed Wagner (R)
  - Town Council Jeremy VeVone (R) Anthony Gucciardi (R) Michale Vitale (R) Fred Corneilus (R): Members' List: • Edward J. Wagner, Jr. (R); • Anthony R. Gucciardi (R)

Area
  - Total: 23.48 sq mi (60.80 km^{2})
  - Land: 20.88 sq mi (54.08 km^{2})
  - Water: 2.59 sq mi (6.72 km^{2})
- Elevation: 896 ft (273 m)

Population (2010)
  - Total: 3,793
  - Estimate (2016): 3,678
  - Density: 176.1/sq mi (68.01/km^{2})
- Time zone: UTC-5 (Eastern (EST))
  - Summer (DST): UTC-4 (EDT)
- ZIP Code: 13021
- Area code: 315
- FIPS code: 36-011-55871
- GNIS feature ID: 0979333
- Website: www.owascony.gov

Owasco is a town in Cayuga County, New York, United States. It is part of the traditional territory of the Cayuga nation. The population was 3,793 at the 2010 census. Owasco is in the eastern part of Cayuga County and is at the southeast city line of Auburn. The town borders Owasco Lake, from where it gets its name.

== History ==
In early times, Owasco was home to the Cayuga, who lived primarily between Owasco and Cayuga lakes, which lay between the territory of the Onondaga and Seneca. Jesuits founded missions among the Cayuga in the mid-17th century. In 1660, there were approximately 1,500 Cayuga.

The land was first settled by Europeans around 1792, by a man named Herman Mesgow.

After the American Revolution, most Cayuga relocated to Canada after the Treaty of Canandaigua in 1794, although some bands were allowed small reservations in New York. New York made separate purchases and leases of land from the Indians, which were not ratified by the US Congress.

The town of Owasco was formed in 1802 from the town of Aurelius.

Lakeside Park was listed on the National Register of Historic Places in 1989.

== Notable people ==
- Ennis Raymond Austin, architect
- Enos Throop, tenth governor of New York

== Geography ==
According to the United States Census Bureau, the town has a total area of 23.5 square miles (60.8 km^{2}), of which 20.9 square miles (54.1 km^{2}) is land and 2.6 square miles (6.7 km^{2}), or 11.05%, is water.

Owasco Lake, one of the Finger Lakes, defines the western town line. The eastern town line is the border of Onondaga County. Sucker Brook enters Owasco Lake at the northern end, and Owasco Outlet marks the town line, south of Auburn. Dutch Hollow Brook enters Owasco Lake near Burtis Point.

New York State Route 38A is a north-south highway in the town, running southward along Owasco Lake.

== Demographics ==
Historical population
| Census | Pop. | Note | %± |
|---|---|---|---|
| 1820 | 1,290 | | — |
| 1830 | 1,350 | | 4.7% |
| 1840 | 1,319 | | −2.3% |
| 1850 | 1,254 | | −4.9% |
| 1860 | 1,351 | | 7.7% |
| 1870 | 1,261 | | −6.7% |
| 1880 | 1,297 | | 2.9% |
| 1890 | 1,162 | | −10.4% |
| 1900 | 1,331 | | 14.5% |
| 1910 | 1,393 | | 4.7% |
| 1920 | 1,458 | | 4.7% |
| 1930 | 1,754 | | 20.3% |
| 1940 | 2,100 | | 19.7% |
| 1950 | 2,543 | | 21.1% |
| 1960 | 3,409 | | 34.1% |
| 1970 | 3,619 | | 6.2% |
| 1980 | 3,612 | | −0.2% |
| 1990 | 3,490 | | −3.4% |
| 2000 | 3,760 | | 7.7% |
| 2010 | 3,793 | | 0.9% |
| 2016 (est.) | 3,678 | | −3.0% |
U.S. Decennial Census

As of the census of 2000, there were 3,755 people, 1,425 households, and 1,107 families residing in the town. The population density was 179.4 inhabitants per square mile (69.3/km^{2}). There were 1,608 housing units at an average density of 76.8 per square mile (29.7/km^{2}). The racial makeup of the town was 98.91% White, 0.11% African American, 0.03% Native American, 0.53% Asian, 0.08% from other races, and 0.35% from two or more races. Hispanic or Latino of any race were 0.32% of the population.

There were 1,425 households, out of which 34.7% had children under the age of 18 living with them, 68.7% were married couples living together, 6.3% had a female householder with no husband present, and 22.3% were non-families. 19.2% of all households were made up of individuals, and 10.7% had someone living alone who was 65 years of age or older. The average household size was 2.63 and the average family size was 3.01.

In the town, the population was spread out, with 25.7% under the age of 18, 5.1% from 18 to 24, 26.2% from 25 to 44, 26.8% from 45 to 64, and 16.2% who were 65 years of age or older. The median age was 41 years. For every 100 females, there were 96.6 males. For every 100 females age 18 and over, there were 92.2 males.

The median income for a household in the town was $52,544, and the median income for a family was $60,978. Males had a median income of $40,943 versus $27,500 for females. The per capita income for the town was $23,922. About 2.1% of families and 4.5% of the population were below the poverty line, including 4.6% of those under age 18 and 3.6% of those age 65 or over.

== Communities and locations in Owasco ==
- Baptist Corners – A hamlet in the northeastern part of the town.
- Burtis Point – A projection into Owasco Lake.
- Degroff – A hamlet in the northwestern part of the town.
- Highland Beach – A hamlet on the shore of Lake Owasco and NY-38A.
- Koenigs Point – A location on Owasco Lake at the southwestern corner of the town.
- Melrose Park – A suburban area south of Auburn on NY-38A.
- Owasco – The hamlet of Owasco is in the southeastern part of the town on NY-38A. The Owasco Reformed Church was listed on the National Register of Historic Places in 2010.
- Petty Corner – A hamlet in the northern part of Owasco, near Auburn.
- Valentines Corners – A hamlet west of Owasco village.
