= Lakeside Union School District =

Lakeside Union School District may refer to:

- Lakeside Union School District (Bakersfield) in Bakersfield, California
- Lakeside Union Elementary School District (Kings County) in Hanford, California
- Lakeside Union School District (Lakeside) in Lakeside, California
