= Crescent (brand) =

American supplier of hand tools

- Product type: Hand tools
- Current owner: Apex Tool Group
- Country: USA
- Introduced: 1907
- Previous owners: Crescent Niagara Corporation; Crescent Tool Company; Cooper Tools
- Website: www.crescenttool.com

Crescent is a brand of hand tools. It originated with the Crescent Tool Company, founded in 1907. The Crescent brand has changed ownership multiple times. It is currently owned by Apex Tool Group, LLC of Sparks, Maryland as part of its Hand Tools division. It is best known for its style of adjustable wrench.

== History ==
The Crescent Tool Company was founded in Jamestown, New York, by Karl Peterson and Edward J. Worcester in 1907. It is considered "one of the crown jewels of Jamestown's industry". The company soon became known for its adjustable wrenches.

On his famous 1927 solo flight across the Atlantic, Charles Lindbergh said that he took only "gasoline, sandwiches, a bottle of water, and a Crescent wrench and pliers". There was a rumor that Richard Evelyn Byrd, on his initial journey to Alaska, had a Crescent wrench in his provisions.

The Crescent Tool Company was acquired by a group of investors from Schoellkopf, Hutton & Pomeroy in 1960 after Marvin Peterson, Karl's son, sold it. The combined company was renamed the Crescent Niagara Corporation. In 1968, Crescent Niagara was acquired by Cooper Industries. In 2010, the tool divisions of Cooper Industries and Danaher Corporation formed a joint venture, Apex Tool Group, LLC. The brand is currently owned by Apex Brands, Inc. the intellectual property entity of Apex Tool Group.

Crescent brand adjustable wrenches are manufactured in both Sumter, South Carolina and in China.

== Gallery ==
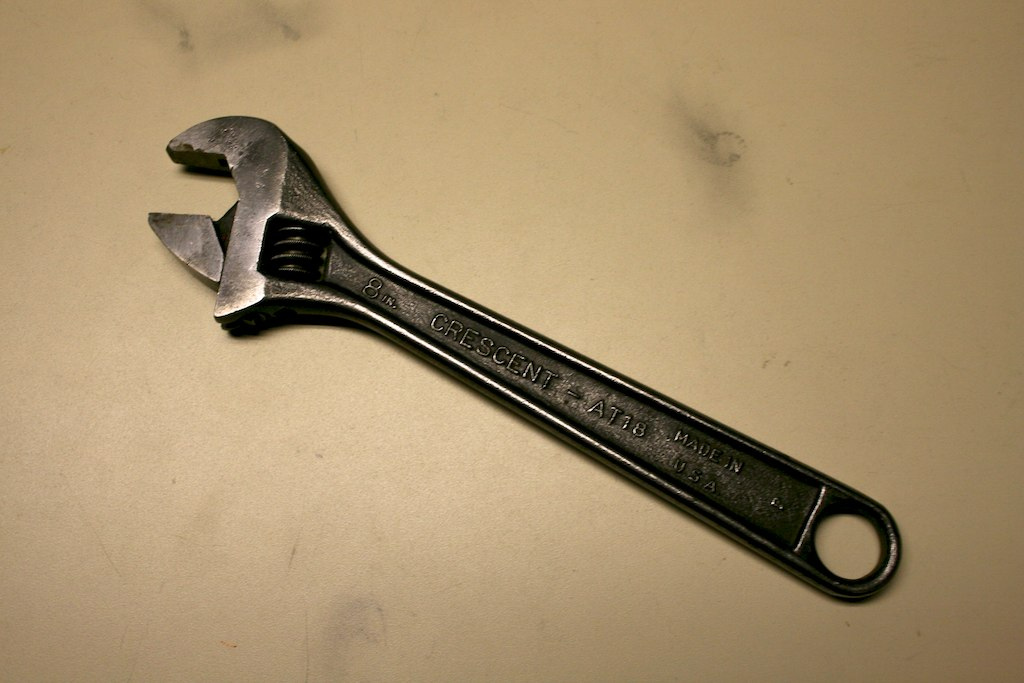
A Crescent adjustable wrench.
