= Lakeside Inn =

Lakeside Inn may refer to:

- Lakeside Inn (Mount Dora, Florida), a historic site in Mount Dora, Florida
- Lakeside Inn (Stateline), a hotel and casino in Stateline, Nevada
- Lakeside Inn (Lakeside, Michigan), a historic hotel in Lakeside, Michigan
