= Schoellkopf, Hutton & Pomeroy =

Schoellkopf, Hutton & Pomeroy was an American investment bank. After the sale of its security business to Dominick & Dominick in 1960, it became a manufacturing company, was renamed the Crescent Niagara Corporation, and was sold to Cooper Industries in 1968.

== History ==
In 1919, Schoellkopf, Hutton & Company, Inc. was formed in Buffalo, New York by Jacob F. Schoellkopf Jr. and Russell J. H. Hutton, a former vice president of Marine Trust. In 1921, Horace B. Pomeroy joined the firm and it was renamed Schoellkopf, Hutton & Pomeroy. Originally all the shares of Schoellkopf, Hutton & Pomeroy were owned by Seeheim Corporation, which was in turn owned by Jacob F. Schoellkopf Jr. and his two sisters. Later, ownership expanded.

Following an increase in regulatory requirements, in October 1935 control of the investment bank was transferred from the Niagara Share Corporation of Maryland, (Note: Niagara Share Corporation was organized on May 6, 1925 under the laws of Delaware as a holding company for the Schoellkopf family utility interests. In 1929, Niagara Share Corporation of Maryland was organized further to consolidate the Schoellkopf family interest, and succeeded substantially to the holdings of the original Niagara Share Corporation.) to the holders of the Class B common stock. As part of the transfer, the capital stock of the company increased to $3,260,200, consisting of 32,300 shares of participating 5.5 percent cumulative non-voting preferred stock of $100 par value and 302,000 shares of common stock of 10 cents par value with full voting rights. The Niagara Share Company owned all of the preferred stock and acquired, for cash, $301,400 shares of the new common stock which was immediately distributed, as a dividend, to the holders of Niagara Share Class B common stock on the basis of one share of the new common stock for each five shares of Niagara Share's Class B common stock. The new firm reported $113,376 of income in the final quarter of 1935, the first statement issued since the company's recapitalization and divorce from Niagara Share.

By the close of 1936, the firm had assets of $6,544,798, however, by the close of 1937, the total assets had decreased to $3,905,807 largely due to a decrease in "general market securities" from $3,292,133 to $2,194,632 in 1937. Likewise, net profits fell from $1,308,799 to $117,488. This report followed "sharp words" exchanged when a lawyer for the Securities and Exchange Commission questioned a $9,700,000 "good-will" entry in the accounting records of the firm related to a loss while the firm was a subsidiary of Niagara Share.

In 1942, following the death of Jacob F. Schoellkopf Jr., Walter J. Munro was elected president of the firm. Munro had been a vice president of the company since 1935. In 1950, Jacob F. Schoellkopf III, president of the Niagara Share Corporation, was named chairman of the firm, George J. Coggeshall, formerly a vice president, was elected executive vice president and J. Fred Schoellkopf IV was elected a vice president.

=== 1960 merger ===
In 1960, Jacob F. Schoellkopf IV, president of Schoellkopf, Hutton & Pomeroy, announced along with A. Varick Stout and Seymour H. Knox III, partners in Dominick & Dominick, that the two investment security firms were to merge whereby the investment banking activities of Schoellkopf, Hutton & Pomeroy were acquired by the Dominick firm and the Schoellkopf name remained in the other aspects of the business. The Schoellkopf family and the Knox family had previously worked together on the Transcontinental Television Corporation (owner and operator of WGR-TV, AM and FM in Buffalo and other broadcasting outlets) and the Niagara Share Corporation, a Buffalo investment company with $60,000,000 of assets.

In 1961, cousins Jacob F. Schoellkopf IV and Paul A. Schoellkopf Jr. transformed the remainder of the Schoellkopf, Hutton & Pomeroy firm into a manufacturing company "selling an item as basic as hand tools." They changed the name to Crescent Niagara Corporation and acquired the Crescent Tool Company of Jamestown, New York. Crescent Niagara Corporation was later acquired by Cooper Industries in 1968.

== See also ==
- Dominick & Dickerman
