= AlliedSignal =

Defunct American aerospace, automotive and engineering company

AlliedSignal, Inc.
- Type: Public
- Traded as: NYSE: ALD DJIA component (until 1999) S&P 500 component (until 1999)
- Predecessor: Allied Corp.
- Founded: 1985; 41 years ago
- Defunct: December 1, 1999
- Fate: Acquisition of and merger with Honeywell Inc.
- Successor: Honeywell
- Headquarters: Morristown, New Jersey
- Revenue: US$ 15.1 billion (1999)
- Net income: US$ 1.3 billion (1999)
- Number of employees: 70,400 (1999)

AlliedSignal was an American aerospace, automotive and engineering company, created through the 1985 merger of Allied Corp. and The Signal Companies. It purchased Honeywell for $14.8 billion in 1999, and adopted the Honeywell name and identity.

== History ==
The Allied Chemical & Dye Corporation originated with the 1920 merger of five chemical companies: Barrett Paving Materials (est. 1852), General Chemical Company (est. 1899), National Aniline & Chemical Company (est. 1917), Semet-Solvay Company (est. 1895), and the Solvay Process Company (est. 1881). The consolidation occurred with the backing of chemist William Nichols, who became concerned about dependence on the German chemical industry during World War I, and financier Eugene Meyer. It acquired the Eltra Corporation in 1979.

The company renamed itself the Allied Chemical Corporation in 1958, then simply the Allied Corp. in 1981. Allied merged with the Bendix Corporation in 1983, beginning the company's involvement in aerospace.

The Signal Companies traced their history to the Signal Gasoline Company, founded by Samuel B. Mosher in 1922. It renamed itself to Signal Oil & Gas in 1928 to reflect its expanding businesses. By the 1950s, Signal was the largest independent oil company on the West Coast of the United States and Mosher held large stakes in American President Lines and the Flying Tiger Line. In 1964, Signal merged with the Garrett Corporation, an aerospace company. In 1967, they purchased Mack Truck for $85m US. The combined company adopted "The Signal Companies" as its corporate name in 1968, and in 1974, sold its original Oil operations to Burmah Oil for $480m.

The merger of Allied and Signal made aerospace the new company's largest business sector. The combined company adopted the name Allied-Signal on September 19, 1985. It dropped the hyphen to become AlliedSignal in 1993 to reinforce a one-company image and signify the full integration of all of its businesses. Between 1992 and 1997, the company radically reduced the number of suppliers from whom parts and materials were purchased, downsizing its supply base from 10,000 to 2000, particularly by eliminating poorer performing suppliers and training those who remained.

On June 7, 1999, AlliedSignal acquired Honeywell for $14.8 billion and adopted the latter's more recognizable name.

== Product range ==
Before the merger, Honeywell was an international controls company that developed and supplied advanced technology products, systems and services to aviation and space companies and industry. The product lines of the two companies were complementary, the only principal overlap being avionics.

- Aerospace
  - Aircraft lighting
  - Aircraft wheels & braking systems
  - Auxiliary power units (APUs)
  - Avionics
  - Engines for regional/business aircraft
  - Environmental control systems (ECS)
  - Flight recorders (Black boxes)
  - Jet engine fuel control systems
- Automotive products
  - Autolite - Spark plugs
  - Fram - Air filters, fuel filters, oil filters
  - Prestone - Antifreeze
  - Garrett - Turbochargers (formerly AiResearch)
- Engineered materials
  - Electronic products
  - Polymers
  - Specialised chemicals
- Federal Manufacturing and Technology
  - Operates facilities for the United States Department of Energy

As of 2006, Allied-Signal's automotive products included Fram Filters, Autolite Spark Plugs and Prestone Anti-Freeze. The Bendix Corporation purchased both the Fram and Autolite brands from other companies in 1973. The Prestone brand was acquired in the late 1990s.

== See also ==
- Garrett AiResearch

== Notes ==
1. Stock no longer trades. New symbol is HON.
