= Lakeside Golf Course =

Lakeside Golf Course may refer to:

== Canada ==
- Deerhurst Lakeside Golf Course, a golf course in Huntsville, Ontario
- Lakeside Golf Club, golf course in West Guilford, Ontario
- Lakeside Golf Resort, a golf course in Dundurn, Saskatchewan

== United States ==
- Lakeside Golf Club, in Blackhawk, California
- Lakeside Golf Club, in Toluca Lake, Los Angeles
- Lakeside Golf Course (Oklahoma), in Stillwater, Oklahoma

== See also ==
- Lakeside (disambiguation)
- Lakeside Country Club (disambiguation)
