= Lakeside Cemetery (Hamburg, New York) =

Coordinates: 42°45′20″N 78°52′17″W

Lakeside Cemetery is a cemetery located in Hamburg, New York. It is part of the Forest Lawn Group of Cemeteries and has been in operation for over 135 years.

== Historic figures in Lakeside Cemetery ==
- Home Run Johnson (1872–1963), Negro league baseball infielder and batting champion
- John Raymond Pillion (1904–1978), US Congressman
- Jacob F. Schoellkopf Jr. (1858–1942), business executive, founder of Schoellkopf Aniline and Chemical Works

== Lakeside Cemetery Administration Office ==
Built in approximately 1875, the office was constructed as a trolley and train station for what was then called the Buffalo Rural Cemetery. The primary function of the station – which contains a mourning room in its tower – was to receive bodies shipped by train from Buffalo for the cemetery, along with families of the decedents.

Constructed of local fieldstone, the station is built in a vaguely Richardson Romanesque style, with arched doors and windows, and stone pillars that support bracketed eaves. There are also two stone fireplaces inside, constructed of yellow Roman brick with egg and dart terra cotta molding.
