= Lakeside Park =

Lakeside Park may refer to:

In Australia

- Lakeside Park, formerly Lakeside International Raceway, an Australian motor racing facility

In England

- Lakeside Park, Guildford, a Local Nature Reserve in England

In United States

- Lakeside Park, Kentucky, a small city in the United States
- Lakeside Park, New Jersey, an unincorporated community in the United States

Other uses

- "Lakeside Park" (song) by Rush about Lakeside Park in St Catharines, Ontario, Canada
- Lakeside Park Carousel
