= Owasco Reformed Church =

Historic church in New York, United States

- U.S. National Register of Historic Places
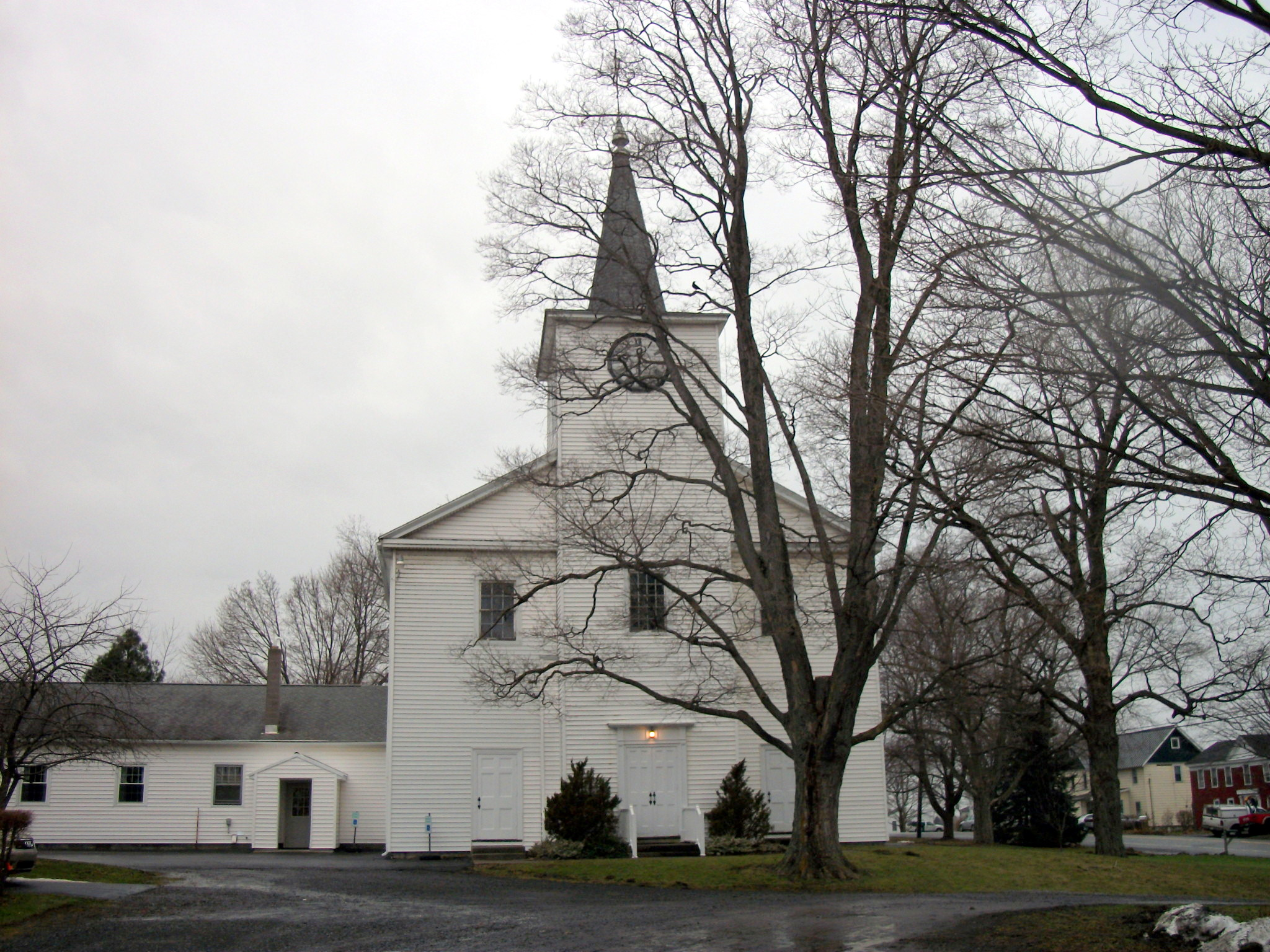
- Owasco Reformed Church, January 2011

- Location within New York Location within the United States
- Location: 5105 State Route 38A (E. Lake Rd.), Owasco, New York
- Coordinates: 42°51′16.97″N 76°27′54.86″W
- Area: 2 acres (0.81 ha)
- Built: 1811-1815
- Architect: Selover, Isaac; Hoyt, Elivar
- Architectural style: Federal, Queen Anne
- NRHP reference No.: 10000223
- Added to NRHP: April 27, 2010

Owasco Reformed Church, also known as Reformed Dutch Church of Owasco, is a historic Dutch Reformed church located at Owasco in Cayuga County, New York. It was built in 1811-1815 and is a large, rectangular, Federal-era frame meeting house at the core of the hamlet of Owasco. Also located on the property is a two-story, Queen Anne style parsonage built in 1886-1888 and a gable roofed frame barn.

It was listed on the National Register of Historic Places in 2010.
