= Jacob F. Schoellkopf Jr. =

American dye business magnate (1858–1942)

Jacob Friedrich Schoellkopf Jr.
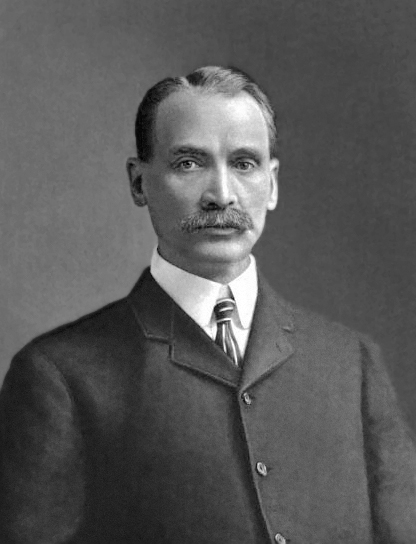
- Jacob F. Schoellkopf Jr. in 1908
- Born: February 27, 1858; Buffalo, New York, US
- Died: September 9, 1942 (aged 84); Buffalo, New York, US
- Resting place: Forest Lawn Cemetery
- Education: Ludwig-Maximilians-Universität München; University of Stuttgart
- Occupation: Business magnate
- Spouse: Wilma Spring
- Children: 3
- Parent(s): Jacob F. Schoellkopf; Christiana T. Duerr

Jacob Friedrich Schoellkopf Jr. (February 27, 1858 – September 9, 1942) was an American business executive, founder of Schoellkopf Aniline and Chemical Works, and member of the Schoellkopf family who were involved in hydroelectric resources at Niagara Falls.

== Early life ==
Jacob F. Schoellkopf Jr. was born in Buffalo, New York, on February 27, 1858, the fourth son of industrialist Jacob F. Schoellkopf (1819–1899) and Christiana T. (née Duerr) Schoellkopf (1827–1903). He started his education at local schools in Buffalo, then St. Joseph's Collegiate Institute in Buffalo, afterward going to Germany where he studied for from 1873 to 1880 at the Ludwig-Maximilians-Universität München and the University of Stuttgart, specializing in chemistry where he graduated from the Stuttgart-Polytechnic College as a member of the class of 1880.

== Career ==
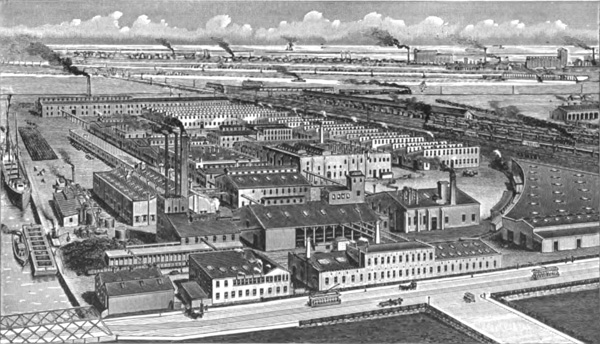
Schoellkopf, Hartford & Hanna Co. works in Buffalo, New York, formerly the Schoellkopf Aniline and Chemical Works, ca. 1908.

After Schoellkopf graduated, he returned to Buffalo from Germany. His studies at the university had involved the subject of coal tar dyes, and he felt that the American market offered a great field for these products. Therefore, he established the "Schoellkopf Aniline and Chemical Works", which was founded shortly after his return to Buffalo and which constituted the largest plant of its kind in the United States. The business later became the "Schoellkopf, Hartford & Hanna Company", of which Schoellkopf was president. As of 1908, the company had $3,000,000 (equivalent to $107,500,000 in 2025) capital, employed 350 men and was paying $15,000 (equivalent to $537,000 in 2025) a month in wages. The plant covered about thirty-six acres of land and consisted of thirty brick buildings.

National Aniline and Chemical Company was formed in 1917 by the merger of Schoellkopf Aniline and Chemical, Beckers Aniline and Chemical of Brooklyn, and the Benzol Products Company. Included also were certain facilities of Semet-Solvay, the Barrett Company, and the General Chemical company that made coal tar intermediates. The executives were Schoellkopf, C. P. Hugo Schoellkopf, I. F. Stone, and Dr. William G. Beckers. He was a member of the chemical division of the War Industries Board up until October 1918.

Additionally, Schoellkopf was president of the "American Magnesia and Covering Company", located at Plymouth Meeting near Philadelphia; vice-president of the "Commonwealth Trust Company" and of the "Central National Bank"; and a director of the Columbia National Bank and of the "Security, Safe Deposit Company". He was also a director of the Niagara Falls Hydraulic Power and Manufacturing Company; a director of the National Aniline and Chemical Company of New York; also of the "Cliff Paper Company" of Niagara Falls and the "International Hotel Company", also of Niagara Falls. He was president of the "Contact Process Company" and an investor in the "New York State Steel Company" (which later became Republic Steel).

Schoellkopf was president of the "Schoellkopf, Hutton & Pomeroy Investment Bank", a private entity, which later evolved into the "Niagara Share Corp.," a closed-end investment fund. (Note: In 1960, Schoellkopf, Hutton & Pomeroy merged with Dominick & Dominick, the investment and merchant banking firm located in New York City.) In 1926, Schoellkopf and his son, Jacob F. Schoellkopf III, engaged Esenwein & Johnson to build the "Niagara Share Building" to house the investment bank. The bank was on the third floor of the building and featured a telegraph room and trading floor which was a mini-version of the New York Stock Exchange.

== Personal life ==
On March 31, 1882, Schoellkopf was married to Wilma Spring (c. 1861–1938), daughter of Alexander Spring, of Stuttgart, Germany. They resided in Buffalo, New York and together they had:

- Jacob F. Schoellkopf III (1883–1952), who married Olive Abbott (1886–1958), daughter of George Lansing Abbott and Nellie M. Houghton.
- Ruth Wilma Schoellkopf (1899–1961), who married archaeologist Philip Phillips (1900–1994) in 1922.
- Esther Spring Schoellkopf (b. 1901), who married Ernest Kramer (d. 1955) of Berne, Switzerland on February 13, 1928 in Honolulu, Hawaii.

Schoellkopf was a member of the Buffalo Historical Society, of the National Geographical Society of Washington, D.C., and of the American Society for Political and Social Science. He was also a member of the Buffalo Club and the Country Club of Buffalo. He was a trustee of Buffalo General Hospital and the inaugural chair, from 1919 to 1922, of the Community Foundation Board (now the "Community Foundation for Greater Buffalo").

Schoellkopf died on September 9, 1942. He was buried alongside his wife Wilma, who died in 1938, Lakeside Memorial Park Cemetery in Hamburg, New York. At his death, Schoellkopf left $50,000 (equivalent to $985,000 in 2025) to the Buffalo Council of the Boy Scouts of America and an additional $50,000 (equivalent to $985,000 in 2025) among six public, welfare and educational organizations. Additionally, he made bequests to several of his employees, including $10,000 (equivalent to $197,000 in 2025) to his housekeeper, Rose Boger. The majority of his estate was left to his three children.
