= Lakeside Village, Doncaster =

Shopping centre in South Yorkshire, England

Lakeside Village

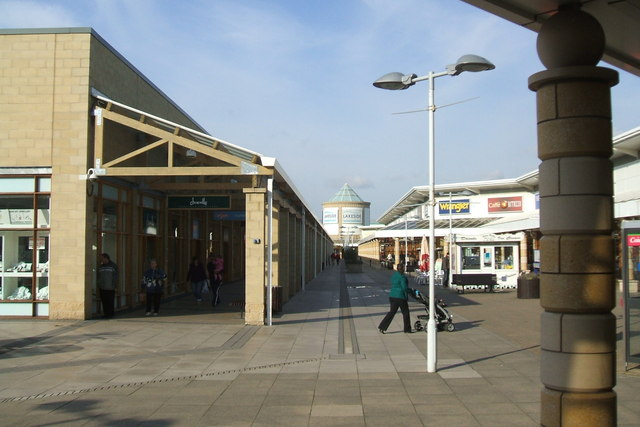
- Lakeside Village shopping precinct
- Location: Doncaster, South Yorkshire, England
- Coordinates: 53.5077°N 1.1139°W
- Opened: 1990; 36 years ago
- Owner: Kent County Council
- Architect: Skidmore, Owings & Merrill
- Num. of stores: 45
- Floors: 1
- Parking: 900 spaces
- Public transit: Doncaster (in Doncaster city centre)
- Website: https://www.lakeside-village.co.uk/

Lakeside Village is an outlet shopping centre in Lakeside, a suburb of Doncaster, South Yorkshire, England. Remodelled in 2003, it was previously known as The Yorkshire Outlet.

Lakeside Village is owned by Kent County Council, despite being in South Yorkshire, and operated by the retail property asset management company Realm, which also work together on a number of other outlet centres in the United Kingdom.

== Stores ==
=== Flagship ===
- Clarks
- Marks & Spencer
- Next

=== Smaller stores ===
- Cadbury
- Lillywhites
- Pavers

== Transport ==
=== Bus ===
Bus services 56 from stand A4 direct from the Frenchgate Interchange. Bus service 55 goes from the outlet direct to the Frenchgate Interchange. Journey time averages around 10 minutes each way.

=== Rail ===
Doncaster station is a major UK railway station and is served by Northern, London North Eastern Railway, TransPennine Express, East Midlands Railway and Hull Trains. Doncaster is 1 hour 35 minutes from London Kings Cross or 20 minutes from Sheffield station (using direct services). The station is adjacent to Doncaster Frenchgate Interchange, from which all bus services depart.
