= Lakeside Elementary School =

There are multiple Lakeside Elementary Schools:

- Lakeside Elementary School (Los Gatos, California) in Los Gatos, California.
- Lakeside Elementary School (Pembroke Pines, Florida) of Broward County Public Schools in Pembroke Pines, Florida.
- Lakeside Elementary School (Coppell, Texas) in Coppel, Texas.
- Lakeside Elementary School of Henrico County Public Schools in Henrico County, Virginia.
