= Allied Corporation =

American Aerospace Company

- Final logo, used from 1981
- Formerly: Allied Chemical & Dye Corp (1920–1958); Allied Chemical Corp (1958–1981)
- Type: Public
- Industry: Chemicals
- Predecessor: General Chemical Co.; The Solvay Process Co.; Semet-Solvay Co.; The Barrett Co.; National Aniline & Chemical Co.
- Founded: 1920; 106 years ago
- Founder: Eugene Meyer, William Henry Nichols
- Defunct: 1985
- Fate: Merger with The Signal Companies
- Successor: AlliedSignal, Honeywell
- Headquarters: Morristown, New Jersey
- Area served: Worldwide
- Products: Chemicals, plastics, catalysts, Hydrocarbon exploration and production

Allied Corporation was a major American company with operations in the chemical, aerospace, automotive, oil and gas industries. It was initially formed in 1920 as the Allied Chemical and Dye Corporation as an amalgamation of five chemical companies. In 1958, it was renamed Allied Chemical Corporation when it diversified into oil and gas exploration. Allied Chemical then became Allied Corporation in 1981. In 1985, Allied merged with the Signal Companies to become AlliedSignal. AlliedSignal would eventually acquire Honeywell in 1999 and then adopt its name.

Allied Chemical was included in the Dow Jones Industrial Average since 1925.

== Predecessors ==
=== General Chemical Company ===
The General Chemical Corporation commenced business on March 1, 1899. The preferred stock of the new company was issued for tangible assets, appraised carefully over a period of nine months. The common stock with some exceptions was issued for good-will and intangible assets and was set equal to ten years worth of earnings of each predecessor company, interpolated from 5.5 years of earnings reports. The appraisal was $14,008,955 of aggregate capital and the total capital invested in the United States in chemical works was estimated to have been $238,000,000 in 1899.

Companies taken over in 1899
Name	Hometown
Campbell Chemical Co	Chicago, Illinois
W. H. Chappell & Co	St. Louis, Missouri
Dundee Chemical Works	Dundee, New Jersey
Fairfield Chemical Works	Bridgeport, Connecticut
Highlands Chemical Co	Highlands Station, New York
James Irwin & Co	Pittsburgh, Pennsylvania
Lodi Chemical Co	Lodi, New Jersey
Martin Kalbfleisch Chemical Co	Bayonne, New Jersey
Martin Kalbfleisch Chemical Co	Buffalo, New York
James L. Morgan & Co	Shadyside, New Jersey
James L. Morgan & Co	Bridgeport, Connecticut
National Chemical Co	Cleveland, Ohio
The Nichols Chemical Co	Laurel Hill, Long Island, New York
The Nichols Chemical Co	Troy, New York
The Nichols Chemical Co	Syracuse, New York
Passaic Chemical Co	Newark, New Jersey
Moro Phillips Chemical Co	Philadelphia, Pennsylvania
Nichols Chemical Co of Canada Ltd

General Chemical Co plants (1902)
Name	State	Location	bold=exact
Bayonne Works	NJ	Constable Hook	40.6545°N 74.10076°W
Bridgeport Works	CT	Worden Ave. Bridgeport	41.16507°N 73.20577°W
Dundee Works	NJ	Lodi & 8th Passaic	40.8577°N 74.1111°W
Fairfield Works	CT	Fairfield	
Buffalo Works	NY	Abbott Rd. & Buffalo River Buffalo	
Chicago Works	IL	21st and Stewart Ave. Chicago	
Calumet Works	IL	Chicago	
Highlands Works	NY	Highland Station Putnam County	
Hudson River Works	NJ	Shadyside	
Laurel Hill Works	NY	Laurel Hill Long Island	
Lodi Works	NJ	Lodi	
National Works	OH	Cleveland	
Passaic Works	NJ	Brill Ave. Newark	40.73455°N 74.1444°W
St. Louis Works	MO	St. Louis	
Syracuse Works	NY	Marsh Rd. Syracuse	43.06778°N 76.16865°W
Troy Works	NY	Erie Canal Lock No. 4 Troy	42.74622°N 73.70753°W
United States Works	NJ	Camden	39.94692°N 75.10768°W
Moro Phillips Works	NJ	Camden	39.94692°N 75.10768°W
Standard Chemical Works	NJ	Camden	
Illinois Works	IL	Chicago Heights	

=== The Barrett Company ===
Incorporated as the American Coal Products Co. and before May 1, 1903 acquired 90% of the stock of United Coke & Gas Co. (a producer of byproduct coke ovens ) and 80% of Barrett Manufacturing Co. of West Virginia (a producer of various coal products). On January 1, 1909, sold its coke oven interests (which included the United Otto and Otto Hoffman coke oven patents) to the Oberschlesische Kokswerke & Chemische Fabriken AG of Berlin, which formed the German-American Coke & Gas Co. in which American Coal Products Co. had some interest. Renamed to (The) Barrett Co. on January 25, 1916.

Earnings
Year	Profit	Dividends
1907	$1,520,262	
1908	940,409	
1909	1,285,173	
1910	1,393,903	
1911	1,062,330	$740,463

== History ==
During World War I, Imperial Germany controlled much of the world's chemical production. This resulted in critical shortages of certain dyes, drugs and especially ammonia, a vital compound used to make fertilizers and explosives.

=== Allied Chemical and Dye Corporation ===
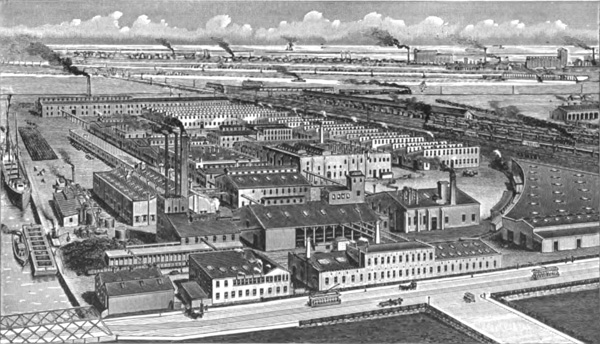
Schoellkopf, Hartford & Hanna Co. works in Buffalo, New York, formerly the Schoellkopf Aniline and Chemical Works, c. 1908

In 1920, publisher Eugene Meyer and noted chemist William Henry Nichols founded Allied Chemical and Dye Corporation in order to address this shortcoming in American industrial production. Allied was an amalgamation of five existing companies with a total capitalization of $175,000,000, including Barrett Chemical Company (est. 1858), The General Chemical Company (est. 1899), National Aniline & Chemical Company (est. 1917), Semet-Solvay Company (est. 1895), and the Solvay Process Company (est. 1881). All manufacturing was consolidated in Buffalo, and much attention was given to improving the processes hastily introduced during World War I. Allied's first venture into new markets was the construction of a synthetic ammonia plant near Hopewell, Virginia in 1928. This would soon become the world's largest producer of ammonia.

Pursuant to a plan adopted September 9, 1920, stockholders of the companies to be consolidated were invited to deposit their stock for exchange. By December 2, 1920, well above 90% were deposited, the exchange offer expired December 15 and on December 17, 1920 the new company was incorporated in the state of New York.

Distribution of shares
Company	Incorp	Deposited	Ratio	New Stock issued
Preferred Stock (par value)
General Chemical Co.		$15,438,000	$100	$15,438,000
The Barrett Co.		7,113,900	116.66	8,299,100
National Aniline & Chemical Co., Inc		13,588,800	100	13,588,800
Total				$37,326,400
Common Stock (shares)
General Chemical Co.	February 15, 1899 (NY)	194,566	2.66863	519,225
The Solvay Process Co.	September 28, 1881 (NY)	210,832	3.22415	679,755
Semet-Solvay Co.	(Note: The Semet-Solvay Co. of Pennsylvania was incorporated in 1895 with a capital of $75,000. In 1916 the $4,000,000 stock was exchanged 2-for-1 for $8,000,000 of the new company.)January 31, 1916 (NY)	102,977	2.73010	281,138
The Barrett Co.	February 7, 1903 (NJ)	153,502	2.34088	359,330
National Aniline & Chemical Co., Inc	May 26, 1917 (NY)	288,283	1.05454	304,007
Total				2,143,455

Stock certificates began trading on the New York Stock Exchange in September. Barrett (since 1916), National Aniline (since 1919) and General Chemical (since 1902) were listed on the NYSE at the time of merger, the two Solvay companies were not.

Allied Chemical Common Stock Price Range (Note: 1920)
	Year		Jan	Feb	Mar	Apr	May	Jun	Jul	Aug	Sep	Oct	Nov	Dec
1920	62 3/8	High									62 3/8	59 5/8	59 3/8	53 1/2
1920	43 1/4	Low									57 1/2	56	46	43 1/4

National Aniline and Chemical Works had been formed in 1917 by the merger of Schoellkopf Aniline and Chemical, Beckers Aniline and Chemical of Brooklyn, and the Benzol Products Company. Included also were certain facilities of Semet-Solvay, the Barrett Company, and the General Chemical company that made coal tar intermediates. The executives were Jacob F. Schoellkopf Jr., C. P. Hugo Schoellkopf, I. F. Stone, and Dr. William G. Beckers.

Henry Francis Atherton joined as Secretary of the National Aniline and Chemical Company in the 1920s and served as president of Allied Chemical and Dye Corporation from 1934 to 1946. He was also chairman of the board from 1935, until his death in 1949.

The company was renamed to Allied Chemical Corporation on April 28, 1958.

=== Allied Chemical Corporation ===
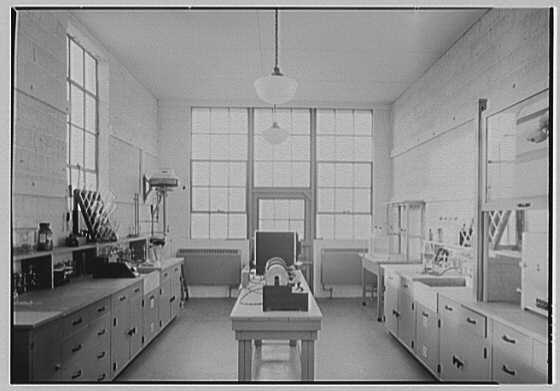
Morristown factory space

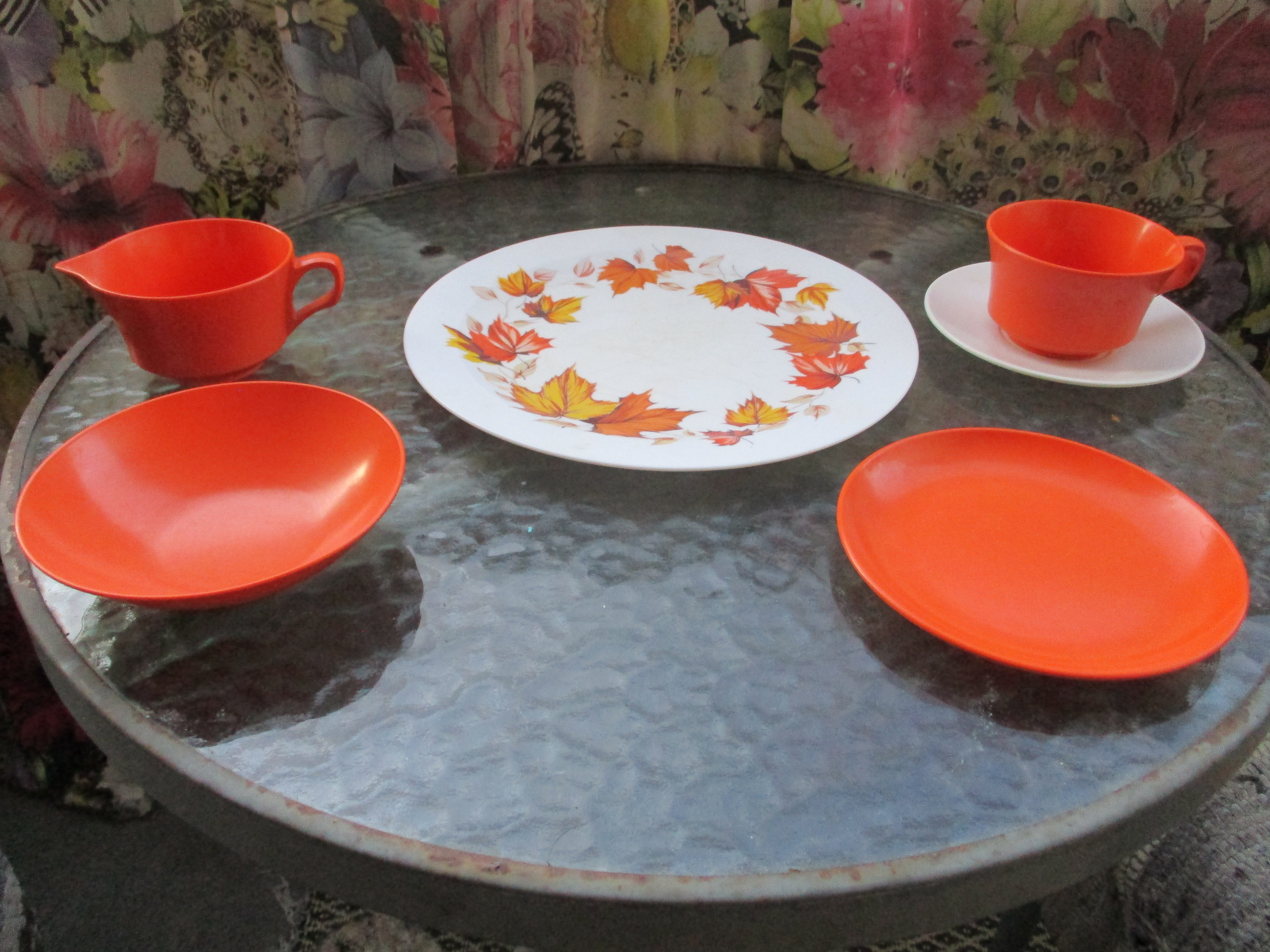
Allied Chemical flatware, creamer, coffee cup

After World War II, Allied began manufacturing other products, including Nylon 6, refrigerants and plastic dinnerware. The company name was simplified to reflect thithumbsAllied Chemical flatware, creamer, coffee cup diversification, becoming Allied Chemical Corporation in 1958. It also moved its headquarters to Morristown, New Jersey.

In 1962, Allied bought Union Texas Natural Gas. Allied initially regarded Union as a vertical integration supplier of raw materials for its chemical products. However, CEO John T. Connor, secretary of commerce under president Lyndon Johnson, sold many of Allied's unprofitable businesses in the 1970s and invested more heavily in oil and gas exploration. By 1979, Union Texas was generating 80% of Allied's revenue.

Between 1978 and 1979, Allied funded The MacNeil/Lehrer Report on public television.

=== Allied Corp. ===
As the company sought to further diversify its operations, it was renamed Allied Corporation in 1981.

Its next acquisition, in 1983, was Bendix Corporation, an aerospace and automotive firm. By 1984, Bendix was generating 50% of Allied's income, while oil and gas generated 38%.

Between 1964 and 1984, the reporting marks used to identify Allied Chemical's rolling stock on the North American railroad network was NLX.

At one point in 1985, Allied funded Nova on PBS.

=== AlliedSignal ===
In 1985, Allied merged with the Signal Companies to become AlliedSignal. The company would eventually acquire Honeywell in 1999, and adopt its name.

== See also ==
- British Dyestuffs Corporation
- IG Farben
- United Alkali Company

== Notes ==
Coke plants of United Coke & Gas Co. (Dec 1901)
Owner	Town	Built	Ovens	Coke for	Gas for
Cambria Steel Co	Johnstown	1895-1898	160	Blast furnace	Fuel
Pitts. Gas & Coke Co	Glassport	1896	120	Blast furnace, domestic	Fuel
New England Gas & Coke Co	Everett	1898	400	Domestic, Locomotive	Illum.
Dominion Iron & Steel Co	Sydney	1900	400	Blast Furnace	Fuel
Hamilton Otto Coke Co	Hamilton	1900	50	Foundry, Domestic	Illum.
Lackawanna Iron & Steel Co	Lebanon	1901	232	Blast furnace	Fuel
Lackawanna Iron & Steel Co	Buffalo	1901	564	Blast Furnace	Fuel
South Jersey Gas & Electric Traction Co	Camden	1901	100	Foundry, domestic	Illum.
Maryland Steel Co	Sparrows Point	1901	200	Blast furnace	Illum, Fuel
Michigan Alkali Co	Wyandotte	1901	15	Burning lime	Fuel
