= Lakeside Cemetery Chapel =

Historic cemetery in Massachusetts, United States

- U.S. National Register of Historic Places
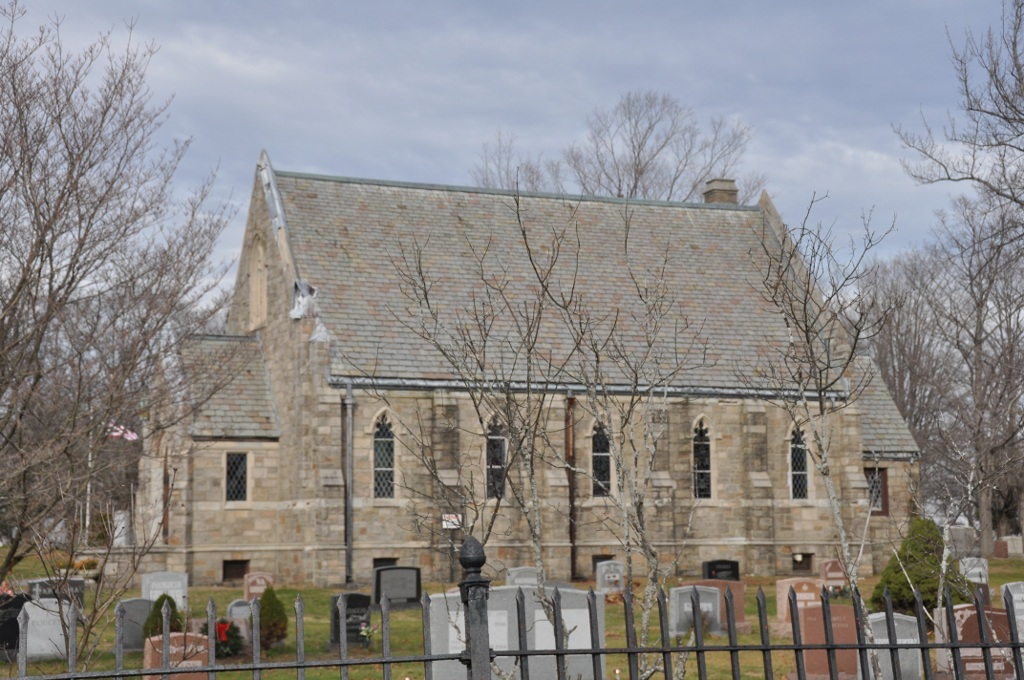

- Location within Massachusetts Location within the United States
- Location: Wakefield, Massachusetts
- Coordinates: 42°30′36″N 71°4′51″W
- Built: 1932
- Architectural style: Late Gothic Revival
- MPS: Wakefield MRA
- NRHP reference No.: 89000745
- Added to NRHP: July 6, 1989

The Lakeside Cemetery Chapel is a historic chapel in Lakeside Cemetery, on North Avenue in Wakefield, Massachusetts. The stone chapel, built 1913, is one of a few Neo-Gothic buildings in the town. Roughly resembling English country churches, the building has a steeply pitched slate roof, with sidewalls containing supporting buttresses. The front and rear of the chapel both have projecting entry sections that repeat the sharply pitched gable.

The chapel was listed on the National Register of Historic Places in 1989.

== See also ==
- National Register of Historic Places listings in Wakefield, Massachusetts
- National Register of Historic Places listings in Middlesex County, Massachusetts
