= Lakeside Garden =

Lakeside Garden may refer to:

In Hong Kong

- Lakeside Garden, a public housing estate

In Singapore

- Lakeside Garden, part of Jurong Lake Gardens at Jurong East, Singapore
