= Lakeside Township =

Lakeside Township may refer to:

- Lakeside Township, Aitkin County, Minnesota
- Lakeside Township, Cottonwood County, Minnesota
- Lakeside Township, Meade County, South Dakota, in Meade County, South Dakota
