= Lakeside Union Elementary School District (Kings County, California) =

School district in California, United States

Address
- 9100 Jersey Avenue Hanford, California, 93230; United States

District information
- Type: Public
- Grades: K–8
- Superintendent: Dale Ellis
- Schools: 1
- NCES District ID: 0620760

Students and staff
- Students: 266 (2020–2021)
- Teachers: 15.0 (FTE)
- Staff: 19.67 (FTE)
- Student–teacher ratio: 17.73:1

Other information
- Website: www.lakeside.k12.ca.us

Lakeside Union Elementary School District is a public school district based in the semi-rural town of Hanford in Kings County, California, United States. It consists of a single school serving students in grades kindergarten through 8. It is governed by a five-member elected board.
