= Lakeside Park, Guildford =

Nature reserve in Surrey, England

Coordinates: 51.258°N 0.729°W

Lakeside Park
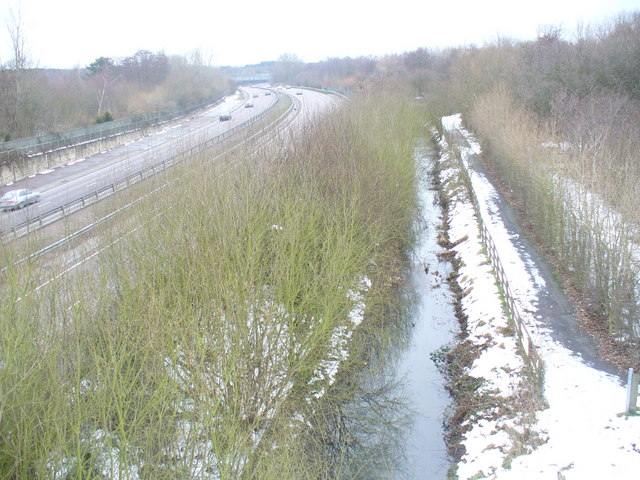
- Interactive map of Lakeside Park
- Type: Local Nature Reserve
- Location: Ash Vale, Surrey
- OS grid: SU 888 517
- Area: 14.47 hectares (35.8 acres)
- Manager: Guildford Borough Council

Lakeside Park is a 14.7-hectare (36-acre) Local Nature Reserve in Ash Vale west of Guildford in Surrey. It is owned and managed by Guildford Borough Council.

The Blackwater River runs through this wetland site, which also has ponds, lakes, reed beds, an orchid meadow and wet woodland. Flora include water violet, bee orchid and ragged robin. There are bats, common blue butterflies and hairy dragonflies.

There is access from Lakeside Road in Ash.
