= Lakeside, Shreveport, Louisiana =

Coordinates: 32.505°N 93.787°W

Lakeside is a residential neighborhood in Shreveport, Louisiana, USA.

In the 1920s and '30s, many of the area's houses were shotgun-style homes that contained no indoor plumbing and had rental rates ranging from $1.25 to $2.50 per week. The homes were built on rough land surrounded by unpaved streets and sidewalks, from the end of the American Civil War (1861–1865) through the 1920s.

Lakeside Acres was built in the 1960s and housed many of the area's doctors, teachers, lawyers and other upper middle-class citizens. The homes in Lakeside Acres still stand today, while many other Allendale area homes are dilapidated and some are being torn down for new structures.

The area's first public housing complex, Elamito Terrace, was completed in 1951. The complex was renamed Jackson Heights prior to 2006 when the structure was demolished to construct new apartments for the elderly.

In 1992, Mack McCarter, of Shreveport/Bossier Community Renewal (SBCR), began building relationships with other Shreveport residents to do something about the racial tensions and the resulting social problems within Shreveport. In 2001, the Shreveport-Bossier Community Renewal partnered with The Fuller Center for Housing to start building low-income homes with hopes of revitalizing the neighborhood. This good work has continued and endured for over twenty years with new construction underway in 2022.

== Schools ==
- Booker T. Washington High School
- West Shreveport Elementary School
- J.S. Clark Middle School
