= Lakeside Village, Virginia =

Unincorporated community in Virginia, United States

Coordinates: 37°39′49″N 78°10′42″W

Lakeside Village is an unincorporated community in Cumberland County, in the U.S. state of Virginia.
