= Lakeside Park (Owasco, New York) =

- U.S. National Register of Historic Places
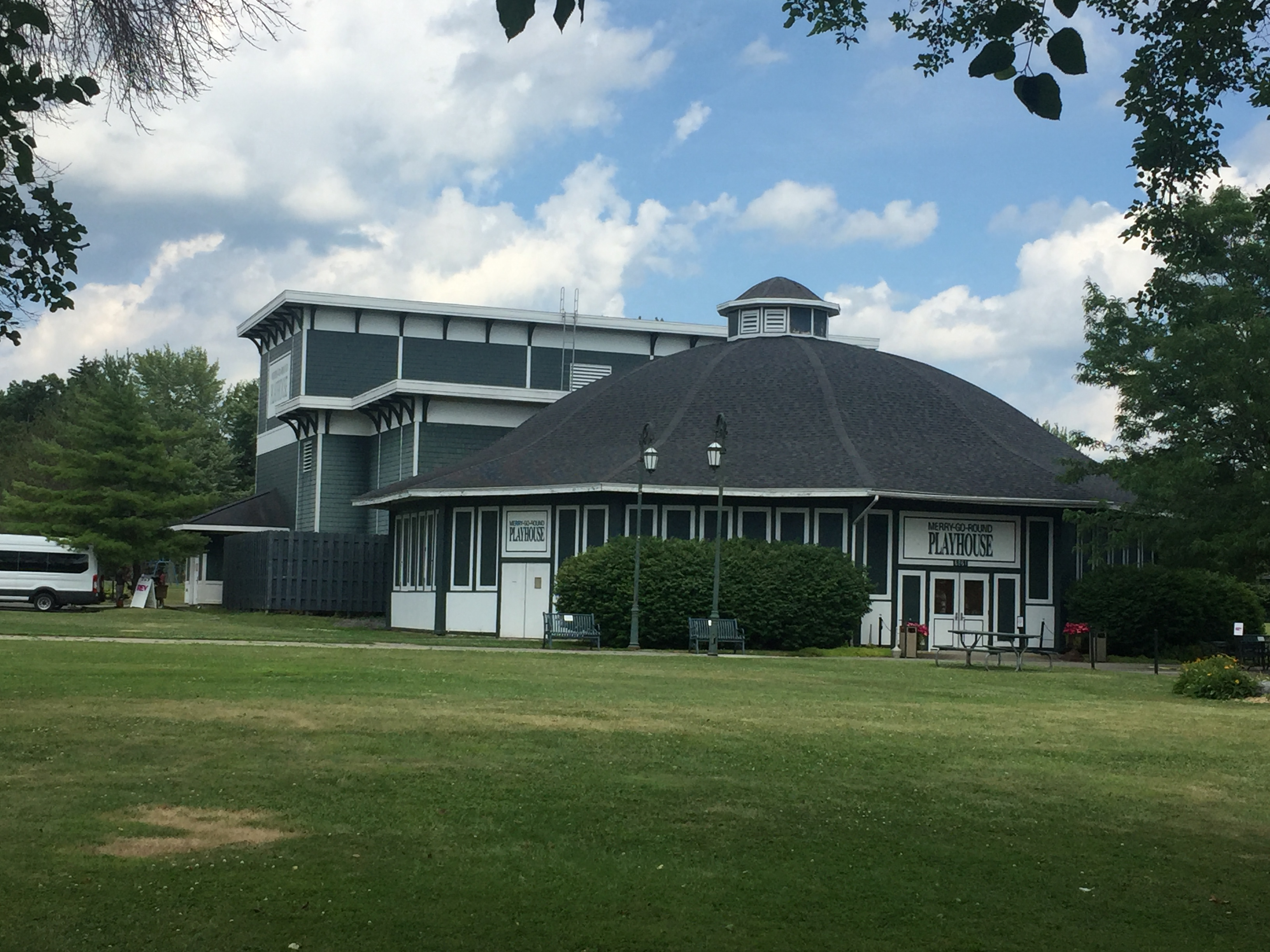

- Location within New York Location within the United States
- Location: NY 38A at Owasco Lake, Owasco, New York
- Coordinates: 42°54′9″N 76°32′14″W
- Area: 25 acres (10 ha)
- Built: 1912
- Architect: Merrick & Randall
- Architectural style: Colonial Revival
- NRHP reference No.: 89001790
- Added to NRHP: October 30, 1989

The Lakeside Park in Owasco, New York is a historic "pleasure ground" park located on Owasco Lake in Cayuga County, New York. It is a 40 acres (16 ha) park located within the boundaries of Emerson Park, a 130-acre (53 ha) municipal park system. The property includes four contributing design and architectural features: the remaining 25 acres (10 ha) of the park, including the primary and secondary paths and walkways, vistas, vegetation, and cast-iron lampposts and benches; and the Pavilion, Carousel Shelter, and Refreshment / Concession Stand. The park was originally designed and laid out in 1895 by the Auburn and Syracuse Electric Railroad Company. A Charles I. D. Looff carousel was installed in 1900. In 1908, this ride was replaced by another Looff carousel. The focal point of the property is the Pavilion; a Colonial Revival style dance hall and restaurant facility completed in July 1912. The Carousel Shelter, a twelve-sided structure built in 1921, once held a 1915 Herschell Spillman Company carousel with 51 animals. In 1972, it was converted into a summer theater. The Refreshment / Concession was also built in 1921 and moved to its present location in 1921.

It was listed on the National Register of Historic Places in 1989.

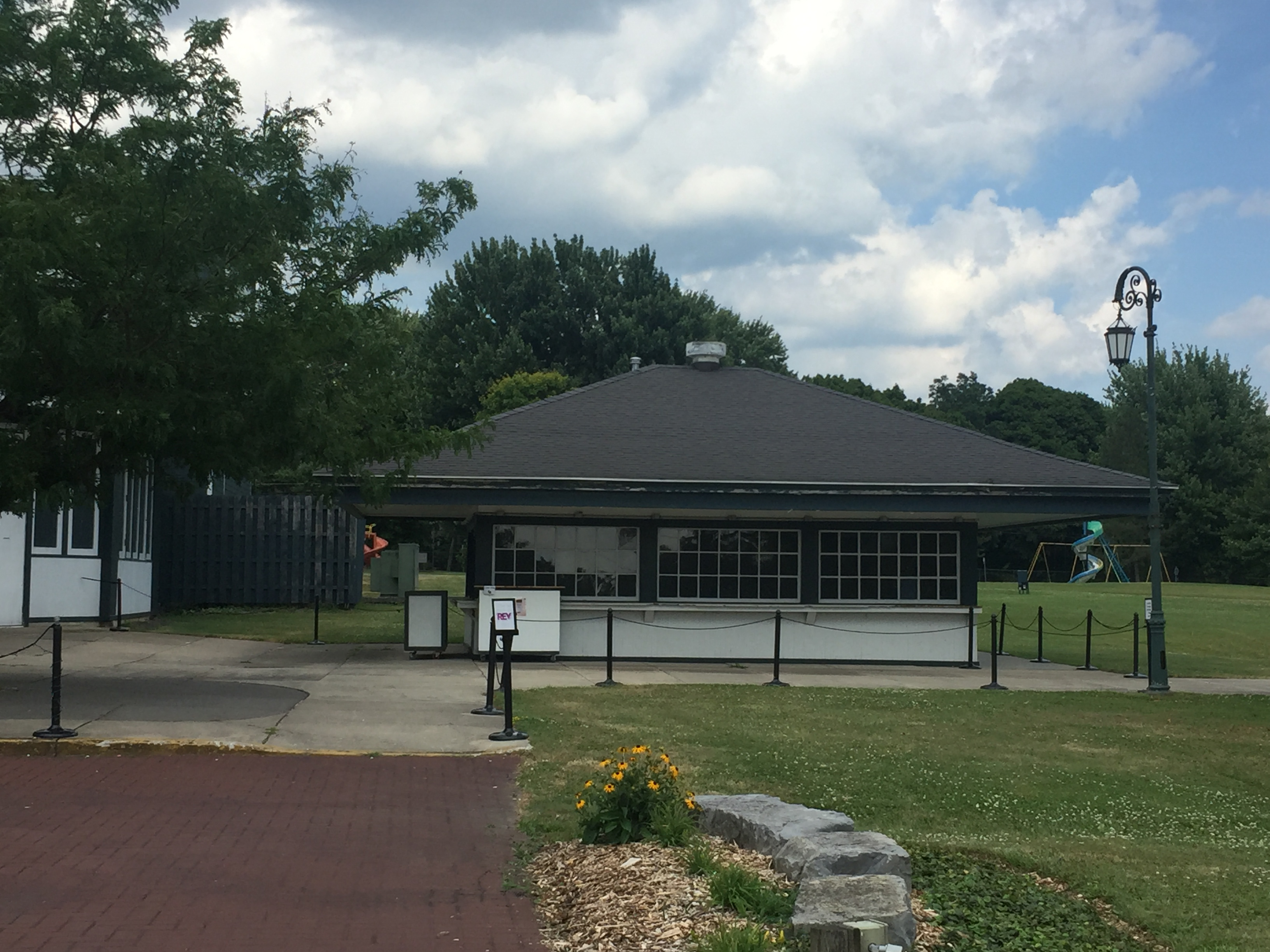

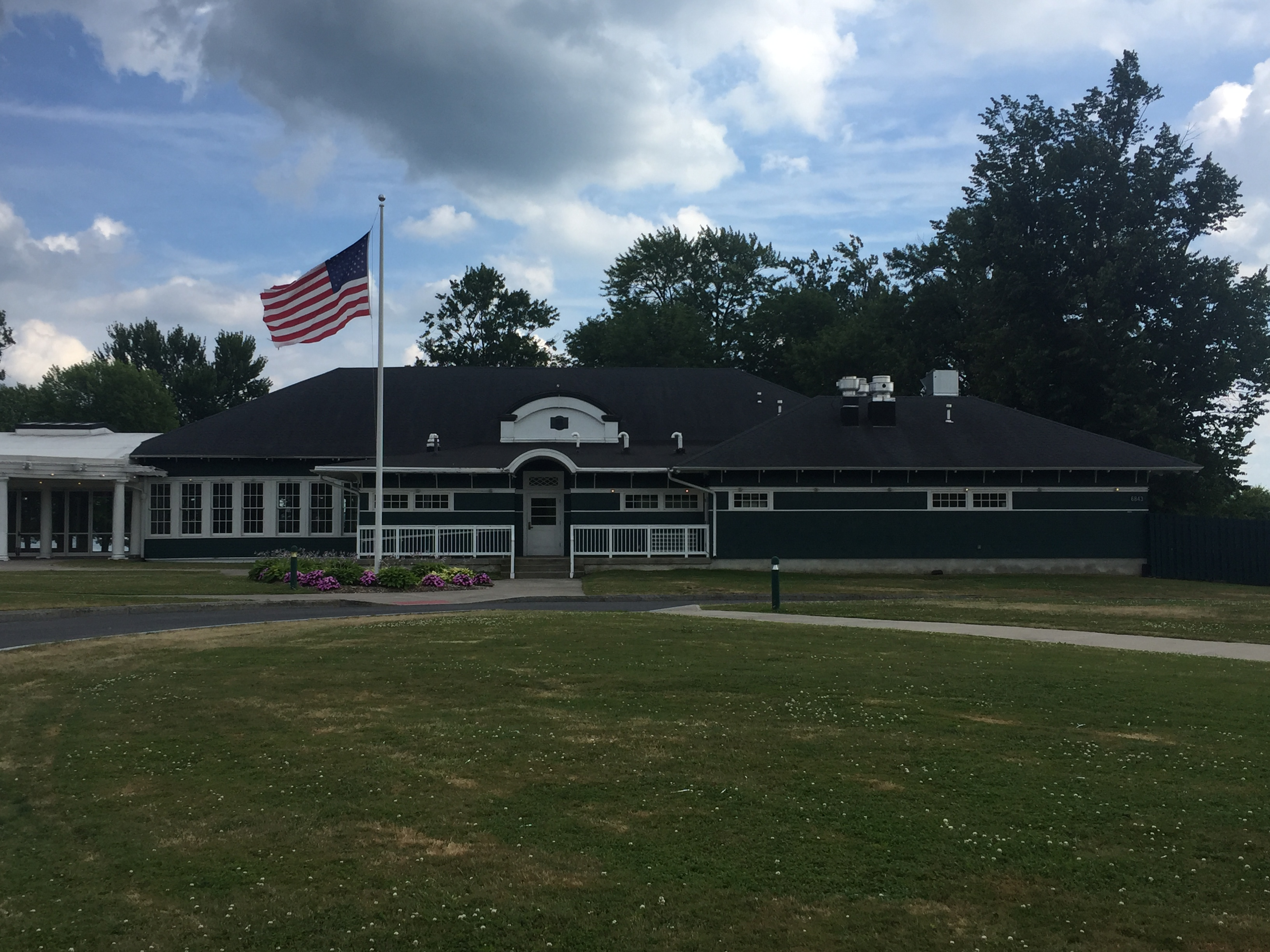
