= Lakeside station =

Lakeside station may refer to:

- Lakeside MRT station, a rapid transit station in Singapore
- Lakeside railway station, Melbourne in Australia
- Lakeside railway station, Queensland in Australia
- Lakeside railway station (England), a stop on the Lakeside and Haverthwaite Railway, a heritage railway in Cumbria, England
