= Dominick & Dickerman =

American financial services company

Dominick and Dickerman LLC
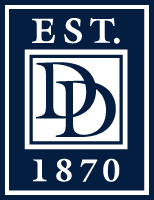
- Type: Private
- Industry: Financial services
- Founded: New York City, New York, U.S. (June 15, 1870)
- Headquarters: New York City
- Website: www.dominickanddickerman.com

Dominick and Dickerman LLC is an investment and merchant banking firm headquartered in New York City. It also has offices in Basel, Switzerland. From 1899 to 2015, the firm was known as Dominick and Dominick but after selling off its wealth management business, the firm reverted to its original name, Dominick and Dickerman.

The firm, founded in 1870, is one of the oldest, continuously operated financial services institutions in the United States. Dominick & Dickerman LLC has individual and corporate clients that it serves through three business divisions: Private Wealth Management; Investment Banking; and Institutional Sales.

Private Wealth Management offers wealth management advice, including investment strategies, asset allocation, wealth and estate planning, insurance products and alternative investments. The Investment Banking team assists public and private corporations by raising capital, developing and implementing strategic merger and acquisition plans, and advising senior management teams on a variety of governance, operations and growth issues.

Institutional Sales recommends and executes trading strategies for institutional clients in the United States and abroad. Dominick & Dominick LLC is a member of the Securities Investor Protection Corporation and the Financial Industry Regulatory Authority.

== History ==
=== Founding ===
The company was founded on June 15, 1870, as Dominick & Dickerman by William Gayer Dominick and Watson Bradley Dickerman. Dominick was born in Chicago, and moved to New York as a child. In 1869, at the age of 25, he purchased membership on the New York Stock Exchange. At the NYSE, Dominick met Connecticut-born Dickerman and they went into business forming a stock brokerage firm. Dominick's brothers, George and Bayard Dominick, also joined the Exchange and became partners in the firm.

Dominick & Dickerman opened its first branch in 1889 in Cincinnati, where the firm was one of only two exchange members. A year later, Dickerman left the firm when he was elected president of the New York Stock Exchange. He would serve as president from 1890 to 1892, then return to the firm. His cofounder, William Dominick, died in 1895 at the age of 50 to typhoid fever. Dickerman would retire in 1909, dying at the age of 77 in 1923.

Dominick & Dickerman changed its name in 1899 to Dominick & Dominick, adding several new partners including Milnor B. Dominick, Andrew V. Stout, J. A. Barnard, and Bernon S. Prentice. The firm was one of the original sources for closed-end funds, launching The Dominick fund, Inc in 1920 by selling 200,000 shares for a raise of $10 million. Despite the stock market crash in 1929, the fund survived and was listed in 1959 on the NYSE before it was merged with Putnam Fund in 1973.

=== Expansion ===
In 1936 Dominick & Dominick expanded through acquisition, merging with A. Iselin & Co., also one of Wall Street's oldest firms. Several months earlier the patriarch of the firm, Adrian Iselin, died at the age of 89. He had joined the firm, which his father Adrian Georg Iselin formed, as a 22-year-old in 1868. At the time of the merger, Dominick & Dominick had 13 partners, including Gayer G. Dominick (senior partner since 1926), Bayard Dominick, and Gardner D. Stout. It next picked up several partners from Iselin & Co., as well as Iselin Securities Corporation, which brought with it an office in Paris, and the Iselin Corporation of Canada with its office in Montreal. Because Dominick & Dominick already maintained a London office, the London office of Iselin Securities was closed. Other European offices were subsequently opened, and Dominick & Dominick soon had a presence in all of the major cities in Europe.

=== World War II ===
A large number of the firm's employees and partners entered the military, including Gayer Dominick. The firm was content to just keep its doors opened and operate. Gayer Dominick had been with the firm since 1909 after graduating from Yale University. In 1935 he was elected a governor of the New York Stock Exchange and helped to hire the first paid president of the Exchange, at the behest of the new Securities and Exchange Commission (SEC). He then left the family firm in 1938 to enter public service, working for the Office of Price Administration in the Roosevelt administration.

=== Post-War expansion ===
After World War II came to an end and following a brief economic recession as the United States reverted to a peacetime footing, the economy enjoyed a long period of growth. Dominick & Dominick benefited from the country's prosperity. Some of the firm's most notable transactions during the postwar years involved Yonkers, New York-based Alexander Smith Carpet Company and Canada's Great Plains Oil. In the late 1950s Dominick & Dominick was also part of a banking syndicate that managed the initial public offering (IPO) of stock issued by Arvida Corporation, which was formed in Florida in 1958 to sell the real estate holdings of Arthur Vining Davis. The IPO gained attention because of objections raised by the SEC to the way the managers had announced the stock sale before filing a registration statement with the SEC, a violation of the law.

Dominick & Dominick ended registration as a partnership, reorganizing as a corporation in 1964. The 1960s also saw the firm spread its operation across the country, acquiring the investment bank of Buffalo-based Schoellkopf, Hutton & Pomeroy, and taking advantage of a bull market to build up a domestic retail brokerage business. In 1962 an office in Chicago was opened. Dominick & Dominick gained a major presence in New England in 1966 by acquiring the firm of Townsend, Dabney, Tyson. Not only did the firm pick up a large Boston office but another 15 offices throughout the Northeast. About 30 additional branch offices across the United States were opened by the end of the 1960s.

In 1970 Dominick & Dominick pursued a merger with Clark, Dodge & Co., Inc., a similar size firm, but called it off, electing instead to continue a program of opening new offices and pursuing the acquisition of smaller firms. This plan was also eventually terminated, however, as the stock market began to experience one of the worst bear markets in a generation, and Dominick & Dominick found that it had stretched itself far too thin.

=== Dark period ===
Strapped for cash the firm sold four of its five seats on the New York Stock Exchange and one of two seats on the American Stock Exchange. It also sold a significant stake in the business for $7.25 million to an investment group led by Pierce National Life Insurance Company (now Liberty Corporation), which was in turn controlled by Joe L. Allbritton, founder of Allbritton Communications Company. While the infusion of capital was welcome, Dominick & Dominick still found itself in a difficult position and sold its domestic retail brokerage business and the bulk of its branch offices.

The firm's chairman and chief executive, Peter M. Kennedy, explained to The New York Times that "a national retail structure is not right for a firm of our size. We either had to be bigger or smaller." He added, "We are not going out of business. We are just changing the nature of our business."

In 1973, The Dominick fund merged with Putnam Fund and, by 1975, was no longer registered as an investment company.

=== 21st century ===
In October 2003 the firm brought in a new president and CEO, hiring 58-year-old Michael J. Campbell.

Dominick & Dominick's first branch office to open under Campbell's management was in Miami in the fall of 2004.

In 2007, Dominick & Dominick launched a new risk arbitrage group.

In 2015, the company was renamed Dominick & Dickerman. That same year, Memphis, Tennessee-based Wunderlich Securities purchased the company’s wealth management business.

== Stanford Financial Group receivership ==
On November 13, 2009, the US District Court ordered the Brokerage Accounts of Stanford Financial Group Brokerage to be transferred to Dominick & Dominick LLC. The Stanford Group was the firm run by Allen Stanford. Both Stanford Group Company and Dominick & Dominick LLC use Pershing LLC as their clearing firm. The transfer became effective on January 20, 2010.
