= Lakeside Inn (Lakeside, Michigan) =

- U.S. National Register of Historic Places
- Michigan State Historic Site
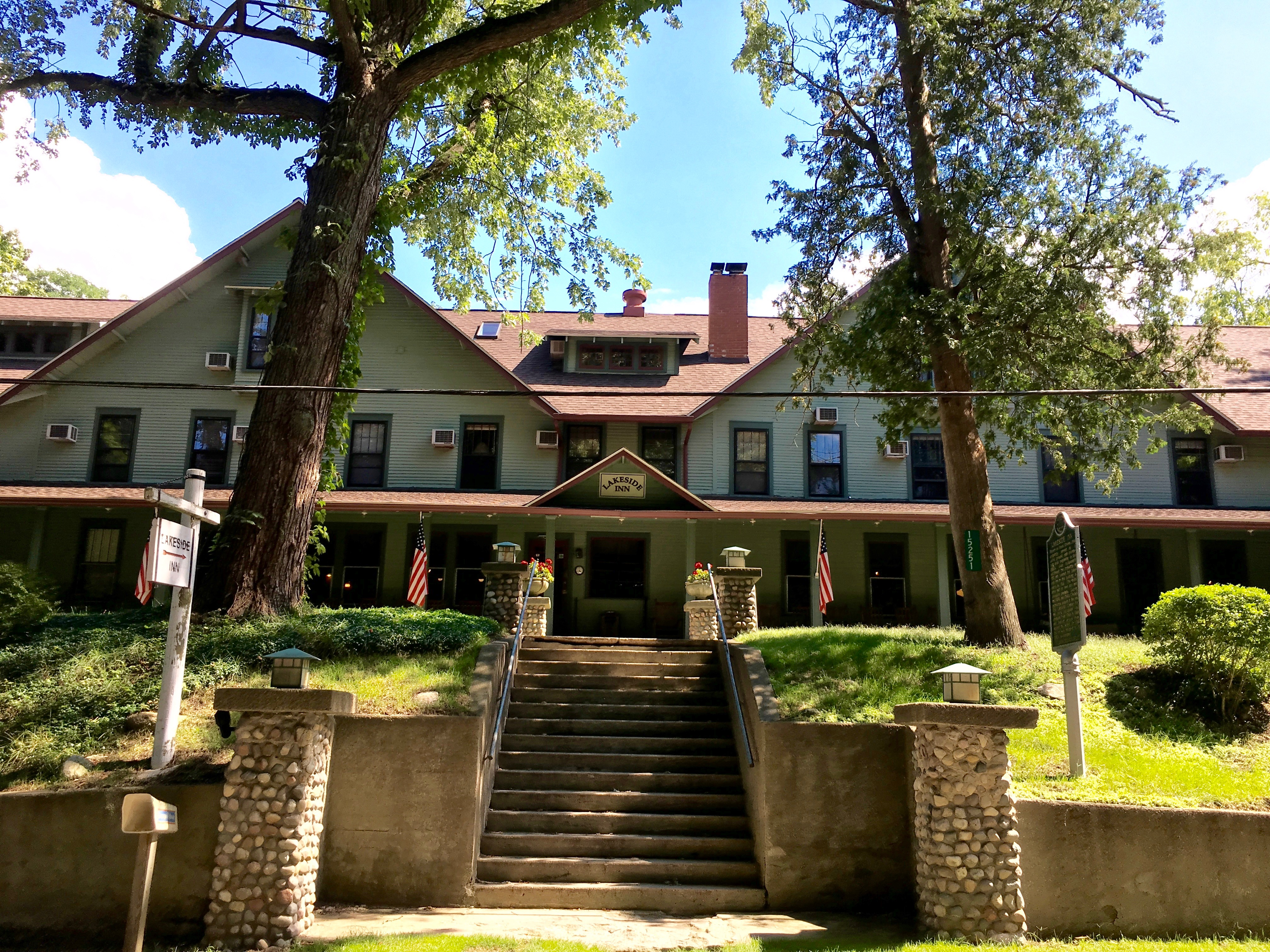

- Location within Michigan Location within the United States
- Interactive map
- Location: 15251 Lakeshore Rd., Lakeside, Michigan
- Coordinates: 41°50′35″N 86°40′44″W
- Area: 2 acres (0.81 ha)
- Architectural style: Bungalow/craftsman
- NRHP reference No.: 09000521
- Added to NRHP: July 16, 2009

The Lakeside Inn is a historic hotel located at 15251 Lakeshore Road in Lakeside, Michigan. It was listed on the National Register of Historic Places in 2009.

== History ==
This area was first settled in 1844 by Vermont natives Alfred and Mary Ames, who purchased property that included the present site of the Lakeside Inn. A small settlement was established nearby in 1846; when the Chicago and Michigan Lake Shore Railroad was constructed in the late 1870s, a station was built at the site, then called Lakeside. By the end of the 19th century, the location around what is now the inn was a popular recreational spot. The site across the road, Ames Grove, was owned by Alfred and Mary Ames's son Fisher Ames, and was used for picnics and other local gatherings. At the same time, the area began to attract summer vacationers, and local families began taking boarders and building small resorts.

In 1901, John J. and Nancy E. Aylsworth purchased several tracts of land at Lakeside, including the property on which this inn now stands. The construction date of the inn is not documented, but was probably in the early 1910s for the Aylsworths. Along with the inn, several cottages were constructed. John Aylsworth died in December 1917; two years later Nancy Aylsworth transferred the inn to their son Arthur and his wife Grace. At about that time, a substantial addition was constructed on the inn. In 1922, the inn was turned over to the Lakeside Property Owners Trust, a local developer trust tasked with fostering appropriate development and keep out undesirables. The inn remained under Arthur Aylsworth's management, and in 1930 golf, tennis, and swimming facilities were added, and the inn was renamed the Lakeside Park Country Club, and membership was required. Although not explicitly stated, it is likely that these changes were instituted to prohibit Jews from patronizing the inn.

Arthur and Grace Aylsworth divorced in 1930, and Arthur re-purchased the inn from the trust. He continued to operate with his second wife Virginia until Virginia's death in 1953 and his in 1955. The inn declined over the next decade, until 1968 when it was purchased by John and Kay Wilson. Wilson converted the inn into the "Lakeside Center for the Arts," running his print business in part of the downstairs and taking in artists from across the country. In 1994, Devereux Bowly purchased the inn and completely refurbished it, reopening it as a hotel in 1995. As of 2021, the inn is still operating and is owned by Bowly.

== Description ==
The Lakeside Inn is a 2-1/2 story, broad fronted, side gabled wood frame structure sited on a low rise overlooking Lake Michigan. It is covered with clapboard. A pair of cross gables face the lake, as does an open shed-roof veranda which extends across the entire facade. Shed roof dormers penetrate the roof. The exterior possesses a simple Arts-and-Crafts finish, including exposed rafter ends on the eaves.

The interior contains a lobby on the first floor, with a large cobblestone fireplace. Off the lobby are a dining room/ballroom, lounge, and bar area. Two guest rooms are on the first floor, with the remainder on the second and third floors.
