= Lakeside College =

Location
- 2 Portobello Road; Pakenham, Victoria, 3810; Australia; 38°3′55″S 145°27′20″E

Information
- Motto: Learn. Care. Achieve. Giving Glory to God and Serving the World in Love.
- Denomination: Lutheran Church of Australia
- Established: 2006
- Founder: Lutheran Church of Australia
- Principal: Robert Tassoni
- Chaplain: Fiona Scheffer
- Years offered: P–12
- Gender: Coeducational
- Enrolment: 650
- Song: Great Things Happen by the Lake!
- Website: www.lakeside.vic.edu.au

Lakeside College, established in 2006, is a co-educational, private P–12 school located in Pakenham, Victoria, Australia, associated with the Lutheran Church of Australia. The founding Principal was Peter Miller.

The College caters for 583 students from Foundation to Year 12.

== History ==
The school opened in February 2006 as a member of Lutheran Education Australia. It has grown since then to now be a full P to Year 12 school, with 10 students graduating from the first Year 12 class in 2011. The first dux of the college was Sam Controneo.

The College changed its name to "Lakeside College" in 2015.

Robert Tassoni commenced as the Principal of the College in 2023.
