= Michigan's 21st Senate district =

American legislative district

Michigan's 21st State Senate district
Senator
Sarah Anthony; D–Lansing
- Demographics: 69.4% White; 11.8% Black; 8.7% Hispanic; 3.4% Asian; 0.2% Native American; 0.8% Other; 5.6% Multiracial
- Population (2024): 263,341

Michigan's 21st Senate district is one of 38 districts in the Michigan Senate. The 21st district was created by the 1850 Michigan Constitution, as the 1835 constitution only permitted a maximum of eight senate districts. It has been represented by Democrat Sarah Anthony since 2023.

== Geography ==
District 21 encompasses all of Eaton County, as well as part of Ingham County.

=== 2011 Apportionment Plan ===
District 21, as dictated by the 2011 Apportionment Plan, covered Berrien, Cass, and St. Joseph Counties in far southwest Michigan. Communities in the district included Benton Harbor, Niles, St. Joseph, Buchanan, Benton Heights, Fair Plain, Paw Paw Lake, Dowagiac, Sturgis, Three Rivers, Benton Township, Lincoln Township, Niles Township, and St. Joseph Township.

The district was located entirely within Michigan's 6th congressional district, and overlapped with the 59th, 78th, and 79th districts of the Michigan House of Representatives. It bordered the state of Indiana, as well as Lake Michigan.

== List of senators ==
Senator	Party	Dates	Residence	Notes
Frederick W. Curtenius	Whig	1853–1854	Kalamazoo	
Ebenezer Lakin Brown	Republican	1855–1856	Schoolcraft	
John Roberts	Republican	1857–1858	Hastings	
Harvey Williams	Republican	1859–1860	Charlotte	
Norman Bailey	Republican	1861–1862	Hastings	
Smith W. Fowler	Republican	1863–1864	Charlotte	
John M. Nevins	Republican	1865–1866	Hastings	
James Turner	Republican	1867–1868	Lansing	
Stephen Pearl	Republican	1869–1870	Duplain	
Isaac M. Cravath	Republican	1871–1872	Lansing	Died in office.
John N. Mellen	Republican	1873–1876	Romeo	
Crockett McElroy	Republican	1877–1880	St. Clair	
James R. McGurk	Republican	1881–1882	Capac	
James William Belknap	Republican	1883–1886	Greenville	
John W. Moon	Republican	1887–1888	Muskegon	
Jacob Den Herder	Republican	1889–1890	Zeeland	
George Ford Porter	Democratic	1891–1892	Gooding	
Edwin G. Fox	Republican	1893–1894	Mayville	
John L. Preston	Republican	1895–1898	Columbiaville	
Theron W. Atwood	Republican	1899–1902	Caro	
William E. Brown	Republican	1903–1906	Lapeer	
William McKay	Republican	1907–1908	Caro	Died in office.
Edwin G. Fox	Republican	1909–1910	Mayville	Died in office.
John Conley	Democratic	1911–1912	Lapeer	
Terry T. Corliss	Republican	1913–1916	Mayville	
Charles B. Scully	Republican	1917–1920	Almont	
Burney E. Brower	Republican	1921–1926	Jackson	
Ari H. Woodruff	Republican	1927–1932	Wyandotte	
John Nichczynski	Democratic	1933–1934	Detroit	Died in office.
Sidney C. Gray	Democratic	1935–1936	Detroit	
Joseph C. Roosevelt	Democratic	1937–1938	Detroit	
Stanley Nowak	Democratic	1939–1948	Detroit	
Robert A. Haggerty	Democratic	1949–1954	Detroit	
Patrick J. Doyle	Democratic	1955–1962	Dearborn	
William D. Ford	Democratic	1963–1964	Taylor	
Garry E. Brown	Republican	1965–1966	Schoolcraft	
Anthony Stamm	Republican	1967–1974	Kalamazoo	Died in office.
Jack Welborn	Republican	1974–1982	Kalamazoo	
Harmon G. Cropsey	Republican	1983–1990	Decatur	
Paul Wartner	Republican	1991–1994	Portage	
Dale L. Shugars	Republican	1995–2002	Portage	
Ron Jelinek	Republican	2003–2010	Three Oaks	
John Proos	Republican	2011–2018	St. Joseph	
Kim LaSata	Republican	2019–2022	Bainbridge Township	
Sarah Anthony	Democratic	2023–present	Lansing	

== Recent election results ==
=== 2020s ===
2026 Michigan Senate election
Primary election
Party	Candidate	Votes	%
Democratic	Sarah Anthony (incumbent)	41,633	100
Total votes		41,633	100
Republican	Josh Burns	17,770	100
Total votes		17,770	100
General election
Democratic	Sarah Anthony (incumbent)	77,089	62.54
Republican	Josh Burns	46,166	37.46
Total votes		123,255	100
Democratic hold			

2022 Michigan Senate election, District 21
Primary election
Party	Candidate	Votes	%
Republican	Nkenge Ayanna Roberston	17,313	98.8
Republican	Ricky John Salisbury	205	1.2
Total votes		17,518	100
General election
Democratic	Sarah Anthony	68,534	60.3
Republican	Nkenge Ayanna Robertson	45,145	39.7
Total votes		113,679	100
Democratic gain from Republican			

=== 2018 ===
2018 Michigan Senate election, District 21
Primary election
Party	Candidate	Votes	%
Republican	Kim LaSata	15,344	54.6
Republican	Dave Pagel	12,761	45.4
Total votes		28,105	100
General election
Republican	Kim LaSata	58,164	58.1
Democratic	Ian Haight	41,897	41.9
Total votes		100,061	100
Republican hold			

=== 2014 ===
2014 Michigan Senate election, District 21
Party	Candidate	Votes	%
Republican	John Proos (incumbent)	45,586	64.5
Democratic	Bette Pierman	25,090	35.5
Total votes		70,676	100
Republican hold			

=== Federal and statewide results ===
Year	Office	Results
2020	President	Trump 57.3 – 40.8%
2018	Senate	James 56.5 – 41.0%
2018	Governor	Schuette 54.6 – 41.9%
2016	President	Trump 57.3 – 37.5%
2014	Senate	Land 57.1 – 39.2%
2014	Governor	Snyder 56.9 – 40.1%
2012	President	Romney 54.1 – 45.0%
2012	Senate	Hoekstra 50.6 – 45.8%

== Historical district boundaries ==
Map	Description	Apportionment Plan	Notes
	Barry County (part); Barry Township; Carlton Township; Hope Township; Irving Township; Orangeville Township; Prairieville Township; Rutland Township; Thornapple Township; Kalamazoo County; St. Joseph County (part); Burr Oak Township; Colon Township; Fawn River Township; Florence Township; Leonidas Township; Mendon Township; Nottawa Township; Sherman Township; Sturgis; Sturgis Township	1964 Apportionment Plan	
	Cass County (part); Porter Township (part); Kalamazoo County (part); Excluding; Alamo Township; Charleston Township; St. Joseph County (part); Constantine Township; Fabius Township; Florence Township; Flowerfield Township; Lockport Township; Mendon Township; Mottville Township; Nottawa Township; Park Township; Sherman Township; Sturgis Township; White Pigeon Township; Van Buren County (part); Almena Township; Pine Grove Township; Waverly Township	1972 Apportionment Plan	
	Cass County; Kalamazoo County (part); Alamo Township; Brady Township; Charleston Township; Climax Township; Comstock Township; Galesburg; Kalamazoo Township (part); Oshtemo Township; Parchment; Pavilion Township; Portage; Prairie Ronde Township; Ross Township; Schoolcraft Township; Texas Township; Wakeshma Township; St. Joseph County	1982 Apportionment Plan	
	Kalamazoo County; St. Joseph County (part); Mendon Township; Park Township	1992 Apportionment Plan	
	Berrien County; Cass County; Van Buren County (part); Almena Township; Arlington Township; Bangor; Bangor Township; Bloomingdale Township; Columbia Township; Covert Township; Decatur Township; Geneva Township; Gobles; Hamilton Township; Hartford; Hartford Township; Keeler Township; Lawrence Township; Grove Township; Porter Township; South Haven (part); South Haven Township; Waverly Township	2001 Apportionment Plan	
	Berrien County; Cass County; St. Joseph County	2011 Apportionment Plan	
