= Michigan's 22nd Senate district =

American legislative district

Michigan's 22nd State Senate district
Senator
Lana Theis; R–Brighton
- Demographics: 91.9% White; 0.8% Black; 3% Hispanic; 0.9% Asian; 0.2% Native American; 0.3% Other; 2.9% Multiracial
- Population (2024): 262,372

Michigan's 22nd Senate district is one of 38 districts in the Michigan Senate. The 22nd district was created by the 1850 Michigan Constitution, as the 1835 constitution only permitted a maximum of eight senate districts. It has been represented by Republican Lana Theis since 2019, succeeding fellow Republican Joe Hune.

== Geography ==
District 22 encompasses all of Livingston County, as well as part of Genesee, Ingham, and Shiawassee counties.

=== 2011 Apportionment Plan ===
District 22, as dictated by the 2011 Apportionment Plan, covered all of Livingston County and most of western Washtenaw County in exurban Detroit, including the communities of Brighton, Howell, Fowlerville, Whitmore Lake, Chelsea, Dexter, Brighton Township, Genoa Township, Green Oak Township, Hamburg Township, Hartland Township, Oceola Township, Tyrone Township, Marion Township, and Scio Township.

The district was largely located within Michigan's 8th congressional district, also extended into the 7th and 12th districts. It overlapped with the 42nd, 47th, and 52nd districts of the Michigan House of Representatives.

== List of senators ==
Senator	Party	Dates	Residence	Notes
James W. Hickock	Democratic	1853–1854	Walton Township	
Henry A. Goodyear	Democratic	1855–1856	Hastings	
Isaac T. Hollister	Republican	1857–1858	Victor Township	
Whitney Jones	Republican	1859–1860	Lansing	
Randolph Strickland	Republican	1861–1862	DeWitt	
Lauren K. Hewitt	Democratic	1863	Lansing	Resigned.
Henry M. Perrin	Republican	1865–1866	St. Johns	
David Lewis Latourette	Republican	1867–1868	Fenton	
Jerome W. Turner	Republican	1869–1870	Corunna	
Mylo L. Gay	Democratic	1871–1872	Howell	
Frederick L. Wells	Republican	1873–1876	Port Huron	
John C. Waterbury	Republican	1877–1878	Lexington	
Benjamin W. Huston Jr.	Republican	1879–1880	Vassar	
Richard Winsor	Republican	1881–1882	Port Austin	
James W. Hine	Republican	1883–1884	Lowell	
John L. Curtis	Greenback	1885–1886	Grand Rapids	Elected on a Fusionist ticket, also backed by the Democratic Party.
Edward E. Edwards	Republican	1887–1888	Fremont	
Theron S. Gurney	Republican	1889–1890	Hart	
Enoch T. Mugford	Democratic	1891–1892	Hart	
Wellington R. Burt	Democratic	1893–1894	Saginaw	
Emory Townsend	Republican	1895–1896	Saginaw	
Henry M. Youmans	Democratic	1897–1898	Bridgeport	Elected on a Democratic, Populist and free silver ticket.
John Leidlein	Democratic	1899–1900	Saginaw	
John Baird	Republican	1901–1906	Zilwaukee	
Joseph H. Whitney	Republican	1907–1910	Merrill	
John Leidlein	Democratic	1911–1912	Saginaw	
G. Leo Weadock	Republican	1913–1914	Saginaw	
Frank H. McPhillips	Democratic	1915–1916	Saginaw	
Harvey A. Penney	Republican	1917–1926	Saginaw	
Chester M. Howell	Republican	1927–1932	Saginaw	
John Leidlein	Democratic	1933–1934	Saginaw	Died in office.
Dale D. Doyle	Democratic	1935–1936	Saginaw	
George W. Weadock II	Democratic	1937–1938	Saginaw	
Chester M. Howell	Republican	1939–1945	Saginaw	Resigned amid scandal.
William W. Lee	Republican	1945–1946	Saginaw	
John P. Schuch	Republican	1947–1950	Saginaw	
Donald W. Gilbert	Republican	1951–1954	Saginaw	
Clarence F. Graebner	Republican	1955–1962	Saginaw	
William J. Leppien	Republican	1963–1964	Saginaw	
Charles Zollar	Republican	1965–1978	Benton Harbor	
Harry Gast	Republican	1979–1994	St. Joseph	
William Van Regenmorter	Republican	1995–2002	Georgetown Township	Lived in Jenison until around 1997, and lived in Hudsonville until around 2001.
Valde Garcia	Republican	2003–2010	Howell	
Joe Hune	Republican	2011–2018	Whitmore Lake	Lived in Hamburg Township until around 2015.
Lana Theis	Republican	2019–present	Brighton	

== Recent election results ==
=== 2020s ===
2026 Michigan Senate election
Primary election
Party	Candidate	Votes	%
Republican	Mike Murphy	33,990	100
Total votes		33,990	100
Democratic	Robert Hower	31,050	100
Total votes		31,050	100
General election
Republican	Mike Murphy	87,884	60.3
Democratic	Robert Hower	57,858	39.7
Total votes		145,742	100
Republican hold			

2022 Michigan Senate election, District 22
Primary election
Party	Candidate	Votes	%
Republican	Lana Theis (incumbent)	24,384	57.6
Republican	Mike Detmer	17,939	42.4
Total votes		42,323	100
General election
Republican	Lana Theis (incumbent)	83,957	60.7
Democratic	Jordan Genso	50,738	36.7
Libertarian	Jon Elgas	2,478	1.8
Constitution	Victoria McCasey	1,198	0.9
Total votes		138,371	100
Republican hold			

=== 2018 ===
2018 Michigan Senate election, District 22
Primary election
Party	Candidate	Votes	%
Republican	Lana Theis	25,957	74.8
Republican	Joseph Converse Marinaro	8,732	25.2
Total votes		34,689	100
General election
Republican	Lana Theis	76,043	56.0
Democratic	Adam Dreher	57,167	42.1
Green	Eric Borregard	2,659	2.0
Total votes		135,869	100
Republican hold			

=== 2014 ===
2014 Michigan Senate election, District 22
Party	Candidate	Votes	%
Republican	Joe Hune (incumbent)	58,380	58.9
Democratic	Shari Pollesch	37,709	38.0
Libertarian	Jeff Wood	3,108	3.1
Total votes		99,197	100
Republican hold			

=== Federal and statewide results ===
Year	Office	Results
2020	President	Trump 54.4 – 44.0%
2018	Senate	James 53.9 – 44.6%
2018	Governor	Schuette 51.6 – 45.9%
2016	President	Trump 56.0 – 38.7%
2014	Senate	Land 50.5 – 45.0%
2014	Governor	Snyder 63.7 – 34.4%
2012	President	Romney 56.7 – 42.4%
2012	Senate	Hoekstra 49.2 – 47.4%

== Historical district boundaries ==
Map	Description	Apportionment Plan	Notes
	Berrien County; Cass County; St. Joseph County (part); Constantine Township; Fabius Township; Flowerfield Township; Lockport Township; Mottville Township; Park Township; Three Rivers; White Pigeon Township	1964 Apportionment Plan	
	Berrien County; Cass County (part); Excluding; Porter Township (part); Van Buren County (part); Antwerp Township; Bangor Township; Decatur Township; Hamilton Township; Hartford; Hartford Township; Keeler Township; Lawrence Township; Porter Township; Paw Paw Township	1972 Apportionment Plan	
	Berrien County; Van Buren County	1982 Apportionment Plan	
	Allegan County; Ottawa County (part); Georgetown Township; Holland; Holland Township; Hudsonville; Jamestown Township; Zeeland; Zeeland Township; Van Buren County	1992 Apportionment Plan	
	Ingham County (part); Bunker Hill Township; Leslie; Leslie Township; Mason; Stockbridge Township; Vevay Township; Livingston County; Shiawassee County	2001 Apportionment Plan	
	Livingston County; Washtenaw County (part); Ann Arbor (part); Bridgewater Township; Chelsea; Dexter Township; Freedom Township; Lima Township; Lodi Township (part); Lyndon Township; Manchester Township; Northfield Township; Saline Township (part); Scio Township (part); Sharon Township; Sylvan Township; Webster Township	2011 Apportionment Plan	
