= Hartford Public Schools (Michigan) =

School district in Michigan, U.S.

Address
- 115 School Street Hartford, Van Buren County, Michigan, 49057; United States

District information
- Grades: Kindergarten-12
- Superintendent: Nick Blackmer
- Schools: 4
- Budget: $20,429,000 2022-2023 expenditures
- NCES District ID: 2617880

Students and staff
- Students: 1,338 (2024-2025)
- Teachers: 67.57 (on an FTE basis) (2024-2025)
- Staff: 163.09 FTE (2024-2025)
- Student–teacher ratio: 19.8 (2024-2025)
- District mascot: Huskies

Other information
- Website: www.hpsmi.org

Hartford Public Schools is a public school district in Van Buren County, Michigan. It serves Hartford and parts of the townships of Bangor, Hartford, Keeler, and Lawrence.

== History ==
Hartford's previous high school was built in 1903. The two-story brick building had a stone foundation and a slate roof.

Ground was broken for the current middle/high school building on April 15, 1959. It opened for the 1960-1961 school year.

The new football field was dedicated during a game with St. Joseph Catholic School on September 23, 1960. Disaster struck when the visitors stands, which were wooden and five tiers high, collapsed. About 400 spectators were hurt, a few seriously, but the game continued. Without stands, the St. Joseph fans crowded the sidelines, some entering the field, and were threatened with forfeiture of the game. Yet ultimately, the St. Joseph Catholic team won 16-0.

Voters approved construction bond issues in 2014 and 2023 to renovate and expand school facilities. The former Woodland Elementary School was renamed Redwood Elementary when it reopened after renovations in 2017. Red Arrow Elementary, built in 1960, closed at the end of the 2016-2017 school year, and the schools merged at the Redwood site.

== Schools ==
Schools in Hartford Public Schools district
School	Address	Notes
Hartford High School	121 School Street, Hartford	Grades 9–12.
Hartford Middle School	141 School Street, Hartford	Grade 6-8.
Redwood Elementary	395 Woodside Drive, Hartford	Grades K-5.
Hartford Alternative Education	115 School Street, Hartford	Alternative high school.
