= Van Buren State Park (Michigan) =

Park in Michigan, USA

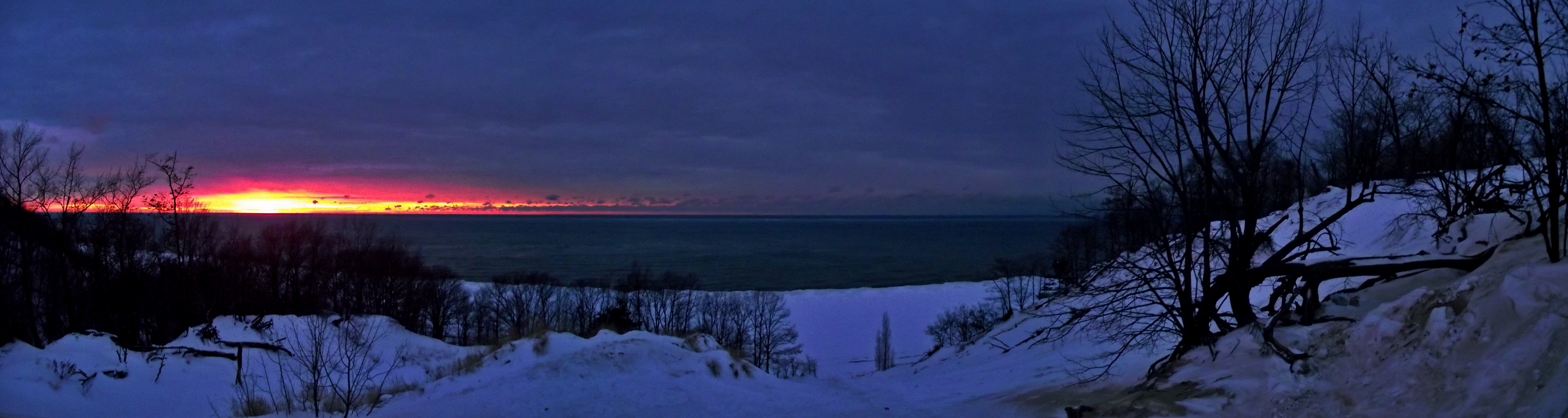
- Park at sunset in winter

- Location within Michigan Location within the United States
- Location: Van Buren County, Michigan, United States
- Nearest city: South Haven, Michigan
- Coordinates: 42°20′52″N 86°18′03″W
- Area: 400 acres (160 ha)
- Elevation: 646 feet (197 m)
- Established: 1966
- Administrator: Michigan Department of Natural Resources
- Designation: Michigan state park
- Website: Official website

Van Buren State Park is a 400-acre (160 ha) public recreation area on Lake Michigan four miles (6.4 km) south of South Haven, Michigan, United States. The state park, which is maintained and operated by the Michigan Department of Natural Resources, is located in the southwest corner of South Haven Township and the northwest corner of Covert Township, just north of the Palisades Nuclear Power Plant. The Van Buren County–owned North Point Conservation Area is located directly north of the park. The park has forested sand dunes, camping, and a swimming beach.

== History ==
The park was established in 1966 following the state's purchase of 167 acres (68 ha) from the Harry LaBar Drake family in 1965. Two subsequent land purchases further expanded the park's boundaries.

== Activities and amenities ==
The park offers swimming, picnicking, playground, 220-site campground, and access to Van Buren Trail State Park.
