= Hartford Public Schools =

Hartford Public Schools may refer to:

- Hartford Public Schools (Connecticut) in Hartford, Connecticut
- Hartford Public Schools (Michigan) in Van Buren County, Michigan
