= Cravath =

Cravath is a surname. Notable people with the surname include:

- Erastus Milo Cravath (1833–1900), American religious leader and educator
- Gavvy Cravath (1881–1963), American baseball player
- Isaac M. Cravath (1826–1872), American politician
- Jeff Cravath (1903–1953) American football player and coach
- Paul D. Cravath (1861–1940), American lawyer, partner at Cravath, Swaine & Moore; co-founder and a director of the Council on Foreign Relations
- Prosper Cravath (1809–1886), American farmer and lawyer
- Ruth Cravath (1902–1986), American stonework artist
