= Paw Paw Township, Michigan =

- Township
- Location within the state of Michigan Paw Paw Township, Michigan (the United States)
- Coordinates: 42°12′50″N 85°54′59″W
- Country: United States
- State: Michigan
- County: Van Buren

Area
  - Total: 37.0 sq mi (95.9 km^{2})
  - Land: 35.2 sq mi (91.2 km^{2})
  - Water: 1.8 sq mi (4.7 km^{2})
- Elevation: 761 ft (232 m)

Population (2020)
  - Total: 6,881
  - Density: 195/sq mi (75.4/km^{2})
- Time zone: UTC-5 (Eastern (EST))
  - Summer (DST): UTC-4 (EDT)
- ZIP code: 49079
- Area code: 269
- FIPS code: 26-63000
- GNIS feature ID: 1626886
- Website: Township website

Paw Paw Township is a civil township of Van Buren County in the U.S. state of Michigan. The population was 6,881 at the 2020 census. The village of Paw Paw is located in the northeast portion of the township. The east south and south branches of the Paw Paw River flow through the township.

== Overview ==
Originally called Lafayette, Paw Paw Township was renamed in 1867. In addition to the usual 36 sections, the township contains about a section and a half at the northwest corner borrowed from Waverly Township. The township has several lakes as well as the Paw Paw River.

In 1833, Capt. E.L. Barrett settled on 160 acres of land near Paw Paw village. The same year, John Agard located on Section 1 and ran a trading post until he died in October 1835. In 1835, John Lyle and John K. Pugsley journeyed west on the Territorial Road to Chicago, returning to enter land in Section 2 of Paw Paw Township.

== Geography ==
According to the United States Census Bureau, the township has a total area of 37.0 square miles (96 km^{2}), of which 35.2 square miles (91 km^{2}) is land and 1.8 square miles (4.7 km^{2}) (4.86%) is water.

== Demographics ==
As of the census of 2000, there were 7,091 people, 2,771 households, and 1,898 families residing in the township. The population density was 201.4 inhabitants per square mile (77.8/km^{2}). There were 3,248 housing units at an average density of 92.2 per square mile (35.6/km^{2}). The racial makeup of the township was 93.60% White, 2.43% African American, 0.87% Native American, 0.27% Asian, 0.03% Pacific Islander, 0.94% from other races, and 1.86% from two or more races. Hispanic or Latino of any race were 3.47% of the population.

There were 2,771 households, out of which 32.7% had children under the age of 18 living with them, 52.6% were married couples living together, 12.0% had a female householder with no husband present, and 31.5% were non-families. 26.0% of all households were made up of individuals, and 9.6% had someone living alone who was 65 years of age or older. The average household size was 2.49 and the average family size was 2.98.

In the township the population was spread out, with 25.9% under the age of 18, 8.4% from 18 to 24, 27.9% from 25 to 44, 24.6% from 45 to 64, and 13.2% who were 65 years of age or older. The median age was 38 years. For every 100 females, there were 97.4 males. For every 100 females age 18 and over, there were 93.3 males.

The median income for a household in the township was $43,802, and the median income for a family was $53,722. Males had a median income of $38,171 versus $28,472 for females. The per capita income for the township was $20,549. About 4.3% of families and 7.0% of the population were below the poverty line, including 7.5% of those under age 18 and 6.2% of those age 65 or over.

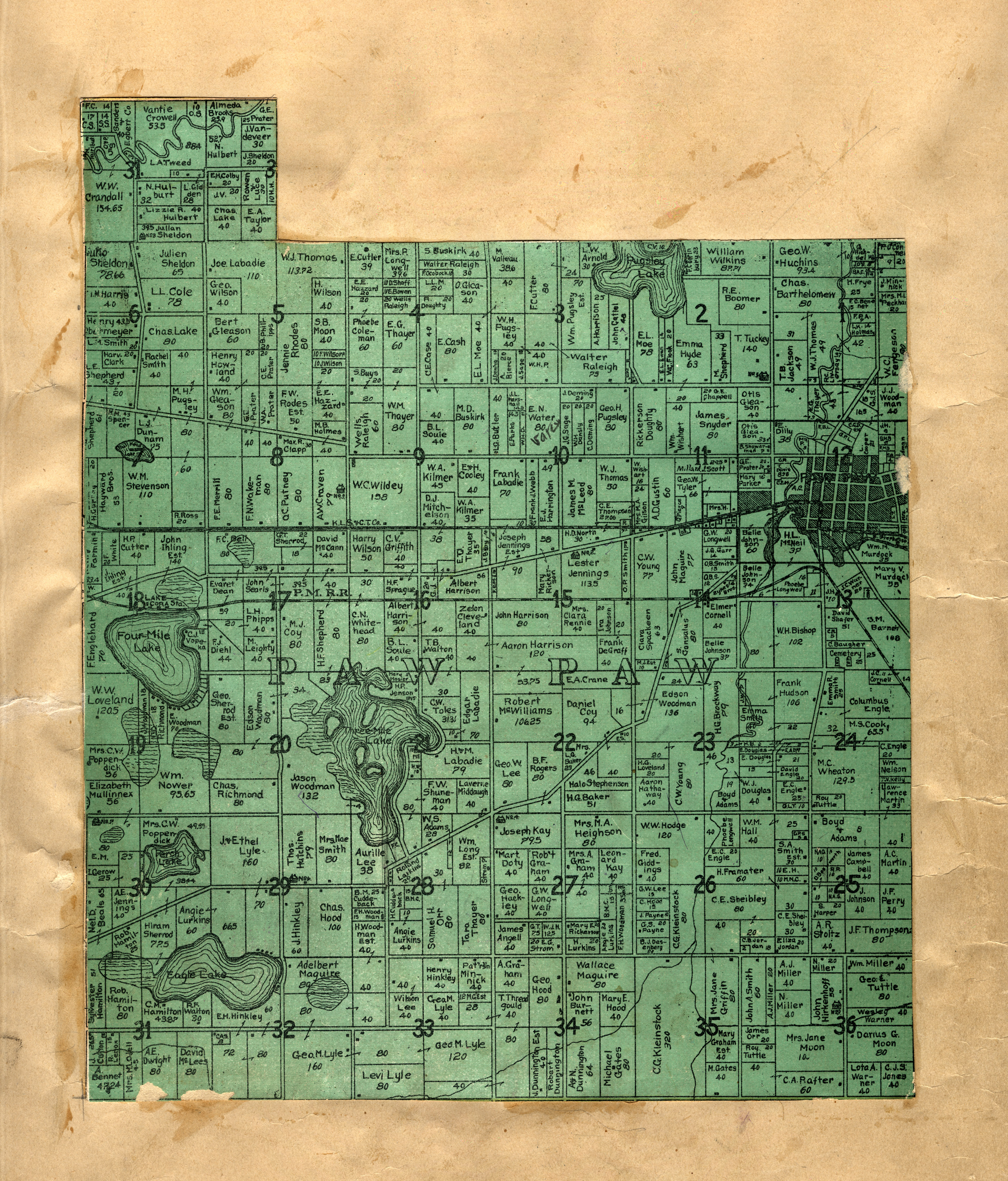
A 1906 cadastral map of Paw Paw Township, showing property lines and names of rural landowners

== Recycling ==
The township maintains a transfer station on West Red Arrow Hwy. Recycles accepted in a newsprint shed, cardboard bin, mixed plastic-glass-metal bin and larger metals bin.
