= John Baird (Michigan politician) =

American politician (1860–1934)

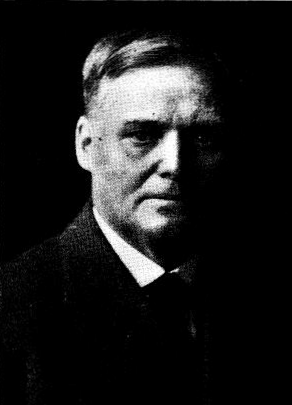
- Baird in a 1918 publication

Member of the Michigan Senate from the 22nd district
- In office 1901–1905

Member of the Michigan House of Representatives from the Saginaw County district
- In office 1895–1895

Personal details
- Born: February 11, 1860 Quebec City, Province of Canada
- Died: November 8, 1934 (aged 74) Saginaw, Michigan, U.S.
- Resting place: Mount Olivet Cemetery; Saginaw, Michigan, U.S.
- Party: Republican
- Spouse: Anna Greford
- Children: 4
- Occupation: Politician

John Baird (February 11, 1860 – November 8, 1934) was an American politician from Michigan. He was a Republican politician and served in the Michigan House of Representatives in 1895 and in the Michigan Senate from 1901 to 1905. He later was head of the Michigan Conservation Department (now Department of Natural Resources) from 1921 to 1927.

== Early life ==
John Baird was born on February 11, 1860, at the barracks in Quebec City, Province of Canada, to Bridget Joy and Robert Baird. His father was a British Army soldier and cabinet maker. Baird attended the district school in Seaforth, Ontario. His father died in 1875 and his mother relocated the family to Zilwaukee, Michigan.

== Career ==
After moving to Zilwaukee, Baird worked packing salt at the Whitney & Batchelor mill. After several years there, he moved to the salt works at the Saginaw Lumber & Salt Company at Crow Island, Michigan.

Baird was justice of the peace of Zilwaukee Township for several years. He was elected supervisor of Zilwaukee Township about 1890. He was a Republican. In 1895, he was elected to the Michigan House of Representatives, representing Saginaw County's second district; serving one term in 1895. In 1901, he was elected as a member of the Michigan Senate, representing the 22nd district; serving three consecutive terms in 1901, 1903 and 1905. He represented the 22nd district in the 1907–1908 Michigan constitutional convention. In 1910, he was the federal census director of the 18th congressional district. From January 30, 1911, to 1913, he served as Michigan's state salt inspector. Around 1913, he worked in the department of the deputy game warden and in 1915, he became state game warden.

In 1912, when the Republican state nominating convention was to meet in Bay City to nominate a candidate for President, Baird knew in advance there would be trouble between the delegates who wanted to nominate incumbent President William H. Taft and those who wanted Theodore Roosevelt. While communicating with an official over the phone about an issue, a switchboard operator left a phone line open, and Baird overheard a conversation between two men who were discussing the convention, and Baird's prediction proved true when the convention turned into a brawl between Taft and Roosevelt delegates.

In 1924, during the Michigan Presidential Primary, Baird had the name of a Hiram Johnson from Milwaukee placed on the ballot, which matched the name of Democratic Senator Hiram Johnson of California. John Baird, who believed presidential primaries were a waste of time and money, was trying to show how vulnerable the primary was to tampering, and the Hiram Johnson he put on the ballot turn out to have died months earlier.

In 1919, Baird helped organize the state of Michigan to bread pheasants when he set up a farm in Mason, Michigan. Governor Alex Groesbeck appointed Baird as the first director of the Michigan Conservation Department from 1921 to 1927. While director of the department, he helped organize the fish, game and forestry departments, park commission, board of geological survey, fish commission and public domain commission under the conservation department. He also served as chairman of the Saginaw County Board of Supervisors and chairman of the road commission. He was head of Michigan's fish, game and forestry department.

== Personal life ==
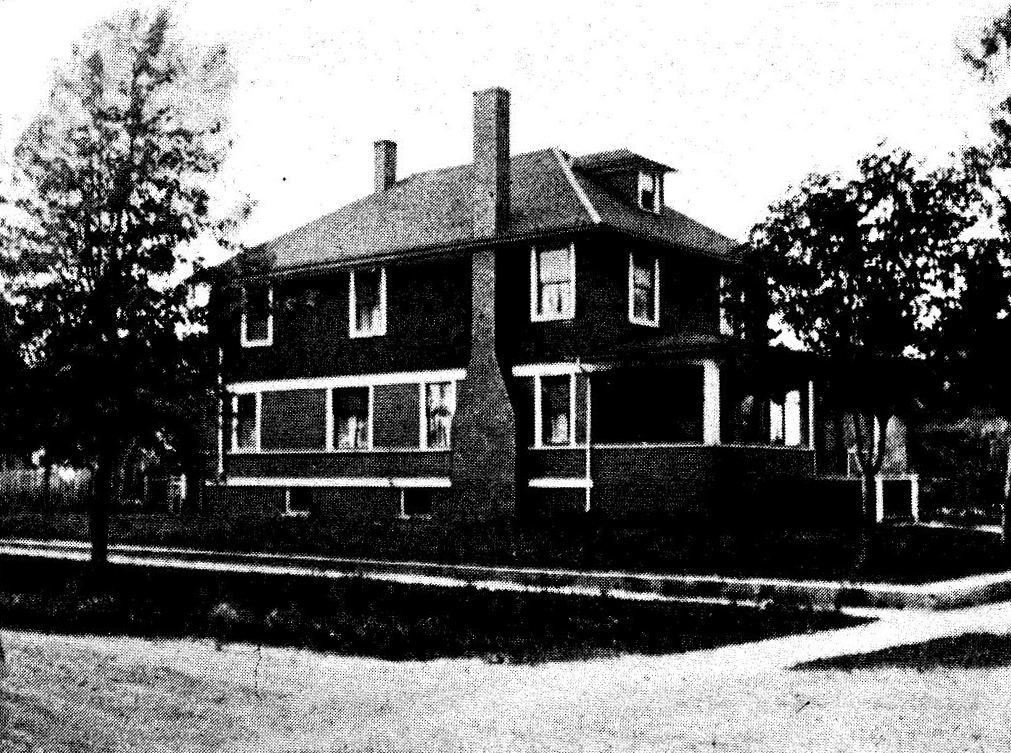
Residence of Baird in a 1918 publication

Around 1881, Baird married Anna Greford of Detroit. Baird had two sons and two daughters, Robert J., William E., Florence and Anna. He began living in Zilwaukee Township starting around 1881.

Baird died following heart trouble on November 8, 1934, aged 74, at St. Mary's Hospital in Saginaw. He was buried at Mount Olivet Cemetery in Saginaw.
