= Sarah Anthony =

American politician (born 1983)

Member of the Michigan Senate from the 21st district
- Incumbent
- Assumed office January 1, 2023
- Preceded by: Kim LaSata

Member of the Michigan House of Representatives from the 68th district
- In office November 2018 – December 31, 2022
- Preceded by: Andy Schor
- Succeeded by: David Martin

Personal details
- Born: December 2, 1983 (age 42) Lansing, Michigan, U.S.
- Party: Democratic
- Education: Central Michigan University (BA); Western Michigan University (MPA)
- Website: State Senate website Campaign website

Sarah Anthony (born December 2, 1983) is an American politician currently serving as a member of the Michigan Senate. A member of the Democratic Party, Anthony previously served in the Michigan House of Representatives.

== Early life and education ==
Anthony was born on December 2, 1983, in Lansing, Michigan. She is the daughter of two United Auto Workers retirees. Anthony earned a bachelor's degree in political science and legal studies from Central Michigan University and a Master of Public Administration from Western Michigan University.

== Early career ==
Upon graduation, Anthony returned to Lansing and served as a legislative assistant to Representative Joan Bauer. In 2010, she became the deputy director of Michigan College Access Network, holding the role for eight years. In 2012 she was elected to the Ingham County Board of Commissioners.

== State legislature ==
=== Michigan House of Representatives ===
Anthony was elected to serve the remainder of Andy Schor's term in November 2018.

Anthony served two terms representing Michigan's 68th House District, which encompassed the city of Lansing and Lansing Township prior to redistricting. While a state representative, she served as Vice Chair of the Progressive Women's Caucus and the First Vice Chair of the Michigan Legislative Black Caucus.

=== Michigan Senate ===
Anthony was elected to the Michigan Senate's 21st district in 2022. She is the Chair of the Senate Appropriations Committee.

In 2023, Anthony sponsored a CROWN Act in the Michigan Legislature. The CROWN Act aims to combat hair discrimination by prohibiting biases based on natural hair texture and protective hairstyles.

== Personal life ==
Anthony lives in Lansing. She has served as a member of the Capital Area Michigan Works! Administrative Board, Capital Area United Way Community Investment Committee, Greater Lansing Food Bank Board, Lansing Economic Area Partnership Board, and the Michigan League of Conservation Voters.
