= Marty Conrad =

American football player (1895–1942)

Profile
- Position: Offensive lineman

Personal information
- Born: November 30, 1895; Hartford, Michigan, U.S.
- Died: July 1, 1942 (aged 46)
- Listed height: 6 ft 1 in (1.85 m)
- Listed weight: 240 lb (109 kg)

Career information
- College: Kalamazoo

Career history
- Toledo Maroons (1922–1923); Kenosha Maroons (1924); Akron Pros (1925)
- Stats at Pro Football Reference

Martin Henry Conrad (November 30, 1895 – July 1, 1942) was a professional American football offensive lineman in the National Football League. He played for Kalamazoo College as a center in 1915 and won a letter in 1913-14 He played four seasons for the Toledo Maroons (1922–1923), the Kenosha Maroons (1924), and the Akron Pros (1925).
