= Geneva Township, Van Buren County, Michigan =

Geneva Township, Michigan
- Township
- Location within the state of Michigan
- Coordinates: 42°22′24″N 86°10′57″W
- Country: United States
- State: Michigan
- County: Van Buren

Area
  - Total: 35.3 sq mi (91.5 km^{2})
  - Land: 35.3 sq mi (91.5 km^{2})
  - Water: 0 sq mi (0.0 km^{2})
- Elevation: 630 ft (192 m)

Population (2020)
  - Total: 3,416
  - Density: 96.7/sq mi (37.3/km^{2})
- Time zone: Eastern
- FIPS code: 26-31840
- GNIS feature ID: 1626344

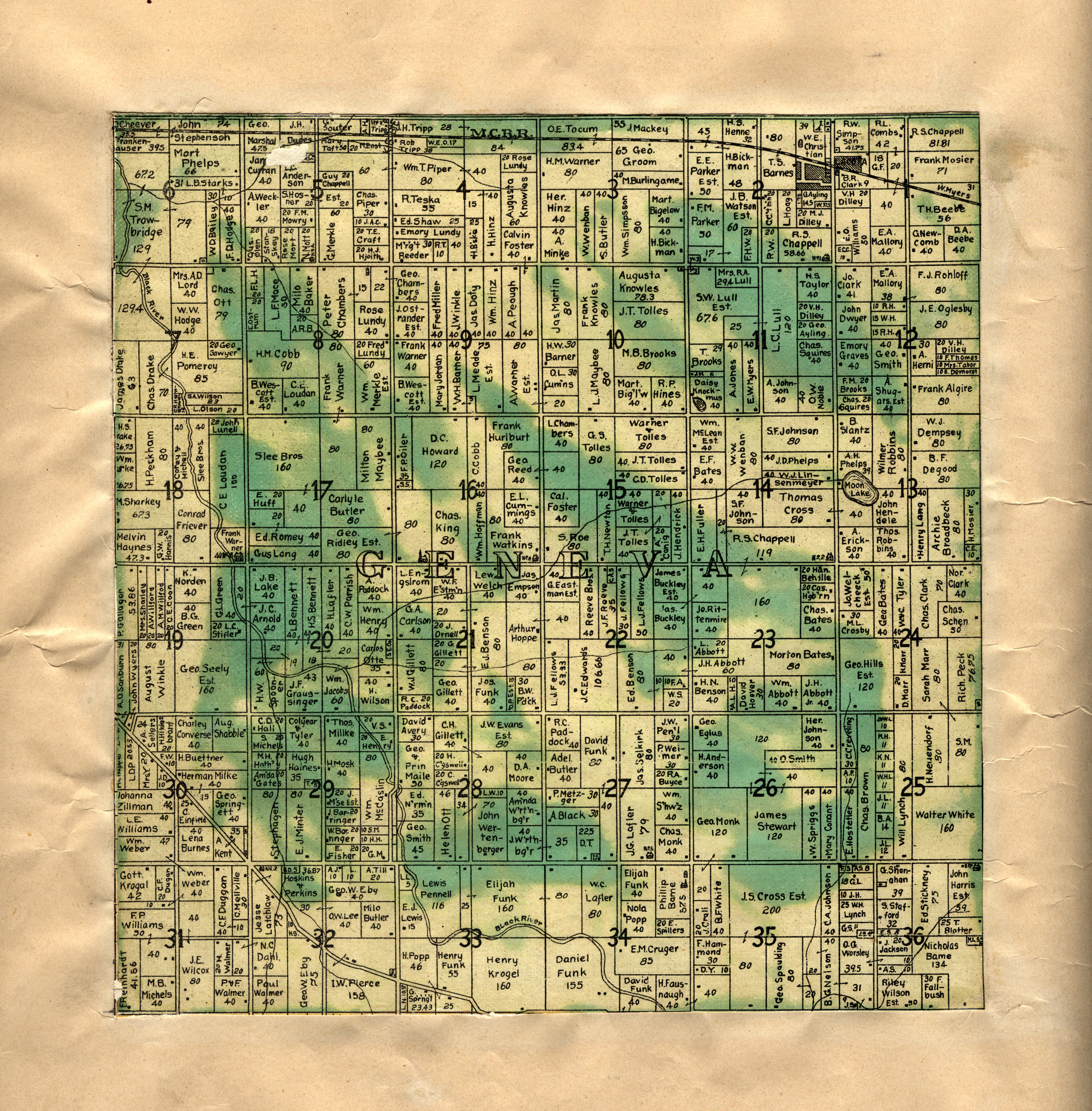
A 1906 cadastral map of Geneva Township, showing property lines and names of rural landowners

Geneva Township is a civil township of Van Buren County in the U.S. state of Michigan. The population was 3,416 at the 2020 United States census.

== Communities ==
- Lacota is an unincorporated community in the north of the township on 60th St. at 42°24′49″N 86°07′47″W. The community is near the northern boundary of the township and some residents in the adjacent Lee and Casco townships in Allegan County identify with Lacota. The Lacota post office, with ZIP code 49063, provides PO Box service. Clark Pierce became the first European settler in 1837. When the community was platted in 1870 by Enoch M. Pease, it was named Irvington after Pierce's son Irving. A post office named "West Geneva" opened on May 20, 1864, with Jerome B. Watson as the first postmaster. The post office name was changed to Irvington on June 2, 1874, and again to Lacota on December 22, 1884. The latter change was requested by the Michigan Central Railroad, which already served a town named Irving (in Irving Township, Barry County MI). The name Lacota was suggested by V. D. Dilley for the main character in a novel that his father was reading.

== Geography ==
According to the US Census Bureau, the township has a total area of 35.3 square miles (91 km^{2}), of which 35.3 square miles (91 km^{2}) is land and 0.04 square miles (0.10 km^{2}) (0.06%) is water.

== Demographics ==
As of the 2000 United States census, there were 3,975 people, 1,403 households, and 1,028 families in the township. The population density was 112.5 inhabitants per square mile (43.4/km^{2}). There were 1,567 housing units at an average density of 44.4 per square mile (17.1/km^{2}). The racial makeup of the township was 82.54% White, 9.18% African American, 1.38% Native American, 0.18% Asian, 4.33% from other races, and 2.39% from two or more races. Hispanic or Latino of any race were 7.92% of the population.

There were 1,403 households, out of which 37.0% had children under the age of 18 living with them, 56.1% were married couples living together, 11.9% had a female householder with no husband present, and 26.7% were non-families. 21.7% of all households were made up of individuals, and 7.8% had someone living alone who was 65 years of age or older. The average household size was 2.77 and the average family size was 3.20.

The township population contained 29.6% under the age of 18, 9.0% from 18 to 24, 28.2% from 25 to 44, 21.5% from 45 to 64, and 11.6% who were 65 years of age or older. The median age was 35 years. For every 100 females, there were 100.1 males. For every 100 females age 18 and over, there were 94.6 males.

The median income for a household in the township was $34,900, and the median income for a family was $38,125. Males had a median income of $35,712 versus $21,599 for females. The per capita income for the township was $16,499. About 7.9% of families and 10.4% of the population were below the poverty line, including 6.2% of those under age 18 and 17.9% of those age 65 or over.
