= Almena Township, Michigan =

- Township
- Location within the state of Michigan Almena Township, Michigan (the United States)
- Coordinates: 42°17′5″N 85°49′16″W
- Country: United States
- State: Michigan
- County: Van Buren

Area
  - Total: 34.8 sq mi (90.1 km^{2})
  - Land: 34.5 sq mi (89.3 km^{2})
  - Water: 0.31 sq mi (0.8 km^{2})
- Elevation: 728 ft (222 m)

Population (2020)
  - Total: 5,308
  - Density: 154/sq mi (59.4/km^{2})
- Time zone: UTC-5 (Eastern (EST))
  - Summer (DST): UTC-4 (EDT)
- FIPS code: 26-01600
- GNIS feature ID: 1625827
- Website: https://almenatownship.gov/

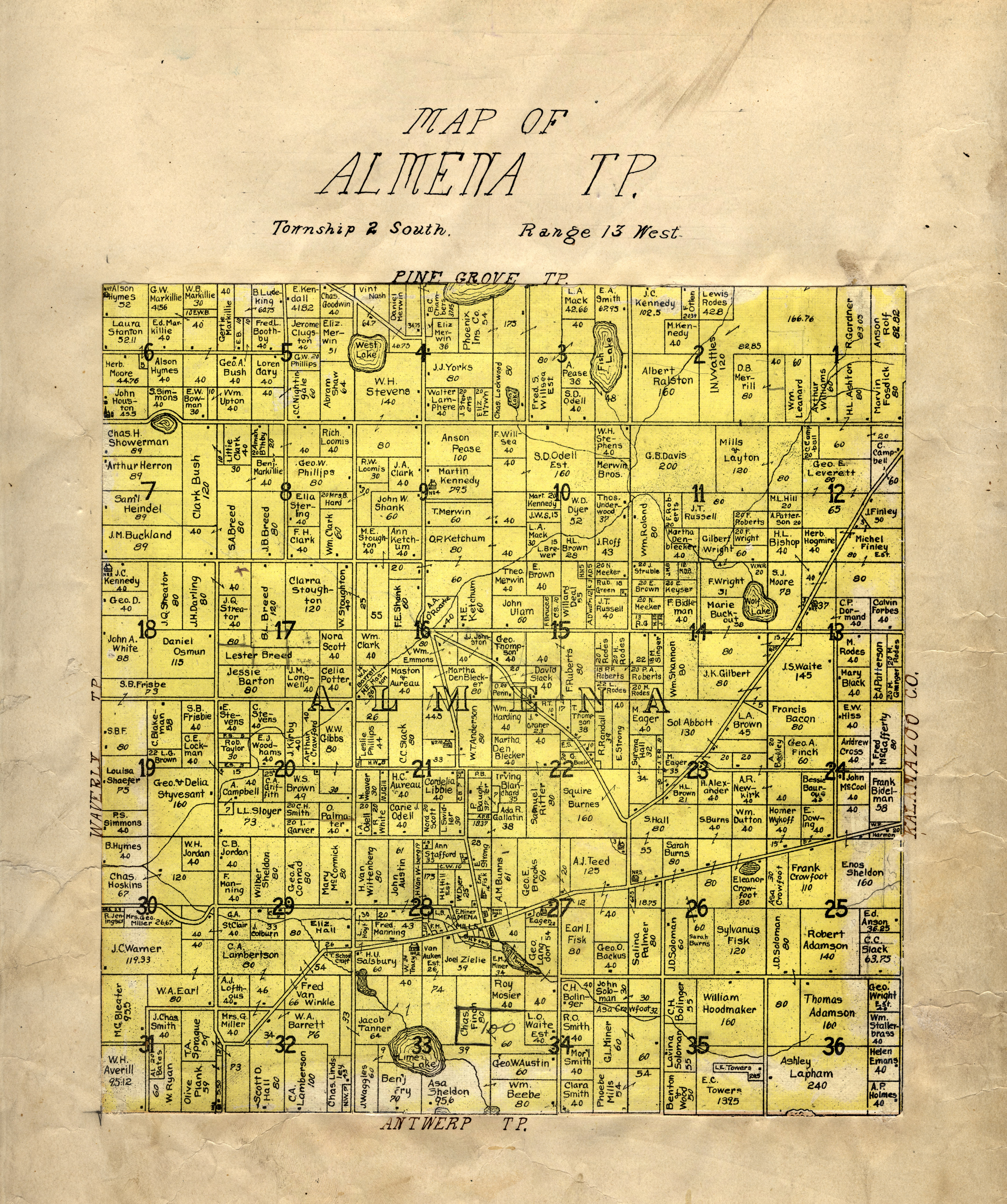
A 1906 cadastral map of Almena Township, showing property lines and names of rural landowners

Almena Township is a civil township of Van Buren County in the U.S. state of Michigan. As of the 2020 census, the township population was 5,308.

== History ==
The first permanent white settler in Almena Township was Jonas Barber, who settled there in 1835. The township was set off in 1842, reportedly named after a Potawatomi princess. Samuel Fisk operated a grist mill, from which the settlement became known as Almena Mills. A Free Will Baptist Church was established at Covey Hill near the edge of the township in 1843. A post office named Almena Centre operated from April 1848 until February 1849. In October 1861, the post office formerly in Brewerville (location unknown) was transferred to and renamed Almena, operating until September 1905.

== Geography ==
According to the United States Census Bureau, the township has a total area of 34.8 square miles (90 km^{2}), of which 34.5 square miles (89 km^{2}) is land and 0.3 square miles (0.78 km^{2}) (0.92%) is water.

== Demographics ==
As of the census of 2000, there were 4,226 people, 1,553 households, and 1,245 families residing in the township. The population density was 122.6 inhabitants per square mile (47.3/km^{2}). There were 1,633 housing units at an average density of 47.4 per square mile (18.3/km^{2}). The racial makeup of the township was 96.19% White, 1.23% African American, 0.78% Native American, 0.28% Asian, 0.07% Pacific Islander, 0.73% from other races, and 0.71% from two or more races. Hispanic or Latino of any race were 1.42% of the population.

There were 1,553 households, out of which 37.7% had children under the age of 18 living with them, 70.0% were married couples living together, 6.4% had a female householder with no husband present, and 19.8% were non-families. 15.5% of all households were made up of individuals, and 4.9% had someone living alone who was 65 years of age or older. The average household size was 2.72 and the average family size was 3.02.

In the township the population was spread out, with 26.9% under the age of 18, 5.8% from 18 to 24, 31.0% from 25 to 44, 27.5% from 45 to 64, and 8.8% who were 65 years of age or older. The median age was 38 years. For every 100 females, there were 104.7 males. For every 100 females age 18 and over, there were 102.0 males.

The median income for a household in the township was $51,027, and the median income for a family was $56,653. Males had a median income of $40,371 versus $28,896 for females. The per capita income for the township was $20,733. About 3.4% of families and 5.3% of the population were below the poverty line, including 7.9% of those under age 18 and 6.7% of those age 65 or over.
