= Van Buren Trail State Park =

State park in Van Buren County, Michigan

- Length: 14 miles (23 km)
- Location: Lower Peninsula, Van Buren County, Michigan
- Established: 1994
- Designation: Michigan state park
- Trailheads: South Haven (42°24′07″N 86°16′33″W); Hartford (42°12′41″N 86°10′16″W)
- Use: Biking, Hiking, horseback riding, snowmobiling, cross-country skiing
- Difficulty: Easy
- Season: All
- Sights: Farmland, blueberry fields, wooded areas.
- Surface: Dirt and gravel
- Maintainer: Michigan Department of Natural Resources
- Website: Van Buren Trail State Park

Van Buren Trail State Park, also known as Trail State Park, is an unimproved rail trail running along a former railroad right-of-way between Hartford, Michigan to South Haven, Michigan in Van Buren County. It is 14 miles (23 km) long and is used by hikers, mountain bikers and horse trail riders in the summer and snowmobilers in the winter. Terrain is flat with farmland and trees.

In 2004, Van Buren County took over operation of the state-owned trail after state budget problems. There was a trail pass system to pay for maintenance but that was resolved years ago and the trail is now free for Michigan residents with a Parks Passport.

In 2015, The Michigan Department of Natural Resources paved the 4.5-mile stretch which connects Van Buren State Park to the South Haven Trail system The pavement is a 10-foot-wide asphalt surface. South Haven maintains the marked route that connects to a downtown trailhead, city businesses, beaches and Kal-Haven Trail State Park.

In the fall of 2022 the Friends of the Kal-Haven Park installed directional and mile posts along the trail to better direct guests traveling from Hartford to South Haven via Covert.

Its northern terminus is South Haven near Lake Michigan. The Kal-Haven Trail starts in South Haven northeast of downtown. The trail pass is valid for both trails.
