= Arlington Township, Michigan =

- Township
- Location within the state of Michigan Arlington Township, Michigan (the United States)
- Coordinates: 42°17′52″N 86°2′33″W
- Country: United States
- State: Michigan
- County: Van Buren

Area
  - Total: 35.0 sq mi (90.6 km^{2})
  - Land: 34.5 sq mi (89.4 km^{2})
  - Water: 0.46 sq mi (1.2 km^{2})
- Elevation: 719 ft (219 m)

Population (2020)
  - Total: 1,958
  - Density: 56.7/sq mi (21.9/km^{2})
- Time zone: UTC-5 (Eastern (EST))
  - Summer (DST): UTC-4 (EDT)
- FIPS code: 26-03500
- GNIS feature ID: 1625849
- Website: Township website

Arlington Township is a civil township of Van Buren County in the U.S. state of Michigan. As of the 2020 census, the township population was 1,958. Arlington Township was established in 1842.

== Geography ==
According to the United States Census Bureau, the township has a total area of 35.0 square miles (91 km^{2}), of which 34.5 square miles (89 km^{2}) is land and 0.5 square miles (1.3 km^{2}) (1.34%) is water.

== Demographics ==
As of the census of 2000, there were 2,075 people, 736 households, and 565 families residing in the township. The population density was 60.1 inhabitants per square mile (23.2/km^{2}). There were 943 housing units at an average density of 27.3 per square mile (10.5/km^{2}). The racial makeup of the township was 89.98% White, 3.71% African American, 0.53% Native American, 4.14% from other races, and 1.64% from two or more races. Hispanic or Latino of any race were 7.23% of the population.

There were 736 households, out of which 36.5% had children under the age of 18 living with them, 62.4% were married couples living together, 9.4% had a female householder with no husband present, and 23.2% were non-families. 17.4% of all households were made up of individuals, and 8.4% had someone living alone who was 65 years of age or older. The average household size was 2.77 and the average family size was 3.11.

In the township the population was spread out, with 27.2% under the age of 18, 6.9% from 18 to 24, 28.0% from 25 to 44, 25.8% from 45 to 64, and 12.1% who were 65 years of age or older. The median age was 38 years. For every 100 females, there were 103.2 males. For every 100 females age 18 and over, there were 103.8 males.

The median income for a household in the township was $36,847, and the median income for a family was $38,300. Males had a median income of $31,528 versus $22,303 for females. The per capita income for the township was $16,349. About 7.8% of families and 11.2% of the population were below the poverty line, including 9.9% of those under age 18 and 9.1% of those age 65 or over.

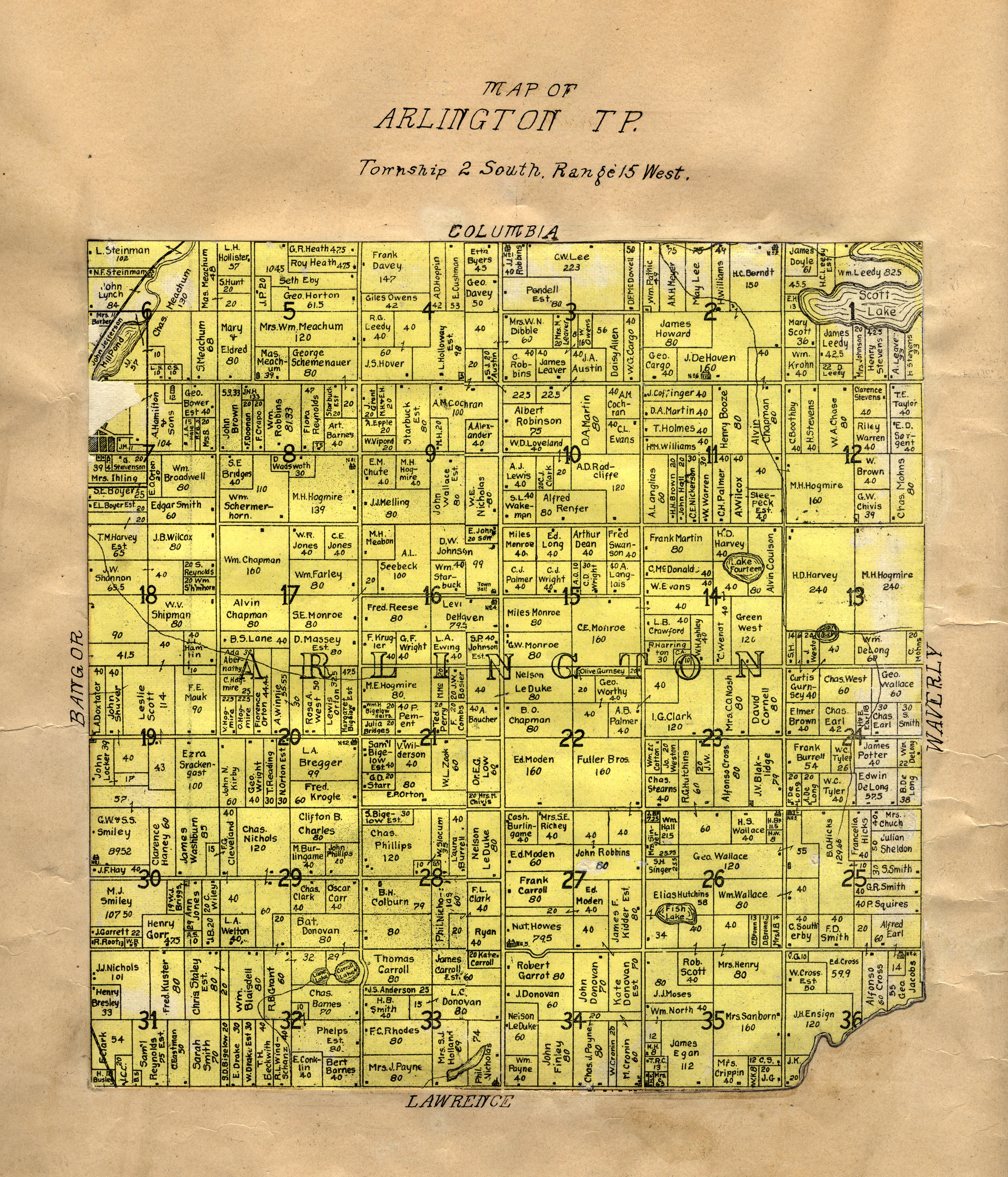
A 1906 cadastral map of Arlington Township, showing property lines and names of rural landowners
