= Isaac M. Cravath =

American politician (1826–1872)

Member of the Michigan Senate from the 21st district
- In office January 1, 1871 – May 4, 1872
- Preceded by: Stephen Pearl
- Succeeded by: John N. Mellen

Personal details
- Born: February 14, 1826 New York
- Died: May 4, 1872 (aged 46) Lansing, Michigan
- Party: Republican
- Other political affiliations: Free Soil

Isaac M. Cravath (February 14, 1826 – May 4, 1872) was a Michigan politician.

== Biography ==
Cravath was born in New York state. He later lived in Lima Township in Washtenaw County, Michigan. In 1855, he moved to Lansing to work as a clerk in the Michigan Auditor General's office. Cravah served as an editor for the Lansing Republican. Cravath fought with the 12th Michigan Infantry Regiment in the American Civil War at the Battle of Shiloh. He later resigned due to poor health.

Cravath was a Presbyterian. He was married to Mira E. Fiske, sister of Lewis R. Fiske.

In politics, Cravath was first a member of the Free Soil Party, and then a Republican. Cravath was sworn in as member of the Michigan Senate from the 21st district on January 4, 1871. On May 4, 1872, he died of kidney disease while in office.
