= Hartford, Michigan =

- City
- Seal

- Location of Hartford, Michigan
- Coordinates: 42°12′22″N 86°10′00″W
- Country: United States
- State: Michigan
- County: Van Buren

Area
  - Total: 1.36 sq mi (3.53 km^{2})
  - Land: 1.36 sq mi (3.52 km^{2})
  - Water: 0.0039 sq mi (0.01 km^{2})
- Elevation: 659 ft (201 m)

Population (2020)
  - Total: 2,515
  - Density: 1,850.6/sq mi (714.53/km^{2})
- Time zone: UTC-5 (Eastern (EST))
  - Summer (DST): UTC-4 (EDT)
- ZIP code: 49057
- Area code: 269
- FIPS code: 26-36960
- GNIS feature ID: 0627881
- Website: https://www.cityofhartfordmi.org/

Hartford is a city in Van Buren County in the U.S. state of Michigan. As of the 2020 census, Hartford had a population of 2,515. The city is located within Hartford Township, but is politically independent.

== Geography ==
According to the United States Census Bureau, the city has a total area of 1.34 square miles (3.47 km^{2}), of which 1.33 square miles (3.44 km^{2}) is land and 0.01 square miles (0.03 km^{2}) is water.

== Demographics ==
Historical population
| Census | Pop. | Note | %± |
|---|---|---|---|
| 1880 | 838 | | — |
| 1890 | 1,044 | | 24.6% |
| 1900 | 1,077 | | 3.2% |
| 1910 | 1,268 | | 17.7% |
| 1920 | 1,361 | | 7.3% |
| 1930 | 1,484 | | 9.0% |
| 1940 | 1,694 | | 14.2% |
| 1950 | 1,838 | | 8.5% |
| 1960 | 2,305 | | 25.4% |
| 1970 | 2,508 | | 8.8% |
| 1980 | 2,493 | | −0.6% |
| 1990 | 2,341 | | −6.1% |
| 2000 | 2,476 | | 5.8% |
| 2010 | 2,688 | | 8.6% |
| 2020 | 2,515 | | −6.4% |
U.S. Decennial Census

=== 2020 census ===
As of the 2020 census, Hartford had a population of 2,515. The median age was 32.8 years. 29.6% of residents were under the age of 18 and 13.4% of residents were 65 years of age or older. For every 100 females there were 97.4 males, and for every 100 females age 18 and over there were 94.8 males age 18 and over.

0.0% of residents lived in urban areas, while 100.0% lived in rural areas.

There were 869 households in Hartford, of which 37.7% had children under the age of 18 living in them. Of all households, 41.4% were married-couple households, 19.2% were households with a male householder and no spouse or partner present, and 30.0% were households with a female householder and no spouse or partner present. About 28.0% of all households were made up of individuals and 13.6% had someone living alone who was 65 years of age or older.

There were 971 housing units, of which 10.5% were vacant. The homeowner vacancy rate was 3.6% and the rental vacancy rate was 9.0%.

Racial composition as of the 2020 census
| Race | Number | Percent |
|---|---|---|
| White | 1,583 | 62.9% |
| Black or African American | 45 | 1.8% |
| American Indian and Alaska Native | 97 | 3.9% |
| Asian | 6 | 0.2% |
| Native Hawaiian and Other Pacific Islander | 2 | 0.1% |
| Some other race | 465 | 18.5% |
| Two or more races | 317 | 12.6% |
| Hispanic or Latino (of any race) | 852 | 33.9% |

=== 2010 census ===
As of the census of 2010, there were 2,688 people, 899 households, and 644 families living in the city. The population density was 2,021.1 inhabitants per square mile (780.4/km^{2}). There were 1,002 housing units at an average density of 753.4 per square mile (290.9/km^{2}). The racial makeup of the city was 71.9% White, 1.6% African American, 2.8% Native American, 0.5% Asian, 18.7% from other races, and 4.5% from two or more races. Hispanic or Latino of any race were 29.5% of the population.

There were 899 households, of which 45.3% had children under the age of 18 living with them, 46.4% were married couples living together, 17.2% had a female householder with no husband present, 8.0% had a male householder with no wife present, and 28.4% were non-families. 23.1% of all households were made up of individuals, and 9.2% had someone living alone who was 65 years of age or older. The average household size was 2.97 and the average family size was 3.50.

The median age in the city was 31.3 years. 32% of residents were under the age of 18; 9.2% were between the ages of 18 and 24; 26.4% were from 25 to 44; 22.4% were from 45 to 64; and 10% were 65 years of age or older. The gender makeup of the city was 49.2% male and 50.8% female.

=== 2000 census ===
As of the census of 2000, there were 2,476 people, 935 households, and 646 families living in the city. The population density was 1,805.6 inhabitants per square mile (697.1/km^{2}). There were 1,023 housing units at an average density of 746.0 per square mile (288.0/km^{2}). The racial makeup of the city was 85.42% White, 0.89% African American, 3.31% Native American, 0.24% Asian, 7.19% from other races, and 2.95% from two or more races. Hispanic or Latino of any race were 12.72% of the population.

There were 935 households, out of which 35.4% had children under the age of 18 living with them, 47.7% were married couples living together, 15.6% had a female householder with no husband present, and 30.9% were non-families. 27.3% of all households were made up of individuals, and 10.9% had someone living alone who was 65 years of age or older. The average household size was 2.64 and the average family size was 3.16.

In the city, the population was spread out, with 29.1% under the age of 18, 10.0% from 18 to 24, 29.6% from 25 to 44, 20.2% from 45 to 64, and 11.2% who were 65 years of age or older. The median age was 33 years. For every 100 females, there were 93.4 males. For every 100 females age 18 and over, there were 90.1 males.

The median income for a household in the city was $32,879, and the median income for a family was $36,632. Males had a median income of $30,313 versus $21,481 for females. The per capita income for the city was $14,181. About 13.9% of families and 16.1% of the population were below the poverty line, including 19.5% of those under age 18 and 20.8% of those age 65 or over.

== Recreation ==
Within the city limits of Hartford is one of the endpoints of the Van Buren Trail.

Hartford Motor Speedway is a venue for motor racing through the spring, summer and fall. Hartford Motor Speedway hosts 3/8 mile dirt track racing and special events like Monster Truck Throwdown, World of Outlaws, and Night of Destruction.

Hartford hosts the annual Strawberry Festival in early June.

== Education ==
Public education is provided by the Hartford Public Schools.

== Notable people ==
- Marty Conrad, offensive lineman in the NFL for the Toledo Maroons (1922–1923), the Kenosha Maroons (1924), and the Akron Pros (1925).
- Edward D. Kelly, third Bishop of Grand Rapids from 1919 until his death in 1926.
