= Hamilton Township, Van Buren County, Michigan =

Hamilton Township, Michigan
- Township
- Location within the state of Michigan Hamilton Township, Michigan (the United States)
- Coordinates: 42°6′20″N 86°3′7″W
- Country: United States
- State: Michigan
- County: Van Buren

Area
  - Total: 35.6 sq mi (92.2 km^{2})
  - Land: 34.5 sq mi (89.3 km^{2})
  - Water: 1.1 sq mi (2.9 km^{2})
- Elevation: 771 ft (235 m)

Population (2020)
  - Total: 1,370
  - Density: 39.7/sq mi (15.3/km^{2})
- Time zone: UTC-5 (Eastern (EST))
  - Summer (DST): UTC-4 (EDT)
- FIPS code: 26-36180
- GNIS feature ID: 1626423
- Website: https://hamiltontownshipmi.org/

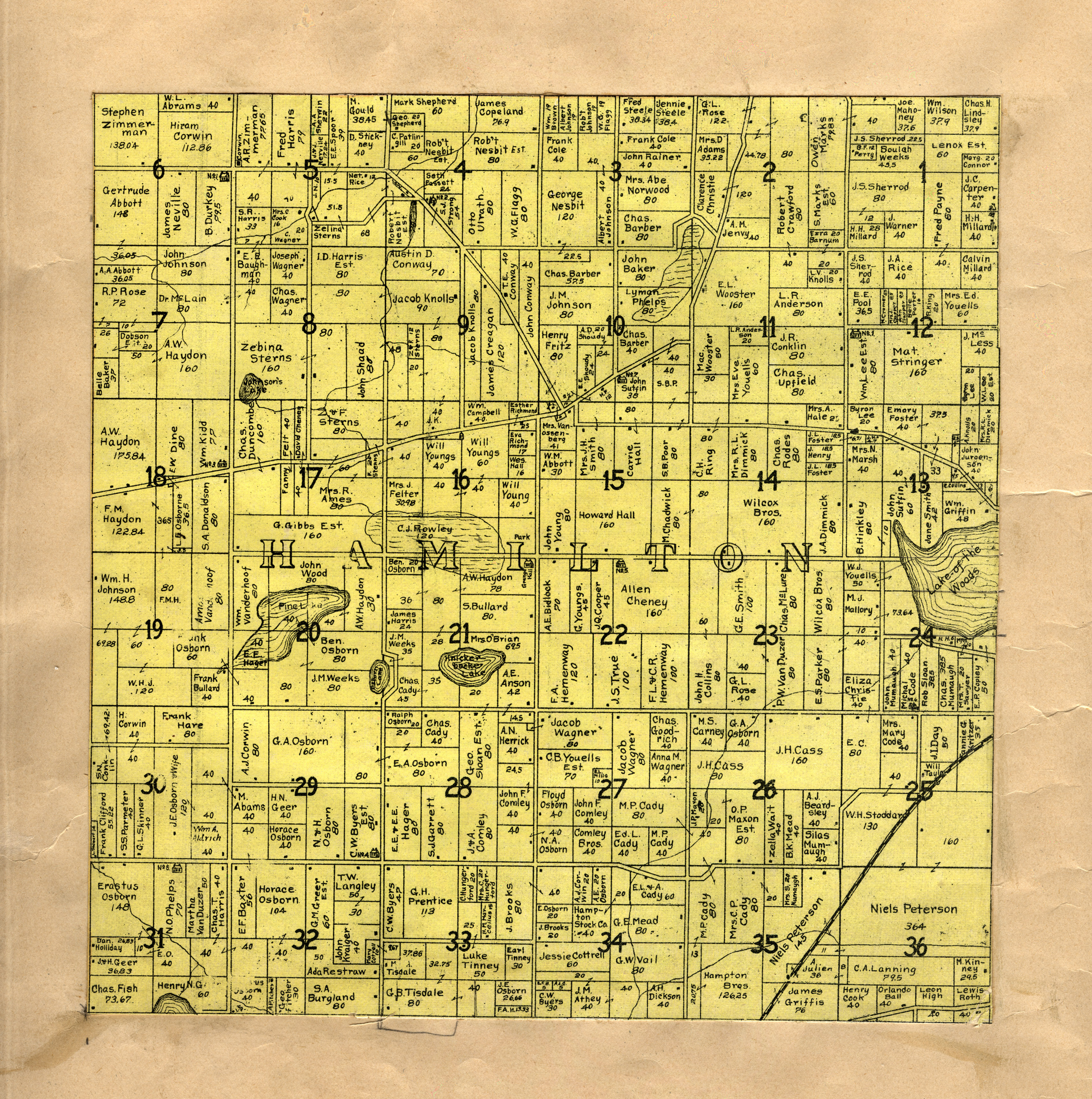
A 1906 cadastral map of Hamilton Township, showing property lines and names of landowners

Hamilton Township is a civil township of Van Buren County in the U.S. state of Michigan. As of the 2020 census, the township population was 1,370.

The township is mostly agricultural with no towns. There are some private campgrounds and cottages at Lake-of-the-Woods.

Hamilton Township was organized in 1839.

== Geography ==
According to the United States Census Bureau, the township has a total area of 35.6 square miles (92 km^{2}), of which 34.5 square miles (89 km^{2}) is land and 1.1 square miles (2.8 km^{2}) (3.17%) is water.

== Demographics ==
As of the census of 2000, there were 1,797 people, 568 households, and 423 families residing in the township. The population density was 52.1 inhabitants per square mile (20.1/km^{2}). There were 723 housing units at an average density of 21.0 per square mile (8.1/km^{2}). The racial makeup of the township was 88.70% White, 1.84% African American, 1.28% Native American, 0.06% Asian, 5.73% from other races, and 2.39% from two or more races. Hispanic or Latino of any race were 20.59% of the population.

There were 568 households, out of which 33.1% had children under the age of 18 living with them, 60.6% were married couples living together, 8.3% had a female householder with no husband present, and 25.4% were non-families. 19.9% of all households were made up of individuals, and 9.0% had someone living alone who was 65 years of age or older. The average household size was 2.76 and the average family size was 3.17.

In the township the population was spread out, with 30.3% under the age of 18, 10.9% from 18 to 24, 26.1% from 25 to 44, 21.0% from 45 to 64, and 11.7% who were 65 years of age or older. The median age was 32 years. For every 100 females, there were 112.7 males. For every 100 females age 18 and over, there were 105.4 males.

The median income for a household in the township was $37,434, and the median income for a family was $41,875. Males had a median income of $36,438 versus $25,125 for females. The per capita income for the township was $16,169. About 8.0% of families and 13.5% of the population were below the poverty line, including 13.8% of those under age 18 and 6.8% of those age 65 or over.
