= Porter Township, Van Buren County, Michigan =

Porter Township, Michigan
- Township
- Location within the state of Michigan Porter Township, Michigan (the United States)
- Coordinates: 42°6′13″N 85°49′53″W
- Country: United States
- State: Michigan
- County: Van Buren

Area
  - Total: 35.4 sq mi (91.6 km^{2})
  - Land: 33.3 sq mi (86.2 km^{2})
  - Water: 2.1 sq mi (5.4 km^{2})
- Elevation: 928 ft (283 m)

Population (2020)
  - Total: 2,568
  - Density: 77.2/sq mi (29.8/km^{2})
- Time zone: UTC-5 (Eastern (EST))
  - Summer (DST): UTC-4 (EDT)
- FIPS code: 26-65760
- GNIS feature ID: 1626931
- Website: https://portertwpvbco.gov/

Porter Township is a civil township of Van Buren County in the U.S. state of Michigan. The population was 2,568 at the 2020 census.

== Geography ==
According to the United States Census Bureau, the township has a total area of 35.4 square miles (91.6 km^{2}), of which 33.3 square miles (86.2 km^{2}) is land and 2.1 square miles (5.4 km^{2}) (5.88%) is water.

== Demographics ==
As of the census of 2000, there were 2,406 people, 935 households, and 694 families residing in the township. The population density was 72.3 inhabitants per square mile (27.9/km^{2}). There were 1,380 housing units at an average density of 41.4 per square mile (16.0/km^{2}). The racial makeup of the township was 96.09% White, 0.58% African American, 0.25% Native American, 0.21% Asian, 2.16% from other races, and 0.71% from two or more races. Hispanic or Latino of any race were 3.87% of the population.

There were 935 households, out of which 32.3% had children under the age of 18 living with them, 64.0% were married couples living together, 5.9% had a female householder with no husband present, and 25.7% were non-families. 21.1% of all households were made up of individuals, and 7.2% had someone living alone who was 65 years of age or older. The average household size was 2.57 and the average family size was 2.99.

In the township the population was spread out, with 24.4% under the age of 18, 6.3% from 18 to 24, 28.1% from 25 to 44, 27.4% from 45 to 64, and 13.7% who were 65 years of age or older. The median age was 41 years. For every 100 females, there were 103.2 males. For every 100 females age 18 and over, there were 100.9 males.

The median income for a household in the township was $48,491, and the median income for a family was $55,050. Males had a median income of $41,779 versus $27,017 for females. The per capita income for the township was $23,104. About 3.2% of families and 5.5% of the population were below the poverty line, including 6.9% of those under age 18 and 5.4% of those age 65 or over.

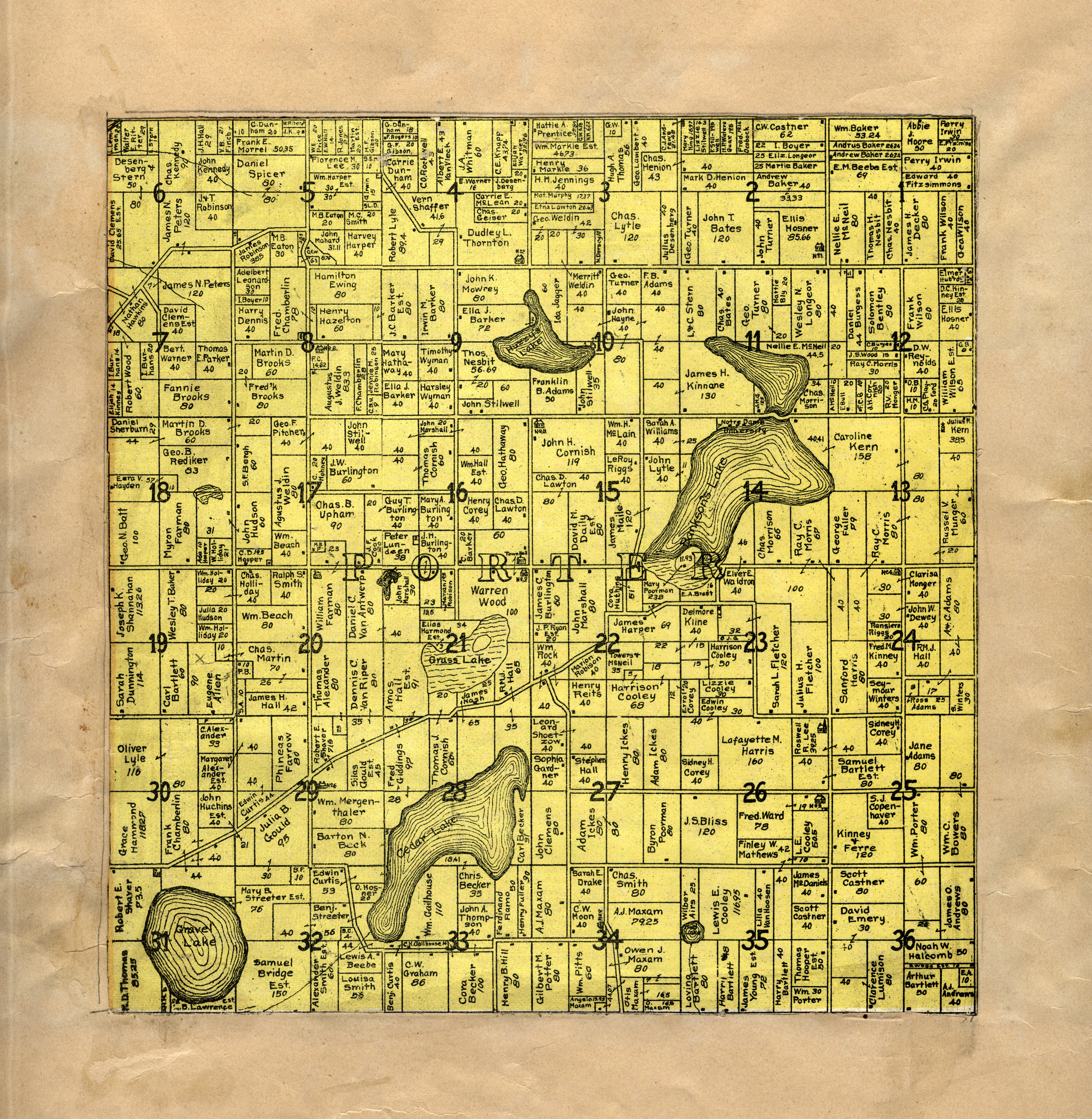
A 1906 cadastral map of Porter Township, showing property lines and names of rural landowners
