= Covert Township, Michigan =

- Township
- Location within the state of Michigan Covert Township, Michigan (the United States)
- Coordinates: 42°17′55″N 86°17′18″W
- Country: United States
- State: Michigan
- County: Van Buren

Area
  - Total: 35.0 sq mi (90.6 km^{2})
  - Land: 35.0 sq mi (90.6 km^{2})
  - Water: 0 sq mi (0.0 km^{2})
- Elevation: 646 ft (197 m)

Population (2020)
  - Total: 2,510
  - Density: 71.8/sq mi (27.7/km^{2})
- Time zone: Eastern
- ZIP code: 49043
- Area code: 269
- FIPS code: 26-18560
- GNIS feature ID: 1626138
- Website: Township website

Covert Township is a civil township of Van Buren County in the U.S. state of Michigan. As of the 2020 United States census, the population was 2,510.

== Geography ==
According to the US Census Bureau, the township has a total area of 35.0 square miles (91 km^{2}), all land.

== History ==
This township, originally forming part of the old township of Lafayette, was included within the boundaries of South Haven by an act of the State Legislature erecting the latter township, bearing date March 11, 1837. It continued as South Haven until Oct. 8, 1855, when, by the action of the Board of Supervisors of Van Buren County, surveyed township No. 2 south, of range No. 17 west, was organized as Deerfield. Its name was changed to Covert by the State Legislative body, then in session, March 29, 1877.

Covert, Michigan was a place of racial integration from its founding in the 1860s. The school had both black and white students starting in the 1860s. Blacks were elected to numerous positions from 1868 on. The Covert cemetery is the final resting place of both black and white Civil War veterans.

== Demographics ==
As of the 2000 United States census, there were 3,141 people, 1,118 households, and 763 families in the township. The population density was 89.8 inhabitants per square mile (34.7/km^{2}). There were 1,683 housing units at an average density of 48.1 per square mile (18.6/km^{2}). The racial makeup of the township was 51.10% White, 35.24% African American, 1.02% Native American, 0.13% Asian, 7.99% from other races, and 4.52% from two or more races. Hispanic or Latino of any race were 15.22% of the population.

There were 1,118 households, out of which 33.2% had children under the age of 18 living with them, 47.2% were married couples living together, 16.0% had a female householder with no husband present, and 31.7% were non-families. 27.0% of all households were made up of individuals, and 11.1% had someone living alone who was 65 years of age or older. The average household size was 2.78 and the average family size was 3.39.

The township population contained 31.8% under the age of 18, 7.4% from 18 to 24, 25.7% from 25 to 44, 22.4% from 45 to 64, and 12.7% who were 65 years of age or older. The median age was 35 years. For every 100 females, there were 101.0 males. For every 100 females age 18 and over, there were 98.1 males.

The median income for a household in the township was $22,829, and the median income for a family was $28,586. Males had a median income of $28,929 versus $21,607 for females. The per capita income for the township was $12,156. About 26.1% of families and 32.4% of the population were below the poverty line, including 44.6% of those under age 18 and 24.4% of those age 65 or over.

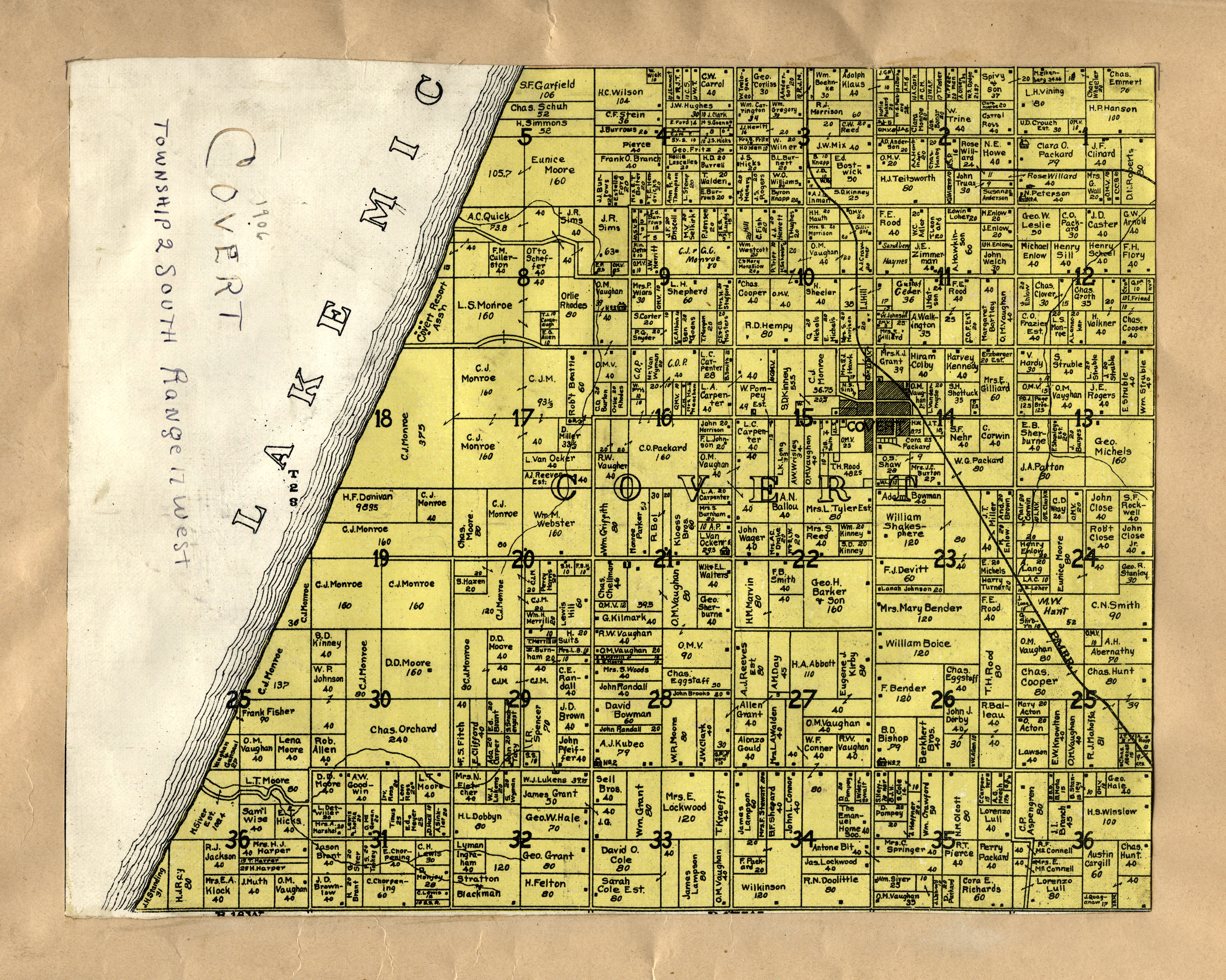
A 1906 cadastral map of Covert Township, showing property lines and names of rural landowners
