= Waverly Township, Van Buren County, Michigan =

Waverly Township, Michigan
- Township
- Location within the state of Michigan Waverly Township, Michigan (the United States)
- Coordinates: 42°16′42″N 85°55′29″W
- Country: United States
- State: Michigan
- County: Van Buren

Area
  - Total: 34.4 sq mi (89.1 km^{2})
  - Land: 34.1 sq mi (88.4 km^{2})
  - Water: 0.23 sq mi (0.6 km^{2})
- Elevation: 686 ft (209 m)

Population (2020)
  - Total: 2,506
  - Density: 73.4/sq mi (28.3/km^{2})
- Time zone: UTC-5 (Eastern (EST))
  - Summer (DST): UTC-4 (EDT)
- FIPS code: 26-84820
- GNIS feature ID: 1627229
- Website: https://waverlytownship-vbcmi.gov/

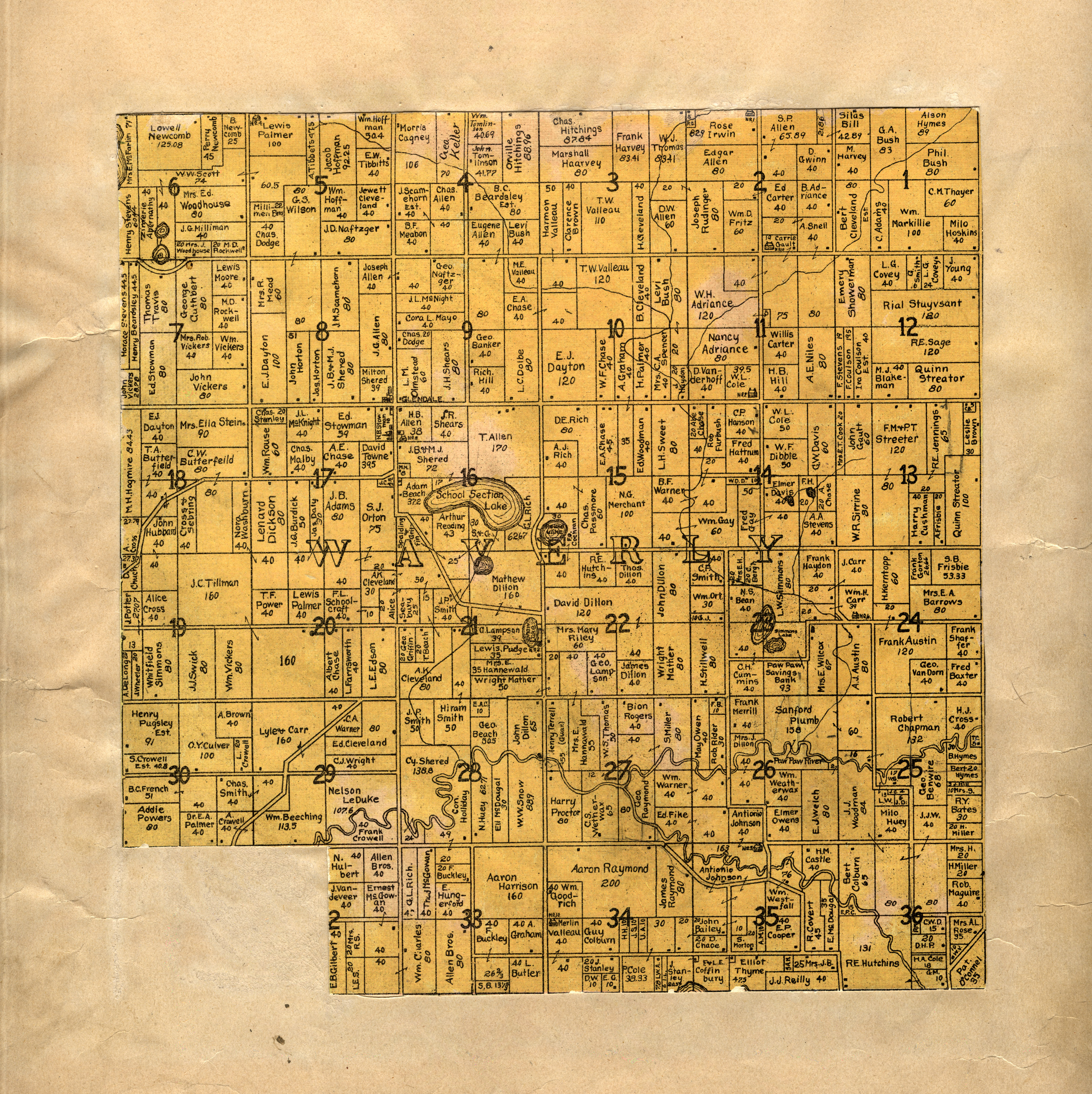
A 1906 cadastral map of Waverly Township, showing property lines and names of landowners

Waverly Township is a civil township of Van Buren County in the U.S. state of Michigan. The population was 2,506 at the 2020 census. Waverly Township was established in 1842.

== Geography ==
According to the United States Census Bureau, the township has a total area of 34.4 square miles (89.1 km^{2}), of which 34.1 square miles (88.4 km^{2}) is land and 0.2 square miles (0.6 km^{2}) (0.73%) is water.

== Community ==
- Glendale was a community in the Township located at the four corners of Sections 8, 9, 16, and 17, north of School Section Lake. It was named "Lemont" when founded in 1868. However, because too often it was confused with Lamont, Tallmadge Township, Ottawa County, Michigan, it quickly was renamed in November of that year. It had a US post office, which continued until 1904.

== Demographics ==
At the 2000 census, there were 2,467 people, 912 households and 691 families residing in the township. The population density was 72.3 inhabitants per square mile (27.9/km^{2}). There were 991 housing units at an average density of 29.0 per square mile (11.2/km^{2}). The racial makeup of the township was 94.81% White, 1.46% African American, 0.69% Native American, 0.20% Asian, 1.18% from other races, and 1.66% from two or more races. Hispanic or Latino of any race were 2.27% of the population.

There were 912 households, of which 35.3% had children under the age of 18 living with them, 64.5% were married couples living together, 6.9% had a female householder with no husband present, and 24.2% were non-families. 18.4% of all households were made up of individuals, and 6.1% had someone living alone who was 65 years of age or older. The average household size was 2.70 and the average family size was 3.07.

27.6% of the population were under the age of 18, 7.3% from 18 to 24, 31.5% from 25 to 44, 24.2% from 45 to 64, and 9.4% who were 65 years of age or older. The median age was 36 years. For every 100 females, there were 99.4 males. For every 100 females age 18 and over, there were 98.3 males.

The median household income was $51,100 and the median family income was $53,567. Males had a median income of $37,829 compared with $26,382 for females. The per capita income for the township was $18,443. About 5.4% of families and 9.0% of the population were below the poverty line, including 9.9% of those under age 18 and 10.8% of those age 65 or over.
