= Lawrence Township, Michigan =

- Township
- Location within the state of Michigan Lawrence Township, Michigan (the United States)
- Coordinates: 42°12′31″N 86°2′46″W
- Country: United States
- State: Michigan
- County: Van Buren

Area
  - Total: 35.9 sq mi (92.9 km^{2})
  - Land: 35.0 sq mi (90.7 km^{2})
  - Water: 0.85 sq mi (2.2 km^{2})
- Elevation: 758 ft (231 m)

Population (2020)
  - Total: 3,289
  - Density: 93.9/sq mi (36.3/km^{2})
- Time zone: UTC-5 (Eastern (EST))
  - Summer (DST): UTC-4 (EDT)
- ZIP code: 49064
- Area code: 269
- FIPS code: 26-46460
- GNIS feature ID: 1626595
- Website: https://www.lawrence-township.org/

Lawrence Township is a civil township of Van Buren County in the U.S. state of Michigan. The population was 3,289 at the 2020 census. The Village of Lawrence is located within the township.

== Geography ==
According to the United States Census Bureau, the township has a total area of 35.9 square miles (93 km^{2}), of which 35.0 square miles (91 km^{2}) is land and 0.9 square miles (2.3 km^{2}) (2.43%) is water.

== Demographics ==
As of the census of 2000, there were 3,341 people, 1,194 households, and 893 families residing in the township. The population density was 95.4 inhabitants per square mile (36.8/km^{2}). There were 1,516 housing units at an average density of 43.3 per square mile (16.7/km^{2}). The racial makeup of the township was 84.47% White, 2.93% African American, 1.08% Native American, 0.36% Asian, 7.09% from other races, and 4.07% from two or more races. Hispanic or Latino of any race were 13.41% of the population.

There were 1,194 households, out of which 35.3% had children under the age of 18 living with them, 58.7% were married couples living together, 11.1% had a female householder with no husband present, and 25.2% were non-families. 20.4% of all households were made up of individuals, and 9.1% had someone living alone who was 65 years of age or older. The average household size was 2.74 and the average family size was 3.16.

In the township the population was spread out, with 29.0% under the age of 18, 7.7% from 18 to 24, 27.1% from 25 to 44, 24.0% from 45 to 64, and 12.2% who were 65 years of age or older. The median age was 36 years. For every 100 females, there were 95.8 males. For every 100 females age 18 and over, there were 94.2 males.

The median income for a household in the township was $36,944, and the median income for a family was $45,781. Males had a median income of $30,964 versus $24,779 for females. The per capita income for the township was $16,246. About 7.1% of families and 12.8% of the population were below the poverty line, including 15.2% of those under age 18 and 10.4% of those age 65 or over.

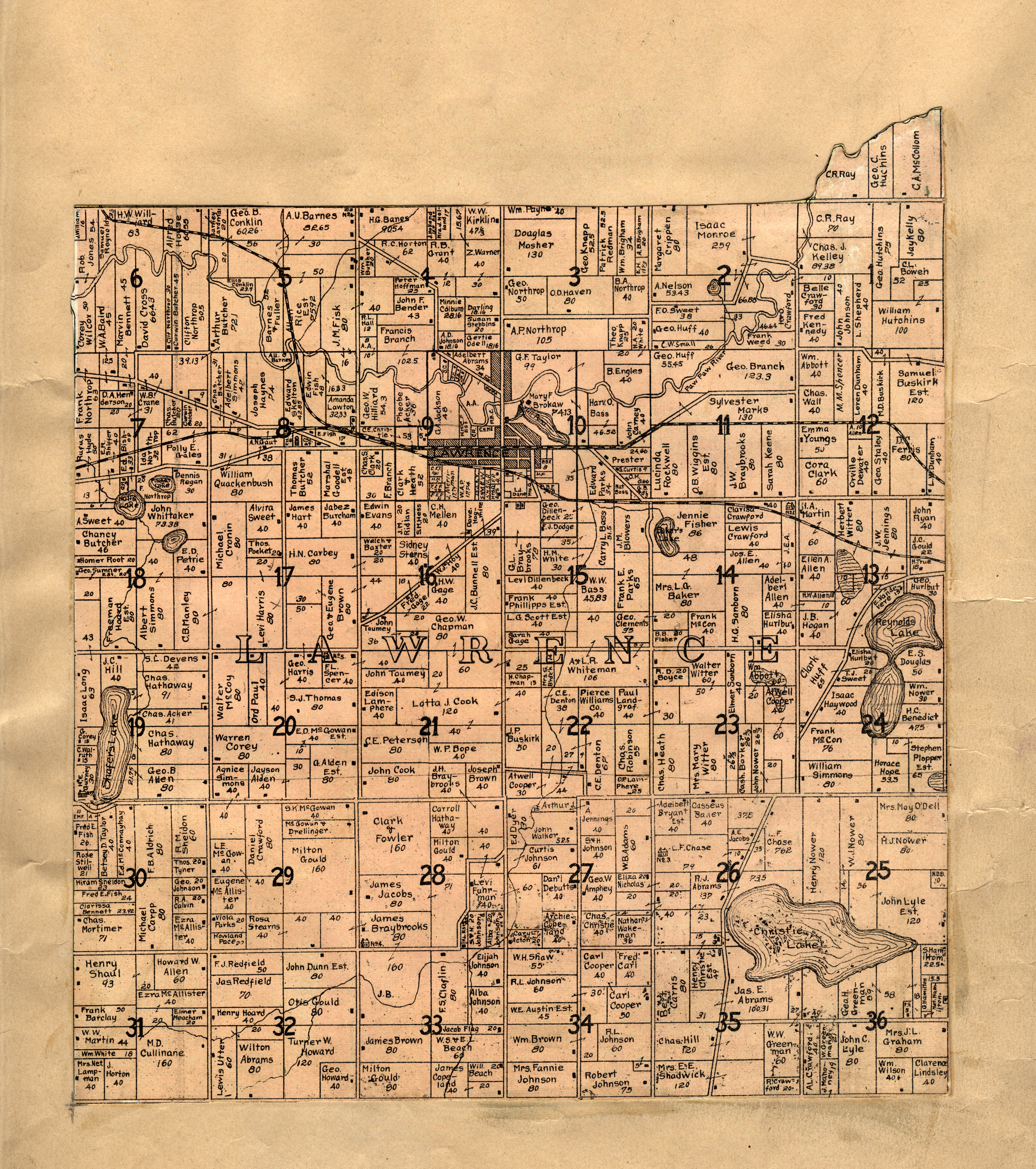
A 1906 cadastral map of Lawrence Township, showing property lines and names of rural landowners
