= Hartford Township, Michigan =

- Township
- Location within the state of Michigan Hartford Township, Michigan (the United States)
- Coordinates: 42°12′1″N 86°10′26″W
- Country: United States
- State: Michigan
- County: Van Buren

Area
  - Total: 33.8 sq mi (87.6 km^{2})
  - Land: 33.7 sq mi (87.3 km^{2})
  - Water: 0.12 sq mi (0.3 km^{2})
- Elevation: 682 ft (208 m)

Population (2020)
  - Total: 3,021
  - Density: 89.6/sq mi (34.6/km^{2})
- Time zone: UTC-5 (Eastern (EST))
  - Summer (DST): UTC-4 (EDT)
- ZIP code: 49057
- Area code: 269
- FIPS code: 26-36980
- GNIS feature ID: 1626445
- Website: https://hartfordtownship.org/

Hartford Township is a civil township of Van Buren County in the U.S. state of Michigan. The population was 3,021 at the 2020 census. The City of Hartford is located within the township, but is administratively autonomous.

== Geography ==
According to the United States Census Bureau, the township has a total area of 33.8 square miles (88 km^{2}), of which 33.7 square miles (87 km^{2}) is land and 0.1 square miles (0.26 km^{2}) (0.35%) is water.

== Demographics ==
As of the census of 2000, there were 3,159 people, 1,095 households, and 830 families residing in the township. The population density was 93.7 inhabitants per square mile (36.2/km^{2}). There were 1,183 housing units at an average density of 35.1 per square mile (13.6/km^{2}). The racial makeup of the township was 87.05% White, 0.47% African American, 1.20% Native American, 0.22% Asian, 8.90% from other races, and 2.15% from two or more races. Hispanic or Latino of any race were 15.51% of the population.

There were 1,095 households, out of which 37.3% had children under the age of 18 living with them, 60.4% were married couples living together, 10.0% had a female householder with no husband present, and 24.2% were non-families. 20.1% of all households were made up of individuals, and 7.0% had someone living alone who was 65 years of age or older. The average household size was 2.78 and the average family size was 3.17.

In the township the population was spread out, with 28.9% under the age of 18, 8.2% from 18 to 24, 28.5% from 25 to 44, 24.1% from 45 to 64, and 10.3% who were 65 years of age or older. The median age was 35 years. For every 100 females, there were 109.1 males. For every 100 females age 18 and over, there were 102.8 males.

The median income for a household in the township was $35,741, and the median income for a family was $39,830. Males had a median income of $31,588 versus $21,324 for females. The per capita income for the township was $14,801. About 10.2% of families and 12.8% of the population were below the poverty line, including 16.1% of those under age 18 and 5.4% of those age 65 or over.

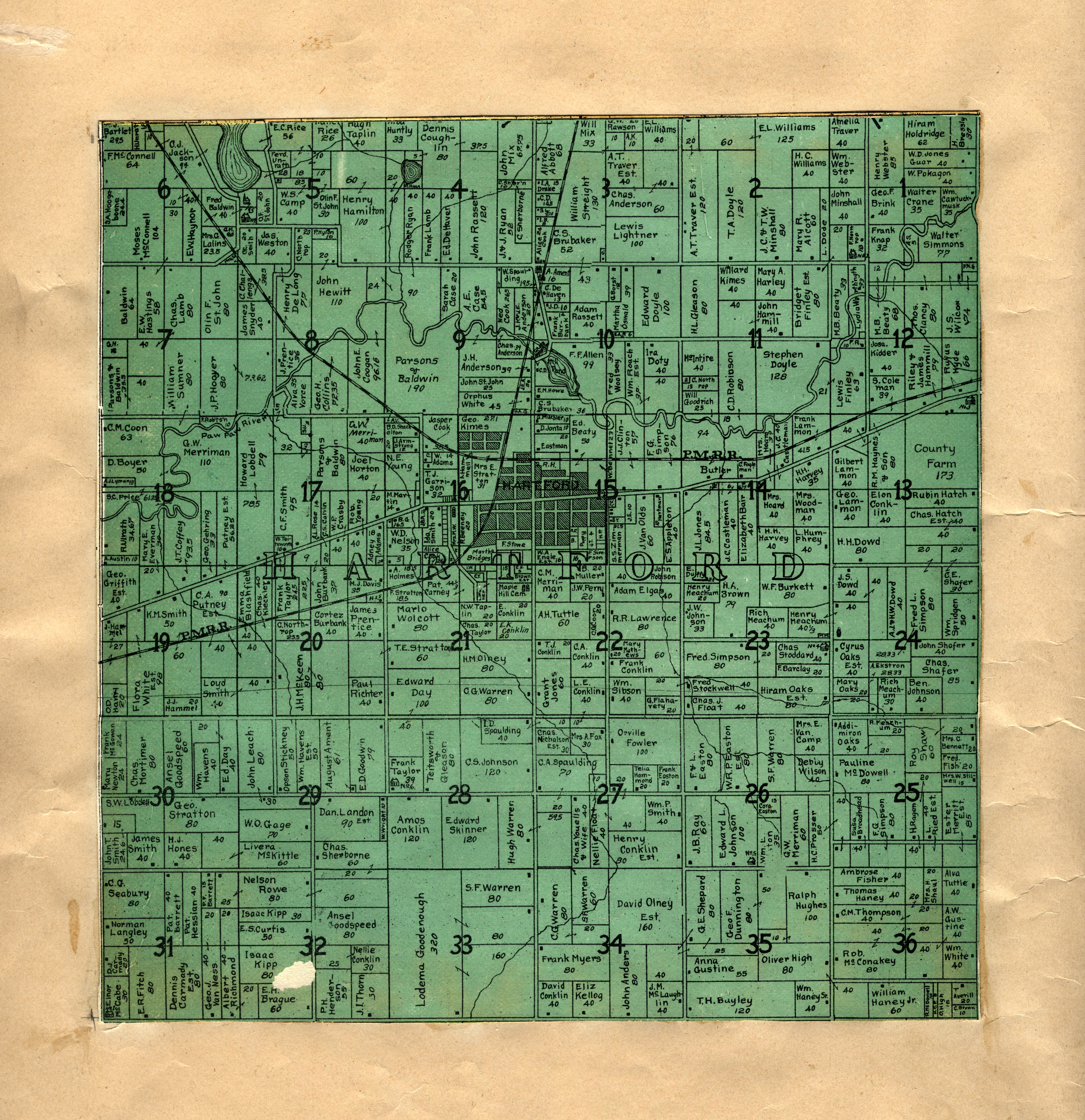
A 1906 cadastral map of Hartford Township, showing property lines and names of rural landowners
