= Van Buren County, Michigan =

County in Michigan, United States

- County
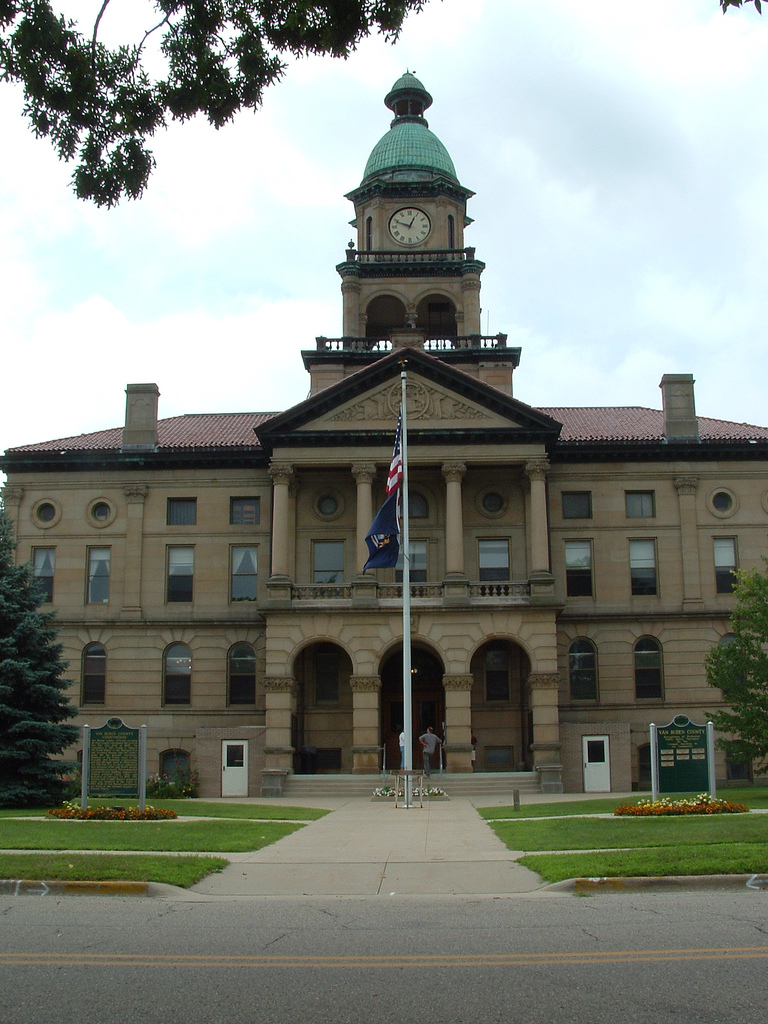
- Van Buren County Courthouse

- Seal

- Location within the U.S. state of Michigan
- Coordinates: 42°16′N 86°19′W
- Country: United States
- State: Michigan
- Created: 1829
- Organized: 1837
- Named for: Martin Van Buren
- Seat: Paw Paw
- Largest city: South Haven

Area
  - Total: 1,090 sq mi (2,800 km^{2})
  - Land: 607 sq mi (1,570 km^{2})
  - Water: 482 sq mi (1,250 km^{2}) 44%

Population (2020)
  - Total: 75,587
  - Estimate (2025): 76,071 ▲
  - Density: 125/sq mi (48.1/km^{2})
- Time zone: UTC−5 (Eastern)
  - Summer (DST): UTC−4 (EDT)
- Congressional district: 4th
- Website: www.vanburencountymi.gov

Van Buren County is a county located in the U.S. state of Michigan. As of the 2020 Census, the population was 75,587. The county seat is Paw Paw. The county was founded in 1829 and organized in 1837.

== History ==
The county was named for Martin Van Buren before he became president. He was U.S. Secretary of State and later Vice President under President Andrew Jackson; thus Van Buren is one of Michigan's "Cabinet counties".

The Van Buren County Courthouse was built by Claire Allen, a prominent Southern Michigan architect; its cornerstone was laid on September 2, 1901, after a July vote to issue $35,000 in county bonds.

== Geography ==
According to the U.S. Census Bureau, the county has a total area of 1,090 square miles (2,800 km^{2}), of which 607 square miles (1,570 km^{2}) is land and 482 square miles (1,250 km^{2}) (44%) is water.

Much of the county is farmland dotted with small towns. Areas near Kalamazoo County, specifically Antwerp Township and Almena Township, are becoming suburbanized. Many of the inland lakes are ringed with homes, either by people living year-round or cottagers, generally people who live the rest of the time in Chicago. As with other areas near Lake Michigan, tourism is a major industry.

=== Rivers ===
- Paw Paw River
- Black River

=== Adjacent counties ===
By land

- Allegan County (north)
- Kalamazoo County (east)
- St. Joseph County (southeast)
- Cass County (south)
- Berrien County (southwest)

By water

- Lake County, Illinois (west)

=== Parks, preserves, natural areas ===
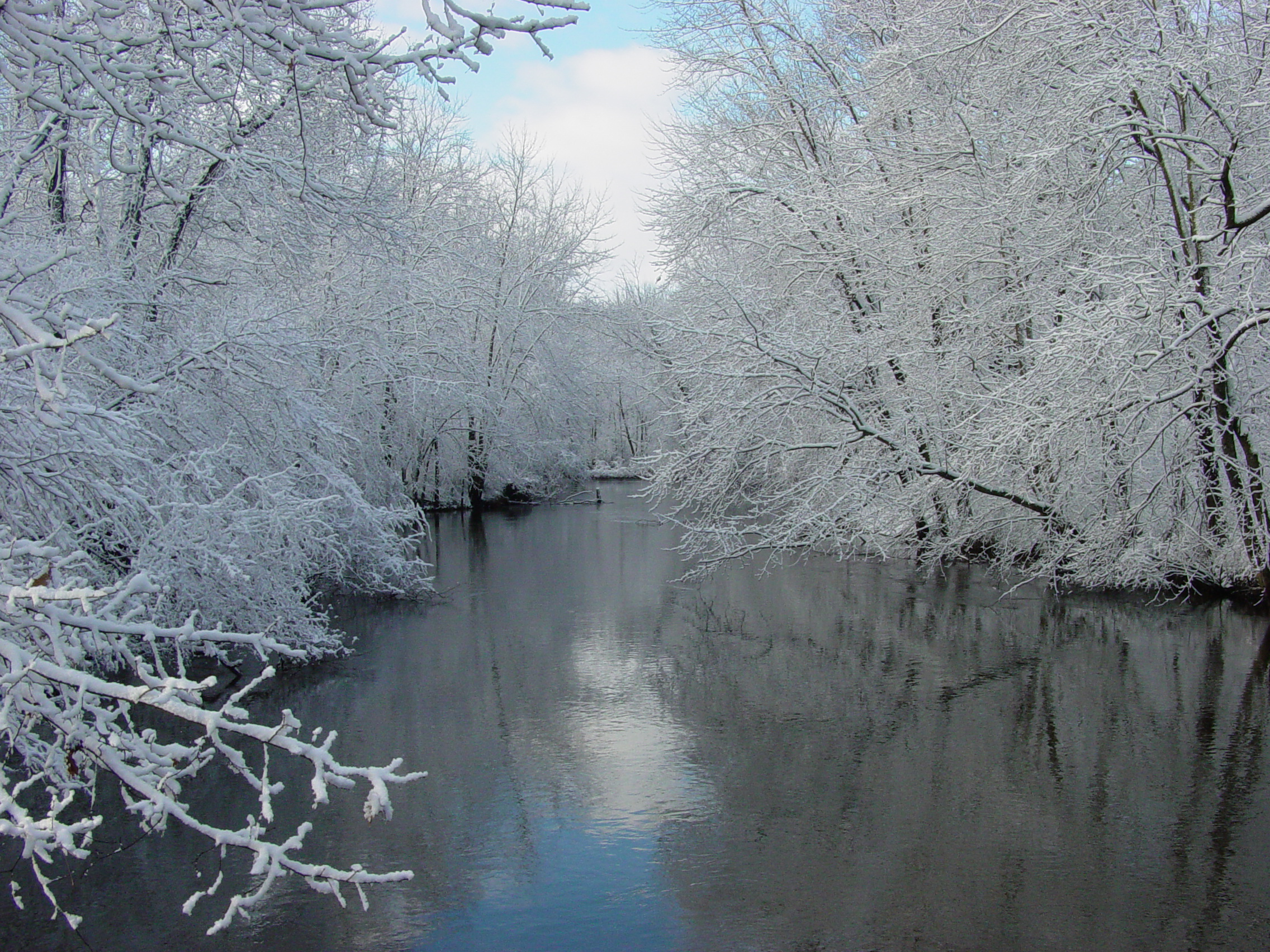
Paw Paw River in Van Buren County

- Dunes Parkway, an 84-acre (340,000 m^{2}) preserve of dunes in Covert Township
- Hamilton Township Coastal Plain Marsh Nature Sanctuary, a 79-acre (320,000 m^{2}) preserve of coastal plain marsh in Hamilton Township owned by the Michigan Nature Association
- Jeptha Lake Fen Preserve, a 49-acre (200,000 m^{2}) preserve in Columbia Township
- Kal-Haven Trail, a multi-use trail converted from old rail line that runs from Kalamazoo to South Haven
- Keeler State Game Area, 400 acres (162 ha) (1.6 km^{2}) in Keeler Township
- North Point Park - high dunes on 17 acres (69,000 m^{2}) on Lake Michigan, north of Van Buren State Park
- Ross Preserve, a 1,449 acres (5.86 km^{2}) preserve of coastal plain marsh in Covert Township owned by The Nature Conservancy
- Van Buren State Park
- Van Buren Trail State Park is adjacent to Kal-Haven Trail

== Transportation ==
=== Highways ===
- I-94
- I-196
- BL I-196
- US 31
- M-40
- M-51
- M-140
- M-152
- A-2
- M-43

=== Public transportation ===
- Pere Marquette (Amtrak train)
- Van Buren Public Transit

=== Railroads ===
- Amtrak
- CSX Transportation
- Norfolk Southern, through Amtrak owned Michigan Line
- West Michigan Railroad

== Demographics ==
Historical population
| Census | Pop. | Note | %± |
|---|---|---|---|
| 1830 | 5 | | — |
| 1840 | 1,910 | | 38,100.0% |
| 1850 | 5,800 | | 203.7% |
| 1860 | 15,224 | | 162.5% |
| 1870 | 28,829 | | 89.4% |
| 1880 | 30,807 | | 6.9% |
| 1890 | 30,541 | | −0.9% |
| 1900 | 33,274 | | 8.9% |
| 1910 | 33,185 | | −0.3% |
| 1920 | 30,715 | | −7.4% |
| 1930 | 32,637 | | 6.3% |
| 1940 | 35,111 | | 7.6% |
| 1950 | 39,184 | | 11.6% |
| 1960 | 48,395 | | 23.5% |
| 1970 | 56,173 | | 16.1% |
| 1980 | 66,814 | | 18.9% |
| 1990 | 70,060 | | 4.9% |
| 2000 | 76,263 | | 8.9% |
| 2010 | 76,258 | | 0.0% |
| 2020 | 75,587 | | −0.9% |
| 2025 (est.) | 76,071 | ▲ | 0.6% |
US Decennial Census; 1790-1960 1900-1990; 1990-2000 2010-2018

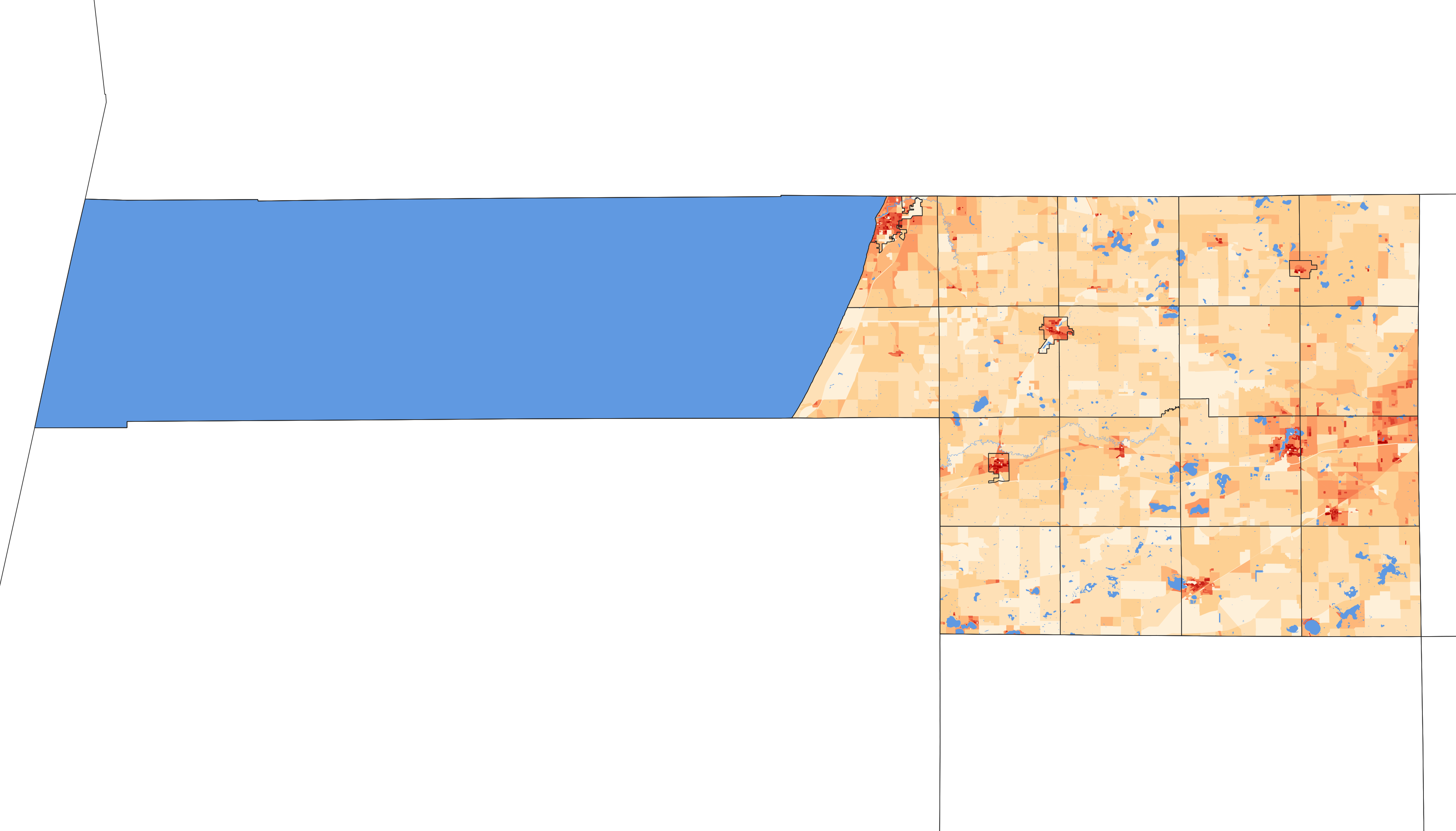
2020 population density of Van Buren County MI by census block

=== Racial and ethnic composition ===
Van Buren County, Michigan – Racial and ethnic composition Note: the US Census treats Hispanic/Latino as an ethnic category. This table excludes Latinos from the racial categories and assigns them to a separate category. Hispanics/Latinos may be of any race.
| Race / Ethnicity (NH = Non-Hispanic) | Pop 1980 | Pop 1990 | Pop 2000 | Pop 2010 | Pop 2020 | % 1980 | % 1990 | % 2000 | % 2010 | % 2020 |
|---|---|---|---|---|---|---|---|---|---|---|
| White alone (NH) | 59,603 | 62,337 | 64,466 | 63,028 | 59,400 | 89.21% | 88.98% | 84.53% | 82.65% | 78.58% |
| Black or African American alone (NH) | 5,005 | 4,643 | 3,939 | 3,007 | 2,348 | 7.49% | 6.63% | 5.17% | 3.94% | 3.11% |
| Native American or Alaska Native alone (NH) | 468 | 597 | 651 | 530 | 552 | 0.70% | 0.85% | 0.85% | 0.70% | 0.73% |
| Asian alone (NH) | 119 | 192 | 226 | 300 | 384 | 0.18% | 0.27% | 0.30% | 0.39% | 0.51% |
| Native Hawaiian or Pacific Islander alone (NH) | x | x | 4 | 15 | 27 | x | x | 0.01% | 0.02% | 0.04% |
| Other race alone (NH) | 120 | 37 | 87 | 63 | 285 | 0.18% | 0.05% | 0.11% | 0.08% | 0.38% |
| Mixed race or Multiracial (NH) | x | x | 1,256 | 1,557 | 3,625 | x | x | 1.65% | 2.04% | 4.80% |
| Hispanic or Latino (any race) | 1,499 | 2,254 | 5,634 | 7,758 | 8,966 | 2.24% | 3.22% | 7.39% | 10.17% | 11.86% |
| Total | 66,814 | 70,060 | 76,263 | 76,258 | 75,587 | 100.00% | 100.00% | 100.00% | 100.00% | 100.00% |

=== 2020 census ===
As of the 2020 census, the county had a population of 75,587. The median age was 42.1 years. 23.0% of residents were under the age of 18 and 19.2% of residents were 65 years of age or older. For every 100 females there were 98.4 males, and for every 100 females age 18 and over there were 97.3 males age 18 and over.

The racial makeup of the county was 81.2% White, 3.2% Black or African American, 1.1% American Indian and Alaska Native, 0.5% Asian, 0.1% Native Hawaiian and Pacific Islander, 5.8% from some other race, and 8.2% from two or more races. Hispanic or Latino residents of any race comprised 11.9% of the population.

21.9% of residents lived in urban areas, while 78.1% lived in rural areas.

There were 29,510 households in the county, of which 29.8% had children under the age of 18 living in them. Of all households, 50.5% were married-couple households, 18.1% were households with a male householder and no spouse or partner present, and 23.8% were households with a female householder and no spouse or partner present. About 26.4% of all households were made up of individuals and 12.4% had someone living alone who was 65 years of age or older.

There were 36,948 housing units, of which 20.1% were vacant. Among occupied housing units, 77.8% were owner-occupied and 22.2% were renter-occupied. The homeowner vacancy rate was 1.6% and the rental vacancy rate was 8.0%.

=== 2010 census ===
As of the 2010 United States census, Van Buren County had a 2010 population of 76,258. This decrease of -5 people from the 2000 United States census indicated a nearly-zero population change in the decade. The population density was 125.5 per square mile (48.5 per square kilometer). There were 36,785 housing units at an average density of 60.6 per square mile (23.4 per square kilometer). The racial and ethnic makeup of the county was 82.7% White, 3.9% Black or African American, 0.7% Native American, 0.4% Asian, 10.2% Hispanic or Latino, 0.1% from other races, and 2.0% from two or more races.

There were 28,928 households, out of which 33.4% had children under the age of 18 living with them, 53.0% were husband and wife families, 12.1% had a female householder with no husband present, 29.4% were non-families, and 24.0% were made up of individuals. The average household size was 2.61 and the average family size was 3.07.

The county population contained 25.5% under age of 18, 7.8% from 18 to 24, 23.7% from 25 to 44, 29.3% from 45 to 64, and 13.8% who were 65 years of age or older. The median age was 40 years. For every 100 females, there were 98.3 males. For every 100 females age 18 and over, there were 96 males.

=== 2010 American Community Survey ===
The 2010 American Community Survey 1-year estimate indicates the median income for a household in the county was $44,242 and the median income for a family was $53,642. Males had a median income of $28,079 versus $18,124 for females. The per capita income for the county was $21,495. About 10.0% of families and 14.8% of the population were below the poverty line, including 21.1% of those under the age 18 and 11.8% of those age 65 or over.

== Communities ==
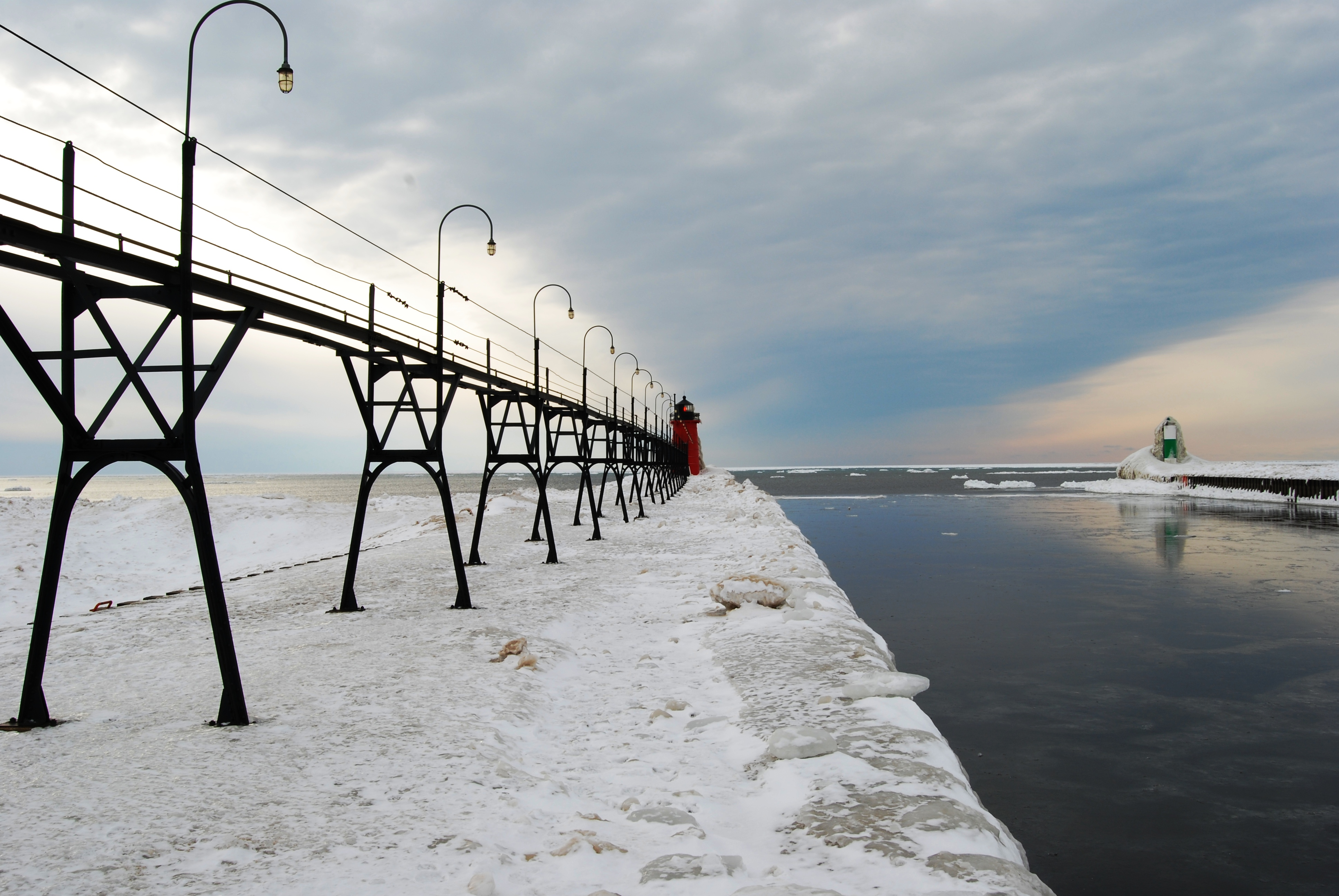
South Haven Light, south pier

=== Cities ===
- Bangor
- Gobles
- Hartford
- South Haven (partial)

=== Villages ===
- Bloomingdale
- Breedsville
- Decatur
- Lawrence
- Lawton
- Mattawan
- Paw Paw (county seat)

=== Unincorporated communities ===
- Almena
- Berlamont (originally Bear Lake Mills)
- Columbia
- Corwin
- Covert
- Crystal Beach
- Fritzburg
- Glendale (named Lemont during 1868)
- Grand Junction
- Keeler
- Kibbie
- Kendall
- Lake-of-the-Woods
- Lacota (originally West Geneva, then Irvington)
- Maple Grove Corners
- McDonald
- Mentha (ghost town)
- North Lake
- Pine Grove Mills
- Roth Valley
- Sister Lakes
- Stoughton Corners
- Tea Pot Dome
- Toquin
- West Bangor

=== Townships ===
- Almena Township
- Antwerp Township
- Arlington Township
- Bangor Township
- Bloomingdale Township
- Columbia Township
- Covert Township
- Decatur Township
- Geneva Township
- Hamilton Township
- Hartford Township
- Keeler Township
- Lawrence Township
- Paw Paw Township
- Pine Grove Township
- Porter Township
- South Haven Township
- Waverly Township

=== Former townships ===
- Clinch Township existed from 1837 until 1842, when it was divided into Waverly Township and Almena Township.

== Government ==
Van Buren County has usually voted Republican in national elections. Since 1884, the county's voters have selected the Republican Party nominee in 81% (29 of 36) of the national elections through 2024. However, the county has become a swing county as well as a bellwether in recent decades, voting for the overall winner in every presidential election from 1964 to 2024 with two exceptions: 1976, when the county backed native Michigander Gerald Ford who narrowly lost his bid for a full term, and 2020, when Van Buren County stayed with Donald Trump, a popular candidate in this county and other rural bellwethers.

United States presidential election results for Van Buren County, Michigan
| Year | Republican | | Democratic | | Third party(ies) | |
| Year | No. | % | No. | % | No. | % |
|---|---|---|---|---|---|---|
| 1884 | 4,219 | 56.11% | 2,933 | 39.01% | 367 | 4.88% |
| 1888 | 4,783 | 58.05% | 2,986 | 36.24% | 471 | 5.72% |
| 1892 | 3,788 | 54.05% | 2,182 | 31.14% | 1,038 | 14.81% |
| 1896 | 4,510 | 51.95% | 3,982 | 45.87% | 190 | 2.19% |
| 1900 | 4,892 | 58.72% | 3,235 | 38.83% | 204 | 2.45% |
| 1904 | 5,254 | 72.67% | 1,634 | 22.60% | 342 | 4.73% |
| 1908 | 4,531 | 62.80% | 2,313 | 32.06% | 371 | 5.14% |
| 1912 | 2,101 | 29.01% | 1,994 | 27.53% | 3,147 | 43.45% |
| 1916 | 4,302 | 55.32% | 3,225 | 41.47% | 249 | 3.20% |
| 1920 | 6,904 | 75.11% | 1,988 | 21.63% | 300 | 3.26% |
| 1924 | 7,384 | 71.55% | 1,646 | 15.95% | 1,290 | 12.50% |
| 1928 | 9,325 | 77.39% | 2,643 | 21.93% | 82 | 0.68% |
| 1932 | 6,954 | 47.50% | 7,223 | 49.33% | 464 | 3.17% |
| 1936 | 9,110 | 54.70% | 6,720 | 40.35% | 825 | 4.95% |
| 1940 | 11,571 | 66.90% | 5,625 | 32.52% | 101 | 0.58% |
| 1944 | 10,951 | 68.29% | 5,002 | 31.19% | 84 | 0.52% |
| 1948 | 9,511 | 67.92% | 4,082 | 29.15% | 411 | 2.93% |
| 1952 | 13,231 | 70.91% | 5,309 | 28.45% | 119 | 0.64% |
| 1956 | 13,291 | 69.72% | 5,678 | 29.79% | 94 | 0.49% |
| 1960 | 12,903 | 64.21% | 7,082 | 35.24% | 111 | 0.55% |
| 1964 | 8,120 | 41.63% | 11,336 | 58.12% | 48 | 0.25% |
| 1968 | 10,676 | 51.81% | 7,304 | 35.44% | 2,627 | 12.75% |
| 1972 | 13,903 | 64.57% | 7,159 | 33.25% | 469 | 2.18% |
| 1976 | 13,615 | 56.02% | 10,366 | 42.65% | 321 | 1.32% |
| 1980 | 14,451 | 55.96% | 9,248 | 35.81% | 2,125 | 8.23% |
| 1984 | 16,426 | 64.55% | 8,853 | 34.79% | 166 | 0.65% |
| 1988 | 14,522 | 57.17% | 10,668 | 42.00% | 210 | 0.83% |
| 1992 | 10,357 | 34.25% | 12,466 | 41.23% | 7,414 | 24.52% |
| 1996 | 11,347 | 40.56% | 13,355 | 47.74% | 3,273 | 11.70% |
| 2000 | 14,792 | 50.17% | 13,796 | 46.79% | 894 | 3.03% |
| 2004 | 17,634 | 51.60% | 16,151 | 47.26% | 389 | 1.14% |
| 2008 | 15,534 | 44.68% | 18,588 | 53.47% | 644 | 1.85% |
| 2012 | 16,141 | 49.15% | 16,290 | 49.61% | 406 | 1.24% |
| 2016 | 17,890 | 53.77% | 13,258 | 39.84% | 2,126 | 6.39% |
| 2020 | 21,591 | 55.16% | 16,803 | 42.92% | 752 | 1.92% |
| 2024 | 23,407 | 56.86% | 17,175 | 41.72% | 587 | 1.43% |

United States Senate election results for Van Buren County, Michigan
| Year | Republican | | Democratic | | Third party(ies) | |
| Year | No. | % | No. | % | No. | % |
|---|---|---|---|---|---|---|
| 2024 | 22,570 | 55.60% | 16,798 | 41.38% | 1,228 | 3.02% |

Michigan Gubernatorial election results for Van Buren County
| Year | Republican | | Democratic | | Third party(ies) | |
| Year | No. | % | No. | % | No. | % |
|---|---|---|---|---|---|---|
| 2022 | 15,974 | 50.04% | 15,347 | 48.08% | 601 | 1.88% |

Van Buren County operates the County jail, maintains rural roads, operates the major local courts, records deeds, mortgages, and vital records, administers public health regulations, and participates with the state in the provision of social services. The county board of commissioners controls the budget and has limited authority to make laws or ordinances. In Michigan, most local government functions – police and fire, building and zoning, tax assessment, street maintenance etc. – are the responsibility of individual cities and townships.

=== Elected Officials ===
==== Four-year terms ending 2024-12-31 ====
- Prosecuting Attorney: Susan Zuiderveen (R)
- Sheriff: Dan Abbott (R)
- County Clerk: Suzie Roehm (R)
- County Treasurer: Trisha Nesbitt (R)
- Register of Deeds: Paul W. DeYoung (R)
- Drain Commissioner: Joe Parman (R)
- County Surveyor: Charles Lossie (R)

=== Board of Commissioners: 7 members, elected from districts ===
==== Current partisan breakdown: 1 Democrat, 6 Republicans ====
| District | Commissioner | Party | District's Area |
|---|---|---|---|
| 1 | Gail Patterson-Gladney | Democrat | City of South Haven and Townships of Covert and South Haven |
| 2 | Mike Chappell | Republican | City of Hartford and Townships of Bangor, Hartford, and Lawrence |
| 3 | Kurt Doroh | Republican | City of Bangor and Townships of Arlington, Columbia, and Geneva |
| 4 | Dick Godfrey | Republican | City of Gobles and Townships of Almena (part), Bloomingdale, Pine Grove, Waverly (part) |
| 5 | Randall Peat (chairperson) | Republican | Townships of Antwerp (part), Paw Paw, and Waverly (part) |
| 6 | Tina Leary | Republican | Townships of Antwerp (Village of Lawton only), Decatur, Hamilton, Keeler, and Porter |
| 7 | Paul Schincariol (Vice-chair) | Republican | Townships of Almena (part) and Antwerp (part) |

(information correct in May 2023)

== See also ==
- List of Michigan State Historic Sites in Van Buren County
- National Register of Historic Places listings in Van Buren County, Michigan
