= Keeler Township, Michigan =

- Township
- Location within the state of Michigan Keeler Township, Michigan (the United States)
- Coordinates: 42°6′21″N 86°10′33″W
- Country: United States
- State: Michigan
- County: Van Buren

Area
  - Total: 35.0 sq mi (90.7 km^{2})
  - Land: 34.0 sq mi (88.1 km^{2})
  - Water: 1.0 sq mi (2.6 km^{2})
- Elevation: 804 ft (245 m)

Population (2020)
  - Total: 1,968
  - Density: 57.9/sq mi (22.3/km^{2})
- Time zone: UTC-5 (Eastern (EST))
  - Summer (DST): UTC-4 (EDT)
- FIPS code: 26-42500
- GNIS feature ID: 1626555
- Website: https://keelertownshipmi.gov/

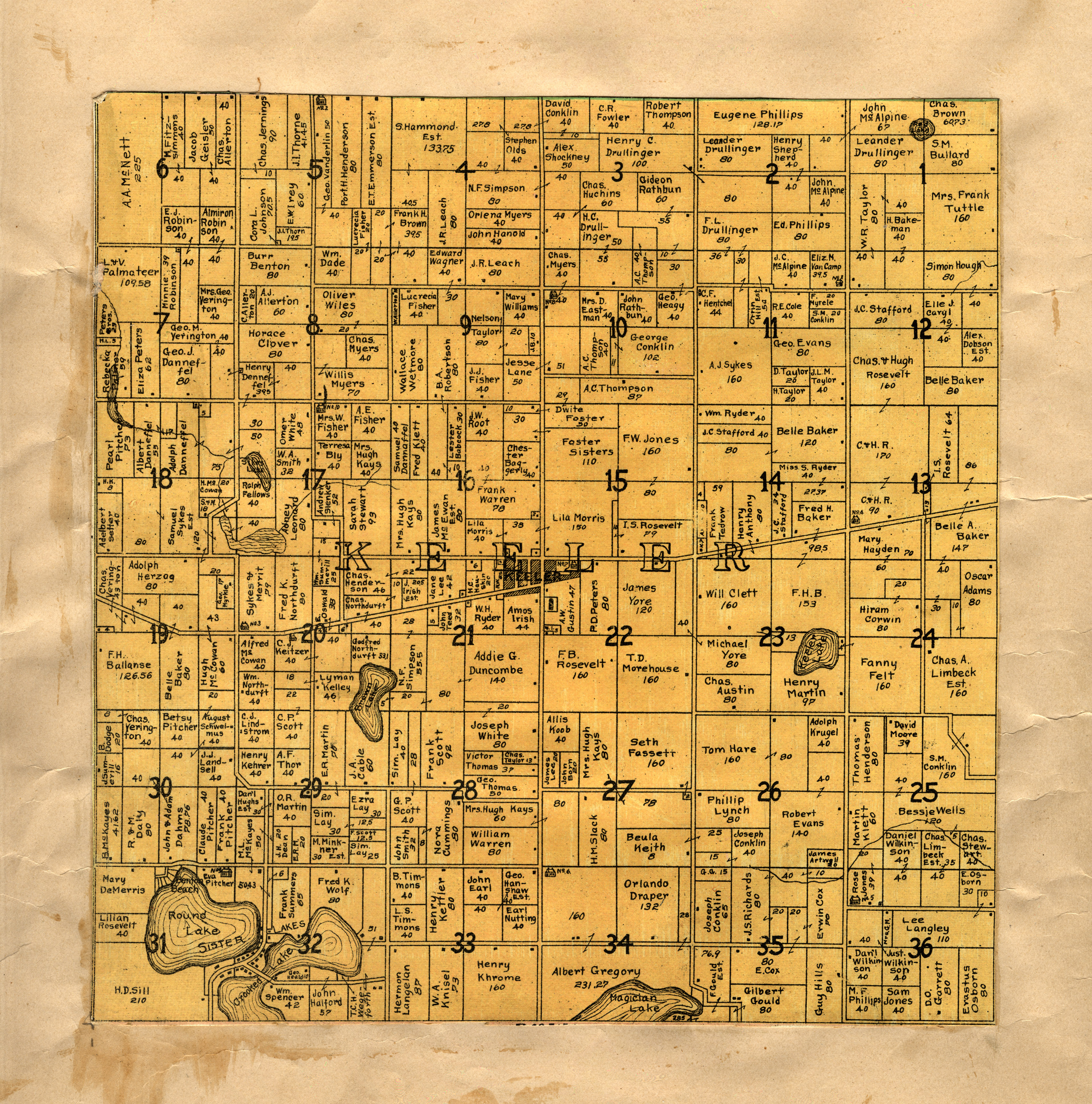
A 1906 cadastral map of Keeler Township, showing property lines and names of rural landowners

Keeler Township is a civil township in Van Buren County, Michigan, USA. At the 2020 census, the population was 1,968.

Keeler Township is largely agricultural, though it has a large influx of summer visitors who own cottages or stay at summer resorts in the Sister Lakes area in the township's southwest corner. The Sister Lakes area, though unincorporated, has the largest collection of retail establishments in the township. (The area extends into adjacent Silver Creek Township in Cass County.)

Township offices are in Keeler, which also has some stores.

== Communities ==
- Sister Lakes
- Keeler

== History ==
In 1964, the Sister Lakes area gained national notoriety when an area resident reported seeing a Bigfoot-like creature. ABC News filed a report after hearing about monster hunters congregating in the area following the claimed sighting. In 2023, a new town hall was built. Before that, all township government business was conducted in an open room inside the Keeler Fire Department building.

== Geography ==
According to the United States Census Bureau, the township has a total area of 35.0 square miles (91 km^{2}), of which 34.0 square miles (88 km^{2}) is land and 1.0 square mile (2.6 km^{2}) (2.88%) is water.

== Demographics ==
At the 2000 census, there were 2,601 people, 870 households and 629 families residing in the township. The population density was 76.5 per square mile (29.5/km^{2}). There were 1,562 housing units at an average density of 45.9 per square mile (17.7/km^{2}). The racial make up of the township was 88.85% White, 1.35% African American, 1.15% Native American, 0.15% Asian, 5.61% from other races, and 2.88% from two or more races. Hispanic or Latino of any race were 22.57% of the population.

There were 870 households, of which 30.8% had children under the age of 18 living with them, 58.2% were married couples living together, 9.2% had a female householder with no husband present, and 27.6% were non-families. 22.2% of all households were made up of individuals, and 9.8% had someone living alone who was 65 years of age or older. The average household size was 2.71 and the average family size was 3.13.

29.1% of the population were under the age of 18, 7.9% from 18 to 24, 28.3% from 25 to 44, 22.4% from 45 to 64, and 12.3% were 65 years of age or older. The median age was 35 years. For every 100 females, there were 105.5 males. For every 100 females age 18 and over, there were 105.0 males.

The median household income was $42,955 and the median family income was $47,083. Males had a median income of $32,069 and females $26,016#. The per capita income was $19,989. About 9.2% of families and 16.4% of the population were below the poverty line, including 20.0% of those under age 18 and 11.2% of those age 65 or over.

== Notable people ==
- Ernie Koob (born in Keeler, 1892), baseball pitcher, threw a no-hitter for 1917 St. Louis Browns
