= Bangor Township, Van Buren County, Michigan =

Bangor Township, Michigan
- Township
- Location within the state of Michigan Bangor Township, Michigan (the United States)
- Coordinates: 42°17′18″N 86°10′12″W
- Country: United States
- State: Michigan
- County: Van Buren

Area
  - Total: 34.5 sq mi (89.3 km^{2})
  - Land: 33.7 sq mi (87.3 km^{2})
  - Water: 0.73 sq mi (1.9 km^{2})
- Elevation: 669 ft (204 m)

Population (2020)
  - Total: 1,939
  - Density: 57.5/sq mi (22.2/km^{2})
- Time zone: UTC-5 (Eastern (EST))
  - Summer (DST): UTC-4 (EDT)
- ZIP code: 49013
- Area code: 269
- FIPS code: 26-05160
- GNIS feature ID: 1625880

Bangor Township is a civil township of Van Buren County in the U.S. state of Michigan. As of the 2020 census, the township population was 1,939. The City of Bangor is located in the northeast corner of the township, but is administratively autonomous. Bangor Township was organized in 1853.

== Geography ==
According to the United States Census Bureau, the township has a total area of 34.5 square miles (89 km^{2}), of which 33.7 square miles (87 km^{2}) is land and 0.7 square miles (1.8 km^{2}) (2.15%) is water.

== Demographics ==
As of the census of 2000, there were 2,121 people, 727 households, and 564 families residing in the township. The population density was 62.9 inhabitants per square mile (24.3/km^{2}). There were 942 housing units at an average density of 27.9 per square mile (10.8/km^{2}). The racial makeup of the township was 85.71% White, 3.96% African American, 1.18% Native American, 0.19% Asian, 6.46% from other races, and 2.50% from two or more races. Hispanic or Latino of any race were 13.06% of the population.

There were 727 households, out of which 34.3% had children under the age of 18 living with them, 64.4% were married couples living together, 9.2% had a female householder with no husband present, and 22.3% were non-families. 17.7% of all households were made up of individuals, and 6.5% had someone living alone who was 65 years of age or older. The average household size was 2.83 and the average family size was 3.17.

In the township the population was spread out, with 28.2% under the age of 18, 9.7% from 18 to 24, 26.4% from 25 to 44, 23.6% from 45 to 64, and 12.1% who were 65 years of age or older. The median age was 35 years. For every 100 females, there were 103.0 males. For every 100 females age 18 and over, there were 101.2 males.

The median income for a household in the township was $35,375, and the median income for a family was $38,355. Males had a median income of $32,313 versus $21,953 for females. The per capita income for the township was $16,759. About 9.7% of families and 11.6% of the population were below the poverty line, including 17.4% of those under age 18 and 6.8% of those age 65 or over.

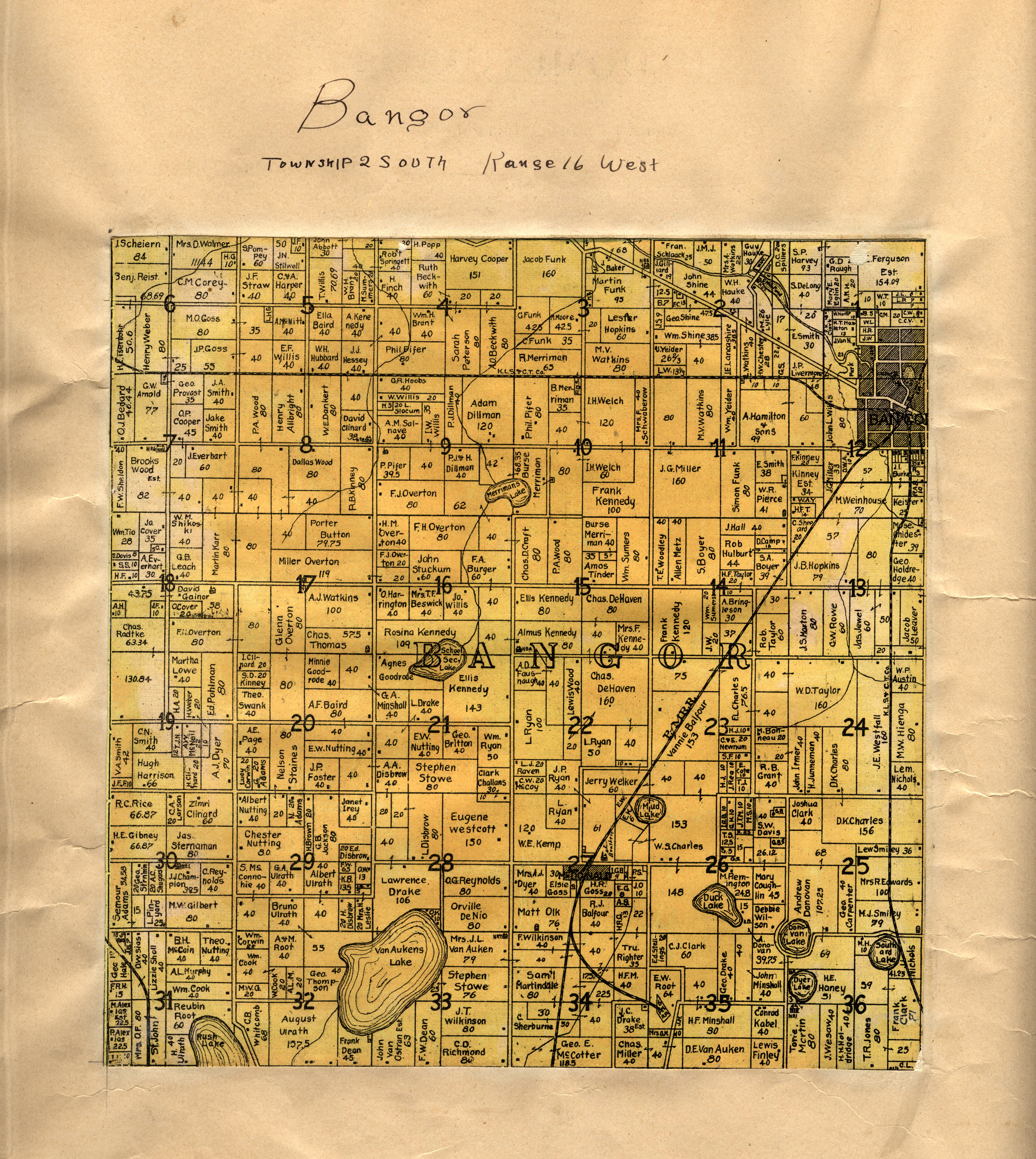
A 1906 cadastral map of Bangor Township, showing property lines and names of rural landowners
