= Kalamazoo and South Haven Railroad =

Railroad in Michigan

Overview
- Headquarters: Kalamazoo
- Locale: Michigan
- Dates of operation: 1871–1916

Technical
- Track gauge: 4 ft 8 1/2 in (1,435 mm) standard gauge

A K&SH stock certificate from 1893

The Kalamazoo and South Haven Railroad is a defunct railroad which operated in southern Michigan during the late 19th and early 20th centuries.

The company incorporated on April 2, 1869 with the intention of constructing a 40-mile (64 km) line from Kalamazoo to South Haven, on the shores of Lake Michigan. It was leased in 1870 to the Michigan Central Railroad and merged with the same in 1916. The former rail bed has been transformed into the Kal-Haven Trail.

The railroad went through the following towns, starting from the east:

- Kalamazoo, Michigan
- Alamo, Michigan
- Williams, Michigan
- Mentha, Michigan
- Kendall, Michigan
- Pine Grove Mills, Michigan
- Gobles, Michigan
- Bloomingdale, Michigan
- Berlamont, Michigan
- Grand Junction, Michigan
- Lacota, Michigan
- Kibbe, Michigan
- South Haven, Michigan
