= Bloomingdale Township, Michigan =

- Township
- Location within the state of Michigan Bloomingdale Township, Michigan (the United States)
- Coordinates: 42°22′57″N 85°56′25″W
- Country: United States
- State: Michigan
- County: Van Buren

Area
  - Total: 35.1 sq mi (90.9 km^{2})
  - Land: 34.1 sq mi (88.2 km^{2})
  - Water: 1.0 sq mi (2.7 km^{2})
- Elevation: 728 ft (222 m)

Population (2020)
  - Total: 2,930
  - Density: 86.0/sq mi (33.2/km^{2})
- Time zone: UTC-5 (Eastern (EST))
  - Summer (DST): UTC-4 (EDT)
- ZIP code: 49026
- Area code: 269
- FIPS code: 26-09240
- GNIS feature ID: 1625954

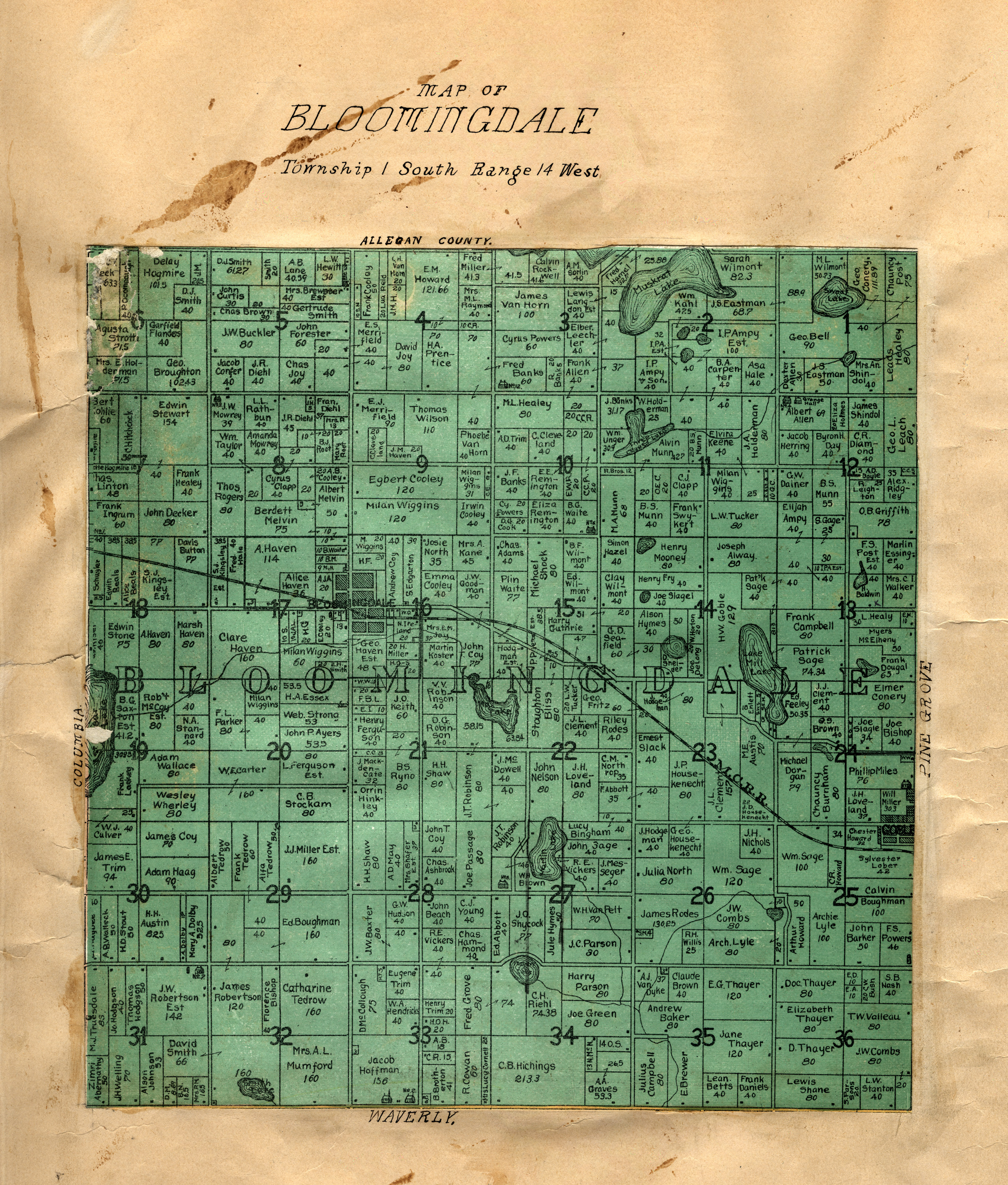
A 1906 cadastral map of Bloomingdale Township, showing property lines and names of rural landowners

Bloomingdale Township is a civil township of Van Buren County in the U.S. state of Michigan. As of the 2020 census, the township population was 2,930. It was established in 1845.

The village of Bloomingdale is located within the township, and is the only incorporated town. The unincorporated and tiny crossroads community of Berlamont is on the line with Columbia Township. On the eastern boundary is the city of Gobles which straddles the line with Pine Grove Township. Though half of Gobles lies within Bloomingdale Township, by law cities are considered separate from townships, though villages are not.

== History ==
The township is largely agricultural with some small resorts along with the Van Buren Youth Camp. Much of the population lives in the village of Bloomingdale and along the lakes.

Oil was discovered in the 1930s and production has ended, though there have been efforts to start pumping again.

The Kal-Haven Trail, used heavily by bicyclists in the summer and snowmobilers in the winter, goes through the township on a former railbed in a largely southeast–northwest direction, beginning with Gobles on the east, through Bloomingdale and exiting at Berlamont.

== Geography ==
According to the United States Census Bureau, the township has a total area of 35.1 square miles (91 km^{2}), of which 34.1 square miles (88 km^{2}) is land and 1.0 square mile (2.6 km^{2}) (2.94%) is water.

== Demographics ==
As of the census of 2000, there were 3,364 people, 1,179 households, and 878 families residing in the township. The population density was 98.7 inhabitants per square mile (38.1/km^{2}). There were 1,461 housing units at an average density of 42.9 per square mile (16.6/km^{2}). The racial makeup of the township was 93.49% White, 1.75% African American, 0.89% Native American, 0.21% Asian, 2.02% from other races, and 1.63% from two or more races. Hispanic or Latino of any race were 5.11% of the population.

There were 1,179 households, out of which 36.0% had children under the age of 18 living with them, 58.9% were married couples living together, 10.3% had a female householder with no husband present, and 25.5% were non-families. 19.1% of all households were made up of individuals, and 6.5% had someone living alone who was 65 years of age or older. The average household size was 2.74 and the average family size was 3.12.

In the township the population was spread out, with 28.6% under the age of 18, 8.1% from 18 to 24, 27.2% from 25 to 44, 24.0% from 45 to 64, and 12.1% who were 65 years of age or older. The median age was 37 years. For every 100 females, there were 100.4 males. For every 100 females age 18 and over, there were 95.8 males.

The median income for a household in the township was $40,488, and the median income for a family was $43,841. Males had a median income of $31,985 versus $25,853 for females. The per capita income for the township was $16,337. About 7.2% of families and 12.3% of the population were below the poverty line, including 13.5% of those under age 18 and 5.2% of those age 65 or over.
