= Avery Haines =

Canadian television journalist (born 1966)

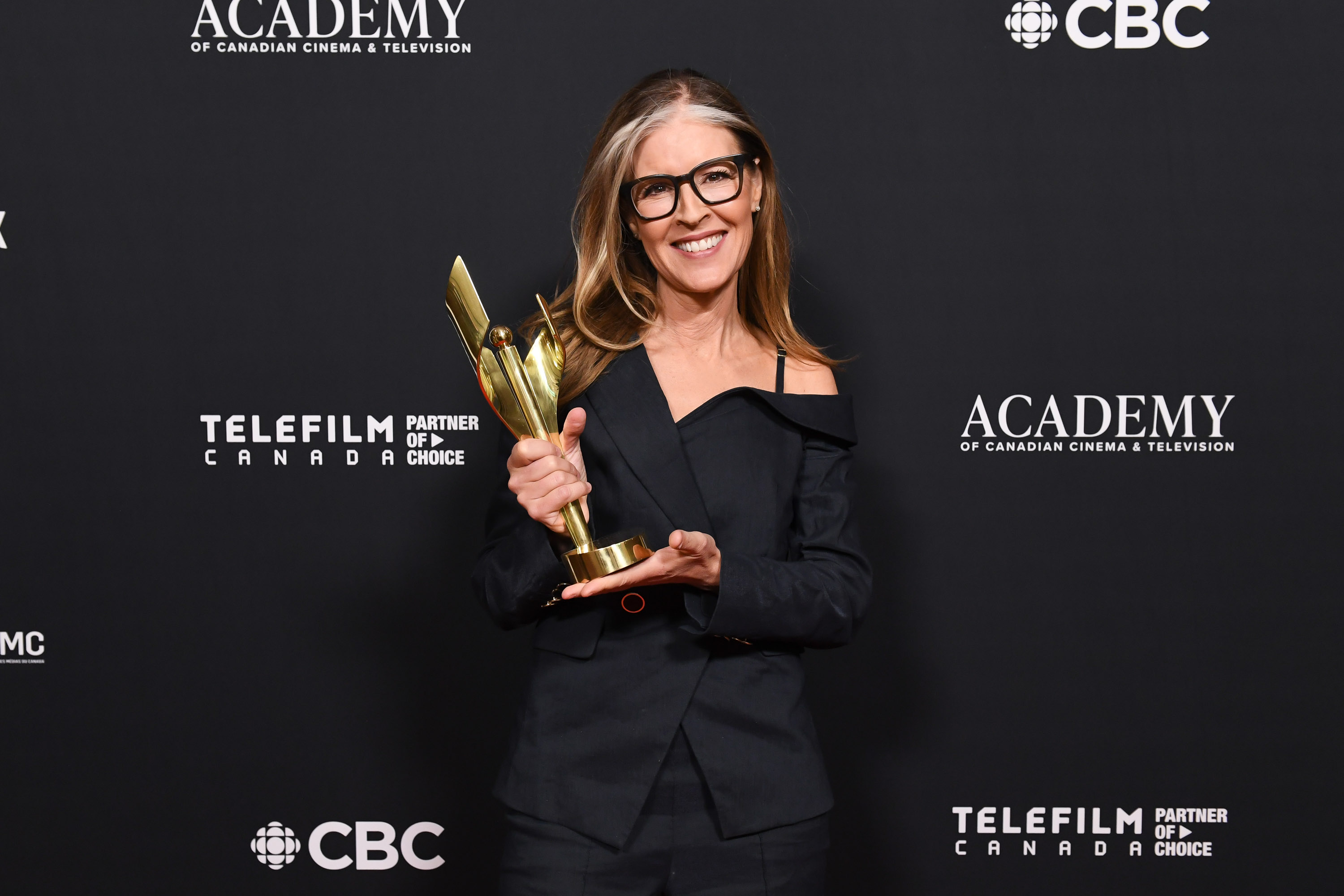
- 2023 CSA winner for Best Host or Interviewer
- Born: 28 November 1966 (age 59); New Mexico, United States
- Occupation: Journalist
- Children: 3
- Relatives: Emily Haines (sister)

Avery Hayward Haines (born 28 November 1966) is an American-born Canadian television journalist. She is the investigative journalist and producer of the documentary series W5's Avery Haines Investigates, airing on the CTV network. Born in New Mexico, United States, Haines and her family then moved to India where they lived for six years before returning to North America. Her career as a reporter began with CFRB radio in Toronto.

== Career ==
=== CTV Newsnet ===
In late 1999, Haines became a fill-in anchor for CTV Newsnet.

=== City TV ===
Haines was hired by Citytv Toronto as a general reporter with CityNews. In fall 2001, she began hosting Health on the Line, which aired on Life Network and Discovery Health for five seasons.

On 15 September 2010, Haines returned to Citytv as a senior reporter and anchor. Beginning on 26 January 2012, she wrote and hosted the award-winning Inside Story on Citytv.

In 2016, Haines began to produce and shoot her own documentaries. Whilst volunteering on a medical humanitarian mission to post-Ebola Liberia, she produced a documentary highlighting the plight of chimpanzees that were abandoned following years of experimentation by a U.S. research laboratory. Haines also interviewed the former Warlord Charles G. Taylor's wife and current vice-president of Liberia, Jewel Howard Taylor, producing a documentary called My Penpal: The Warlord's Wife. The following year, during the final offensive against the Islamic State of Iraq and the Levant (ISIS) in West Mosul, Haines was embedded with the Iraqi Special Forces in an abandoned mosque that had previously served as an ISIS headquarters. Both documentaries were nominated for RTDNA Awards, and Two Kilometres to Terror: Life and Death Under ISIS was awarded the 2018 RTDNA Dave Rogers Award for Long Feature (Large Market).'

On 12 October 2017, during the 5 pm newscast, CityNews, Haines announced she would be leaving the organization.

=== CTV W5 ===
On 12 October 2017, CTV announced on social media that Haines had accepted a job as a co-host and correspondent on its news magazine, W5. She has since won and been nominated for numerous awards for her national and international long-format investigative documentaries.

In 2019, W5 was awarded the RTDNA Dan McArthur Award for Investigative Journalism for her one-hour documentary, W5: No Witnesses, an exposé of a global sex abuse cover-up within the Jehovah's Witnesses sect. In 2019, Haines also won the Innocence Canada Tracey Tyler Award for Justice for the Wrongly Convicted for W5: An Indigenous man's quest to clear his name.

In 2020, Haines won a Canadian Screen Award for "Best Host or Interviewer, News or Information" for the W5 investigation The Narco Riviera. The academy described the documentary as "A powerful investigation into drug cartel violence in Mexico and the risk posed to tourists, including Canadians, who travel south seeking sun and sand but may find their lives at risk. The documentary includes an exclusive, chilling interview with a cartel leader – a risky and difficult to organize a journalistic coup. Following the broadcast Mexican authorities stepped up their investigations, eventually arresting drug cartel members in the 'Narco Riviera'". Haines also won the 2020 Canadian Screen Award for "Best News or Information Program" for W5: The Baby in the Snow. This W5 investigation into who left 11-month-old Dusty Bowers to die in the snow forced the Ontario Provincial Police to reopen the 30-year-old cold case.

In 2021, Haines was awarded the Canadian Screen Award for "Best News or Information Program" for the W5 investigation The Invisible Man. This documentary investigates romance fraud, finding victims who have been scammed out of their life's savings, but also tracks the schemes to a vast international cartel of criminals, stretching to a secretive Nigerian fraud ring.

In 2022, Haines won the Canadian Screen Award for "Best News or Information Program" for the W5 investigation A Town Divided. The documentary investigates a preacher who made headlines for defying public health laws during the COVID-19 pandemic, sending shock waves through a small Ontario town. Pastor Henry Hildebrandt from the Christian Fundamentalist Church of God emerged as a hero to the anti-lockdown crowd, preaching against the government, police, and the medical community over public health restrictions. The W5 investigation uncovered former members who expose his church as a child-abusing cult with a prophecy about the looming apocalypse.

In February 2024, Bell Media announced that W5 would conclude as a regular television series after 58 seasons, due to cutbacks at the company. CTV News relaunched the brand as an investigative journalism unit, with Haines presenting long-form stories on the CTV National News and other CTV News platforms, and documentary specials under the branding "W5's Avery Haines Investigates".

== Awards ==
In 2002 and 2005, Haines' television programme Health on the Line won Gemini Awards for Best Talk Series. In 2005, she was nominated for a Gemini in a hosting/interviewer category.

In 2013, Haines' Inside Story won the Media Award by the Tema Conter Memorial Trust, for "Best In-depth Television Reporting", by the Radio Television Digital News Association (RTDNA) and the Canadian Medical Association Media Award, a Special Mention for "Excellence in Health Reporting" for Inside Story: 'Dystonia'.

In 2014, Inside Story was nominated for three Canadian Screen Awards including Best Local Reportage and Best News Information Segment.

In 2015, Haines received a Canadian Screen Award nomination for Best Local Reportage for When the Blue Line Flatlines.

In 2018, she was nominated for two RTDNAs for documentaries shot by herself in Liberia and Iraq: My Penpal: The Warlord's Wife and Two Kilometres to Terror: Life and Death Under ISIS. The latter documentary, filmed by Haines when she was embedded with the Iraqi Special Forces in West Mosul, also won the RTDNA Dave Rogers Award for Long Feature (Large Market).

In 2019, Haines won the RTDNA Dan MCArthur Award for "Investigative Journalism" for W5: No Witnesses, and the Innocence Canada Tracey Tyler Award for Justice for the Wrongly Convicted for W5: An Indigenous man's quest to clear his name.

In 2020, Haines won the Canadian Screen Award for "Best Host or Interviewer, News or Information" for W5: The Narco Riviera and "Best News or Information Program" for W5: the Baby in the Snow. Haines also won the RNAO "Best in-depth Feature" for the investigation W5: Inside a COVID-19 intensive care unit.

In 2021, Haines won the Canadian Screen Award for "Best News or Information Program" for the W5 investigation The Invisible Man. Haines also won the RTDNA for "News Information Program" for W5 Prisoner in Paradise.

In 2022, Haines won the Canadian Screen Award for "Best Host or Interviewer, News or Information" for her work on the W5 documentary A Town Divided.

In 2023, Haines won the Canadian Screen Award for "Best Host or Interviewer, News or Information". Haines was also awarded the Canadian Screen Award for the W5 documentary "Best News or Information Segment" for the investigation for The Humboldt Driver.

In 2024, Haines was nominated for the Canadian Screen Award for "Best Host or Interviewer, News or Information". W5 won the Canadian Screen Award for "Best News or Information Segment", Narco Avocados. W5 Narco Avocados was also awarded the RTDNA for "Best News Information Program".

In 2025, W5 won the Canadian Hillman Prize for Broadcast for its investigation Narco Jungle: The Darién Gap. This documentary also won the Canadian Screen Award for "Best News or Information Program". Haines also won the Canadian Screen Award for "Best Host or Interviewer, News or Information".

== Personal life ==
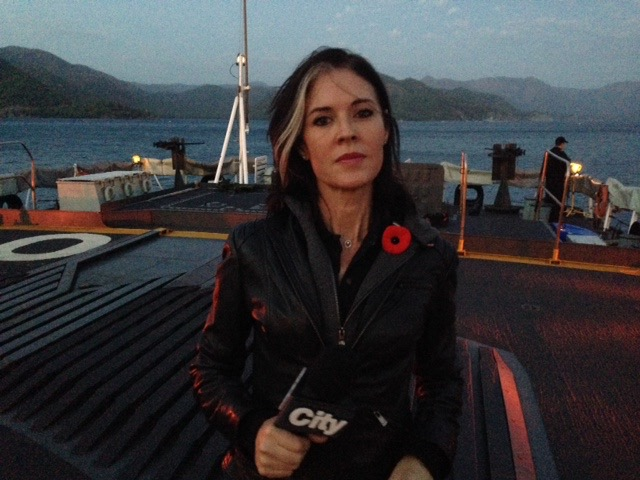
Avery Haines reporting from HMCS Toronto

Haines is the sister of Emily Haines, lead singer of the band Metric. Their father is Paul Haines, poet and librettist of Escalator over the Hill, which was co-written with Carla Bley.

Haines came out as being in a same-sex relationship following the 2016 Orlando nightclub shooting, which occurred eight weeks and one day after she married her partner, Mel.

== Controversy ==
On 15 January 2000, Haines made a mistake with a line while taping a report introduction. After regaining her composure, she made a joke, but the camera was still on. She retaped the segment, but later that day, a CTV technician mistakenly aired the tape that included the error and the comment. "I kind of like the stuttering thing. It's like equal opportunity right? We've got a stuttering newscaster. We've got the black, we've got the Asian, we've got the woman. I could be a lesbian-folk-dancing-black-woman stutterer. In a wheelchair ... with a gimping, rubber leg. Yeah, really. I'd have a successful career, let me tell you." On 17 January, Haines was fired from CTV Newsnet after her comments sparked controversy.
