= North Lake, Michigan =

North Lake, Michigan may refer to:

- North Lake, Dexter Township, Michigan, a historic settlement
- North Lake, Ishpeming Township, Michigan, an unincorporated community in Marquette County
- North Lake, Pine Grove Township, Michigan, an unincorporated community in Van Buren County
