= Columbia Township, Van Buren County, Michigan =

Columbia Township, Michigan
- Township
- Location within the state of Michigan Columbia Township, Michigan (the United States)
- Coordinates: 42°23′N 86°3′W
- Country: United States
- State: Michigan
- County: Van Buren

Area
  - Total: 35.4 sq mi (91.8 km^{2})
  - Land: 34.1 sq mi (88.3 km^{2})
  - Water: 1.4 sq mi (3.5 km^{2})
- Elevation: 682 ft (208 m)

Population (2020)
  - Total: 2,546
  - Density: 74.7/sq mi (28.8/km^{2})
- Time zone: UTC-5 (Eastern (EST))
  - Summer (DST): UTC-4 (EDT)
- FIPS code: 26-17440
- GNIS feature ID: 1626121
- Website: Township website

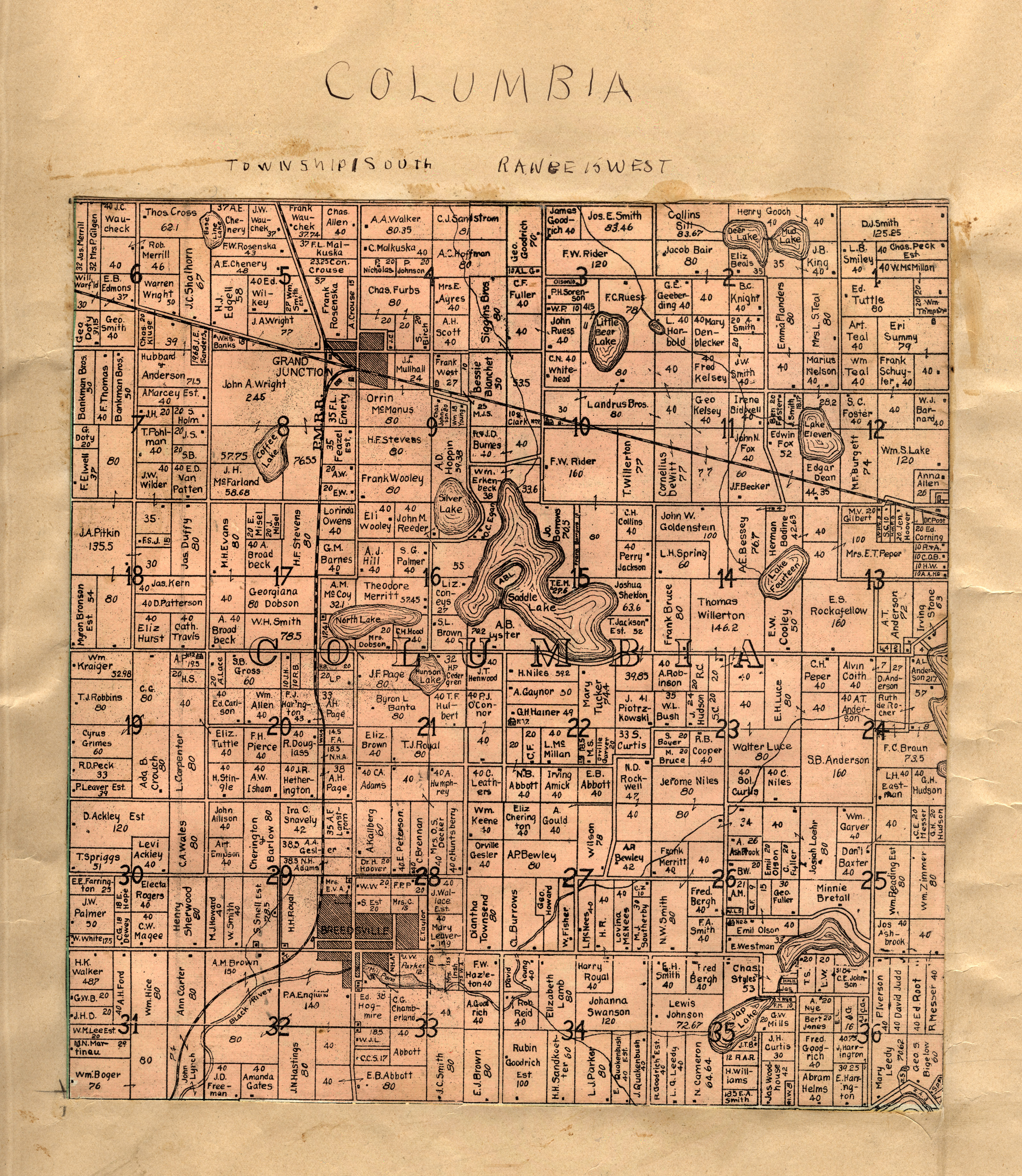
A 1906 cadastral map of Columbia Township, showing property lines and names of rural landowners

Columbia Township is a civil township of Van Buren County in the U.S. state of Michigan. The population was 2,588 at the 2010 census, down to 2,546 at the 2020 census.

Columbia Township is a largely rural area with many farms. It is also home to several lakes with a significant percentage of the population living on them, frequently retirees from Chicago. Many summer lake cottages are owned by families with roots in the Chicago area.

== Communities ==
There are three settlements in the township, none of them large.

- Breedsville is the only incorporated village, located in the southwest part of the township.
- Columbia was an unincorporated community platted in 1870.
- Grand Junction unincorporated, although it has a larger business district than Breedsville, is located in the northwest part of the township. It is so named because it is located at the junction of two railroad lines, though only one now survives. It was first settled by David Young in the fall of 1869 and platted on December 8, 1871
- Berlamont is an unincorporated crossroads community that straddles the eastern township boundary with Bloomingdale Township. It was formerly known as "Bear Lake Mills" and was a station on the now-defunct railroad between Bloomingdale and Grand Junction. It was centered around a sawmill built in 1857 by H. Anderson and Amos S. Brown.

The Kal-Haven Trail State Park goes through Columbia Township in an east–west direction, passing through both Berlamont and Grand Junction. The midpoint of the Kal-Haven trail is located in Bloomingdale.

== Geography ==
According to the United States Census Bureau, the township has a total area of 35.5 square miles (92 km^{2}), of which 34.1 square miles (88 km^{2}) is land and 1.4 square miles (3.6 km^{2}) (3.81%) is water.

== Demographics ==
As of the census of 2000, there were 2,714 people, 981 households, and 722 families residing in the township. The population density was 79.6 inhabitants per square mile (30.7/km^{2}). There were 1,433 housing units at an average density of 42.0 per square mile (16.2/km^{2}). The racial makeup of the township was 88.91% White, 3.06% African American, 1.03% Native American, 0.15% Asian, 4.64% from other races, and 2.21% from two or more races. Hispanic or Latino of any race were 7.55% of the population.

There were 981 households, out of which 31.5% had children under the age of 18 living with them, 58.7% were married couples living together, 10.0% had a female householder with no husband present, and 26.3% were non-families. 21.8% of all households were made up of individuals, and 7.5% had someone living alone who was 65 years of age or older. The average household size was 2.70 and the average family size was 3.14.

In the township the population was spread out, with 27.9% under the age of 18, 7.0% from 18 to 24, 28.3% from 25 to 44, 24.6% from 45 to 64, and 12.3% who were 65 years of age or older. The median age was 37 years. For every 100 females, there were 102.8 males. For every 100 females age 18 and over, there were 100.8 males.

The median income for a household in the township was $34,389, and the median income for a family was $39,583. Males had a median income of $30,712 versus $24,598 for females. The per capita income for the township was $15,015. About 10.2% of families and 18.0% of the population were below the poverty line, including 24.3% of those under age 18 and 14.7% of those age 65 or over.

== Notable people ==
- Daniel Sidney Warner
