= Tobias Tissen =

Canadian pastor

- Born: 1993 or 1994
- Occupation: Pastor
- Employer: Church of God (Restoration)
- Known for: Opposing COVID-19 public health regulations

Tobias Tissen (born 1993 or 1994) is a Canadian pastor who is noted for his repeated failures to comply with COVID-19 public health laws, and for preaching to his congregation to disobey them. He works for the Christian Church of God (Restoration) in Hanover, Manitoba.

In 2022, he was convicted for his repeated breaches of COVID-19 laws and fined.

== Early life ==
Tissen was born on 1993 or 1994.

== Adult life ==
Tissen works as a pastor at the plain dress Christian Church of God (Restoration) church in Hanover, Manitoba. During the COVID-19 pandemic, he advocated against public health regulations, and was noted for rejecting COVID-19 vaccines and opposing mask mandates. He urged his congregation to reject public health measures on both civil liberties and religious grounds. In January 2021, he was issued his third fine related to breaching COVID-19 public health measures. Tissen responded to the police action by comparing the Royal Canadian Mounted Police with the Gestapo.

During a May 2021 court case, Tissen told the Court of Queen's Bench of Manitoba in Winnipeg that it had no authority over him. At the time, Tissen and leaders of other rural churches were engaged in an unsuccessful legal bid to block provincial COVID-19 legislation, using legal arguments incorporating the Canadian Charter of Rights and Freedoms. The churches were represented by the Justice Centre for Constitutional Freedoms.

In October 2021, Tissen was arrested as a result of his May 2021 activities at an anti-COVID-19-public health rally. Bail conditions prevented him from contacting Chris Sky and four other people. In December 2021, he was observed wearing a face mask at Winnipeg James Armstrong Richardson International Airport, as he boarded a flight to Puerto Vallarta, Mexico. Tissen said he was attending a religious conference in the country where his church has six congregation members.

In August 2022, Tissen was convicted for numerous breaches of COVID-19 public health measures. The court issued him with a $16,492 fine. Tissen arranged a fundraising campaign to encourage his supporters to contribute to the $74,561 of fines that both he and church has accumulated during the pandemic. During 2021, prior to the fundraiser, the church raised $307,538 and spent $249,277 the same year.

== See also ==
- Artur Pawlowski
