= Daniel Sidney Warner =

Initiator of the Church of God

- Born: June 25, 1842; Bristol (now Marshallville), Ohio
- Died: December 12, 1895 (aged 53); Grand Junction, Michigan
- Resting place: Grand Junction, Michigan
- Education: Oberlin College
- Occupations: Theologian and church movement initiator
- Known for: Leader in the Holiness Movement
- Spouse(s): Tamzen Ann Kerr, Sarah Keller, Frances Miller
- Children: Levilla Modest and Sidney
- Parent(s): David and Leah Warner

Daniel Sidney Warner (June 25, 1842 – December 12, 1895) was an American church reformer and one of the founders of the Church of God (Anderson) and other similar church groups in the holiness movement. He called for evangelism, the preaching of entire sanctification, and the unity of Christians.

Warner taught the Restorationist concept of restoring the Church to New Testament practice. He is also known for some of his songs which other church groups have incorporated into their hymnody. He is mostly known by only the initials of his given and middle name, D. S. Warner, which was typical for his time period.

== Biography ==
=== Early years ===
Daniel Sidney Warner was born June 25, 1842, in Bristol (now Marshallville), Ohio, to David and Leah Warner. His father ran a tavern at the time of his birth and later was known for his drinking, but his mother, of Pennsylvania Dutch stock, is recorded by Warner to have been more virtuous. He was the fifth of six children. His speaking abilities were noted even in his youth, when he would occasionally give political speeches in his home area. During the American Civil War, Warner volunteered to serve as a private for the Union to replace his brother, Joseph Warner, who had been drafted, since Joseph had a family.

=== Early Christian life ===
Warner became a Christian in February 1865, at the age of 23. He attended Oberlin College for a short while and taught in the public schools. On Easter Sunday of 1867, Warner preached his first sermon in a Methodist Episcopal meeting using Acts 13:18 as his text.

In September of the same year, he married Tamzen Ann Kerr and in October was licensed to preach by the Winebrennerian Church of God. In May 1872, Tamzen Warner died after the birth of their still-born triplets. She had already borne a son who died at birth.

Warner was an effective evangelist in the Winebrennerian church (over 700 people responded to his altar calls during the first decade of his ministry), preaching throughout northwest Ohio and northern Indiana for about six years. He was then assigned a mission post in Nebraska for two years, a work to which he gave himself wholeheartedly, even if it meant long, lonely spells of absence from his wife, Sarah Keller, whom he had married on June 4, 1874.

=== Holiness movement ===
He returned to Ohio, and on July 7, 1877, he claimed to have experienced entire sanctification and aligned himself with the holiness movement. Earlier in his life, he had rejected the behavior of the holiness movement, writing of a certain meeting: "Nearly all blew loudly the horn of sanctification but manifested little of its fruits..." However, through the influence of his in-laws, he began to think favorably of the growing holiness movement. It would ultimately give the course of his life a new direction.

On September 15, 1877, the first charges of associating with the holiness movement were brought against him by the Winebrennerian Church of God, which were sustained shortly thereafter by a church trial. His license to preach was renewed on the condition that he would not bring "holiness" workers in to hold meetings in the Churches of God (Winebrennerian) without their consent.

On December 8 of the same year, he consecrated himself to God to be an evangelist in the growing movement. On December 13, 1877, his diary entry contains his Covenant with God: “Amen, LORD. I am yours, forever. Fill me with Your presence, now. LORD, reveal Yourself in me. At Your feet I humbly bow to receive the holy seal.”

On January 30, 1878, he was expelled from the West Ohio Eldership of the Church of God (Winebrennerian) on three counts: 1) transcending the restrictions of the Eldership 2) violating rules of cooperation, 3) participating in dividing the church. In his own eyes, Warner felt he was expelled for espousing and preaching entire sanctification. After his expulsion, he sought fellowship with various groups, including some Mennonites and the Salvation Army.

Even this time of fruitful ministry was marred by personal sorrow. His three-year-old daughter, Levilla Modest, died of meningitis in June 1878, the fifth child that Warner was forced to bury.

=== New movement ===
The Winebrennerian Church of God eventually suffered a division over the issue of membership in secret societies. Coming into contact with the side that opposed membership in these societies (Northern Indiana Eldership of the Church of God, which also was more open to holiness teachings), Warner joined with them. But not long after, in October, 1881, he separated from this group at its Eldership meeting at Beaver Dam, Indiana, when the elders rejected some proposals made by him. Five other persons "took a stand" with Warner and they formed the first congregation of the new movement.

Also in October 1881, Joseph C. and Allie R. Fisher, along with about eighteen others, separated from the Northern Michigan Eldership of the Church of God (Winebrennerian) at Carson City, Michigan, forming the second congregation. These congregations were the culmination of Warner's desire for non-sectarian Holiness congregations, of which he had dreamed since January 31, 1878, when he noted in his diary: "On the 31st of last January the Lord showed me that holiness could never prosper upon sectarian soil encumbered by human creeds and party names, and he gave me a new commission to join holiness and all truth together and build up the apostolic church of the living God. Praise His name! I will obey him."

On April 22, 1881, Warner "came out" of all holiness associations, saying, "We were positively denied membership [in any holiness association] on the ground of not adhering to any sect. And now we wish to announce to all that we wish to cooperate with all Christians, as such, in saving souls—but forever withdraw from all organisms that uphold and endorse sects and denominations in the body of Christ." "Anti-sectarianism" would become a watchword for his followers for many years afterward. His detractors would call his movement the "come-outers".

=== Personal grief ===
During 1890, Sarah Warner divorced D. S. Warner. They had lived separately since 1884. The issues surrounding their separation remain somewhat clouded, but when she filed for divorce, she claimed that Daniel was not supporting her financially. Three months after the separation, she turned over custody of Sidney, the only child of Daniel Warner to survive past childhood, to Daniel. Later, she remarried. In 1893, she died of typhoid fever at Cincinnati, Ohio. Believing it wrong to remarry as long as he had a living spouse, Daniel did not remarry until Sarah had died. A few months after her death, he was united in marriage to Frances Miller, his third and last wife.

=== Publishing ventures ===
On March 11, 1879, Warner became half owner and joint editor with I. W. Lowman of the Herald of Gospel Freedom. The following year, he was given complete charge of this publication. During 1880, D. S. Warner published his first book, Bible Proofs of the Second Work of Grace. In the minds of early Church of God leaders, this action signified the beginning of the Church of God Reformation movement. The following year, the Herald of Gospel Freedom was consolidated with The Pilgrim (published in Indianapolis, Indiana by G. Haines) to become the Gospel Trumpet. This publication would continue for many decades after his death as the official publication of the movement which was just now gaining momentum. (The Gospel Trumpet was renamed Vital Christianity in 1962 and ceased publication in 1996.)

Under Warner, the first two issues of the Gospel Trumpet were published in Rome City, Indiana. But Warner moved his printing equipment to Indianapolis early in 1881. In June 1881, G. Haines dissolved the partnership with Warner and started an opposition holiness paper. J. C. Fisher then joined D. S. Warner as partner in the Gospel Trumpet. Fisher's name disappeared from the paper's masthead in early 1887 after he divorced his wife and married a divorcee named Alice Davis.

On June 21, 1887, at the request of Warner, Enoch E. Byrum purchased Fisher's share of the Gospel Trumpet and became its publisher and business manager. Byrum would edit this paper for nearly twenty years after the death of Warner. (In several letters and editorials, Warner held out the hope that Fisher would reconcile with his ex-wife and return to the movement, but he did not.)

=== Evangelistic efforts ===
In the fall of 1884, Warner conducted revival tours and preached at camp meetings in the midwestern United States. He formed an evangelistic preaching company in the summer of 1886 with members including Nannie Kiger of Payne, Ohio; Frances Miller (his later wife) of Battle Creek, Michigan; Sarah Smith of Jerry City, Ohio; John U. Bryant and David Leininger of Beaver Dam, Indiana; and Barney E. Warren of Lacota, Michigan.

From June 1887 to April 1888, Warner conducted an evangelistic tour in Indiana, Illinois, Missouri, Kansas, and Colorado. During the same summer, he preached at camp meetings in Missouri, Indiana, Ohio, and Pennsylvania. The following winter, he conducted an evangelistic tour in Ontario, Canada.

In the winter of 1890, Warner conducted a southern evangelistic tour in Mississippi and Alabama. His evangelistic company dissolved after this tour.

During 1891, he conducted evangelistic tours in Pennsylvania and Ontario, Canada. In August 1892 to February 1893, he conducted an evangelistic tour as far as California.

=== Final years ===
In January through February 1894, Warner helped with an evangelistic tour down the Ohio River on a refloated barge known as the Floating Bethel. On December 1, 1895, Daniel Sidney Warner preached his last sermon on Sunday morning at the Gospel Trumpet Office in Grand Junction, Michigan. The topic of his sermon was Christian growth.

E. E. Byrum and his brother Noah Byrum purchased the remaining publishing business interests of Allie R. Fisher and a local lumberman named Sebastian Michels. Two days before Warner's death, he and the Byrum brothers signed papers conveying their rights to a nonprofit corporation named the Gospel Trumpet Publishing Company (now Warner Press, Inc., located in Anderson, Indiana).

Warner died on December 12, 1895, and was buried at Warner Camp in Grand Junction.

=== Personal interests ===
Warner wrote many poems and songs. Most of his song lyrics were set to music by others, chiefly Barney E. Warren. His strong admiration for the beauty of nature revealed itself in his poetry.

Warner was interested in health foods such as graham flour and he resolved to incorporate these foods into his diet. He wrote in one of his field reports to the Gospel Trumpet, "One thing we much regret that there is not more wisdom among the saints respecting healthy diet. Laboring in five counties in Ind. and two in Mich., we have not found a single family that did not have pork on their table about every meal. In fact we do not recollect a single meal without pork. Now this is a very unhealthy food ... Another great pity is the common use of white bread. O that God may keep His saints from thus wasting the precious wheat He gives us. Warner also studied and lectured occasionally on phrenology, which attempted to determine one's personality traits and acumen by measuring the size and shape of that person's head.

== Doctrines and beliefs ==
Although he did not consider himself to be a theologian as such, Warner's theology was rooted in several sources. He seems to have been an avid reader, and had friends across a broad spectrum of denominations from which he gleaned his insights. From the Wesleyan tradition he took his view of salvation. From the Winebrennerian Church of God he gained his view of the Church. From the Anabaptists, he picked up non-resistance and non-conformity, and from the Adventists he took some of his eschatology. From the Restorationist tradition, he inherited the view of restoring the Church to New Testament practice. His two prominent teachings stand out as the "one Church": all believers are members of the church of God. He taught in his booklet "What the Church of God Is and What it is Not" that the call to join various bodies must be of the Antichrist. He wrote, "Therefore the multiplicity of sects, falsely called churches, are not God’s church."

His other prominent theme was that of holiness.

The following is an overview of the main doctrines that characterized Warner's life and teachings:

- One Church called the "Church of God", which is composed of all the "saved" people; no membership list
- Holiness of life-freedom from sin; a life dedicated to the Kingdom of God and its mission. This was accomplished by a "second, definite, work of grace"; the baptism of the Holy Ghost that purified the heart of the sin nature
- Against "Babylon"; that is, all false religion that held a different name or espoused teachings outside or independent of the Word of God
- The imminent second coming of Christ. Warner said "the Lord has promised him that he should live until Jesus returned."
- Non-resistance; non-participation in the military
- Separation from "the world" in actions, beliefs, and lifestyle, which included modesty of dress without added adornment of jewelry, cosmetics, neckties, etc., and opposition to membership in secret societies
- Foot washing, baptism by immersion, and the Lord's Supper as ordinances
- Leadership led by the Holy Ghost, rather than "man-rule" that dictates what the local minister can preach, with no official ministerial training or salaries, permitting women in the ministry
- Divine healing by faith without the assistance of doctors
- Marriage as "one man-one woman" for life, with no remarriage while the first spouse remained alive. For some second marriages already consummated before conversion, the couple was left to decide for themselves if they should separate

== Movement that followed ==
Warner's reform movement eventually formalized itself into the Church of God (Anderson), with unofficial headquarters in Anderson, Indiana, and began to behave like other denominations. To this day, this group—and others who have derived from it—refers to itself as a movement rather than a denomination and does not practice formal church membership. The movement grew numerically in such a degree that it became the fastest growing denomination in the USA during the first few decades of the 20th century. This was in spite of several defections and divisions.

=== Zinzendorfism ===
The first major defection from Warner's movement occurred in the latter years of the 1890s. A large number of ministers and congregations left the movement over a disagreement on the doctrine of sanctification. This defection is generally known as "The Anti-cleansing Heresy" or Zinzendorfism by the followers of Warner. Those leaving were unable to unite into a unified group and soon were dispersed among other denominations.

=== Faith and Victory movement ===
About 1910, some concerned ministers and lay people began to speak up about "worldliness" creeping into the movement. The main issue was over the use of a neck-tie, which was considered as "outward adornment". However, the concerns were broader than this one point, and included singing "worldly songs", courtship practices, and using slang. Within a few years a small number of ministers, including C. E. Orr, Willis M. Brown, N. S. Duncan, and W. H. Shoot, began the Herald of Truth paper. Eventually, they would gather into what is now called the Church of God (Guthrie, Oklahoma), which is characterized by its conservative holiness movement standards. The Church of God (Guthrie, Oklahoma) is sometimes referred to as the "Faith and Victory" people from the periodical with that name that was published for many years in Guthrie. Some of the dissenters later returned to the main group.

=== 7th-seal movement ===
About 1940, some of the "Anderson" congregations began to express dissatisfaction with what they discerned to be "drifting" in the movement in areas such as mixed bathing between boys and girls, modesty, the entrance of the television into the home, the wearing of jewelry, and other practices that they considered to be at variance with what Daniel Warner had taught as Biblical truths. By the early 1940s, many ministers and congregations began to feel that the now existing headquarters and committees of the church were not addressing these concerns, and instead were "compromising" further the original message of Daniel Warner and the teachings of the Bible in order to gain fellowship with other denominations. Because of this, these individuals and congregations felt impressed of God to "take their stand for truth" and separate from the mainline movement.

It became the general consensus of the time that these following ministers were upset by the direction that C. E. Brown, editor of the Gospel Trumpet, was taking concerning a popular message of D. S. Warner, "Come Out of Her My People." Brown believed that there were saved people in all churches and denominations; that indeed the "Church of God" was a much larger body than Warner's movement. Brown also advocated theological training for ministers, which appeared to be a threat to those concerned with the "drift." This situation with the "7th-sealers" mirrored an earlier historical event concerning Earl Slacum and the "Watchmen Movement," which had created a schism. Slacum later felt he had erred, repented, and was restored to fellowship with the Church of God (Anderson, Indiana). The dissenting congregations and individuals, including Charles Kline, Harold Barbor, N. Bogart, H. Pittman, John R. Crouch, R. Hines, G. W. Powell, H. Littek, E. Henry, Emerson Wilson, and H. Griffin, felt that they had received more light from God concerning the original eschatology of the movement. Based on this alleged "light," these ministers began to teach that Daniel Warner had been a part of the sounding of the sixth trumpet of Revelation, but now the seventh trumpet was sounding, calling men once again from Babylon and sectarianism, which included the now allegedly apostatized Anderson movement in their view. In contrast, the majority of Warner's movement felt that the 7th-seal message was a false teaching, with some even feeling that those churches associated with it used cult-like control of the followers. Likewise, the 7th-seal churches claimed they were following the original message that Daniel Warner preached, while others adamantly proclaimed that it was not so.

Since the 1940s, the 7th-seal movement has splintered into at least 6 documented schisms.

== Influences ==
Church groups deriving from D. S. Warner's teachings:

- Church of God (Anderson, Indiana)
- Church of God (Restoration)
- Church of God (Guthrie, Oklahoma)
- Church of God (7th-seal)

Institutions named in his honor:

- Warner University formerly Warner Southern College
- Warner Pacific College
- The former Warner Memorial University in Texas.
- Warner Press
- Warner Christian Academy in South Daytona, FL
