= Breedsville, Michigan =

- Village
- Logo

- Location of Breedsville within Van Buren County, Michigan
- Coordinates: 42°21′N 86°4′W
- Country: United States
- State: Michigan
- County: Van Buren

Area
  - Total: 0.66 sq mi (1.72 km^{2})
  - Land: 0.65 sq mi (1.69 km^{2})
  - Water: 0.012 sq mi (0.03 km^{2})
- Elevation: 666 ft (203 m)

Population (2020)
  - Total: 202
  - Density: 309.6/sq mi (119.54/km^{2})
- Time zone: UTC-5 (Eastern (EST))
  - Summer (DST): UTC-4 (EDT)
- ZIP code: 49027
- Area code: 269
- FIPS code: 26-10180
- GNIS feature ID: 2397447
- Website: breedsville.org

Breedsville is a village in Van Buren County of the U.S. state of Michigan. As of the 2020 census, Breedsville had a population of 202. The village is within Columbia Township.

== History ==
Breedsville was founded around a sawmill built here by Silas Breed, who had migrated from Western New York, in 1835. It was incorporated as a village in 1883.

== Geography ==
According to the United States Census Bureau, the village has a total area of 0.66 square miles (1.71 km^{2}), of which 0.65 square miles (1.68 km^{2}) is land and 0.01 square miles (0.03 km^{2}) is water.

== Demographics ==
Historical population
Census	Pop.	Note	%±
1860	252		—
1870	255		1.2%
1880	300		17.6%
1890	212		−29.3%
1900	236		11.3%
1910	219		−7.2%
1920	140		−36.1%
1930	167		19.3%
1940	184		10.2%
1950	239		29.9%
1960	245		2.5%
1970	209		−14.7%
1980	244		16.7%
1990	213		−12.7%
2000	235		10.3%
2010	199		−15.3%
2020	202		1.5%
U.S. Decennial Census

=== 2010 census ===
As of the census of 2010, there were 199 people, 65 households, and 47 families residing in the village. The population density was 306.2 inhabitants per square mile (118.2/km^{2}). There were 80 housing units at an average density of 123.1 per square mile (47.5/km^{2}). The racial makeup of the village was 73.9% White, 2.0% African American, 3.0% Native American, 18.6% from other races, and 2.5% from two or more races. Hispanic or Latino of any race were 28.1% of the population.

There were 65 households, of which 35.4% had children under the age of 18 living with them, 55.4% were married couples living together, 15.4% had a female householder with no husband present, 1.5% had a male householder with no wife present, and 27.7% were non-families. 24.6% of all households were made up of individuals, and 4.6% had someone living alone who was 65 years of age or older. The average household size was 3.06 and the average family size was 3.55.

The median age in the village was 34.5 years. 25.6% of residents were under the age of 18; 11.9% were between the ages of 18 and 24; 20% were from 25 to 44; 35.2% were from 45 to 64; and 7% were 65 years of age or older. The gender makeup of the village was 51.8% male and 48.2% female.

=== 2000 census ===
As of the census of 2000, there were 235 people, 73 households, and 58 families residing in the village. The population density was 350.7 inhabitants per square mile (135.4/km^{2}). There were 85 housing units at an average density of 126.9 per square mile (49.0/km^{2}). The racial makeup of the village was 82.55% White, 3.40% African American, 4.68% Native American, 8.94% from other races, and 0.43% from two or more races. Hispanic or Latino of any race were 12.77% of the population.

There were 73 households, out of which 39.7% had children under the age of 18 living with them, 60.3% were married couples living together, 12.3% had a female householder with no husband present, and 19.2% were non-families. 16.4% of all households were made up of individuals, and 4.1% had someone living alone who was 65 years of age or older. The average household size was 3.22 and the average family size was 3.53.

In the village, the population was spread out, with 31.9% under the age of 18, 10.2% from 18 to 24, 28.5% from 25 to 44, 20.0% from 45 to 64, and 9.4% who were 65 years of age or older. The median age was 32 years. For every 100 females, there were 94.2 males. For every 100 females age 18 and over, there were 95.1 males.

The median income for a household in the village was $32,917, and the median income for a family was $34,000. Males had a median income of $31,250 versus $17,917 for females. The per capita income for the village was $11,741. About 15.6% of families and 28.0% of the population were below the poverty line, including 45.9% of those under the age of eighteen and 26.1% of those 65 or over.
