= Floating Bethel =

Photograph of the Floating Bethel

The Floating Bethel was a river going vessel that planted churches and served as a platform for the missionary work of Rev. George T. Clayton, his wife Lizzie, B.F. Roe and Herbert M. Riggle in the early Church of God movement during the 1890s.

== Origins ==
The Bethel was an unpowered barge; described also as a "converted rolling mill paddler", that was converted to a three hundred seat chapel. It operated in the northern Ohio Valley starting in the fall of 1893. Clayton bought a sunken barge and for several years conducted evangelistic work on the Ohio river. The evangelists that worked on the barge were representatives of the Church of God (Anderson, Indiana). The barge was paid for by Riggle who used his inheritance to start the project. Riggle worked on the project for a time until one of his children nearly fell into the river. There was no financial collection made during the services held during this ministry; volunteers paid for the expenses. The mission was planned to last for five years with stops planned for various lengths.

== Description ==
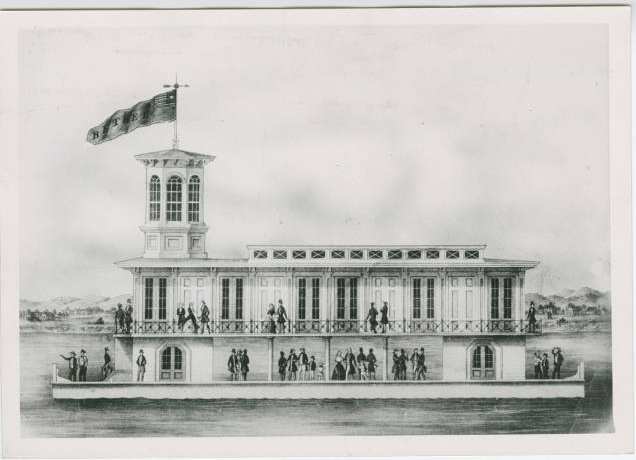
A highly idealized rendering of the Floating Bethel.

Its form was described by Lucy S. Furman in The Century Magazine, December 1894:

The Floatin' Bethel was made this way. There was two stories. The lower one was one long room, like a church, with the pulpit at one end, and benches set in rows all the way back, and big doors openin' out on both sides, so 's the gang-planks could be laid right to 'em for the people to get in easy, and the devil would n't have any room to talk about religious folks holdin' theirselves so up and above others. The top story had a hall down the middle, and sleepin'-rooms on each side. We eat in the hall, and had one of the little rooms for a cook-room. Then there was a real nice little steeple on top.

== Destruction ==
The Floating Bethel burned down before it got out of the Ohio River. It caught fire and was completely destroyed in 1898 or 1899 according to different sources, yet timbers were salvaged from the wreck and were used in the construction of two homes in the Park View section of Moundsville. Both of these homes are in good condition and occupied.

== Partial list of locations where evangelistic work was performed ==
- Moundsville
- Rush Run
- Martins Ferry
- Wellsburg
- East Liverpool
- Steubenville

Over forty congregations of the Church of God were started along its route.

== See also ==
D.S. Warner
