= Artur Pawlowski =

Polish-Canadian evangelical street preacher

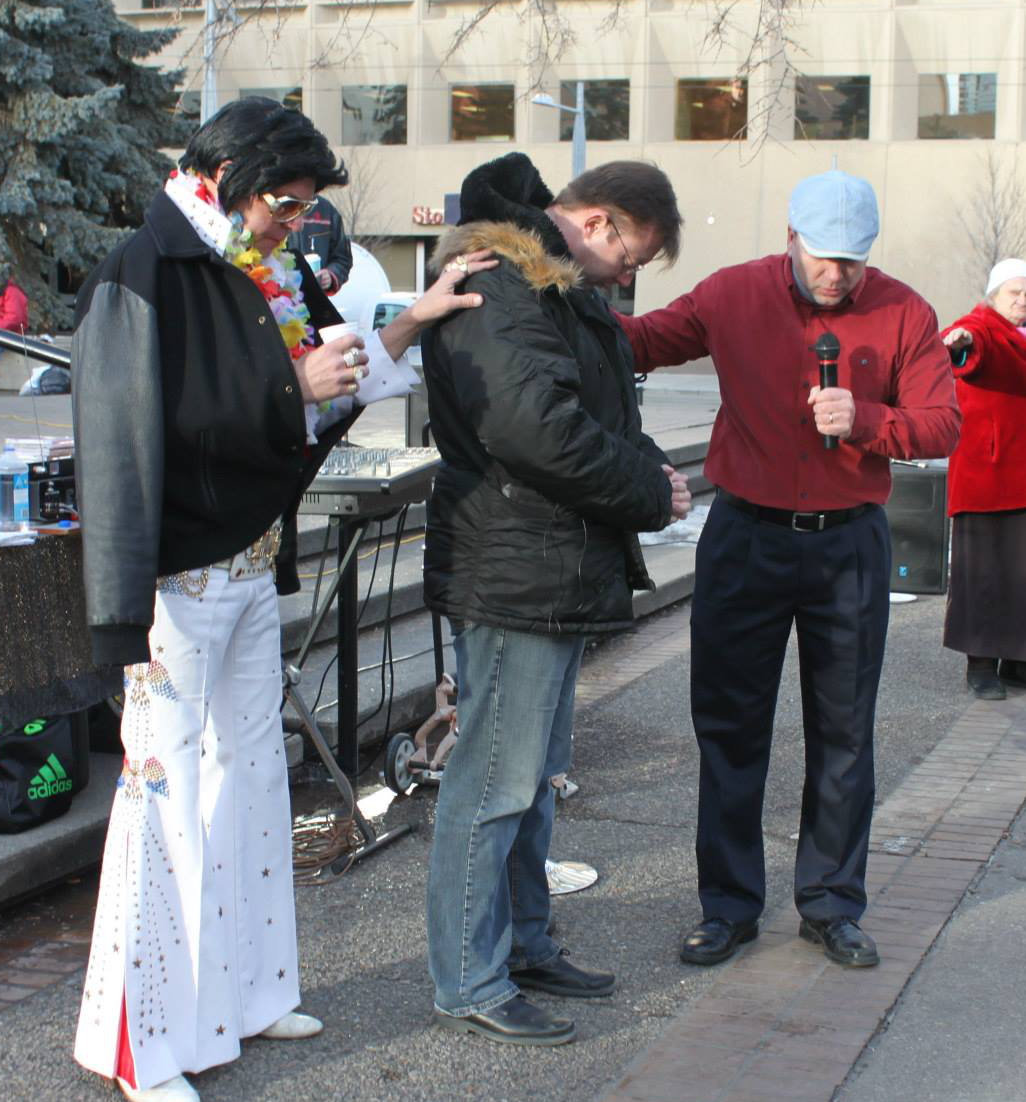
- Pawlowski (right), Calgary, 2014

Leader of the Solidarity Movement of Alberta
- Incumbent
- Assumed office May 8, 2023

Leader of the Independence Party of Alberta
- In office September 10, 2022 – March 28, 2023
- Preceded by: Victory Bayford
- Succeeded by: Katherine Kowalchuk

Personal details
- Born: March 28, 1973 (age 53) Kożuchów, Poland
- Citizenship: Canada (since 2004)
- Party: Solidarity Movement of Alberta (since 2023)
- Other political affiliations: Independence Party of Alberta (2022–2023)
- Children: 3
- Occupation: Street pastor
- Known for: Defiance of COVID-19 public health rules Anti-abortion and anti-homosexuality rhetoric

Artur Pawlowski (born March 28, 1973) is a Polish-Canadian evangelical street preacher and political activist. He is pastor of the Cave of Adullam congregation in Calgary and previously led the Kings Glory Fellowship (KGF). Pawlowski is also founder and pastor of Street Church Ministries (SCM), a group no longer recognized as a religious or charitable organization by the Canadian government.

== Early life and emigration ==
Pawlowski was born on March 28, 1973, in Kożuchów, Poland. By 1990, he was living in Greece with his family. He emigrated to Canada in 1995 and became a Canadian citizen on February 2, 2004.

== Career ==
Pawlowski is a Protestant street preacher, founder and pastor of Street Church Ministries, and a pastor of Kings Glory Fellowship. In January 2010, the Canada Revenue Agency revoked the charitable status of Pawlowski's Kings Glory Fellowship, citing a lack of financial transparency and deeming the organization to be exceeding the CRA's cutoff for how much time charitable organizations can devote to “non-partisan political activities". Lack of clarity on how the organization spent its money was also cited as a reason for its charitable status being revoked. By 2021, Pawlowski was pastor of The Cave of Adullam congregation in Calgary and of the Street Church Ministries.

Pawlowski was accused of several City of Calgary bylaw infractions which were struck down in December 2019 by the provincial court.

In 2012, for his support of Israel, he received the Honorary Chaplain Position for the Province of Alberta from the Christian Friends of Canadian Magen David Adom (CFMDA). In 2011 Bishop Dr. Gerry Kibarabara, the secretary general of United Christian Churches of Kenya's Supreme Council, presented Pawlowski with honorary ordination for his humanitarian work in Africa. He is the first to hold such a position for the province of Alberta. On April 28, 2012, the Progressive Group for Independent Business (PGIB), a membership-funded conservative business group in Canada, awarded Pawlowski the 'Free Speech Award'.

As of October 2013, Pawlowski continued to hold "prayer meetings inside the Calgary City Hall's main atrium despite eight years of legal issues including "several court cases, hundreds of bylaw tickets and trespassing notices.".

In 2014, Pawlowski was fined for his attempt to participate in the 2012 Calgary Stampede parade with his followers without official permission.

In 2015, Pawlowski appeared at a press conference with a member of his congregation along with a Calgary Transit bus driver who had been fired for refusing to drive Calgary's pride-themed rainbow bus. The bus driver said he was fired for being Christian.

In September 2022, Pawlowski became the leader of the Independence Party of Alberta. He was removed as leader six months later.

In early 2023, he formed a new political party, the Solidarity Movement of Alberta. On May 8, it became a registered party with Elections Alberta.

== Views ==
Pawlowski opposes abortion and homosexuality. In 2014, Pawlowski endorsed Ric McIver's leadership bid of the Progressive Conservative Party of Alberta. A campaign photo featuring McIver and Pawlowski with a message condemning homosexuality was on display at Pawlowski's Street Church. Pawlowski stated that the 2013 Alberta floods were caused by God's vengeance over LGBTQ+ Albertans.

== Activities during the COVID-19 pandemic ==
In December 2020, Pawlowski was fined for failing to wear a mask and failing to have a permit for an anti-mask demonstration held in late November 2020.

In February 2021, Pawlowski marched in and led an anti-lockdown rally in Downtown Calgary while holding a tiki torch during the daytime.

During Easter 2021, Calgary Police were called to Pawlowski's congregation over reports that Pawlowski and his church were not following COVID-19 public health orders. Pawlowski compared the Calgary Police and an AHS Public Health Inspector to the Nazis and the Gestapo and demanded they leave the congregation. The police left without taking any enforcement action. Later, Pawlowski was arrested by the Calgary Police Service and charged for organizing, promoting and attending an illegal in-person gathering that violated evidence-based public health orders. Pawlowski was found guilty on June 28.

On September 27, 2021, after returning from COVID-19 themed events in the United States to Canada, Pawlowski was arrested by the Canada Border Services Agency at Calgary International Airport, before being released later the same day. He was being charged with disobeying a court order and failing to wear a mask.

On October 13, he was sentenced for his earlier CPHO conviction, receiving a $23,000 fine and 18 months of probation. His probation conditions include being ordered to obey public health orders, to remain in Alberta, and to explain whenever they speak publicly that their views are contrary to public health experts and scientific consensus. He was also required to pay Alberta Health Services' estimated $20,000 legal costs.

Justice Adam Germain ordered Pawlowski and his brother to add a disclaimer to any public statements criticizing COVID-19 public health measures stating that their views were "contradicted by the majority of scientific opinion." Pawlowski appealed the ruling on Charter grounds, claiming that the order violated their right to free speech. On 25 November 2021, Justice Jo-Anne Strekaf of the Alberta Court of Appeal countermanded the ruling until the case was heard on its full merits on 14 June 2022. Both Fox News and the National Post called the Germain ruling a "compelled speech order". The Alberta Court of Appeals subsequently suspended the sanctions due to AHS procedural issues, and considered the 3 days in prison and 10 months of probation served, as well as a $10,000 fine, as suitable punishments for the offences committed in violation of public health orders.

On 2 January 2022, Pawlowski was arrested on Crowchild Trail and "charged with one count of breaching a judge's order that restrained [Pawlowski] from attending any illegal public gathering". Authorities "confirmed a protest took place at Health Minister Jason Copping’s home on Saturday afternoon". The bail judge imposed "conditions that [Pawlowski has] no contact with Copping and [does] not attend his residence" while he waited for a trial on the merits.

Pawlowski was arrested on 7 February 2022 at the Coutts, Alberta border crossing blockade after encouraging protesters to back out of an agreement they had made with RCMP to leave the area. The protesters were demanding the lifting of vaccine mandates for cross-border truckers, as well as the lifting of other pandemic-related public health restrictions. Pawlowski gave a speech to protesters in Coutts a week earlier, saying that "for freedom to be preserved, people must be willing to sacrifice their lives. This is our time." He was charged with mischief over $5,000 and interrupting the operation of essential infrastructure under Alberta's Critical Infrastructure Defence Act.

On 16 February, Alberta Provincial Court Judge Erin Olsen denied bail for Pawlowski, saying "there is a substantial likelihood that the accused will, if released from custody, continue on offending." Olsen also clarified that inciting others to criminal activity would not be protected by the right to free speech in the Charter of Rights and Freedoms.

After Pawlowski's lawyers submitted a release plan to the court, Justice Gaylene Kendall overturned Olsen's ruling on 25 March and granted release conditions. Pawlowski was ordered to pay a $25,000 cash deposit, put under curfew and forbidden from attending protests, and the court required sureties from Pawlowski's wife and son. Pawlowski remained in custody pending a bail hearing on earlier charges, but was released on 30 March. In late July 2022, the Alberta Court of Appeal recognized procedural issues around how the public health order was applied and acknowledged that the time he had already served were sufficient punishments for ignoring public health orders, thus returning some of the fines that Pawlowski has paid.

In February 2023, Pawlowski was on trial at Lethbridge Court and pled not guilty to charges of mischief, breaching a release order, and damaging or destroying essential infrastructure during the Canada convoy protest at Coutts. The charges partly relate to a speech that Pawlowski delivered on February 3, 2022 which encouraged protestors to defy police orders to clear the area. On 2 May 2023, he was found guilty of mischief and violating his release conditions. Justice Gordon Krinke did not make a ruling on the charge of breaching the Critical Infrastructure Defence Act due to a constitutional challenge submitted by Pawlowski's lawyer.

== Electoral record ==
2023 Alberta general election: Calgary-Elbow
Party	Candidate	Votes	%	±%
New Democratic	Samir Kayande	12,189	49.01	+25.54
United Conservative	Chris Davis	11,446	46.02	+1.68
Alberta Party	Kerry Cundal	1,136	4.57	-25.97
Solidarity Movement	Artur Pawlowski	99	0.40	–
Total		24,870	99.12	–
Rejected and declined		220	0.88	
Turnout		25,090	68.77	
Eligible voters		36,483		
New Democratic gain from United Conservative		Swing		+11.93
Source(s) Source: Elections Alberta

== See also ==
- Tobias Tissen
