= Kalamazoo River Valley Trail =

Trail in Kalamazoo County, Michigan, United States

Coordinates: 42.3224°N 85.5767°W

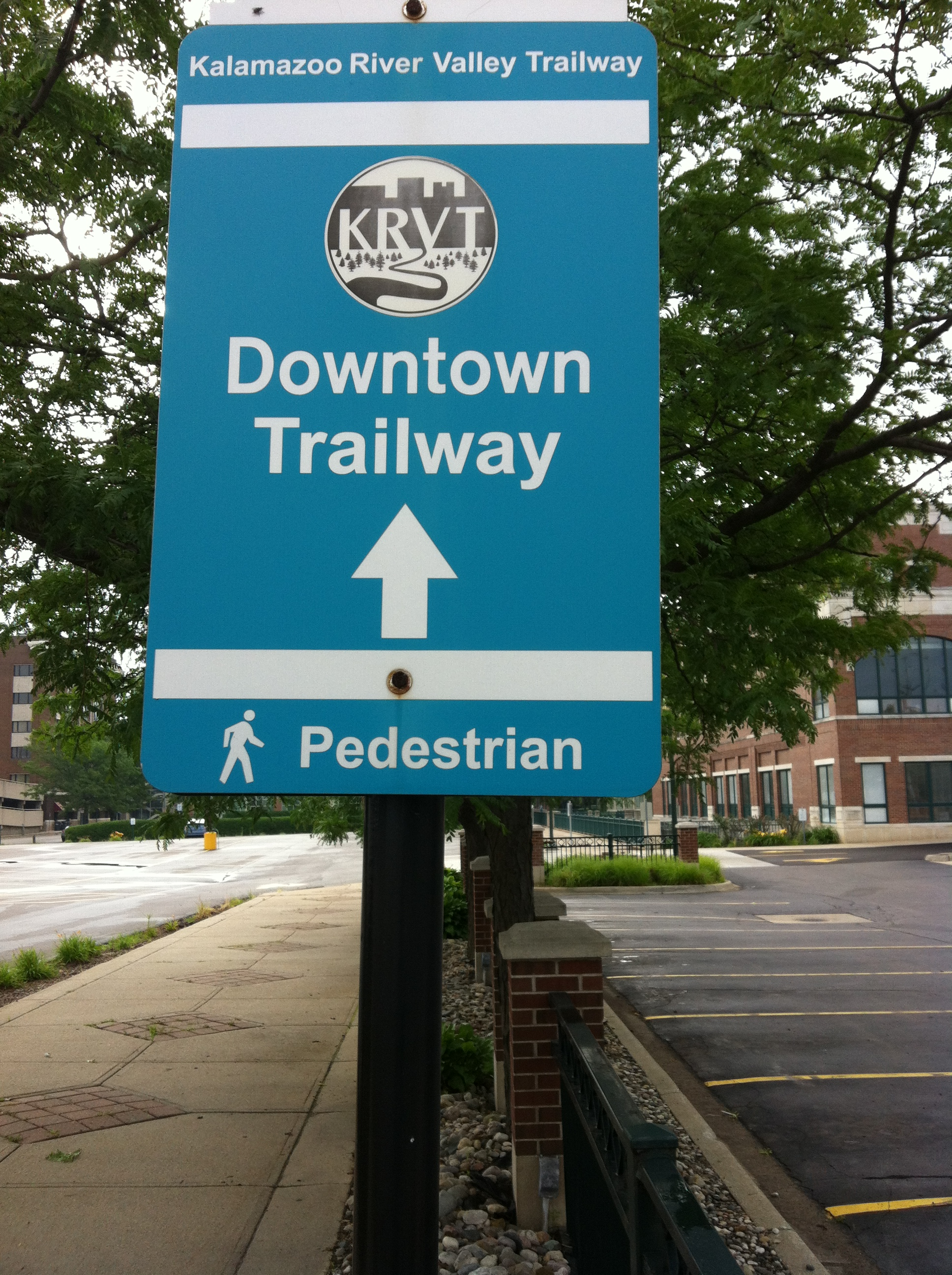
- Kalamazoo River Valley Trailway Downtown Trailway Sign
- Length: 22 miles
- Location: Kalamazoo County, Michigan
- Established: 1991
- Trailheads: Kalamazoo Nature Center, Kal-Haven Trail
- Use: Hiking, Biking, Walking, Commuting
- Difficulty: Easy
- Surface: Paved-asphalt
- Website: www.parksfoundationkalamazoo.com

The Kalamazoo River Valley Trail is a planned-to-be 35-mile non-motorized trail in Kalamazoo County, Michigan. It currently sits at 22 miles. A master plan for the Trail was completed and portions of the trail are finished and open to the public. A community campaign to raise $5.9 million, to be combined with committed government funds, is underway to secure the remaining dollars needed to finish the trail.

== History ==
The roots of the Kalamazoo River Valley Trail go back to the founding of two partner organizations—The Parks Foundation of Kalamazoo County and The Friends of the Kalamazoo River Valley Trailway. In 1982 a group of citizens wanted to protect parkland at the former Morris Markin estate in northern Kalamazoo County and develop a recreational destination. The group created the Parks Foundation of Kalamazoo County and formed a partnership with the county to develop and protect park lands. Volunteers and donors raised more than $6 million to develop, protect and maintain Markin Glen Park.

In 1980 Kalamazoo leaders gathered to develop a plan for enriching the quality of life in the community. From this planning effort, The Kalamazoo Forum was created to tackle large-scale community issues, such as restoring the viability of the Kalamazoo River. Citizens, with assistance from The Forum, envisioned a non-motorized trail that would connect these communities and bring residents closer to the river. The Friends of the Kalamazoo River Valley Trailway was created to focus resources on completing a master plan for the trail. In 1996 a demonstration trail was completed at Mayors' Riverfront Park in Kalamazoo. The City of Kalamazoo added trail sections around downtown.

In 2000 Kalamazoo County agreed to manage and operate the proposed trail as a county park. The next phase of the Kalamazoo River Valley Trail was opened in September 2008. This 4.8 mile section runs from 10th Street at the head of the Kal-Haven Trail to Westnedge Avenue.

== Upcoming trail segments ==
During 2009 the trail segment from Rose Park in Kalamazoo to Mosel avenue was completed. This section includes a 14 ft. wide bridge over the Kalamazoo River at Paterson Street. In 2010, construction began on a 5-mile section from Mosel Avenue to D Avenue. This segment of trail goes through Markin Glen Park and the Kalamazoo Nature Center. Following completion of this section, the county completed a section running from Mayors' Riverfront Park to Sprinkle Avenue (1.7 miles) and from Sprinkle Avenue to 35th Street (5.5 miles) in Galesburg. After that work from 35th Street to Battle Creek (9.5 miles) and from Michigan Avenue to Kilgore Road (4 miles) will be finished. The Kalamazoo River Valley Trail will link Battle Creek to the Kal-Haven Trail from east to west and D Avenue to the City of Portage from north to south.

== Funding ==
Kalamazoo County and the Parks Foundation are partners in securing the $18.6 million needed to complete the entire Kalamazoo River Valley Trail. During Phase I of a fund raising campaign, which secured funds for the Kalamazoo to Kal-Haven segment and the Kalamazoo to Parchment segment, $2.8 million was raised in charitable funds from the community. Another $2.4 million was secured in Michigan Department of Transportation (MDOT) funds and $468,100 from local governments.

The Parks Foundation is now raising charitable gifts for Phase II of the campaign to complete all remaining trail sections. The goals for this phase are $5.9 million in charitable contributions from the community, $5.5 million in MDOT investment, and $1.5 million. in local government commitments. These goals include an endowment fund corpus of $2,000,000 for future trail maintenance.
