= Henry Hildebrandt =

Mexican-Canadian religious leader

Pastor Henry Hildebrandt
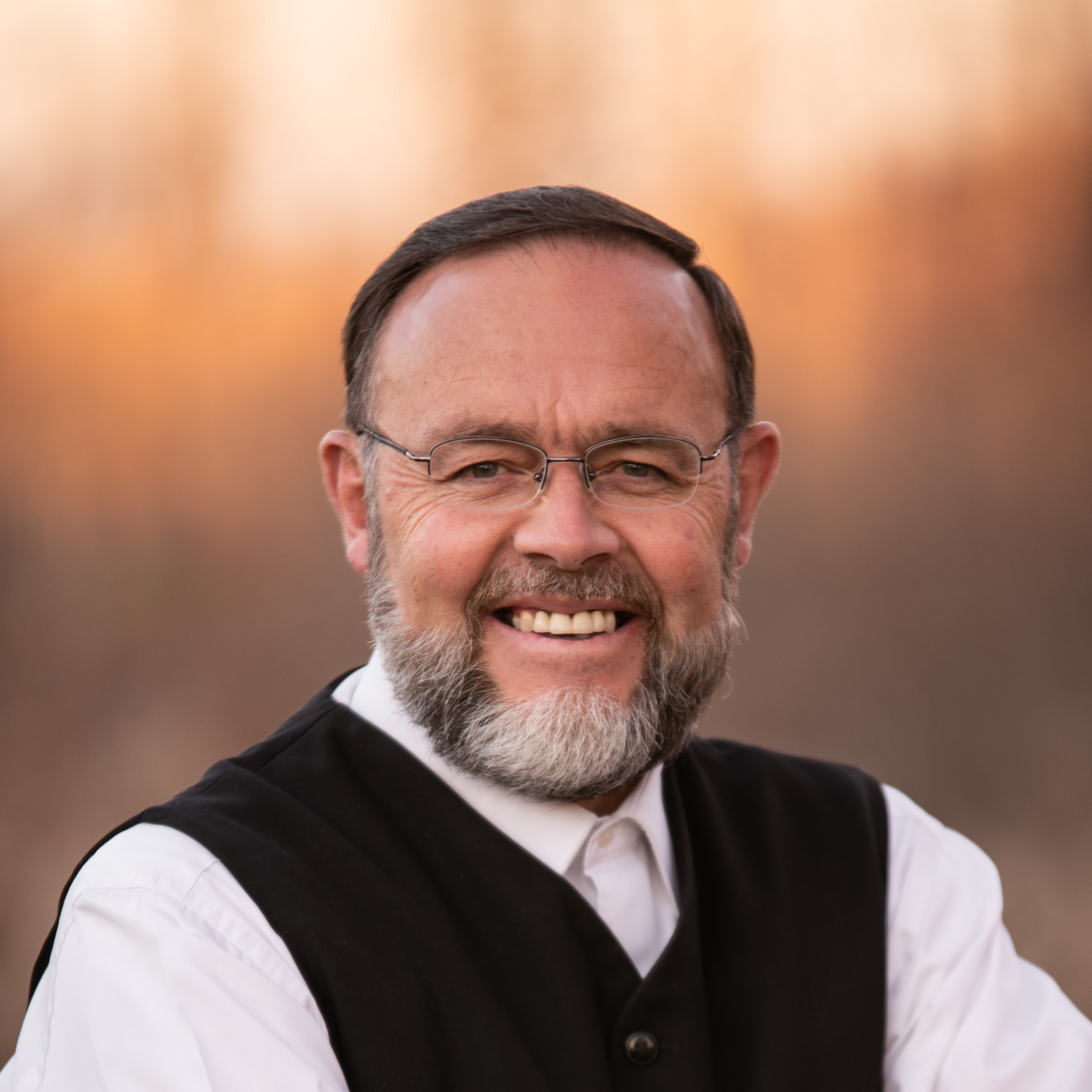
- Pastor Henry Hildebrandt of the Church of God in Aylmer, 2021.
- Born: 1963 (age 62–63)
- Known for: COVID-19 misinformation, Anti Lockdown Activism, COVID-19 denialism, Anti Vaccine Activism.
- Website: https://henryhildebrandt.com/

Heinrich (Henry) Hildebrandt (born 1963) is a Mexican-Canadian religious leader, activist, and conspiracy theorist. In 1991, Hildebrandt became pastor of a fundamentalist Church of God (Restoration) congregation in Aylmer, Ontario, a group described by former members as "controlling" and "cult-like". Hildebrandt also has the title of Apostle in the global presbytery of the Church of God (Restoration). In, what some suggest, is an effort to fulfill church prophesy and attract new members, Hildebrandt became an outspoken critic of COVID-19 restrictions and led his congregation in defying restrictions on gatherings since April 2020, which he alleges is a government conspiracy to destroy the true Christian church.

== Early life ==
Hildebrandt is a former Mennonite who was born in 1963 to a Plautdiesch-speaking family, near Cuauahtemoc, Chihuahua, Mexico. At a young age, Hildebrandt left the Mennonite church to join the German Church of God. Hildebrandt immigrated to Canada in 1985 and became a Canadian citizen in 1989. Soon thereafter he joined the Church of God (Restoration) and quickly became a leader.

== Child abuse controversy ==
In 2001, Hildebrandt and his congregation were thrust into the national limelight due to a clash between a family in the congregation and the local Children's Aid Society over the physical discipline of children. Several children were seized from a home among Hildebrandt's congregation, as they were disciplining their children using straps and sticks. Also of concern for child welfare authorities was that the church prohibited families from taking sick children to medical doctors. Hildebrandt defended the family, claiming their discipline methods were advocated by his church, were based on their "biblically-held convictions", and did not constitute abuse. Following the incident, more than 100 members of his congregation fled to the United States and Mexico over fears the government would "restrict their freedoms" to hit their children using straps and sticks. Hildebrandt was criminally charged after he "publicly identified a child who is part of a child welfare proceeding", which is illegal in Ontario.

== Anti-COVID-19 restrictions activism ==
In April 2020 during the COVI9-19 pandemic, Hildebrandt held drive-in services at his church, despite strict gathering limits mandated by the province of Ontario. No charges were laid and after several weeks the Ontario government relented and modified the regulations to allow for such gatherings.

After holding multiple indoor church services in defiance of Ontario government mandates in January and February 2021, Hildebrandt and his congregation were ordered by the Superior Court of Justice to abide by all COVID-19 restrictions mandated by the government of Ontario.

On 14 May 2021, he and the congregation were found in contempt of court and Justice Bruce Thomas ordered the doors of the church be locked and fines of $117,000 were issued. In response, Hildebrandt's church and the Trinity Bible Chapel based in the Waterloo region, brought a constitutional challenge arguing that Covid public health measures interfered with their religious freedom. In March 2022, Ontario Superior Court Justice Renee Pomerance ruled against Hildebrandt, finding that public health measures were “reasonably and demonstrably justified” given the unprecedented public health crisis. Hildebrandt appealed this judgement but The Ontario Court of Appeal ruled in favour of the lower court. Hildebrandt again appealed the Court of Appeal's ruling. In August 2023, the Supreme Court of Canada declined to hear Hildebrandt's appeal. As a result, the outstanding charges faced by Hildebrandt and his church have been re-activated.

In February 2022, Hildebrandt became an outspoken supporter of the Freedom Convoy in Ottawa. He led bilingual worship services in front of the Parliament Buildings along with a pastor from Montreal during the convoy's presence in Ottawa and confronted police with his religious message.

In August 2022, Hildebrandt's son Herbert Hildebrandt was found guilty of assaulting an 82-year-old man during a pandemic-related confrontation outside the church in 2021.

In August 2023, Hildebrandt pled guilty to one count of violation of pandemic restrictions, as part of a plea deal. All other Covid-related charges against him were dropped, and he agreed to pay a fine of $52,000.
