= Kal-Haven Trail =

33.5 mile park trail between Kalamazoo, Michigan to South Haven, Michigan

Kal-Haven Trail Sesquicentennial State Park
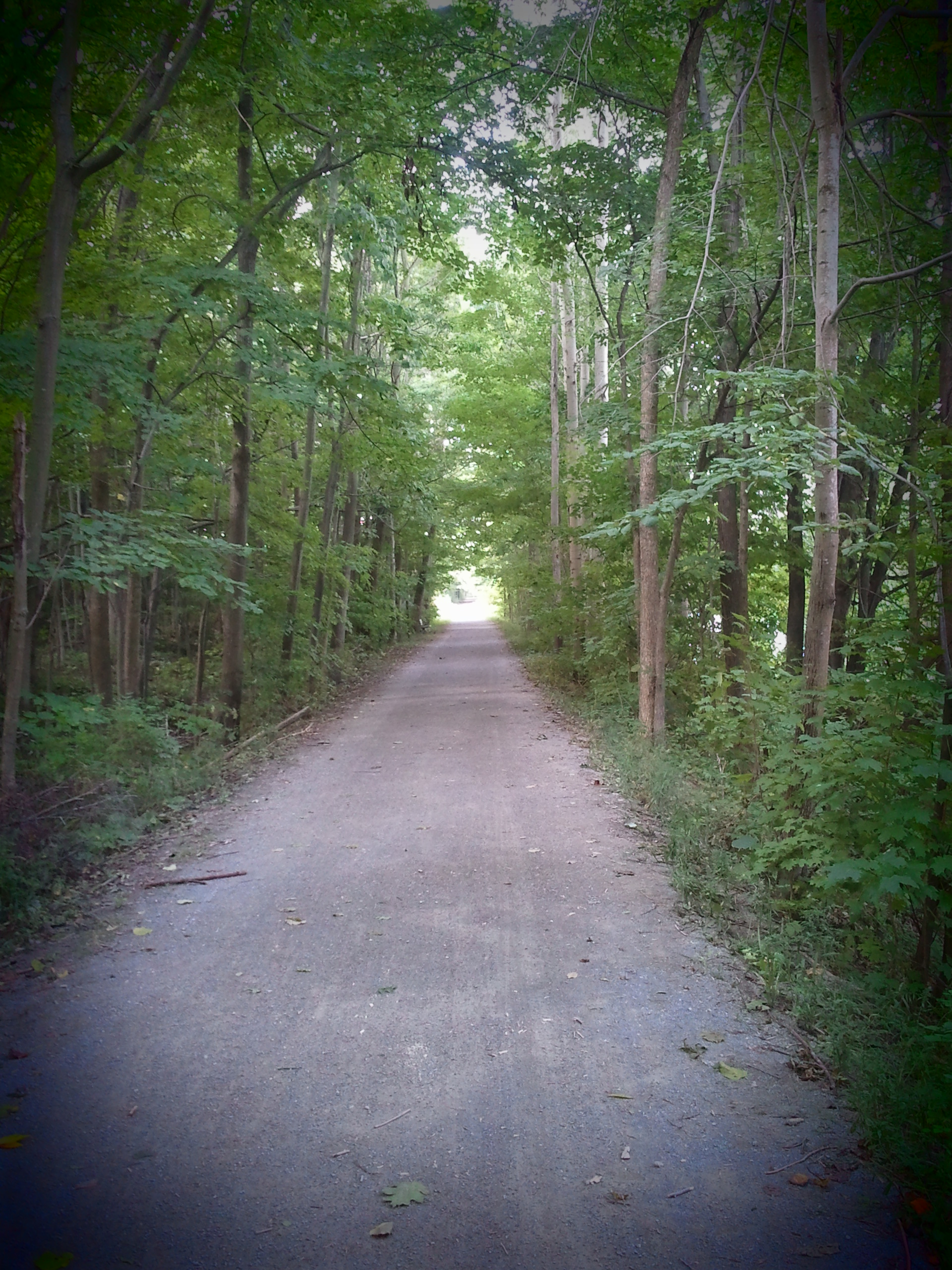
- Length: 34.5 miles (56 km)
- Location: Kalamazoo County, Van Buren County, Lower Peninsula, Michigan, United States
- Established: 1988
- Trailheads: Kalamazoo, Michigan; Alamo, Michigan; Bloomingdale, Michigan; Grand Junction, Michigan; South Haven, Michigan
- Use: Cycling, Equestrian, Hiking, Snow-mobiling, XC skiing
- Difficulty: Easy
- Season: All
- Maintained by: Michigan Department of Natural Resources
- Website: Official site

Trail map
- Location within the state of Michigan

The Kal-Haven Trail, formally known as the Kal-Haven Trail Sesquicentennial State Park, is a rail trail in the US that originally ran 33.5 miles (53.9 km) between South Haven, Michigan, to a point just west of the city of Kalamazoo, Michigan, where there is a trailhead. In 2008, the trail was extended east from the trailhead to downtown Kalamazoo as part of the Kalamazoo River Valley Trail.

== Description ==
The Michigan Department of Natural Resources (DNR) and Pure Michigan designated the Kal-Haven trail as one of the "Pure Michigan" trails because it "provide[s] access to high quality scenic views.

The Kal-Haven trail is a former railroad bed that has been converted to trail using Limestone/slag surface.

== Location ==
Most of the trail is in Van Buren County and that county operates it between the trailhead and South Haven, including the parts within Kalamazoo County. The Van Buren-controlled portion previously required a trail pass, but as of 2011, the usage fee was dropped.

The Kal-Haven Trail runs along the former route of the Kalamazoo and South Haven Railroad, as does a section of the Kalamazoo River Valley Trail. It traverses wooded areas, farmland and small towns. It is primarily used by hikers and bicyclists in the summer, and by snowmobilers in the winter. The trail is surfaced with crushed limestone. Horseback riding was allowed on an 11-mile section adjacent to the trail. The starting point for riding was at 67th street and Baseline road. Due to lack of use the horse trail has been left to nature and is no longer a part of the trail.

Currently, the trail passes through the following locations, from east to west:

- Alamo, Michigan
- Mentha, Michigan
- Kendall, Michigan
- Pine Grove Mills, Michigan
- Gobles, Michigan
- Bloomingdale, Michigan
- Berlamont, Michigan
- Grand Junction, Michigan
- Lacota, Michigan
- Kibbe, Michigan
- South Haven, Michigan

== History ==
In 1870 the Kalamazoo-South Haven Railroad was built to transport mostly lumber. The railroad operated between Kalamazoo and South Haven for just over 100 years spanning from 1870-1973 when the line was abandoned.

The Kal-Haven Trail State Park was slated to be dedicated October of 1976; the trail was to run along the abandoned Penn Central Railroad route from Kalamazoo to South Haven. The 1976 opening dedication was not to happen. The trail was to be a pilot project that was modeled off other trails that had been done in Wisconsin and Illinois.

The first proposal for the Kal-Haven trail was not welcomed by all local government officials. A supervisor of Alamo township claimed to have a "bad premonition" of the proposed project. One of the main concerns is the responsibility for patrolling and controlling the trail to respect the private property owners rights bordering the small 100 foot wide park. A public meeting was held in August 1976 to discuss the pros and cons of the proposed park; issues to be discussed were concerns over possible problems like law enforcement, litter, and trespassing onto private property. After a public meeting, the public reaction was reported to be about 50–50 with most objections coming from land owners that owned land nearby.

After years of dangling the trail before the citizens of between South Haven and Kalamazoo, the Kal-Haven Trail Association was formed and a public meeting was scheduled. The hope of the Kal-Haven was labeled 'Dormant Monster' in 1984 with the trail being called an ill-conceived plan that would have included "such evils as rampant theft, vandalism, littering and drug and alcohol abuse." However, these views were in the minority at the time and a poll taken at the time found that 80% of people were in support but the vocal minority had disproportionate influence in opposition. In what looked to be another nail in the coffin of the proposed Kal-Haven trail, Bloomingdale Township voted against the trail in 1984.

The Kal-Haven Trail Association was met with opposition by Property Owners United, a Citizens group that was against the trails creation. In November 1984, a public meeting was held that had over 100 people attending to discuss the trail. At the meeting one local resident expressed concerns that they had already experienced an invasion of privacy by people already using the abandoned rail line. Pine Grove Township passed a resolution against the trail stating "[the] state has made no declaration or commitments to assure safety and tranquility of property owners, and has made no assurances for safety and welfare of users of the park."

The Columbia Township board voted in November 1984 opposing the proposed trail.

The Michigan Department of Natural Resources (DNR) worked with the Michigan Department of Transportation (M-DOT) on the development of the trail. To build the trail MDOT had to acquire the abandoned rail bed which was 498 acres of land spread over 200 different parcels of real estate. The park was built as the first "linear park" in Michigan. To acquire the land from Penn Central would take approval from the Federal Bankruptcy court because in 1970 the company went into bankruptcy and eight years later the court was still dealing with liquidating Penn Central's assets including real estate holdings which included the Kal-Haven Rail bed. In 1987, the Natural Resource Commission voted to buy the 36 1/2 miles from the Penn Central Corp for $428,750 with the Penn Central Board of Directors giving an unofficial approval.

In November 1987, Property Owners United wrote a letter to the editor of The Herald-Palladium laying out 11 areas of concern: invasion of privacy, wasteful use of tax money for the benefit of a few, crime on the trail (thievery, vandalism, illicit sex, drug use, etc.), cost would be "astronomical", incompatibility of the proposals (how can hikers, bikers, horses, and snowmobiles all use the same path), loss of tax money being paid by Penn Central for property tax, declining property value, and alleged violation of the Public Act No. 116 of 1974 of preserving farm land.

On January 13, 1988, a ceremony was held at the Bloomingdale Depot Museum where the State of Michigan handed a check for $428,750 to a representative of Penn Central Corp. The site was chosen as it was the midway point in the trail, and the Friends of the Kal-Haven Trail presented a golden spike symbolizing the completion of the sale to the DNR chief administrative officer.

The DNR added four additional parcels of land to totaling 35 more acres to the trail; all of the parcels were tax revered land in Van Buren County.

=== Bridge Ownership Dispute ===
In 1987, a historic "humpback" wooden bridge in Pine grove township was slated to be taken down and removed from County Road 653. Local residents started a protest after the contract was awarded for demolition of the bridge. The cost to replace the bridge was going to be only $40,000 but the cost to repair would have been $100,000. The historic humpback bridge was built in the 1800s which was built to have CR-653 cross the Penn Central Rail line. The bridge was closed because the deck was unsafe to carry traffic. 425 citizens signed a petition asking that the bridge be spared. The county was going to pay $1,500 to have the bridge demolished, but voted to pay an additional $4,500 to have the bridge disassembled. A group was formed called Save the Bridge Fund.

During the building of the Kal-Haven trail, the DNR contacted the Van Buren County Road Commission to ask about the bridge; hearing no objection, they started to almost completely reconstruct the old bridge for use on the trail. The group Pine Grove Association was asked if they had any objection to relocating the bridge; not hearing back, the DNR began reconstruction in September. It was determined after the group asked the DNR to stop work that the Association and not the county owned the bridge. The Association had objection to the bridge being moved out of Pine Grove. One main objection the group had was DNR's plan to change the bridge from a width of 22 feet down to just 14 feet. The County Road commission took the stance that the rights to the timber were awarded to the contractor who took the bridge apart. The contractor then sold the bridge to the association. For a short period of time, the partially rebuilt bridge was known as the 'bridge to nowhere' while the dispute was ongoing.

=== Opening of the Kal-Haven Trail ===
The trail was projected to open in May, but the opining was delayed because Property Owners United sought a court injunction to stop the opening of the trail. On May 3, 1989, the group filed their lawsuit against the DNR. During settlement talks between the DNR and property owners, fencing was agreed to and delay of the grand opening till labor day the injunction was lifted for the trail to open August 15, 1989. The project that was supposed to open in 1976 and had spent years being debated was opened in 1989 without any fanfare or ceremony. This opening marks the first linear park opening in the state of Michigan.

== Funding ==
The cost to acquire all the land in 1976 was estimated at $300,000 and to build the original 8-foot-wide asphalt pathway was an estimated $1,330,000. The Federal Government agreed to pay half the cost of the Kal-Haven trail via grant for $1,012,500 with matching funds provided by the state of Michigan.

In 1981, Michigan State Senator Edgar Fredricks proposed a bill earmarking $8.2 million for the trail; the money earmarked came from a sum of $22 million paid to the state from Penn Central as back taxes owed. However, because of state budget problems, the money proposed from this fund was moved to the state's general fund and many people assumed the trail was done for.

The cost for the acquiring the land and developing it in 1984 was estimated to cost $2.7 million with about $30,000 needed annually to operate and maintain the trail for public use. The Michigan Land Trust Board was created from oil and gas lease revenues from wells on state lands and only used to buy lands which are environmentally sensitive or provided "significant" recreational opportunities. In January 1985, the Michigan Land Trust Board passed the trail proposal. The cost of the land was now up to $700,000 with a total project cost estimated to cost $1.15 million. The Michigan Land Trust Board received about 1,000 postcards sent from the group Property Owners United.

A $100,000 grant was approved by Gov. James Blanchard to employ 27 Michigan Youth Corps workers to clear the 36 1/2 miles of abandoned right-of-way.

A $250,000 grant from the Michigan Natural Resources Trust Fund was awarded for grading and surfacing work on the trail.

The trail is owned by the state of Michigan but, due to state budget cutbacks, in 2004 operation was taken over by Van Buren County, including the portion in Kalamazoo County. A trail pass system was re-instituted to pay for trail maintenance, but was dropped again in 2011.

For the Kalamazoo River Valley Trail, in November 2004 the State of Michigan completed a tunnel underneath the U.S. Highway 131 freeway, which was the major impediment to extending the trail to downtown Kalamazoo. The city of Kalamazoo approved a $1 million project to extend the trail southeast under U.S. 131 along Ravine Road to Westnedge Avenue in downtown Kalamazoo. Most of the extension was built along the former roadbed of the Kalamazoo and South Haven Railroad.

In the summer of 2022, it was announced that Michigan Department of Natural Resources had been awarded a $5 million grant to do resurface 17 miles of the trail. The project will resurface from the trail head in South Haven to Bloomingdale. The money is coming from the Building Michigan Together Plan, signed by Gov. Gretchen Whitmer in 2022. The Build Michigan Together Plan is a $4.8 billion federal funding to invest in roads, water, high-speed internet.

== Amenities ==
There are two primitive campgrounds that can be used at an additional cost. One, near Gobles, has water and restrooms. The other, near South Haven, has restrooms but no water.

Van Buren County offered a shuttle service through Van Buren Public Transit from South Haven to Kalamazoo and can accommodate up to four bikes and their riders. As of August 2015 this service was no longer offered.

The Kalamazoo Trail Head to South Haven Trail Head contain major deer fly populations. Several miles south of the western terminus is another trail—the Van Buren Trail State Park. This is also an old railroad bed, ending in Hartford, Michigan. The trail is unimproved and the largest group of users are snowmobilers and horse and buggy riders. This is also operated by Michigan D.N.R.

== Waypoints ==
Waypoints for the Kal-Haven Trail. ↑ in the Distance column points to the other waypoint that the distance is between.

Location	Services	Distance (approx.)	Coordinates
South Haven, Michigan	Parking		42°24′42″N 86°15′47″W
Waypoint 2	Drinking Fountain, Parking, Restroom	↑ 3.9 miles (6.3 km)	42°25′04″N 86°11′18″W
Grand Junction, Michigan	Drinking Fountain, Parking, Restroom	↑ 5.8 miles (9.3 km)	42°24′14″N 86°04′36″W
Bloomingdale, Michigan	Drinking Fountain, Parking, Restroom	↑ 6.2 miles (10.0 km)	42°23′00″N 85°57′29″W
Waypoint 5	Restroom	↑ 1.9 miles (3.1 km)	42°22′33″N 85°55′20″W
Waypoint 6	Drinking Fountain, Restroom	↑ 3.4 miles (5.5 km)	42°21′14″N 85°51′49″W
Kendall, Michigan	Restroom	↑ 2 miles (3.2 km)	42°21′38″N 85°49′29″W
Waypoint 8	Drinking Fountain, Restroom	↑ 2.9 miles (4.7 km)	42°21′25″N 85°46′06″W
Waypoint 9	Drinking Fountain, Restroom	↑ 3.3 miles (5.3 km)	42°22′11″N 85°42′27″W
Kalamazoo, Michigan	Drinking Fountain, Parking, Restroom	↑ 3.7 miles (6.0 km)	42°19′32″N 85°40′08″W

== Friends of the Kal-Haven Trail Organization ==
The group formed in the early days to advocate for the creation of the trail are still in support of the Kal-Haven and other Van Buren trails. The group's stated Mission is "Our mission is to provide support for expansion and maintenance of the Trails and continued programming, thereby attracting more people to take advantage of this regional resource."

== Image Gallery ==
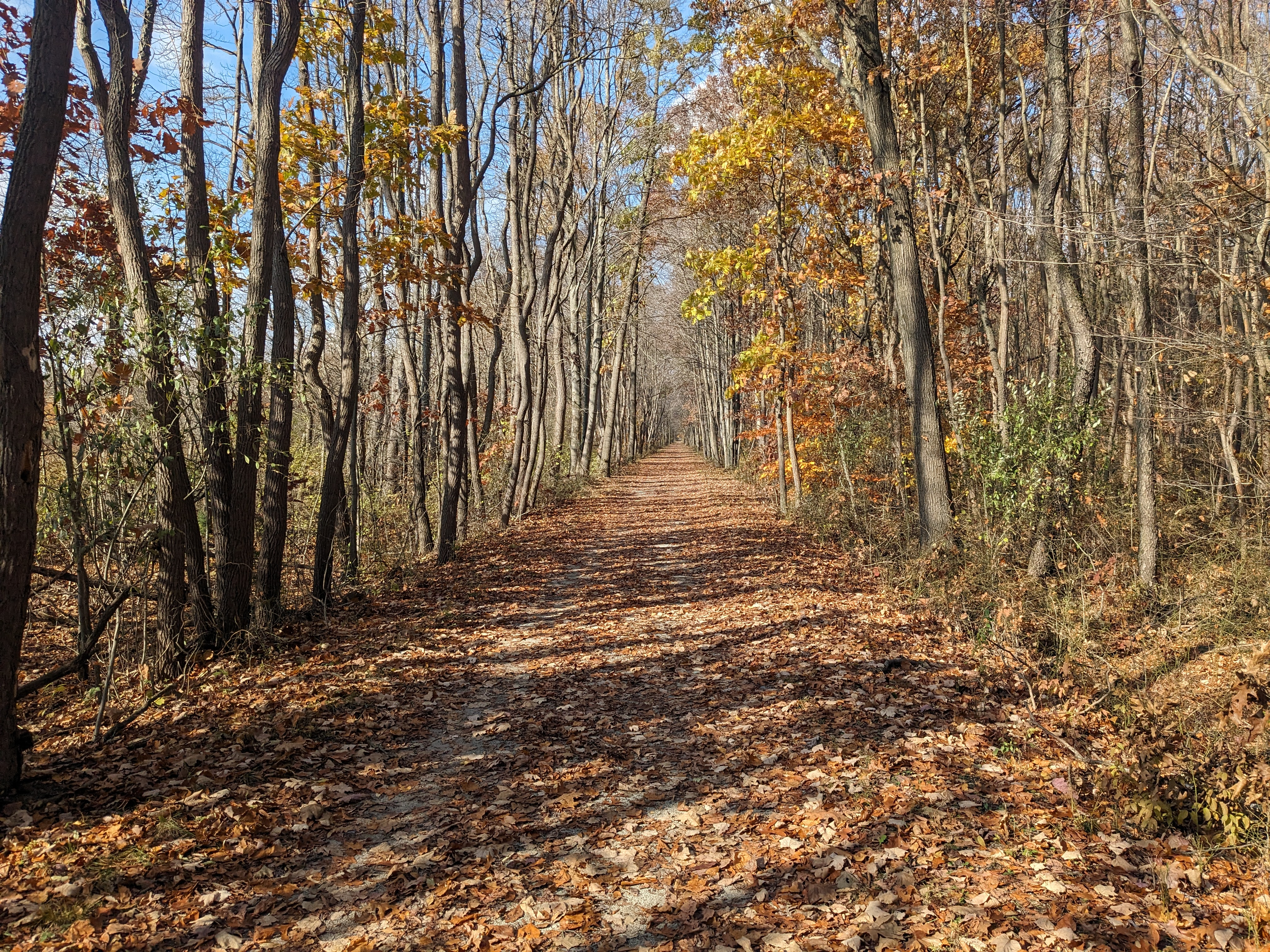
Kal-Haven Trail facing west.

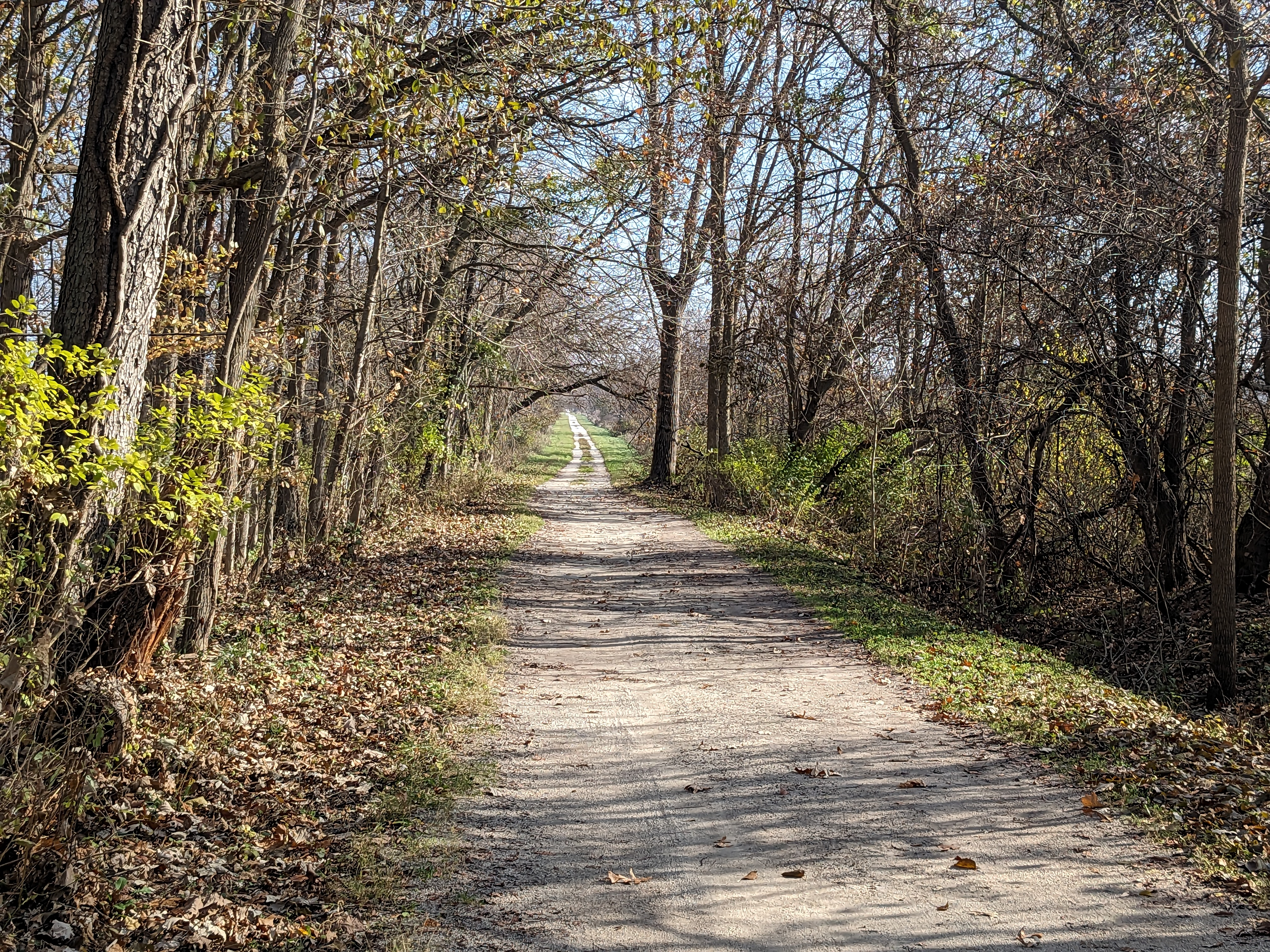
Kal-Haven Trail facing east.

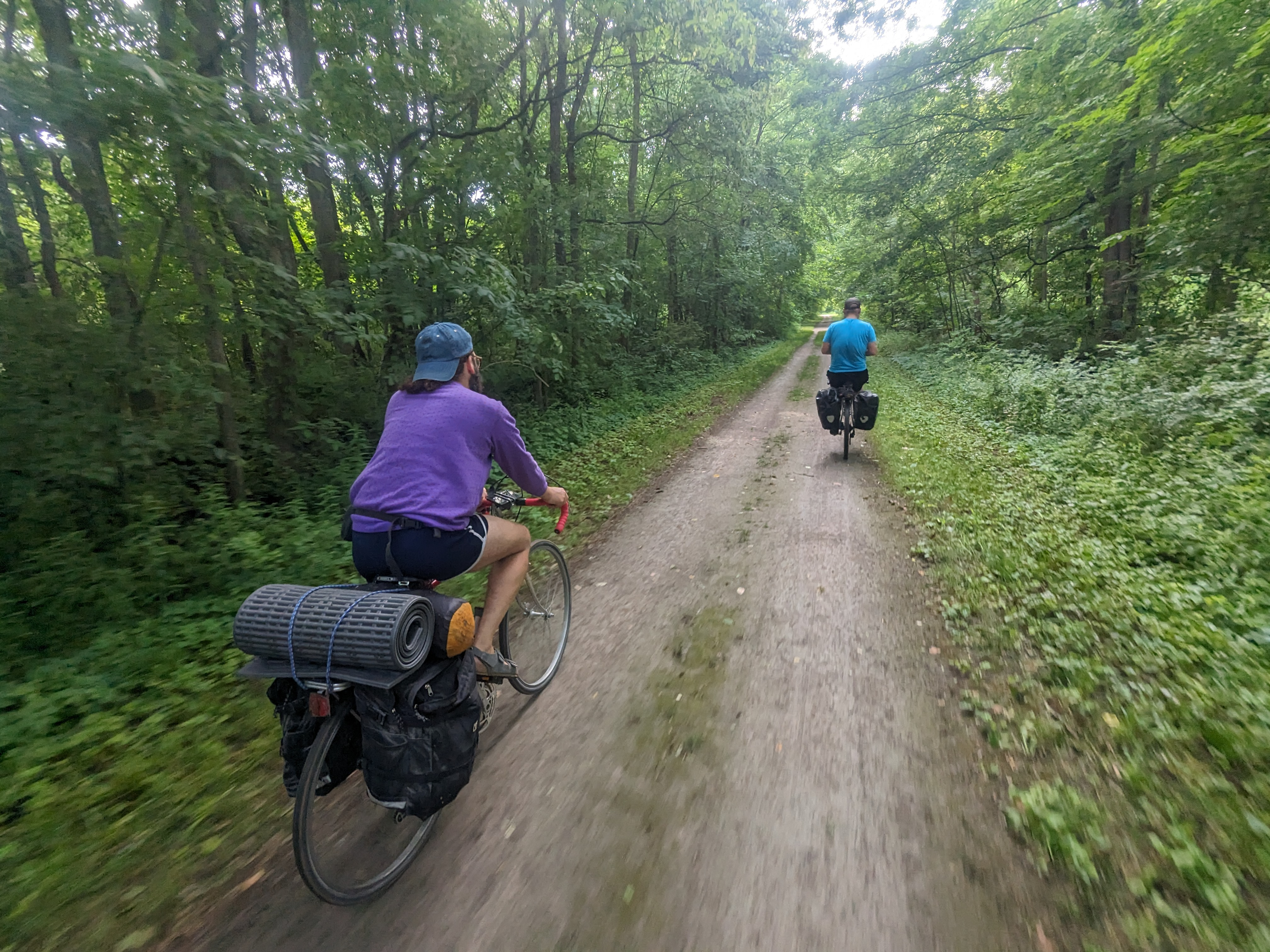
Two cyclists on the Kal-Haven Trail
