= Pine Grove Township, Michigan =

- Township
- Location within the state of Michigan Pine Grove Township, Michigan (the United States)
- Coordinates: 42°22′17″N 85°49′16″W
- Country: United States
- State: Michigan
- County: Van Buren

Area
  - Total: 35.0 sq mi (90.7 km^{2})
  - Land: 34.4 sq mi (89.2 km^{2})
  - Water: 0.58 sq mi (1.5 km^{2})
- Elevation: 932 ft (284 m)

Population (2020)
  - Total: 2,994
  - Density: 86.9/sq mi (33.6/km^{2})
- Time zone: UTC-5 (Eastern (EST))
  - Summer (DST): UTC-4 (EDT)
- FIPS code: 26-64280
- GNIS feature ID: 1626904
- Website: Township website

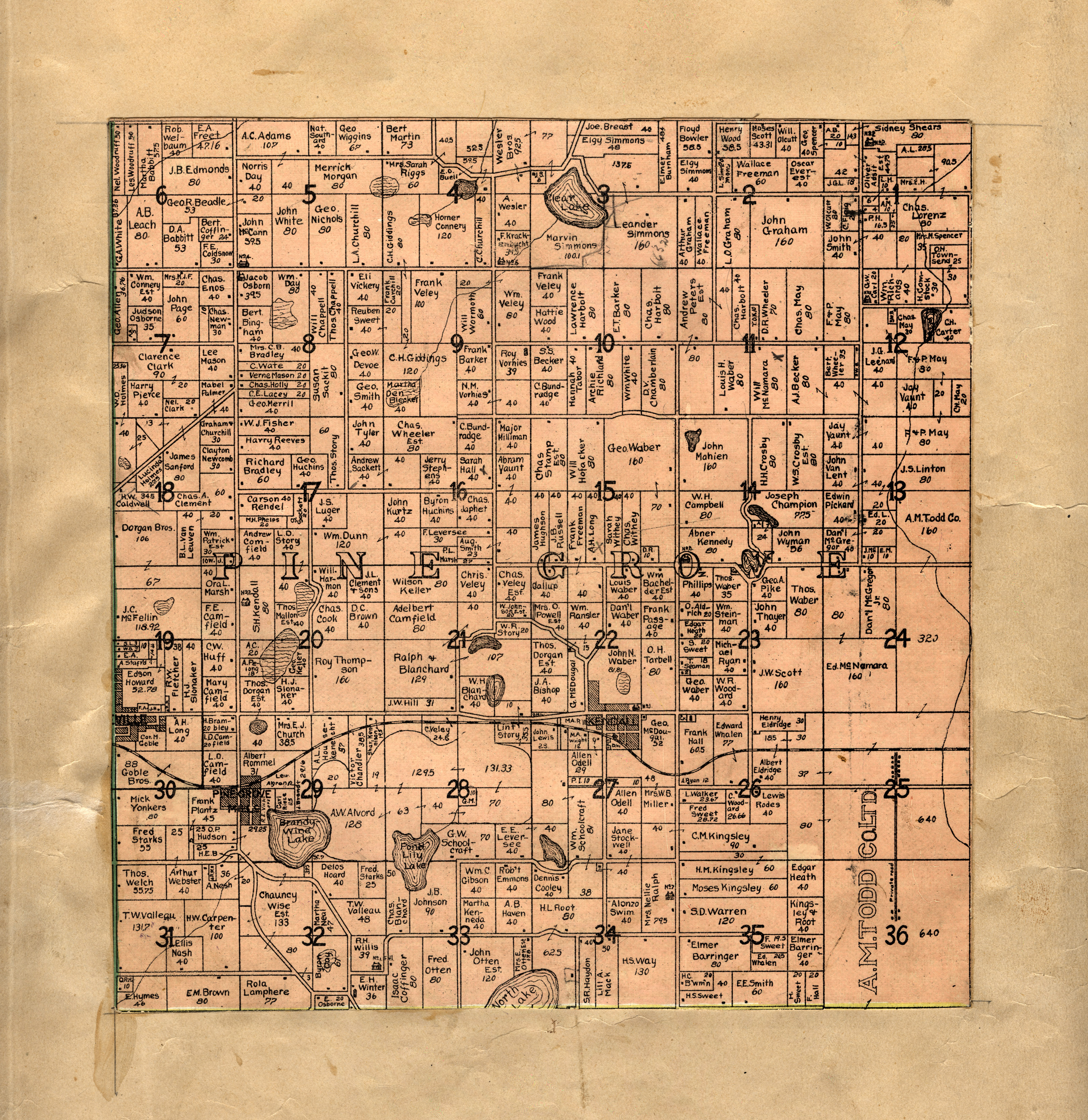
A 1906 cadastral map of Pine Grove Township, showing property lines and names of rural landowners

Pine Grove Township is a civil township of Van Buren County in the U.S. state of Michigan. The population was 2,994 at the 2020 census.

== Communities ==
- The city of Gobles straddles the western boundary of the township with Bloomingdale Township, but as a city, it is administratively autonomous of both townships.
- Kendall is an unincorporated community and the township seat. It is located between sections 22 and 27 at 42°21′42″N 85°48′48″W. The ZIP Code is 49062. It is named for Lucius B. Kendall, who settled there in 1864 and built up a successful company producing Barrel staves from the surrounding oak forests with a steam saw-mill. In 1870, Kendall was a principal player in pushing for the construction of a railroad line between Kalamazoo and South Haven through the town, which became a station on the South Haven division of the Michigan Central Railroad. A post office was also established in 1870, in which Kendall and his associates platted the village of Kendall. The Panic of 1873 ruined many of the businesses in town, causing a decline in population from a high of about 400 to about 250 in 1880.
- Mentha is a ghost town, formerly known as a major source for peppermint for the production of mint oil by the company of Albert M. Todd. It was located at 42°21′26″N 85°46′29″W.
- North Lake is an unincorporated community at 42°20′00″N 85°49′10″W on the boundary with Almena Township.
- Pine Grove Mills is a small settlement about a mile east of Gobles. It was platted February 4, 1870, receiving a post office in 1857 with David D. Wise as postmaster. Now a private residence, the post office still stands today. The railroad extension from Kalamazoo reached Pine Grove Mills on January 10, 1870. The first buildings were simple log cabins, often with dirt floors. The first framed dwelling was erected in 1856 by Wise, Merrill & Co. and was used for housing their employees. Lumber was the main industry in this locality, with farming supplanting it within the first few decades. Prominent early settlers include Daniel B. Brown, David Wise, Benjamin Deputy, David O. Everest and Chauncey Wise.

The Kal-Haven Trail runs through the township on a generally east–west line, going through Mentha, Kendall, Pine Grove Mills and Gobles.

== Geography ==
According to the United States Census Bureau, the township has a total area of 35.0 square miles (91 km^{2}), of which 34.4 square miles (89 km^{2}) is land and 0.6 square miles (1.6 km^{2}) (1.63%) is water.

== Demographics ==
As of the census of 2000, there were 2,773 people, 1,018 households, and 778 families residing in the township. The population density was 80.5 inhabitants per square mile (31.1/km^{2}). There were 1,123 housing units at an average density of 32.6 per square mile (12.6/km^{2}). The racial makeup of the township was 96.21% White, 1.01% African American, 0.47% Native American, 0.32% Asian, 0.61% from other races, and 1.37% from two or more races. Hispanic or Latino of any race were 1.51% of the population.

There were 1,018 households, out of which 33.4% had children under the age of 18 living with them, 63.9% were married couples living together, 6.7% had a female householder with no husband present, and 23.5% were non-families. 18.1% of all households were made up of individuals, and 7.3% had someone living alone who was 65 years of age or older. The average household size was 2.72 and the average family size was 3.08.

In the township the population was spread out, with 26.5% under the age of 18, 7.3% from 18 to 24, 28.6% from 25 to 44, 25.7% from 45 to 64, and 11.9% who were 65 years of age or older. The median age was 38 years. For every 100 females, there were 107.7 males. For every 100 females age 18 and over, there were 103.5 males.

The median income for a household in the township was $47,060, and the median income for a family was $52,788. Males had a median income of $38,828 versus $25,179 for females. The per capita income for the township was $22,270. About 2.3% of families and 4.4% of the population were below the poverty line, including 5.2% of those under age 18 and 2.3% of those age 65 or over.
