= Bloomingdale, Michigan =

- Village
- Location of Bloomingdale within Van Buren County, Michigan
- Coordinates: 42°23′0″N 85°57′33″W
- Country: United States
- State: Michigan
- County: Van Buren

Area
  - Total: 1.16 sq mi (3.01 km^{2})
  - Land: 1.14 sq mi (2.94 km^{2})
  - Water: 0.027 sq mi (0.07 km^{2})
- Elevation: 732 ft (223 m)

Population (2020)
  - Total: 513
  - Density: 451.8/sq mi (174.44/km^{2})
- Time zone: UTC-5 (Eastern (EST))
  - Summer (DST): UTC-4 (EDT)
- ZIP code: 49026
- Area code: 269
- FIPS code: 26-09220
- GNIS feature ID: 2398139

Bloomingdale is a village in Van Buren County in the U.S. state of Michigan. The population was 513 at the 2020 census. The village is located within Bloomingdale Township and is the township seat.

In the 1930s oil was discovered within the village limits, but pumping has now ceased due to lack of oil. Bloomingdale was thought to be a rising city but when the oil ceased, so did the attraction.

Michigan's Department of Natural Resources considers Bloomingdale to be the midpoint on the Kal-Haven Trail, which runs directly through the main four corners and business district. The downtown Augustus Haven Park with its Depot Museum is a picnic stop for trail users.

== History ==
Bloomingdale was founded in 1855. A post office was established in 1856. The small town was platted in 1870 and incorporated as a village in 1881.

== Geography ==
According to the United States Census Bureau, the village has a total area of 1.17 square miles (3.03 km^{2}), of which 1.14 square miles (2.95 km^{2}) is land and 0.03 square miles (0.08 km^{2}) is water.

=== Climate ===
Climate data for Bloomingdale, Michigan (1991–2020 normals, extremes 1904–present)
Month	Jan	Feb	Mar	Apr	May	Jun	Jul	Aug	Sep	Oct	Nov	Dec	Year
Record high °F (°C)	67 (19)	71 (22)	88 (31)	89 (32)	95 (35)	99 (37)	105 (41)	104 (40)	100 (38)	89 (32)	80 (27)	71 (22)	105 (41)
Mean daily maximum °F (°C)	32.0 (0.0)	34.7 (1.5)	45.1 (7.3)	57.8 (14.3)	69.6 (20.9)	79.2 (26.2)	82.9 (28.3)	81.3 (27.4)	74.6 (23.7)	61.7 (16.5)	48.1 (8.9)	37.1 (2.8)	58.7 (14.8)
Daily mean °F (°C)	24.6 (−4.1)	26.4 (−3.1)	35.2 (1.8)	46.2 (7.9)	57.9 (14.4)	67.8 (19.9)	71.5 (21.9)	69.9 (21.1)	62.7 (17.1)	50.9 (10.5)	39.5 (4.2)	30.2 (−1.0)	48.6 (9.2)
Mean daily minimum °F (°C)	17.2 (−8.2)	18.1 (−7.7)	25.3 (−3.7)	34.6 (1.4)	46.2 (7.9)	56.5 (13.6)	60.1 (15.6)	58.5 (14.7)	50.8 (10.4)	40.2 (4.6)	30.8 (−0.7)	23.4 (−4.8)	38.5 (3.6)
Record low °F (°C)	−22 (−30)	−23 (−31)	−12 (−24)	5 (−15)	14 (−10)	31 (−1)	37 (3)	33 (1)	26 (−3)	16 (−9)	−12 (−24)	−18 (−28)	−23 (−31)
Average precipitation inches (mm)	3.17 (81)	2.33 (59)	2.53 (64)	3.64 (92)	4.09 (104)	3.83 (97)	3.65 (93)	3.86 (98)	3.40 (86)	4.40 (112)	3.21 (82)	3.03 (77)	41.14 (1,045)
Average snowfall inches (cm)	35.9 (91)	22.9 (58)	7.9 (20)	1.7 (4.3)	0.0 (0.0)	0.0 (0.0)	0.0 (0.0)	0.0 (0.0)	0.0 (0.0)	0.5 (1.3)	7.3 (19)	32.8 (83)	109.0 (277)
Average precipitation days (≥ 0.01 in)	16.5	12.8	11.6	12.3	12.1	9.9	8.2	9.8	9.3	12.1	13.1	14.9	142.6
Average snowy days (≥ 0.1 in)	12.1	9.0	4.0	1.0	0.0	0.0	0.0	0.0	0.0	0.2	3.3	10.0	39.6
Source: NOAA

== Demographics ==
Historical population
Census	Pop.	Note	%±
1880	292		—
1890	380		30.1%
1900	379		−0.3%
1910	501		32.2%
1920	486		−3.0%
1930	386		−20.6%
1940	553		43.3%
1950	465		−15.9%
1960	471		1.3%
1970	496		5.3%
1980	537		8.3%
1990	503		−6.3%
2000	528		5.0%
2010	454		−14.0%
2020	513		13.0%
U.S. Decennial Census

=== 2010 census ===
As of the census of 2010, there were 454 people, 172 households, and 124 families living in the village. The population density was 398.2 inhabitants per square mile (153.7/km^{2}). There were 208 housing units at an average density of 182.5 per square mile (70.5/km^{2}). The racial makeup of the village was 93.4% White, 0.2% African American, 0.9% Native American, 0.2% Asian, 2.4% from other races, and 2.9% from two or more races. Hispanic or Latino of any race were 5.1% of the population.

There were 172 households, of which 36.6% had children under the age of 18 living with them, 46.5% were married couples living together, 16.9% had a female householder with no husband present, 8.7% had a male householder with no wife present, and 27.9% were non-families. 24.4% of all households were made up of individuals, and 7.5% had someone living alone who was 65 years of age or older. The average household size was 2.64 and the average family size was 3.03.

The median age in the village was 38.4 years. 24.4% of residents were under the age of 18; 9.7% were between the ages of 18 and 24; 23.9% were from 25 to 44; 29.3% were from 45 to 64; and 12.6% were 65 years of age or older. The gender makeup of the village was 46.0% male and 54.0% female.

=== 2000 census ===
As of the census of 2000, there were 528 people, 181 households, and 140 families living in the village. The population density was 469.5 inhabitants per square mile (181.3/km^{2}). There were 206 housing units at an average density of 183.2 per square mile (70.7/km^{2}). The racial makeup of the village was 90.72% White, 2.65% African American, 1.89% Native American, 2.08% from other races, and 2.65% from two or more races. Hispanic or Latino of any race were 3.60% of the population.

There were 181 households, out of which 46.4% had children under the age of 18 living with them, 54.7% were married couples living together, 14.4% had a female householder with no husband present, and 22.1% were non-families. 17.1% of all households were made up of individuals, and 7.2% had someone living alone who was 65 years of age or older. The average household size was 2.92 and the average family size was 3.23.

In the village, the population was spread out, with 31.8% under the age of 18, 10.4% from 18 to 24, 29.9% from 25 to 44, 17.2% from 45 to 64, and 10.6% who were 65 years of age or older. The median age was 32 years. For every 100 females, there were 103.1 males. For every 100 females age 18 and over, there were 96.7 males.

The median income for a household in the village was $35,714, and the median income for a family was $40,000. Males had a median income of $35,500 versus $21,500 for females. The per capita income for the village was $15,705. About 7.8% of families and 13.2% of the population were below the poverty line, including 12.9% of those under age 18 and 23.1% of those age 65 or over. The highest income reported was $350,000.

== Education ==
Public education is provided by the Bloomingdale Public Schools.

== Notable people ==
- Bill Killefer, (1887–1960) was a professional baseball player, coach and manager. Member of the 1915 NL Champions Philadelphia Phillies
- Red Killefer, (1885–1958) was an MLB outfielder who is known for his time with Detroit Tigers, member of Pacific Coast League Hall of Fame
- David Wayne, (1914–1995) was a stage and screen actor with a career spanning over 50 years.
