= Gobles, Michigan =

- City
- Location of Gobles, Michigan
- Coordinates: 42°21′36″N 85°52′46″W
- Country: United States
- State: Michigan
- County: Van Buren
- Platted: 1870
- Incorporation (village): 1893
- Incorporation (city): 1957

Area
  - Total: 1.03 sq mi (2.68 km^{2})
  - Land: 1.03 sq mi (2.68 km^{2})
  - Water: 0 sq mi (0.00 km^{2})
- Elevation: 817 ft (249 m)

Population (2020)
  - Total: 851
  - Density: 823.9/sq mi (318.12/km^{2})
- Time zone: UTC-5 (Eastern (EST))
  - Summer (DST): UTC-4 (EDT)
- ZIP code: 49055
- Area code: 269
- FIPS code: 26-32640
- GNIS feature ID: 0626910

Gobles is a city in Van Buren County of the U.S. state of Michigan. As of the 2020 census, Gobles had a population of 851. It was originally called Gobleville, after its founders, the Goble family.

== History ==
In 1864–5, John Goble built a hotel in this location. In 1870, the area was platted as 'Gobleville' by Hiram E. Goble. Warren Goble platted an addition to the original plat 2 years later. Hiram Goble also became the first postmaster on April 16, 1872 when the post office was moved from Lake Mills. Gobleville was incorporated as a village in 1893. The current name of 'Gobles' was adopted on April 10, 1922. Gobles was incorporated as a city in 1957.

On April 6, 2012, a fire raged throughout downtown for which 13 fire departments were called in to assist. The buildings that were destroyed were more than 100 years old.

== Geography ==
According to the United States Census Bureau, the city has a total area of 1.03 square miles (2.67 km^{2}), all land.

== Demographics ==
Historical population
Census	Pop.	Note	%±
1880	181		—
1900	505		—
1910	537		6.3%
1920	491		−8.6%
1930	519		5.7%
1940	616		18.7%
1950	622		1.0%
1960	816		31.2%
1970	801		−1.8%
1980	816		1.9%
1990	769		−5.8%
2000	815		6.0%
2010	829		1.7%
2020	851		2.7%
U.S. Decennial Census

=== 2010 census ===
As of the census of 2010, there were 829 people, 320 households, and 210 families living in the city. The population density was 804.9 inhabitants per square mile (310.8/km^{2}). There were 347 housing units at an average density of 336.9 per square mile (130.1/km^{2}). The racial makeup of the city was 93.1% White, 0.6% African American, 0.2% Native American, 1.7% from other races, and 4.3% from two or more races. Hispanic or Latino of any race were 4.9% of the population.

There were 320 households, of which 35.3% had children under the age of 18 living with them, 45.3% were married couples living together, 14.1% had a female householder with no husband present, 6.3% had a male householder with no wife present, and 34.4% were non-families. 29.7% of all households were made up of individuals, and 15% had someone living alone who was 65 years of age or older. The average household size was 2.59 and the average family size was 3.24.

The median age in the city was 37.7 years. 27.6% of residents were under the age of 18; 6.9% were between the ages of 18 and 24; 26% were from 25 to 44; 26.7% were from 45 to 64; and 12.7% were 65 years of age or older. The gender makeup of the city was 47.6% male and 52.4% female.

=== 2000 census ===
As of the census of 2000, there were 815 people, 314 households, and 209 families living in the city. The population density was 786.9 inhabitants per square mile (303.8/km^{2}). There were 333 housing units at an average density of 321.5 per square mile (124.1/km^{2}). The racial makeup of the city was 94.11% White, 1.84% Native American, 0.12% Asian, 1.10% from other races, and 2.82% from two or more races. Hispanic or Latino of any race were 2.33% of the population.

There were 314 households, out of which 35.0% had children under the age of 18 living with them, 44.9% were married couples living together, 16.9% had a female householder with no husband present, and 33.4% were non-families. 28.7% of all households were made up of individuals, and 15.0% had someone living alone who was 65 years of age or older. The average household size was 2.57 and the average family size was 3.13.

In the city, the population was spread out, with 30.6% under the age of 18, 8.2% from 18 to 24, 29.2% from 25 to 44, 18.8% from 45 to 64, and 13.3% who were 65 years of age or older. The median age was 34 years. For every 100 females, there were 81.9 males. For every 100 females age 18 and over, there were 76.3 males.

The median income for a household in the city was $26,917, and the median income for a family was $33,194. Males had a median income of $31,250 versus $21,818 for females. The per capita income for the city was $12,804. About 16.4% of families and 18.3% of the population were below the poverty line, including 21.0% of those under age 18 and 17.8% of those age 65 or over.

== Attractions ==
The Kal-Haven Trail, which runs from Kalamazoo to South Haven, Michigan, goes through the city's business district.

== Notable people ==
- Tubby Meyers - college football player and coach for Western Michigan, was born in Gobleville.
