= Michigan's 61st House of Representatives district =

American legislative district

Michigan's 61st State House of Representatives district
Representative
Denise Mentzer; D–Mount Clemens
- Demographics: 71.7% White; 14.4% Black; 4.1% Hispanic; 3.7% Asian; 0.1% Native American; 0.4% Other; 5.7% Multiracial
- Population (2024): 93,323

Michigan's 61st House of Representatives district (also referred to as Michigan's 61st House district) is a legislative district within the Michigan House of Representatives located in part of Macomb County. The district was created in 1965, when the Michigan House of Representatives district naming scheme changed from a county-based system to a numerical one.

== List of representatives ==
Representative	Party	Dates	Residence	Notes
Francis A. Crowley	Democratic	1965–1966	Clarkston	
Loren D. Anderson	Republican	1967–1972	Pontiac	
Melvin L. Larsen	Republican	1973–1978	Oxford	
Alice Tomboulian	Democratic	1979–1980	Oakland Township	
Mat J. Dunaskiss	Republican	1981–1990	Lake Orion	
Tom F. Middleton	Republican	1991–1992	Ortonville	
Dale L. Shugars	Republican	1993–1994	Portage	
Charles R. Perricone	Republican	1995–2000	Kalamazoo	
Tom George	Republican	2001–2002	Kalamazoo	
Jack Hoogendyk	Republican	2003–2008	Texas Township	Lived in Portage until around 2007.
Larry DeShazor	Republican	2009–2010	Portage	
Margaret O'Brien	Republican	2011–2014	Portage	
Brandt Iden	Republican	2015–2020	Kalamazoo	Lived in Oshtemo from around 2017 to 2018.
Christine Morse	Democratic	2021–2022	Texas Township	
Denise Mentzer	Democratic	2023–present	Mount Clemens	

== Recent elections ==
=== 2020s ===
2026 Michigan House of Representatives election
Party	Candidate	Votes	%
Democratic	Denise Mentzer (incumbent)	23,381	56.02
Republican	Robert Wojtowicz	18,357	43.98
Total votes		41,738	100
Democratic hold			

2020 Michigan House of Representatives election
Party	Candidate	Votes	%
Republican	Bronwyn Haltom	27,088	45.93
Democratic	Christine Morse	31,888	54.07
Total votes		58,976	100
Democratic gain from Republican			

=== 2018 ===
2018 Michigan House of Representatives election
Party	Candidate	Votes	%
Republican	Brandt Iden	24,002	51.37
Democratic	Alberta Griffin	22,719	48.63
Total votes		46,721	100
Republican hold			

=== 2016 ===
2016 Michigan House of Representatives election
Party	Candidate	Votes	%
Republican	Brandt Iden	25,149	49.39%
Democratic	John Fisher	22,755	44.69%
Libertarian	Ryan Winfield	3,018	5.93%
Total votes		50,922	100.00%
Republican hold			

=== 2014 ===
2014 Michigan House of Representatives election
Party	Candidate	Votes	%
Republican	Brandt Iden	16,015	48.38
Democratic	John Fischer	14,145	42.73
Libertarian	Michael Stampfler	2,941	8.88
Total votes		33,101	100.0
Republican hold			

=== 2012 ===
2012 Michigan House of Representatives election
Party	Candidate	Votes	%
Republican	Margaret O'Brien	27,726	58.25
Democratic	Michael Martin	19,876	41.75
Total votes		47,602	100.0
Republican hold			

=== 2010 ===
2010 Michigan House of Representatives election
Party	Candidate	Votes	%
Republican	Margaret O'Brien	21,917	61.59
Democratic	Thomas Batten	13,669	38.41
Total votes		35,586	100.0
Republican hold			

=== 2008 ===
2008 Michigan House of Representatives election
Party	Candidate	Votes	%
Republican	Larry DeShazor	28,303	51.07
Democratic	Julie Rogers	27,122	48.93
Total votes		55,425	100.0
Republican hold			

== Historical district boundaries ==
Map	Description	Apportionment Plan	Notes
	Oakland County (part): Independence Township; Springfield Township; Sylvan Lake; Waterford Township; White Lake Township	1964 Apportionment Plan	
	Oakland County (part): Addison Township; Oakland Township; Orion Township; Oxford Township; Pontiac (part); Pontiac Township	1972 Apportionment Plan	
	Oakland County (part): Addison Township; Brandon Township; Independence Township; Oakland Township; Orion Township; Oxford Township; Springfield Township	1982 Apportionment Plan	
	Kalamazoo County (part): Alamo Township; Cooper Township; Kalamazoo Township (part); Oshtemo Township; Portage (part); Richland Township; Texas Township	1992 Apportionment Plan	
	Kalamazoo County (part): Alamo Township; Kalamazoo Township (part); Oshtemo Township; Parchment; Portage (part); Prairie Ronde Township; Texas Township	2001 Apportionment Plan	
	Kalamazoo County (part): Oshtemo Township; Portage (part); Prairie Ronde Township; Schoolcraft Township; Texas Township	2011 Apportionment Plan	
