= Jack Hoogendyk =

American politician (born 1955)

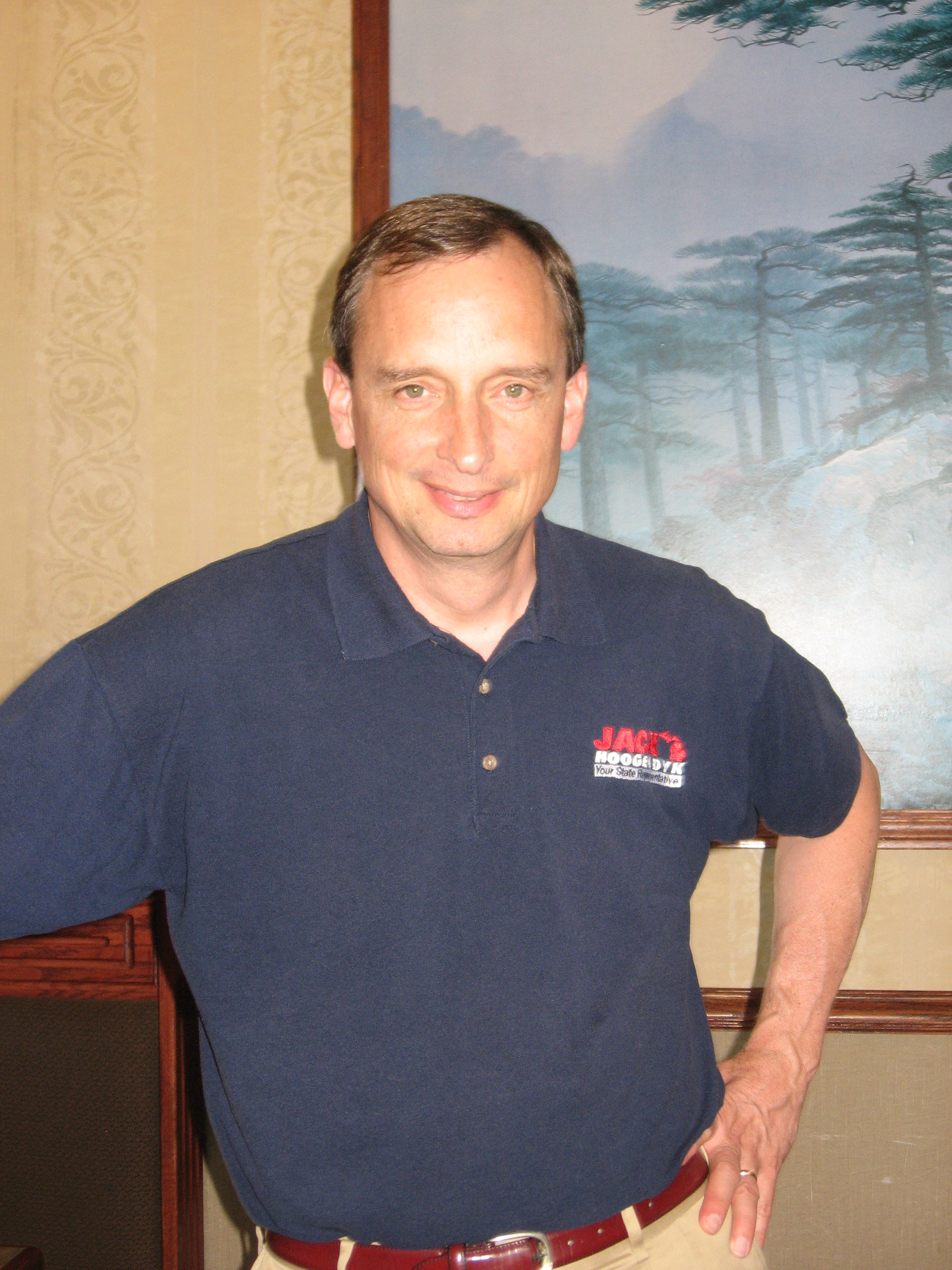

Member of the Michigan House of Representatives from the 61st district
- In office January 1, 2003 – December 31, 2008
- Preceded by: Tom George
- Succeeded by: Larry DeShazor

Personal details
- Born: July 31, 1955 (age 70) Kalamazoo, Michigan, U.S.
- Party: Republican
- Spouse: Erin

Jacob "Jack" Hoogendyk (/ˈhoʊɡəndaɪk/ HOH-gən-dyke; born July 31, 1955) is an American businessman and Republican politician, a former member of the Michigan House of Representatives and 2012 candidate for the U.S. House of Representatives in Michigan.

== Early life, education, and business career ==
Hoogendyk was born in Kalamazoo, Michigan. He is of Dutch ancestry. He worked as a manager with a Fortune 500 company. He joined Alternatives of Kalamazoo, Pregnancy Care Center as executive director in April 1996. In 2000, Hoogendyk was elected to the Kalamazoo County Board of Commissioners. Prior to that, he was on the Portage Zoning Board of Appeals and the Kalamazoo County Public Health Advisory Board.

== Michigan House of Representatives ==
=== Elections ===
After redistricting, Jack ran for Michigan's 61st House District in 2002 and defeated Democrat James Houston 57%-43%. In 2004, he won re-election to a second term with 55% of the vote. In 2006, he won re-election to a third term with just 51% of the vote.

=== Tenure ===
Hoogendyk was first elected to the Michigan House of Representatives in 2002 representing the 61st district, which includes the cities of Portage and Parchment, and the townships of Alamo, Kalamazoo, Oshtemo, Prairie Ronde and Texas.

Hoogendyk is well known for his conservative views on taxes, government spending, family issues, abortion, and affirmative action. Hoogendyk has proposed making English the official language of the State of Michigan. He was twice rated the most conservative member of the Michigan House of Representatives.

In 2006 Hoogendyk was one of a small group of conservatives to lead the fight against legislation to mandate that the state Department of Education administer to all sixth grade girls the vaccine Gardasil as a potential prevention against the risk of Human papillomavirus. Following the defeat of this legislation, no other state has implemented similar legislation.

== Campaigns for higher office ==
=== 2006 gubernatorial election ===
In 2004 he announced his intent to seek the Republican nomination for Governor of Michigan but eventually dropped out of the race to endorse Republican rival Dick DeVos.

=== 2008 U.S. Senate election ===
In 2008, the term-limited Hoogendyk announced that he was running in the Republican primary to contest Democrat Carl Levin's seat in the U.S. Senate. He was the only Republican on the August 5 primary ballot. Levin won re-election, defeating Hoogendyk 63%-34%.

General election results United States Senate election in Michigan, 2008
Party	Candidate	Votes	%	±%
Democratic	Carl Levin (inc.)	3,038,386	62.7	+2.1
Republican	Jack Hoogendyk	1,641,070	33.8	−4.1
Libertarian	Scotty Boman	76,347	1.6	n/a
Green	Harley Mikkelson	43,440	0.9	+0.1
U.S. Taxpayers	Michael Nikitin	30,827	0.6	n/a
Natural Law	Doug Dern	18,550	0.4	+0.1
Majority		1,397,316		
Turnout		4,848,620		
Democratic hold		Swing		

=== 2010 congressional election ===
In March 2010, Hoogendyk announced on his website that he would enter the Republican primary in Michigan's 6th congressional district against incumbent Republican U.S. Congressman Fred Upton. Upton defeated him 57%-43%, winning every county in the district.

=== 2012 congressional election ===
In 2011, Hoogendyk met with the Club for Growth, a fiscally conservative 501(c)4 organization, about running against Upton in 2012. Upton has received criticism for not being conservative enough from Rush Limbaugh, Glenn Beck, FreedomWorks, Right to Life of Michigan, and the Southwest Michigan Tea Party Patriots. He announced his candidacy on January 17, 2012. He was not able to unseat Upton and ultimately lost the primary with 33% of the vote. The election was held on August 7, 2012.

== Personal life ==
Hoogendyk is a Baptist. He has been married to his wife Erin since April 4, 1976, has five children and as of June 2012 had eleven grandchildren. He moved to Wausau, Wisconsin in June 2013 to become the Executive Director of Hope Life Center.

== See also ==
- 2008 United States Senate election in Michigan

Party political offices
Preceded by Rocky Raczkowski	Republican nominee for U.S. Senator from Michigan (Class 2); 2008	Succeeded by Terri Lynn Land
