= Rocky River (Michigan) =

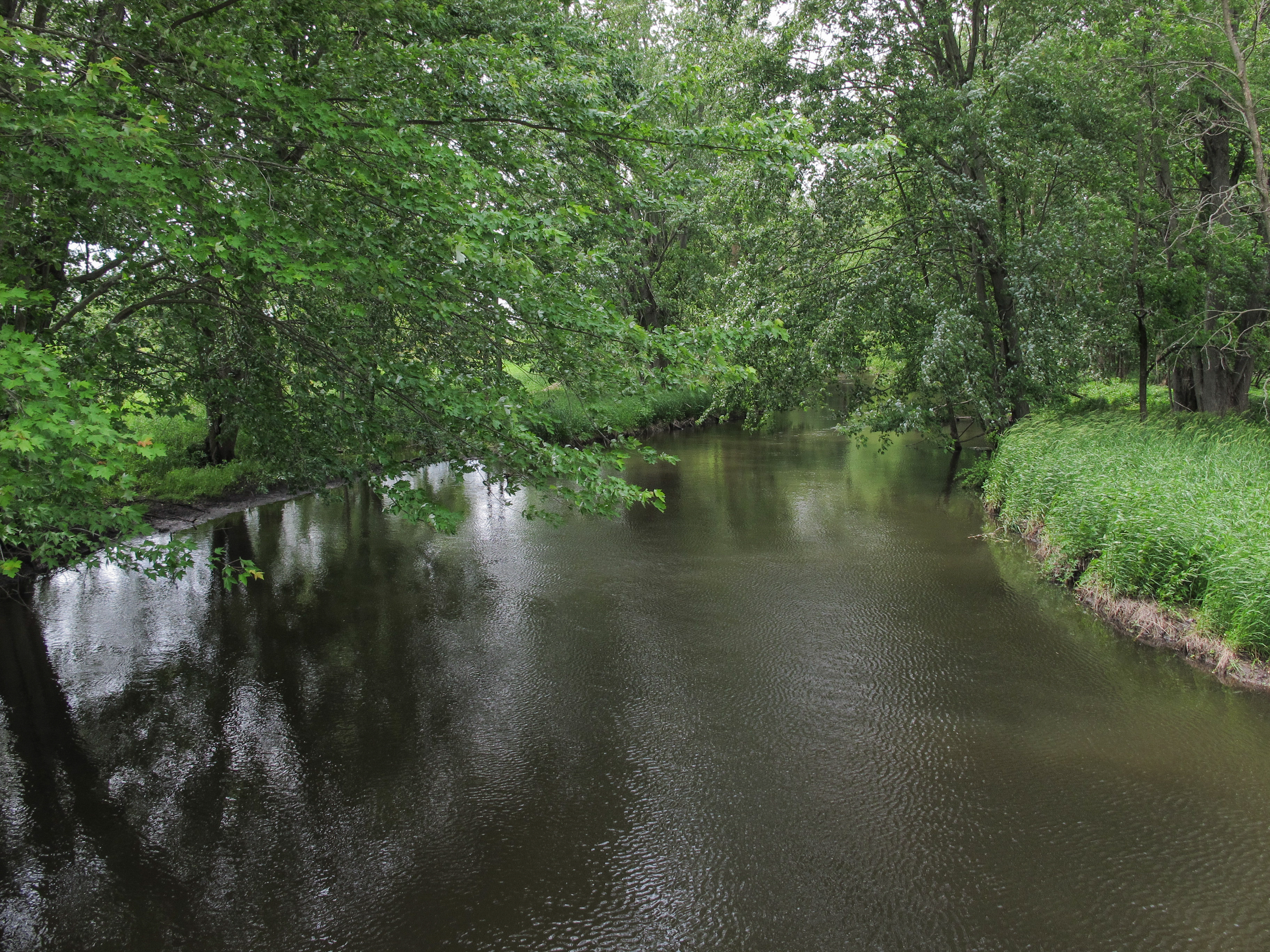
- The Rocky River in Flowerfield Township

Location
- Country: United States

Physical characteristics
- Source
  - location: Southwest Marcellus Township in Cass County, Michigan
- Mouth
  - location: St. Joseph River in Three Rivers
- Length: 28 mi (45 km)
- Basin size: 450 km^{2} (170 sq mi)
- Discharge
  - average: 1.5–2.0 m^{3}/s (53–71 cu ft/s)

Basin features
- River system: St. Joseph River

The Rocky River is a 28.3-mile-long (45.5 km) stream located in the southwest part of the U.S. state of Michigan that flows into the St. Joseph River at 41°56′33″N 85°37′59″W in the city of Three Rivers in St. Joseph County. The Rocky River, along with the St. Joseph River and the Portage River, are the three rivers from which the city of Three Rivers takes its name.

The Rocky River rises in southwest Marcellus Township in Cass County at 41°59′43″N 85°51′04″W. It flows to the northeast, arcing gently to the southeast before turning sharply to the south in eastern Flowerfield Township, shortly after being joined by the Flowerfield Creek. It then flows mostly southward until joining the St. Joseph River in Three Rivers.

The Rocky River watershed encompasses over 112,000 acres (45,000 ha) and drains all or portions of the following cities and townships:

- In Cass County
  - Marcellus Township
  - Newberg Township
  - Penn Township
  - Volinia Township
- In Kalamazoo County
  - Prairie Ronde Township (via Flowerfield Creek)
  - Schoolcraft Township (via Spring Creek)
  - Texas Charter Township
- In St. Joseph County
  - Fabius Township (via Kerr Creek)
  - Flowerfield Township
  - Lockport Township
  - Park Township
  - Three Rivers
- In Van Buren County
  - Porter Township (via Sheldon Creek, Flowerfield Creek, and Four County Drain)

== Tributaries ==
- (left) Kerr Creek
  - Little Pleasant Lake
    - Pleasant Lake
- (left) Armalege Drain
  - Goose Lake
- (right) Flowerfield Creek
  - (right) Spring Creek
- (right) Four County Drain
- (left) Ayers Lake
- (right) Sheldon Creek
  - (right) Lewis Lake
    - Mud Lake
- (left) Pickerel Lake
  - Skyhawk Lake
  - Streaters Mill Pond
  - Bogart Lake
- (right) Huyck Lake
