= Mattawan Consolidated School =

School district in Michigan, United States

Address
- 56720 Murray Street Mattawan, Van Buren, Michigan, 49071; United States

District information
- Grades: PreK–12
- Superintendent: Randy Fleenor
- Schools: 5
- Budget: $52,584,000 2022-2023 expenditures
- NCES District ID: 2623250

Students and staff
- Enrollment: 3,545 (2024-2025)
- Teachers: 198.98 FTE (2024-2025)
- Staff: 388.6 FTE (2024-2025)
- Student–teacher ratio: 17.82 (2024-2025)

Other information
- Website: www.mattawanschools.org

Mattawan Consolidated School is a Michigan school district in Van Buren and Kalamazoo Counties. It serves the village of Mattawan and parts of Almena, and Antwerp in Van Buren County and parts of Oshtemo, Prairie Ronde Township, and Texas Township in Kalamazoo County.

== History ==
Although a traditional public school district, Mattawan does not use the word "district" in its name. The practice of using the singular "school" in its official name began with the district's founding in 1910. It was unusual at the time for an agricultural village to consolidate the rural schoolhouses in the surrounding townships into a single district. It is considered the state's oldest consolidated school district.

The first brick school facility was built in 1890, and it burned down and was rebuilt in 1905. A junior high was built in 1936, and an elementary school was built in 1953. A high school was built in 1959 and replaced in 1990. The former high school became the Later Elementary, then the Early Childhood Center after a renovation.

A bond issue passed in 2014 funded the construction of a new Early Elementary and a Later Elementary. The 1936 building, used for administration, and the 1953 elementary school were demolished as part of the 2018 bond issue.

== Schools ==
All schools share the address of 56720 Murray Street, Mattawan. The buildings are on a contiguous site bisected by Western Street. The high school, middle school and early childhood education center are in separate buildings, and the Early Elementary and Later Elementary buildings are connected.

Schools in Mattawan Consolidated School District
School	Notes
Mattawan Early Childhood Education / Young Fives	Preschool and Young Fives programs, including kindergarten. Formerly Later Elementary, renovated as part of 2018 bond issue. Originally built in 1959 as Mattawan High School.
Mattawan Early Elementary	Serves grades K–2. Opened fall 2018.
Mattawan Later Elementary	Serves grades 3–5. Opened fall 2017.
Mattawan Middle School	Serves grades 6–8
Mattawan High School	Serves grades 9–12. Built 1990.
