= Schoolcraft Community Schools =

School district in Michigan, United States

Address
- 13400 S. 14th Street Schoolcraft, Kalamazoo County, Michigan, 49087; United States

District information
- Grades: PreKindergarten–12
- Superintendent: Nate Ledlow
- Schools: 2
- Budget: $31,073,000 2022-2023 expenditures
- NCES District ID: 2631020

Students and staff
- Students: 1,085 (2024-2025)
- Teachers: 73.63 (on an FTE basis) (2024-2025)
- Staff: 120.17 FTE (2024-2025)
- Student–teacher ratio: 14.74 (2024-2025)

Other information
- Website: www.schoolcraftschools.org

Schoolcraft Community Schools is a public school district in West Michigan. It serves Schoolcraft, part of Portage, and parts of the townships of Prairie Ronde, Schoolcraft, and Texas.

== History ==
Schoolcraft's public school district was established in 1837 and a school was built that year. For a time, the district used a grade school that was built as part of Cedar Park Seminary.

In 1871, the district became a union school district and a new school was built. The first high school class graduated in 1878. A new school was built in 1939 on East Cass Street next to the 1871 school. It was expanded in 1951. For a time, it was the district's only school.

A new high school was built around 1962.

The district currently operates two school buildings, the oldest of which was built in 1999. Formerly, Schoolcraft Elementary (built in 1969) and Schoolcraft Middle School (the 1962 high school building) were located on East Clay Street in Schoolcraft.

The current Schoolcraft High School, designed by URS Greiner, opened in fall 1999. In 2016, declining enrollment led the district to consolidate its schools, reducing the number from four to three. The Early Elementary School, housed in the 1939 school building, would close, and fifth graders would move from the elementary school to the middle school.

A new Schoolcraft Elementary opened in fall 2023, next to the high school. The building's architect was TMP Associates. The other schools in the district, except the high school, were then closed.

== Schools ==
Schools in Schoolcraft Community Schools district
School	Address	Notes
Schoolcraft Junior-Senior High School	13400 S 14th Street, Schoolcraft	Grades 7–12. Built 1999.
Schoolcraft Elementary	13300 S 14th Street, Schoolcraft	Grades PreK–6. Built 2023.
