= Al Sabo Preserve =

Nature preserve in Michigan

Coordinates: 42°13′44.32″N 85°40′00.98″W

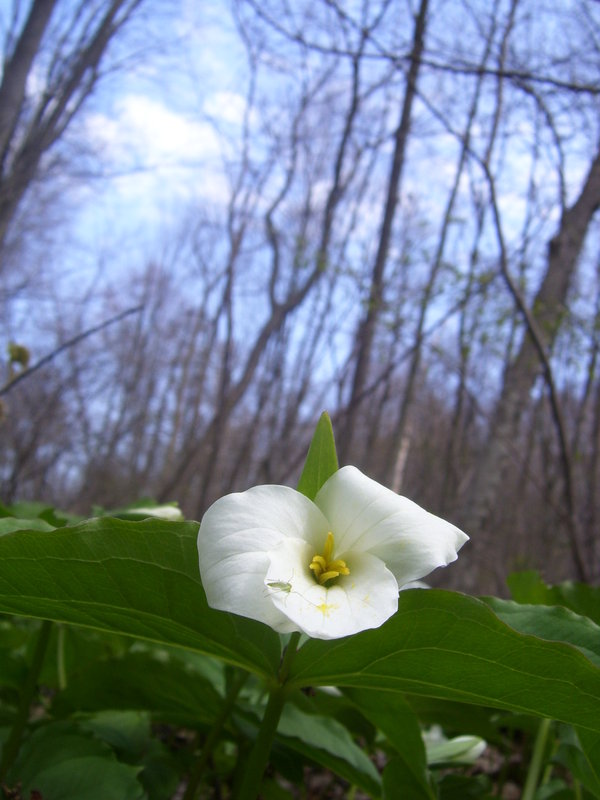
- A trillium in Al Sabo Preserve
- Interactive map of Al Sabo Preserve
- Location: Texas Township, Kalamazoo County, Michigan
- Area: 741 acres (300 ha)
- Created: 1971

Al Sabo Preserve is an area of northeastern Texas Township, in southwestern Kalamazoo County, Michigan. It comprises 741 acres (3.00 km^{2}) of marsh, forest, streams, and rolling hills. Numerous trails provide recreational opportunities throughout the Preserve.

== Location and access ==
Al Sabo Preserve is located between Interstate 94 to the north, Texas Drive to the south, 12th Street to the east, and Kalamazoo Valley Community College at 9th Street and O Ave to the west. Atwater Millpond lies at the northeast corner of the Al Sabo Preserve, fed by the west branch of Portage Creek, which flows through Al Sabo Preserve, and forms a tributary for the Kalamazoo River. Camp Rota-Kiwan Boy Scout camp lies at the southwest corner of Al Sabo Preserve. Although Hiking trails may cross this boundary, there are numerous "No Trespassing" signs.

Access to the Al Sabo Preserve is gained through an entrance on Texas Drive, near the intersection of Texas and 10th Avenue. A parking lot for Al Sabo Preserve is located next to the Texas Drive entrance to Camp Rota-Kiwan. Foot trails lead into Al Sabo Preserve from the Rota-Kiwan Boy Scout Camp, and from the campus of Kalamazoo Valley Community College.

== Recreation ==
Mountain biking is a popular activity in Al Sabo Preserve . Over two thirds of the trails were closed to cycling as a result of a dispute over land use, seven miles (11 km) remain open. These trails include Moab, Atwater, Lookout, and Mandala.

Two boardwalks are present (but not easy to find) in Al Sabo Preserve, providing access to the water from the hiking trails above. In addition, numerous overlooks provide panoramic views of the Preserve, particularly in the winter and spring.

== Wildlife ==
Wildlife abounds in Al Sabo Preserve. Bird species are particularly numerous, including many migrants during the spring; year-round species are also plentiful with both woodland songbirds and waterfowl including duck, goose, and swan. As of fall 2016, 167 species have been identified within the preserve (see eBird.org, Kalamazoo county). Sandhill cranes nest in the preserve. Muskrat and perhaps beaver occasionally create dams on Portage Creek, causing flooding upstream in the spring, and inundation of the Atwater Millpond shoreline when cleared. Deer, fox, coyote, raccoons, squirrels, and other mammals reside in the area. Fish include bass, bluegill, perch, and crappie. Soft-shell, snapping, and other turtle species populate the area, laying eggs near the sandy road that bisects the preserve.

== History ==
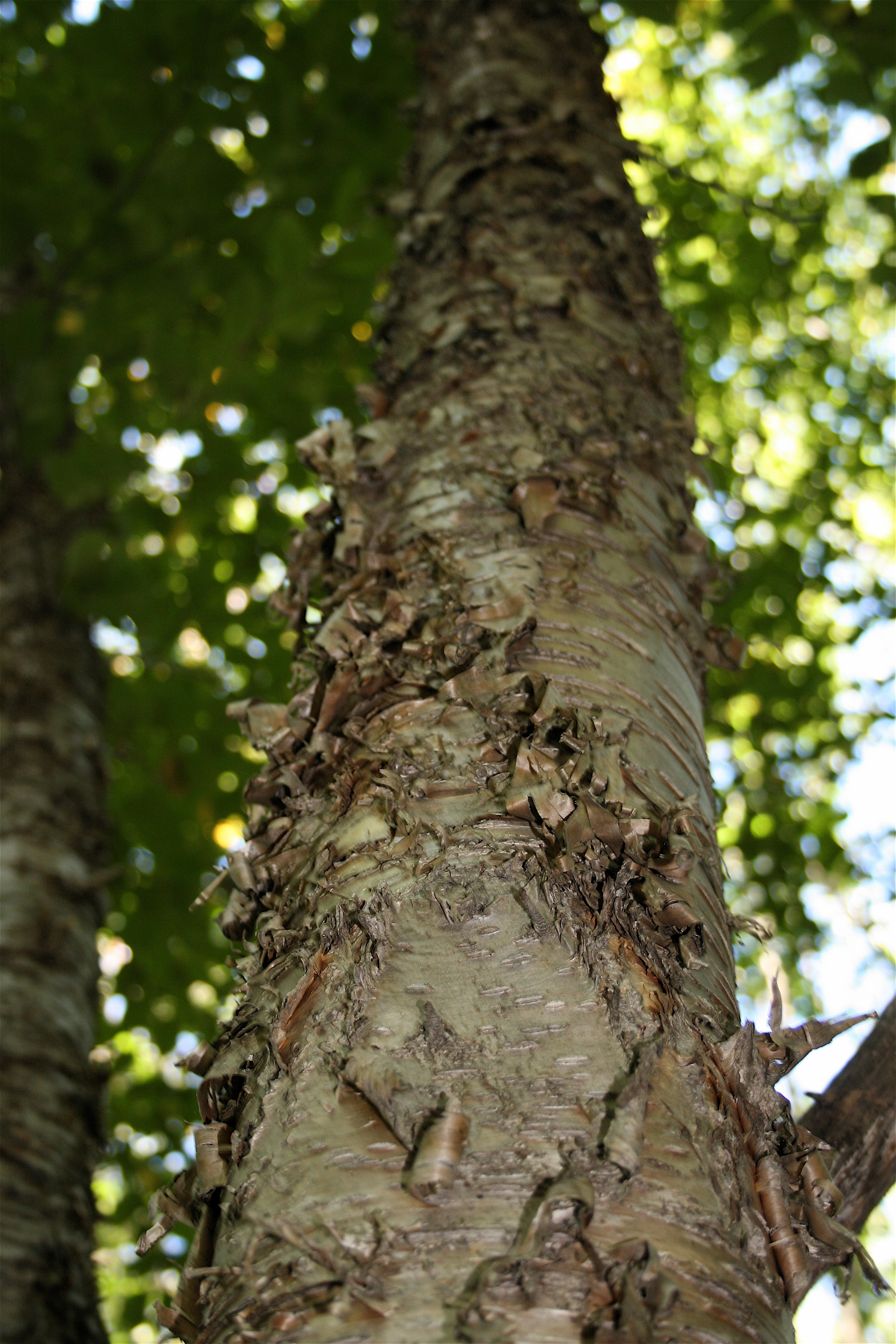
A Yellow Birch (Betula alleghaniensis) at Al Sabo Preserve

The Preserve was established in 1971, and named after Albert Sabo, who had been Director of the City of Kalamazoo's Utilities Department for 15 years until 1969.

A large painted mural of the surrounding wetlands is on one of the interior walls of the preserve's main pump house.

In 1992 the preserve was closed due to conflicts between trail users. The preserve was re-opened in 1993. Bicycles are restricted to approximately seven of the 25 miles of trails.

The City of Kalamazoo, Michigan uses the watershed containing the Al Sabo Preserve as part of the municipal water supply. A water quality study resulted in a Watershed Management Plan, approved on February 10, 2006.

On April 26, 2006, a wildfire in Al Sabo Preserve burned approximately two acres of woods near the Lookout Trail overlook. It was successfully extinguished by crews from the Texas Township, Oshtemo, and Mattawan fire departments.
