= Al Sabo =

Al Sabo can refer to:

- Al Sabo Preserve, in Texas Township, Michigan
- Albert F. Sabo (1920–2002), American lawyer and judge in Pennsylvania
- Alex Sabo (1910–2001), American baseball and football player
