= Margaret O'Brien (politician) =

American politician

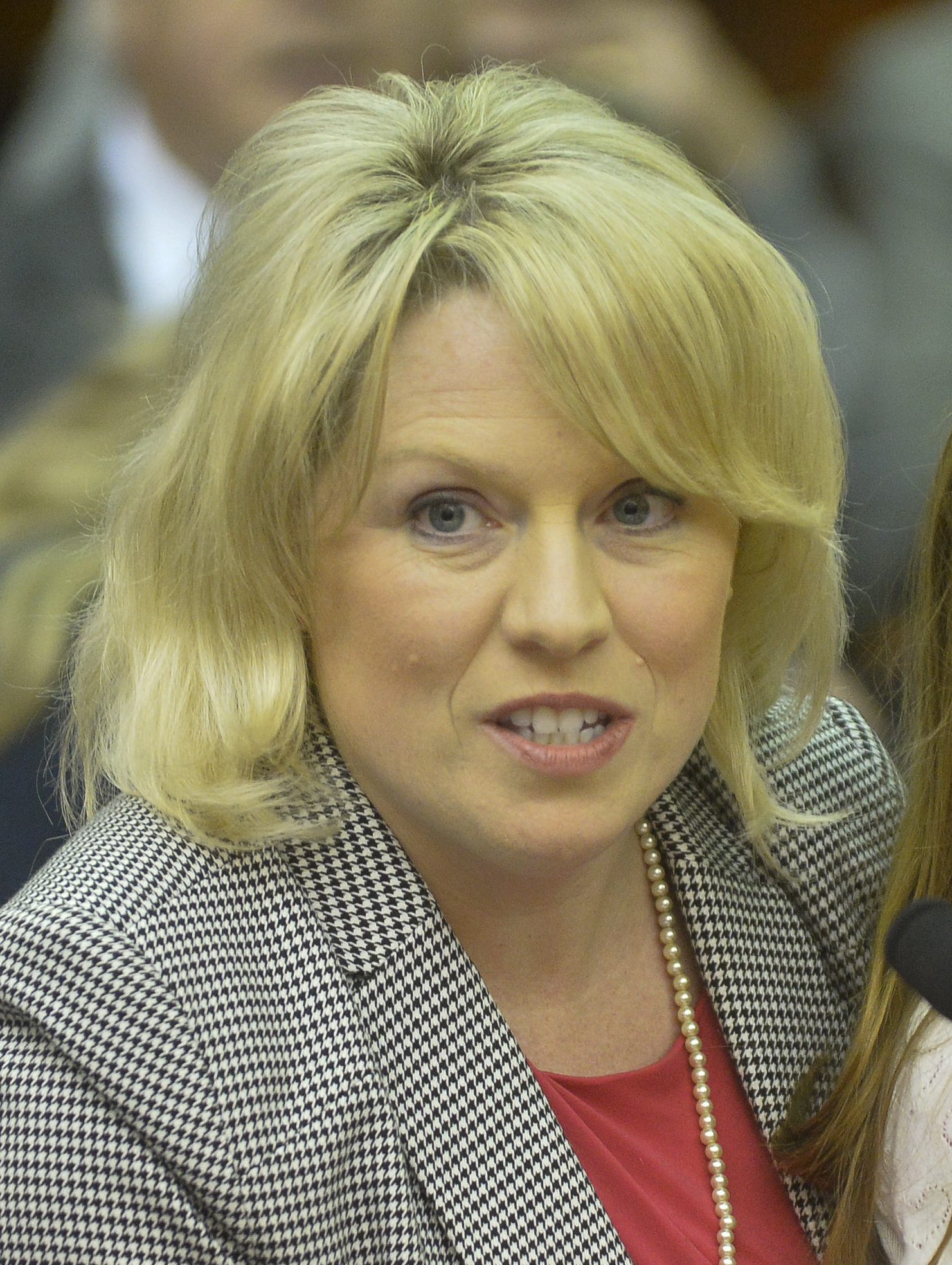
- O'Brien in 2014

Member of the Michigan Senate from the 20th district
- In office January 1, 2015 – December 31, 2018
- Preceded by: Tonya Schuitmaker
- Succeeded by: Sean McCann

Member of the Michigan House of Representatives from the 61st district
- In office January 1, 2011 – December 31, 2014
- Preceded by: Larry Deshazor
- Succeeded by: Brandt Iden

Personal details
- Born: November 20, 1973 (age 52) Kalamazoo, Michigan, U.S.
- Party: Republican
- Spouse: Nick O'Brien
- Children: 4
- Education: Michigan State University

Margaret O'Brien (born November 20, 1973) is a former member of the Michigan Senate and the Michigan House of Representatives. A member of the Republican Party, she represented a district based in Kalamazoo.

== Early life ==
O'Brien was born in Kalamazoo County to Richard and Katheleen (Crawford) Wilson. Her childhood was spent on dairy farms with her three brothers, first in Pavilion Township and then in Texas Township.

She attended Fulton and Indian Lake Elementary Schools in Vicksburg and graduated in 1991 from Mattawan High School, where she excelled in track and field and cross country. The women's track record for the 3200-meter relay, set in 1991, is still held by O'Brien and her teammates. In 1996, she earned a bachelor's degree in international relations from James Madison College at Michigan State University.

From 1995 to 2003, O'Brien was a social worker with Catholic Family Services. She then worked as a real estate agent at RE/MAX Advantage and served on the City Council of Portage, Michigan from 2003 to 2010. Her initial Council campaign was built on transparency and listening to citizen concerns. She continue to lives in Portage with her husband and dogs where she and her husband raised four children.

== Political career ==
O'Brien was first elected to the Michigan House in 2010 and became active on private property rights, education reform, adoption, and direct access to physical therapy. She was twice unanimously elected as Associate Speaker Pro Tem and often presided over sessions of the House. During her time in the house, she worked in a bipartisan manner to sponsor 25 public acts. In her farewell speech, she cited her family as her inspiration. She also expressed gratitude for the many relationships she formed on both sides of the aisle.

In 2014, she was elected to represent the 20th district in the Michigan Senate, defeating Democratic nominee Sean McCann and Libertarian nominee Lorence Wenke. In the Senate, she was unanimously elected as Assistant President Pro Tem and again frequently presided over sessions. She worked on bills to ensure the rights of people with service animals, to provide state IDs to the homeless, to protect victims of domestic violence, to prohibit female genital mutilation, to enact safe passing distances for vulnerable roadway users, and to train caregivers of seniors and people with disabilities.

O'Brien is known for her work to change Michigan's sexual assault laws in the aftermath of the Larry Nassar scandal, alongside advocates including Rachael Denhollander, Aly Raisman, Amanda Thomashow, Sterling Reithman, and Larissa Boyce.

During O'Brien's Senate tenure, her community dealt with many tragedies including the Uber shooter, the nation's biggest bicycle accident, the nation's largest winter time vehicle accident (I-94), and the first water system contaminated by PFAS (Parchment). While the events made national news, the pain felt by the victims and those in the community was overwhelming. By being available to impacted constituents and finding areas where greater protections could be implemented, O'Brien worked to bring state resources to best serve the community. Additionally, she sponsored 29 pieces of legislation that became public acts. Moreover, MIRS recognized her work by naming her Senator of the Year, the first woman to ever win the award since its inception.

In 2018, she lost a rematch with McCann. During her farewell speech, O'Brien noted the many partnerships she formed during her time in the legislature that worked to improve the lives of Michiganders. Additionally she shared the impact her family had upon her own life and how they inspired her.

When the Senate convened at its opening 2019 session, O'Brien was elected as secretary of the Michigan Senate, only the second woman to have held that post.
