= Alice Tomboulian =

American politician

Alice Warren Tomboulian

Member of the Michigan House of Representatives from the 61st district
- In office January 10, 1979 – January 14, 1981
- Preceded by: Melvin L. Larsen
- Succeeded by: Mat J. Dunaskiss

Personal details
- Born: Alice Warren; August 22, 1933 Ithaca, New York
- Died: December 1, 2021 (aged 88) Oakland Township, Michigan
- Party: Democratic
- Children: 3

Alice Tomboulian (née Warren, August 22, 1933 – December 1, 2021) was an American politician and environmentalist. She served one term in the Michigan House of Representatives.

== Early life and education ==
Tomboulian was born on August 22, 1933 in Ithaca, New York. She received a Bachelor's degree in mathematics from Cornell University in 1953. She also received her Master of Science in botany from the University of Illinois in 1955, and her Master of Education from Cornell in 1956. She married her husband, Paul, on June 21, 1957.

== Career ==
Tomboulian worked as an instructor at Oakland University from 1960 to 1961, and later from 1968 to 1972.

In 1978, she was elected to the Michigan House of Representatives, beating Republican challenger James Conlen by 45 votes. During her time in the House, she sponsored bills related to environmental protections, such as the Michigan Hazardous Waste Management Act and the Conservation and Historic Preservation Easement Act. She ran for re-election in 1980, but lost to Republican challenger Mat J. Dunaskiss.

Tomboulian was the founder of Resource Policy Services, which provided consulting on policies regarding the environment. She worked at the company from its founding in 1981 until 1999. From 1992 to 2016, she served as a member of the Oakland Township Parks and Recreation Commission.

== Death ==
Tomboulian died on December 1, 2021, at her home in Oakland Township.
