= Lawton Community Schools =

School district in Michigan, United States

Address
- 101 Primary Way Lawton, Van Buren, Michigan, 49065; United States

District information
- Grades: PreKindergarten-12
- Superintendent: Benjamin J. Bandfield
- Schools: 3
- Budget: $14,827,000 2022–2023 expenditures
- NCES District ID: 2621240

Students and staff
- Students: 1,027 (2024–2025)
- Teachers: 65.48 (on an FTE basis) (2024–2025)
- Staff: 141.68 FTE (2024–2025)
- Student–teacher ratio: 15.68 (2024–2025)

Other information
- Website: www.lawtoncs.org

Lawton Community Schools is a public school district in West Michigan. In Van Buren County, it serves Lawton and parts of the townships of Antwerp, Decatur, Paw Paw, and Porter. In Kalamazoo County, it serves part of Prairie Ronde Township.

== History ==
The first school within the district's boundaries was founded in 1841. A one-room schoolhouse was built in Lawton in 1855. A union school district was established in 1867 to unite Lawton's district with some of the outlying districts in Antwerp and Porter Townships, and a four-room school was built that same year. It was located on Nursery Street between Second and Third Streets. The first high school class graduated in 1873.

On February 28, 1915, the Union School burned. Its replacement opened that fall and would serve the district for many years as the only school in the district. A major expansion and renovation occurred in 1930. On February 7, 1955, Lawton Elementary opened, and the 1915 building became a middle/high school.

In 1962, completion of a district-wide renovation program was delayed by a labor dispute, forcing school to be held in temporary quarters around town. High school students used the former Paw Paw High School for several months.

A new high school, which used an open classroom concept, opened in fall 1973, and the 1915 school then became a middle school. The architect of the high school was Daverman and Associates. As the high school was undergoing renovation in 2003, the open classroom concept was explained in the yearbook that year: "When the present high school was first built it was looked on as cutting edge in the educational community. [The open classroom concept] was to be a more informal setting for students. It was thought that students would be less intimidated and be able to relax as they learned. The acoustics in the "Open Classroom" were supposed to keep the noise level down, and to deter distraction. Over the years, the "Open Classroom" concept was abandoned little by little. Dividers, or temporary walls were used to make classrooms."

The current Lawton Middle School was built in 2004, but was initially used by high school students while their school was being renovated. In January 2005, students moved back into the high school, and middle school students moved out of the 1915 school. The high school expansion and renovation project ended the open classroom concept, to the praise of students. "School is much improved due to the fact that we have walls now," a student told the local newspaper. "It's much more enclosed. We can hear our teachers."

In 2006, the William Strong Arboretum and Nature Trail was established on a wooded piece of school property. Michigan State University partnered with the district in making the trail with the aim of increasing environmental literacy. It was named after a science teacher and environmental club advisor.

== Schools ==
Schools in Lawton Community School District
School	Address	Notes
Lawton High School	101 Blue Pride Drive, Lawton	Grades 9–12. Built 1973, renovated 2005.
Lawton Middle School	100 Blue Pride Drive, Lawton	Grades 5–8. Built 2004.
Lawton Elementary	100 Primary Way, Lawton	Grades PreK-4. Built 1955.
