= Mattawan High School =

High school in Michigan, United States

Location
- 56720 Murray Street; Mattawan, Michigan 49071; United States; 42°12′45″N 85°47′24″W

Information
- Type: Public secondary school
- Established: 1911
- School district: Mattawan Consolidated School
- Superintendent: Randy Fleenor
- Principal: Tim Eastman
- Teaching staff: 57.79 (on an FTE basis)
- Grades: 9-12
- Enrollment: 1,126 (2024-2025)
- Student to teacher ratio: 19.48
- Colors: Blue; Gold
- Athletics conference: Southwestern Michigan Athletic Conference
- Nickname: Wildcats
- Website: hs.mattawanschools.org

Student assessments
- 2021–22 school year Change vs. prior year

M-STEP 11th grade proficiency rates (Science / Social Studies)
- Advanced %: 29.5 / 11.6
- Proficient %: 31.3 / 38.5
- PR. Proficient %: 16.4 / 42.2
- Not Proficient %: 22.9 / 7.6

Average test scores
- SAT Total: 1053.4 (▼ −15.9)

Mattawan High School is a public high school in Mattawan, Michigan. It is the only high school in the Mattawan Consolidated School and serves grades 9-12.

== Athletics ==
Mattawan High School's Wildcats compete in the Southwestern Michigan Athletic Conference. School colors are blue and gold. The following Michigan High School Athletic Association (MHSAA) sanctioned sports are offered:

- Baseball (boys)
- Basketball (girls and boys)
- Bowling (girls and boys)
- Competitive cheerleading (girls)
- Cross country (girls and boys)
- Football (boys)
- Golf (girls and boys)
- Ice hockey (boys)
- Lacrosse (girls and boys)
- Skiing (girls and boys)
- Soccer (girls and boys)
- Softball (girls)
- Swim and dive (girls and boys)
- Tennis (girls and boys)
- Track and field (girls and boys)
- Volleyball (girls)
- Wrestling (boys)

== Notable alumni ==
- Marian and Vivian Brown: Class of 1945 – Actress – aka "The San Francisco Twins"
- Noah Herron: Class of 2000 – College Football Northwestern University – Professional Football - the Pittsburgh Steelers, Green Bay Packers, Tampa Bay Buccaneers, New York Jets, and Cleveland Browns.
- Margaret O'Brien - Member of the Michigan Senate (2015-2018)<> and Michigan House of Representatives (2011-2014). Current Secretary of the Michigan Senate (2019-current)
