= Brandt Iden =

American politician

Member of the Michigan House of Representatives from the 61st district
- In office January 1, 2015 – December 31, 2020
- Preceded by: Margaret O'Brien
- Succeeded by: Christine Morse

Personal details
- Born: July 5, 1983 (age 43) Battle Creek, Michigan
- Party: Republican

Brandt Iden (born July 5, 1983) is an American politician who served in the Michigan House of Representatives from the 61st district from 2015 to 2020.

A Kalamazoo College graduate, Iden is in the commercial real estate business. He was on the Kalamazoo County Board of Commissioners for two terms before being elected to the Michigan House of Representatives in 2014. He won a close race for re-election in 2016. He won re-election in 2018, again by a narrow margin. He could not run for reelection in 2020 due to term limits. His final term ended on December 31, 2020.
