= Noah Herron =

American football player (born 1982)

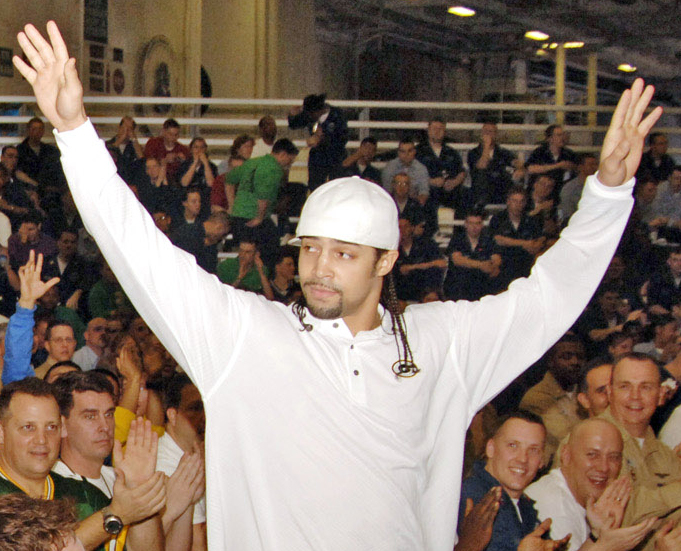
- Herron in 2007

No. 38, 23, 33
- Position: Running back

Personal information
- Born: April 3, 1982 (age 44); Milwaukee, Wisconsin, U.S.
- Listed height: 5 ft 11 in (1.80 m)
- Listed weight: 224 lb (102 kg)

Career information
- High school: Mattawan (Mattawan, Michigan)
- College: Northwestern
- NFL draft: 2005: 7th round, 244th overall pick

Career history
- Pittsburgh Steelers (2005); Green Bay Packers (2005–2007); Tampa Bay Buccaneers (2008); New York Jets (2009)*; Cleveland Browns (2009)*; New York Sentinels (2009); Hartford Colonials (2010)
- * Offseason or practice squad member only

Awards and highlights
- Second-team All-Big Ten (2004)

Career NFL statistics
- Rushing attempts: 85
- Rushing yards: 273
- Rushing touchdowns: 3
- Receptions: 29
- Receiving yards: 211
- Receiving touchdowns: 2
- Stats at Pro Football Reference

Noah Scott Herron (born April 3, 1982) is an American former professional football player who was a running back in the National Football League (NFL). He was selected by the Pittsburgh Steelers in the seventh round of the 2005 NFL draft. He played college football for the Northwestern Wildcats.

Herron was also a member of the Green Bay Packers, Tampa Bay Buccaneers, New York Jets, Cleveland Browns, New York Sentinels, and Hartford Colonials.

== Early life and college ==
Herron attended high school at Mattawan High School in Mattawan, Michigan. He attended Northwestern University and starred in football, where he was a consensus All-Big Ten Conference second-team honoree, the team Co-MVP, and Chicago Tribune Big Ten Conference Back of the Year. Overall, he finished his career with 462 carries for 2,524 yards (5.46 yards per car. avg.), and 26 touchdowns, 72 receptions for 781 yards (10.8 yards per reception) and 2 touchdowns, 16 kickoff returns for 231 yard (14.4 yards per kickoff ret. avg.), fourteen tackles, and one forced fumble.

== Professional career ==
=== Pittsburgh Steelers ===
Herron was selected by the Pittsburgh Steelers in the seventh round (244th overall) of the 2005 NFL draft.

=== Green Bay Packers ===
He was signed off of the Steelers' practice squad by the Green Bay Packers. In his rookie season he rushed for 123 yards on 48 attempts for a 2.6-yard average and two touchdowns. Following the season, the Packers kept him as a third string back behind Ahman Green and Vernand Morency. In his second season, Herron rushed for 150 yards on 37 attempts for a 4.1-yard average to go with 29 receptions for 211 yards and three total touchdowns.

In the 2007 season, Herron was expected to compete with Morency and Brandon Jackson for the starting running back position. However, he was placed on Injured reserve with a sprained knee on September 2, ending his season.

Herron returned to the Packers during the 2008 training camp but was released on August 30 during final cuts.

=== Tampa Bay Buccaneers ===
Herron was signed by the Tampa Bay Buccaneers on November 19, 2008, after running back Earnest Graham was placed on injured reserve. He was released on December 17, 2008.

=== New York Jets ===
Herron was signed to a future contract by the New York Jets on January 7, 2009. He was released on February 26, 2009.

=== Cleveland Browns ===
Herron was signed by the Cleveland Browns on March 18, 2009. He was released on September 5 during final roster cuts.

== Personal life ==
In June 2008, Herron thwarted a would-be burglar by hitting him with a post he unscrewed from his bed. The injury resulted in the burglar being taken to the hospital. Herron was not injured during the break-in. A second burglary suspect was arrested at Herron's house during the incident.
