= 2008 United States Senate election in Michigan =

- November 4, 2008
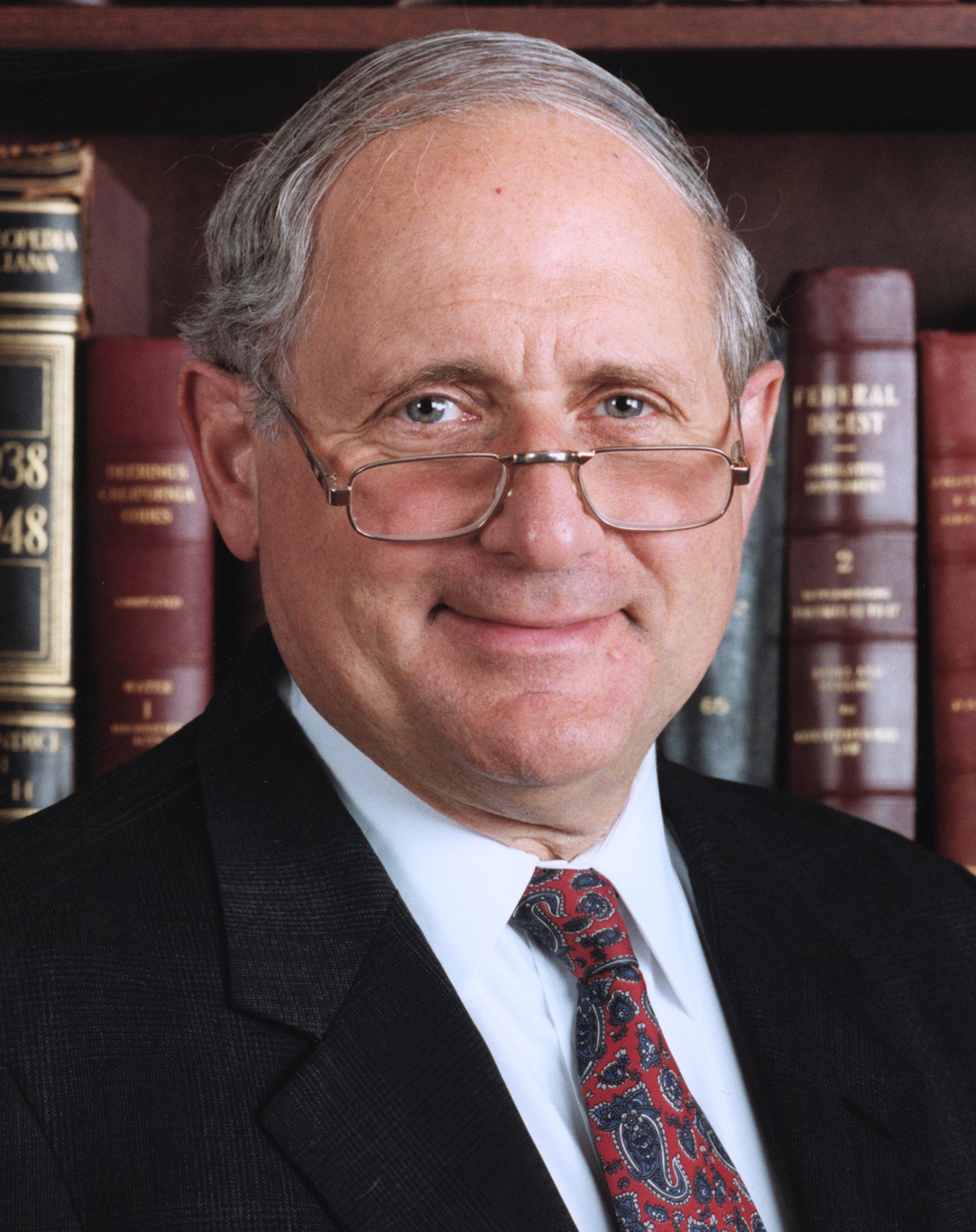

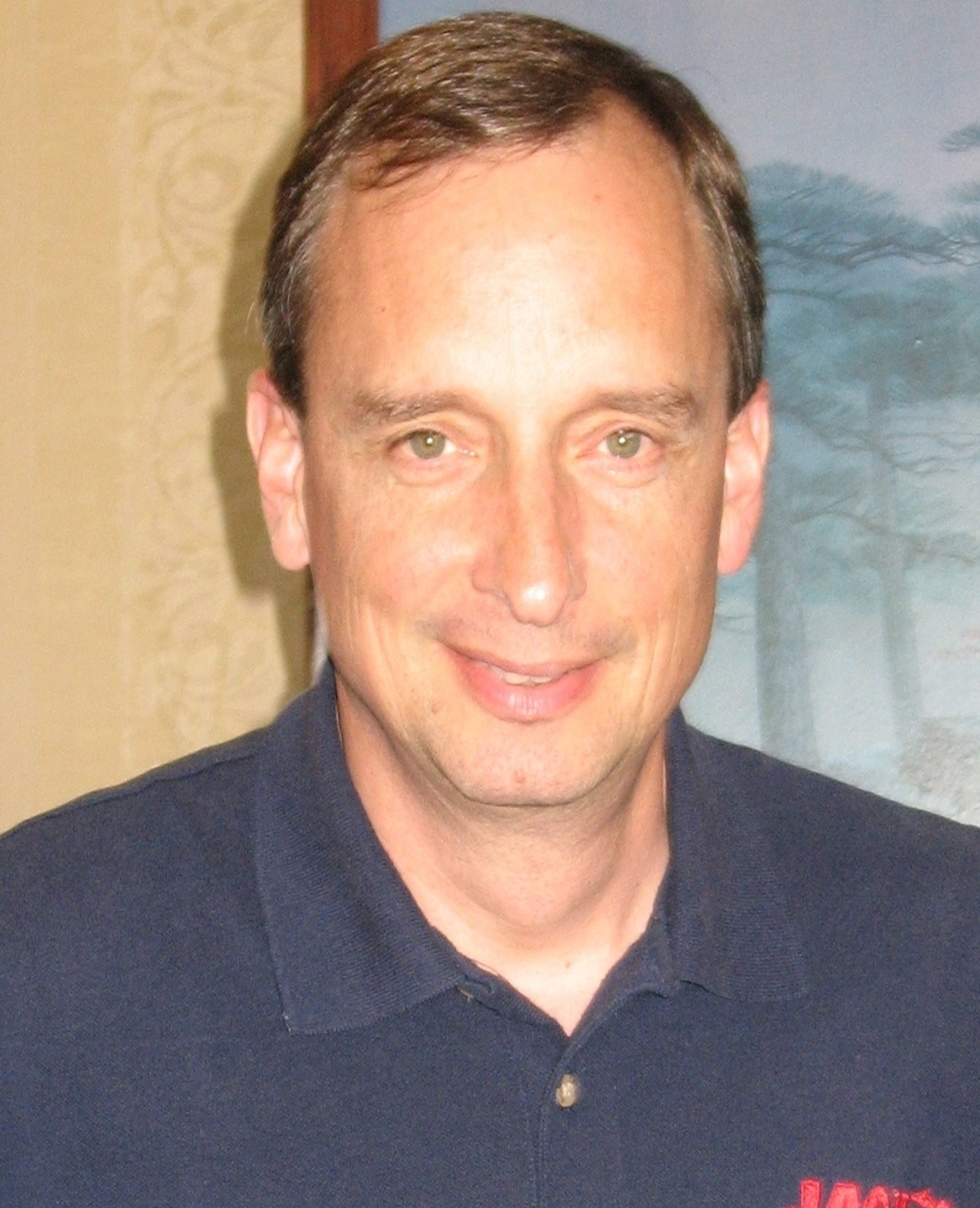
| Nominee | Carl Levin | Jack Hoogendyk |
| Party | Democratic | Republican |
| Popular vote | 3,038,386 | 1,641,070 |
| Percentage | 62.66% | 33.85% |
- Levin: 40–50% 50–60% 60–70% 70–80% 80–90% >90% Hoogendyk: 40–50% 50–60% 60–70% 70–80% 80–90% Tie
U.S. senator before election
Carl Levin
Democratic
Elected U.S. Senator
Carl Levin
Democratic

The 2008 United States Senate election in Michigan was held on November 4, 2008. Incumbent Democratic U.S. Senator Carl Levin won a sixth and final term. Levin carried 77 of Michigan's 83 counties, and carried every congressional district.

The only counties Levin did not carry were Allegan, Barry, Hillsdale, Livingston, Missaukee, and Ottawa.

== General election ==
=== Candidates ===
- Scott Boman (Libertarian)
- Doug Dern (Natural Law)
- Jack Hoogendyk, state representative from Kalamazoo (Republican)
- Carl Levin, incumbent U.S. senator (Democratic)
- Harley Mikkelson (Green)
- Michael Nikitin (U.S. Taxpayers)

=== Campaign ===
Levin's 2002 opponent Andrew Raczkowski considered running again, but military commitments forced him to drop out. State Representative Jack Hoogendyk declared his candidacy to challenge Levin. Troy engineer Bart Baron also ran.

Baron apparently failed to qualify for the August 5, 2008 party primary ballot in the Michigan secretary of state's office. Therefore, only Hoogendyk was listed on the Republican side in the primary election. Levin was unopposed on the Democratic side. The filing deadline for candidates to run was May 13.

Minor party candidates who ran included Harley Mikkelson of the Green Party, Scotty Boman of the Libertarian Party, Michael Nikitin of the U.S. Taxpayers Party, and Doug Dern of the Natural Law Party. Levin, who maintained a huge fundraising advantage over his opponents, easily won re-election.

=== Predictions ===
| Source | Ranking | As of |
|---|---|---|
| The Cook Political Report | Safe D | October 23, 2008 |
| CQ Politics | Safe D | October 31, 2008 |
| Rothenberg Political Report | Safe D | November 2, 2008 |
| Real Clear Politics | Safe D | November 4, 2008 |

=== Polling ===
| Poll source | Dates administered | Carl Levin (D) | Jack Hoogendyk (R) |
|---|---|---|---|
| Rasmussen Reports | October 8, 2008 | 61% | 36% |
| Public Policy Polling | September 29 – October 1, 2008 | 50% | 32% |
| Strategic Vision | September 22–24, 2008 | 57% | 29% |
| Detroit News | September 14–17, 2008 | 56% | 28% |
| Rasmussen Reports | September 18, 2008 | 57% | 38% |
| Strategic Vision | September 5–7, 2008 | 58% | 28% |
| Public Policy Polling | September 6–7, 2008 | 51% | 36% |
| EPIC-MRA/Detroit News | August 18–21, 2008 | 59% | 27% |
| Public Policy Polling(PPP) | July 23–27, 2008 | 54% | 35% |
| Rasmussen Reports | July 10, 2008 | 59% | 36% |
| Public Policy Polling | June 21–22, 2008 | 54% | 32% |
| Rasmussen Reports | June 11, 2008 | 55% | 35% |
| Rasmussen Reports | May 7, 2008 | 54% | 37% |

=== Debates ===
On October 19, WGVU Public television hosted a senatorial debate to which only Democratic Senator Carl Levin and Republican State Representative Jack Hoogendyk were invited. They debated topics such as the economy, immigration, and foreign policy.

Levin blamed job loss in Michigan on President Bush, while Hoogendyk blamed Levin. Levin supported a federal bailout of the auto industry, while Hoogendyk opposed the idea.

The event, which was moderated by WZZM TV 13's news anchor Peter Ross, was met with protest by supporters of excluded candidates. One of the protesters was Libertarian candidate Boman, who asserted that he met the station's qualifications. WGVU required the candidates to show at least 5% support in a statewide scientific poll, but Boman said no statewide poll had been done that included him. An exclusive WXYZ poll included all of the candidates, but only contacted respondents in the 7th and 9th Congressional district. Boman also claimed that public broadcasters should have invited the other candidates, since they are supported by tax dollars.

Levin and Hoogendyk met again the following day (October 20), for a forum hosted by the Detroit Economic Club.

== Results ==
Levin was declared the winner right when the polls closed in Michigan. He won all but six of Michigan's 83 counties. Unsurprisingly, he won major metropolitan areas such as Wayne County home of Detroit, and Ingham County, home of Lansing. He became the first Democratic senator since Donald Riegle in 1982 to carry Kent County, home of Grand Rapids. When combining the suburban and rural counties, it was too much for Hoogendyk to overcome. Levin's 3,038,386 votes were the most received by any political candidate in the state's history.

General election results
| Party | Candidate | Votes | % | ±% |
|---|---|---|---|---|
| Democratic | Carl Levin (incumbent) | 3,038,386 | 62.66% | +2.05% |
| Republican | Jack Hoogendyk | 1,641,070 | 33.85% | −4.04% |
| Libertarian | Scotty Boman | 76,347 | 1.57% | n/a |
| Green | Harley Mikkelson | 43,440 | 0.90% | +0.14% |
| U.S. Taxpayers | Michael Nikitin | 30,827 | 0.64% | n/a |
| Natural Law | Doug Dern | 18,550 | 0.38% | +0.05% |
| Majority | | 1,397,316 | 28.82% | +6.10% |
| Turnout | | 4,848,620 | | |
| Democratic hold | | Swing | | |

=== Counties that flipped from Republican to Democratic ===
- Kent (largest city: Grand Rapids)
- Cass (largest city: Dowagiac)
- Berrien (largest city: Niles)
- St. Joseph (largest city: Sturgis)

== See also ==
- 2008 United States Senate elections
