= Larry DeShazor =

American politician

Member of the Michigan House of Representatives from the 61st district
- In office January 1, 2009 – January 1, 2011
- Preceded by: Jack Hoogendyk
- Succeeded by: Margaret O'Brien

Personal details
- Party: Republican
- Education: University of New Orleans

Larry DeShazor was an American politician from Michigan. A member of the Michigan State House of Representatives, DeShazor left the state house in 2011 after an unsuccessful run for the State Senate.

== Political life ==
DeShazor ran for the Michigan State House of Representatives in 2008 and was elected, becoming one of two African American Republicans elected to the Michigan House of Representatives since 1904, the other being Paul H. Scott.
