= Schoolcraft, Michigan =

- Village
- Village of Schoolcraft
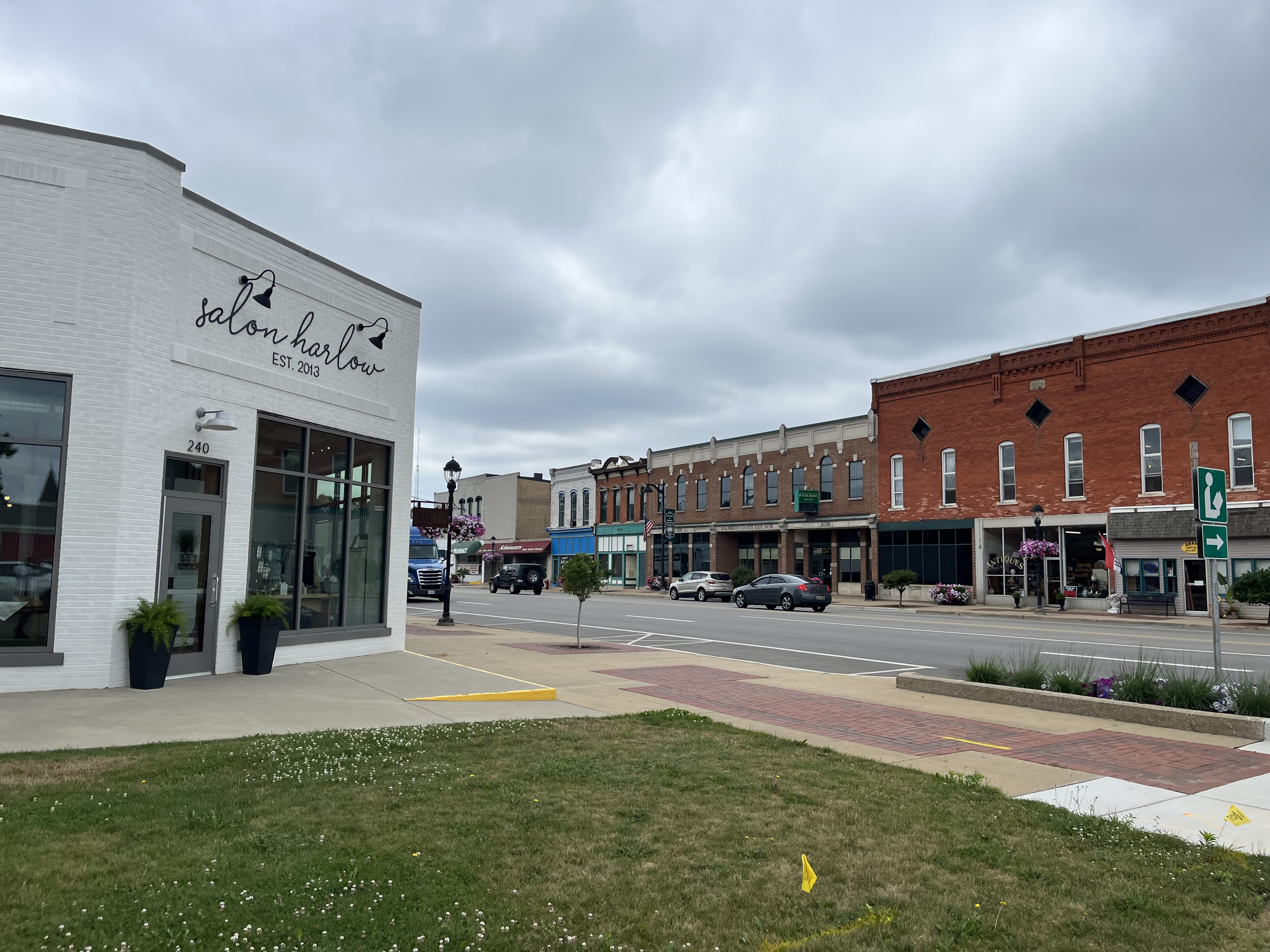

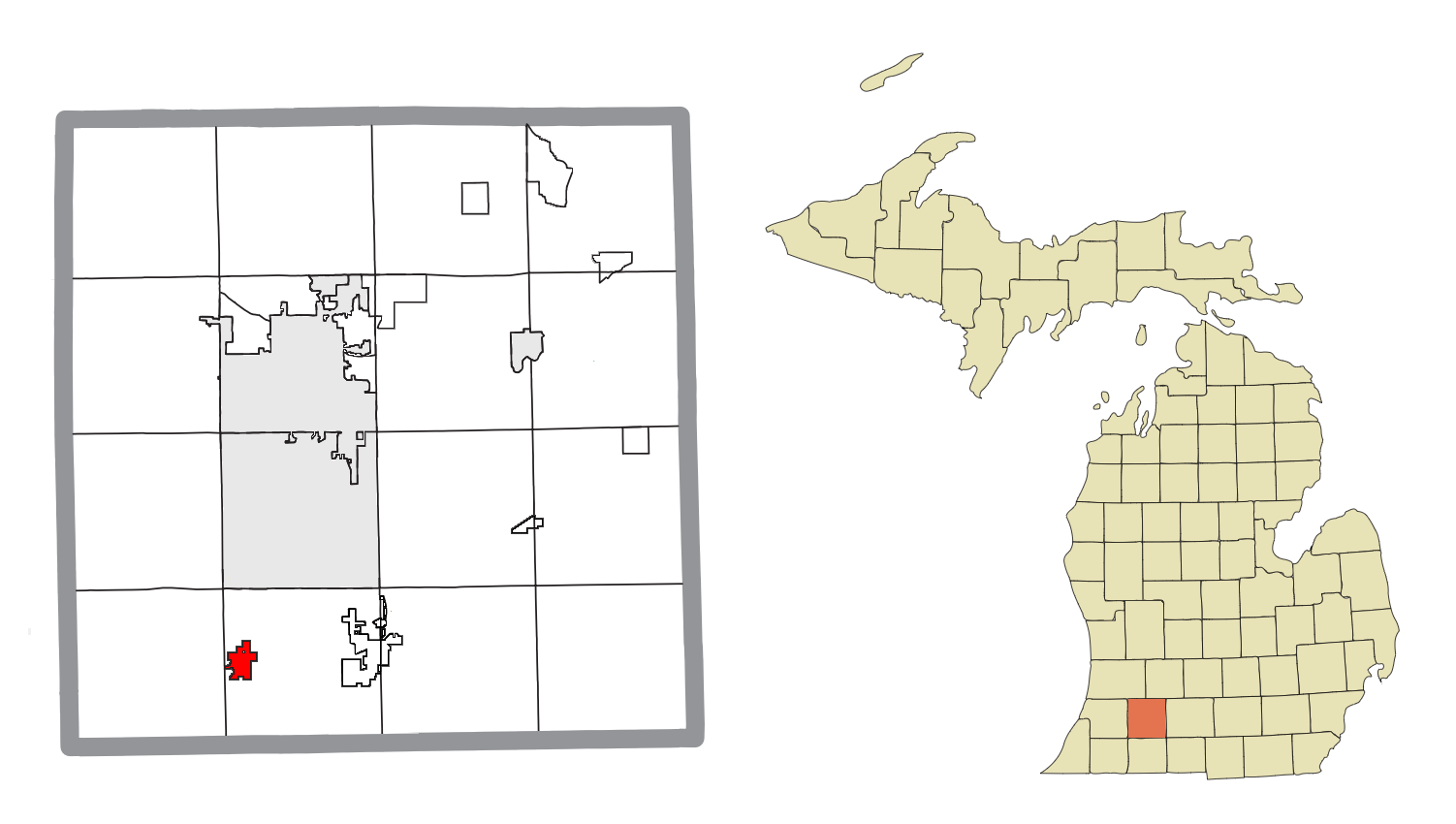
- Location within Kalamazoo County

- Location within the state of Michigan Location within the United States
- Coordinates: 42°6′55″N 85°38′7″W
- Country: United States
- State: Michigan
- County: Kalamazoo
- Township: Schoolcraft

Area
  - Total: 0.98 sq mi (2.54 km^{2})
  - Land: 0.98 sq mi (2.54 km^{2})
  - Water: 0 sq mi (0.00 km^{2})
- Elevation: 879 ft (268 m)

Population (2020)
  - Total: 1,466
  - Density: 1,493.1/sq mi (576.49/km^{2})
- Time zone: UTC-5 (Eastern (EST))
  - Summer (DST): UTC-4 (EDT)
- ZIP code: 49087
- Area code: 269
- FIPS code: 26-71860
- GNIS feature ID: 0637419
- Website: https://villageofschoolcraft.com/

Schoolcraft is a village in Kalamazoo County, Michigan, United States. The village is located in Schoolcraft Township approximately 13 miles (21 km) south of Kalamazoo on U.S. Route 131. As of the 2020 census, Schoolcraft had a population of 1,466. The village is named in honor of geographer, geologist, and ethnologist Henry Schoolcraft. The village is known for the annual Schoolcraft 4th of July celebration, which has been held nearly every year since 1925.

== Geography ==
According to the United States Census Bureau, the village has a total area of 0.98 square miles (2.54 km^{2}), all land. Schoolcraft is located on a prairie, and much of the land outside of the village is used as farm land, with the primary crops being corn and soybeans.

== Demographics ==
Historical population
Census	Pop.	Note	%±
1870	932		—
1880	951		2.0%
1890	836		−12.1%
1900	859		2.8%
1910	816		−5.0%
1920	731		−10.4%
1930	833		14.0%
1940	823		−1.2%
1950	1,078		31.0%
1960	1,205		11.8%
1970	1,277		6.0%
1980	1,359		6.4%
1990	1,517		11.6%
2000	1,587		4.6%
2010	1,525		−3.9%
2020	1,466		−3.9%
U.S. Decennial Census

=== 2010 census ===
As of the census of 2010, there were 1,525 people, 616 households, and 405 families residing in the village. The population density was 1,556.1 inhabitants per square mile (600.8/km^{2}). There were 661 housing units at an average density of 674.5 per square mile (260.4/km^{2}). The racial makeup of the village was 95.6% White, 1.0% African American, 1.0% Native American, 0.6% Asian, 0.5% from other races, and 1.4% from two or more races. Hispanic or Latino of any race were 2.0% of the population.

There were 616 households, of which 34.6% had children under the age of 18 living with them, 49.7% were married couples living together, 10.6% had a female householder with no husband present, 5.5% had a male householder with no wife present, and 34.3% were non-families. 28.9% of all households were made up of individuals, and 12.3% had someone living alone who was 65 years of age or older. The average household size was 2.48 and the average family size was 3.05.

The median age in the village was 38.1 years. 26.4% of residents were under the age of 18; 7.5% were between the ages of 18 and 24; 25.1% were from 25 to 44; 28% were from 45 to 64; and 12.9% were 65 years of age or older. The gender makeup of the village was 49.4% male and 50.6% female.

=== 2000 census ===
As of the census of 2000, there were 1,587 people, 615 households, and 418 families residing in the village. The population density was 1,703.2 inhabitants per square mile (657.6/km^{2}). There were 645 housing units at an average density of 692.2 per square mile (267.3/km^{2}). The racial makeup of the village was 96.09% White, 0.38% African American, 0.19% Native American, 0.44% Asian, 0.38% from other races, and 2.52% from two or more races. Hispanic or Latino of any race were 1.07% of the population.

There were 615 households, out of which 38.5% had children under the age of 18 living with them, 55.9% were married couples living together, 9.1% had a female householder with no husband present, and 31.9% were non-families. 27.3% of all households were made up of individuals, and 12.4% had someone living alone who was 65 years of age or older. The average household size was 2.57 and the average family size was 3.19.

In the village, the population was spread out, with 29.6% under the age of 18, 6.2% from 18 to 24, 32.2% from 25 to 44, 19.5% from 45 to 64, and 12.5% who were 65 years of age or older. The median age was 36 years. For every 100 females, there were 92.4 males. For every 100 females age 18 and over, there were 85.4 males.

The median income for a household in the village was $45,380, and the median income for a family was $54,205. Males had a median income of $37,500 versus $27,639 for females. The per capita income for the village was $20,223. About 3.7% of families and 6.9% of the population were below the poverty line, including 7.0% of those under age 18 and 9.2% of those age 65 or over.

== History ==
Euro-American settlement in the Schoolcraft area dates to 1828 (nine years before Michigan's admission to the Union), when Bazel Harrison moved his family from Ohio to present-day Prairie Ronde Township, becoming the first settler in the future Kalamazoo County. The village itself was established in 1831 by surveyor (and future statesman) Lucius Lyon, who had first visited the area as a surveyor under government contract in 1823. Recorded on October 5, 1831, Schoolcraft was the first town in Kalamazoo County. Lyon named the village for his friend Henry Schoolcraft. Schoolcraft was a key member of the 1820 Cass Expedition, organized by territorial governor Lewis Cass to explore the Michigan Territory; the expedition played an important role in encouraging settlement of the territory.

Territorial roads from Schoolcraft to the mouth of the Black River were approved in 1833 and to Edwardsville in 1834. State roads to Edwardsburg, St. Joseph were approved by the Michigan legislature in the 1835–36 session. By Act of State Legislature March 14, 1840, two state roads from Schoolcraft were approved for construction. One road was to be built to Abscota (also found as Abscot), a post office in Calhoun County, Township 4 South, Range 7 West at the corners of Section 5, 6, 7, 8. John Kelly and E.L. Brown of Kalamazoo and Salmon Walker of Calhoun County were appointed to oversee this route. Another road was to be built from Schoolcraft to Albion with E. Larkin Brown and Albert E. Bull of Schoolcraft and Jesse Crowel of Albion as commissionors to lay out and establish said road. In 1844, a state road from Battle Creek to Schoolcraft was authorized. In 1845, a state road from Schoolcraft connecting to the Territorial Road was authorized.

Schoolcraft was incorporated as a General Law Village on January 4, 1866. It was reincorporated March 12, 1869, and received its new charter in 1875.

== Local Historic Sites ==
The Schoolcraft home of Dr. Nathan Thomas served as a "station" on the Underground Railroad. Dr. Thomas, the first doctor in Kalamazoo County and a Quaker who avidly supported and led abolitionist efforts in Michigan, first built the house in 1835 on the corner of Cass St. and Centre St. Between 1840 and 1860, it is estimated that Dr. Thomas and his wife Pamela Brown Thomas sheltered between 1,000 and 1,500 fugitive slaves on their way to Canada. Dr. Thomas built a new house in 1868 and the original house was moved to its present site on Cass St. east of U.S. Route 131. The house is listed on the National Register of Historic Places and is a registered Michigan Historical Site.

The Schoolcraft United Methodist Church has stood on the corner of Grand Street and Clay Street in Schoolcraft since the early 1850s. The congregation was organized in Prairie Ronde Township in 1832. Its first chapel, called the Ebenezer Episcopal Church of Prairie Ronde, built in 1836, was the first church building of any denomination constructed north of the St. Joseph River.

Cooper's Island is an approximately 23-acre (93,000 m^{2}) woodland located about 1/4 mile west of U.S. Route 131 on West Eliza St. Containing a rich and rare assortment of mesic forest plants and trees, the woods are the remnant of the Big Island on Prairie Ronde, an island of forest in the midst of prairie at the time of settlement. Famous as the setting for James Fenimore Cooper's 1848 frontier novel The Oak Openings, Cooper's Island is a listed Michigan Historical Site.

The Schoolcraft Ladies Library (at 163 Hayward St.), built in 1896, is also a state listed site. The Ladies Library Association had been founded in 1879 to provide educational opportunities to women in the community (there were no state educational institutions in the area until Western Normal College, now Western Michigan University, was established in Kalamazoo in 1903).

== Schools ==
Schoolcraft is served by the Schoolcraft Community Schools school district.

- School Mascot: Eagle, or the Schoolcraft Eagles
- School Colors: Purple and Gold

Schoolcraft High School Michigan High School Athletic Association State Team Champions

- Boys' Track: 1959
- Girls' Cross-country: 1992 (Class D)
- Boys' Golf: 1996, 1998, 2002 (Division 4)
- Football: 1988 (Class D), 1989 (Class C), 2001 (Division 6)
- Girls' Volleyball: 2008 (Class C)
- Boys' Basketball: 2011, 2022 (Class C)

== Notable people ==
- Benjamin H. Southworth – Physician, surgeon and American football player.

== See also ==
- List of municipalities in Michigan

== Sources ==
- Swartz, Mary Jane (1990). So I'm Told: The Nineteenth Century in Schoolcraft, Michigan. Berrien Springs, MI: Hardscrabble Books. p. 240. ISBN 0-915056-22-4.
