= Denise Mentzer =

American politician from Michigan

Member of the Michigan House of Representatives from the 61st district
- Incumbent
- Assumed office January 1, 2023
- Preceded by: Christine Morse

Personal details
- Born: Mount Clemens, Michigan U.S.
- Party: Democratic
- Education: Baker College (BA)

Denise Mentzer is an American politician serving as a member of the Michigan House of Representatives since 2023, representing the 61st district. She is a member of the Democratic Party.

== Political career ==
Mentzer was first elected in the 2022 election. She was reelected in 2024.

In 2025, Mentzer broke party lines to vote in favor of a resolution calling for the federal ban on transgender girls in women's sports under Trump to be enforced in the state of Michigan.
