= Marian and Vivian Brown =

American celebrity twins

The Brown Twins
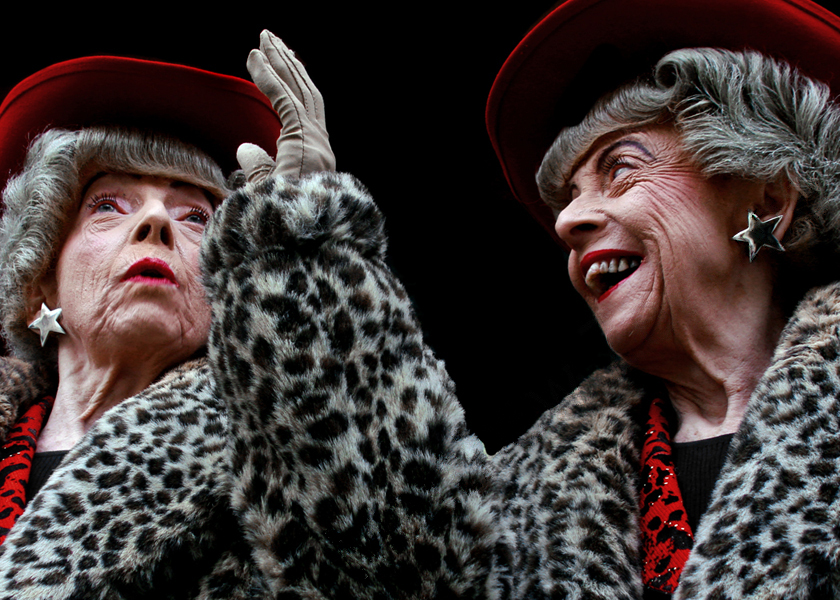
- Marian and Vivian Brown

Marian Brown
- Born: Marian B. Brown; January 25, 1927; Kalamazoo, Michigan, U.S.
- Died: November 20, 2014 (aged 87); San Mateo, California, U.S.
- Occupations: Actress, television personality, commercial spokesperson, former bank worker
- Years active: 1960s–2014

Vivian Brown
- Born: Vivian A. Brown; January 25, 1927; Kalamazoo, Michigan, U.S.
- Died: January 9, 2013 (aged 85); San Francisco, California, U.S.
- Occupations: Actress, television personality, commercial spokesperson, former legal secretary
- Years active: 1960s–2013

Marian B. Brown (January 25, 1927 – November 20, 2014) and Vivian A. Brown (January 25, 1927 – January 9, 2013) were American identical twin actresses who also appeared on television talk shows and television commercials. They became celebrity icons in San Francisco, known as the San Francisco Twins, renowned for their appearance in media with signature identically bright snappy outfits and hats atop meticulously coiffed hair. They were voted second as San Francisco's "Best Local Character" in 2000. They often ate dinner at one of the front tables at Uncle Vito's restaurant, just below the crest of Nob Hill, San Francisco.

== Biography ==
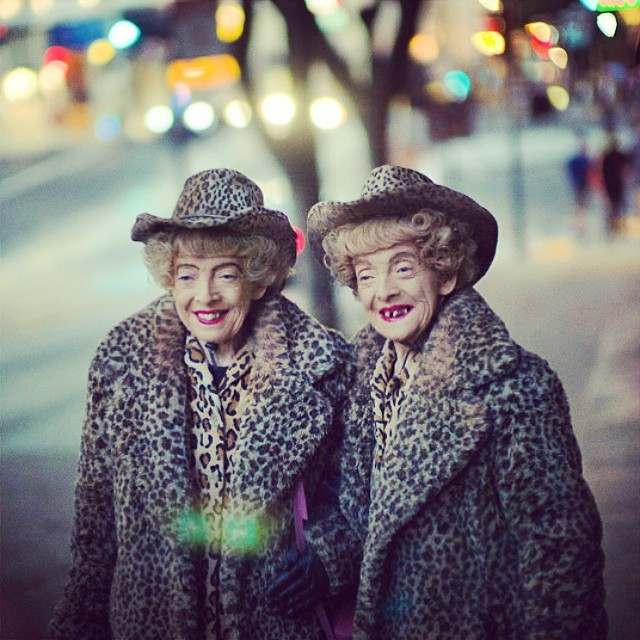
Marian and Vivian Brown (left to right) in the early 2010s

Marian B. Brown and twin sister Vivian A. Brown were born in Kalamazoo, Michigan. Vivian was the elder by eight minutes. They grew up in Mattawan, Michigan, where they attended Mattawan High School and in 1945 graduated as co-valedictorians, giving the valedictory speech together. They went on to earn matching degrees in business education from Western Michigan University in Kalamazoo, and then worked as teachers for three years.

At the age of 43, the Browns left Michigan for San Francisco in 1970 with the intent of escaping the hot summers and long, cold winters. After they arrived in San Francisco, Vivian became a legal secretary and Marian worked at a bank.

In Kalamazoo, the Brown twins were often seen in the Kalamazoo Mall, dressed identically. Both were petite at 5 feet 1 inch (1.55 m) tall and weighing 98 pounds (44 kg). They were always seen together. They dressed alike, walked in lockstep and ate at the same speed, even lifting their forks in unison. Neither married, but they said they had double-dated twins they met at a twins' convention.

They never broke suit until Vivian was diagnosed with forgetfulness due to Alzheimer's disease. After a slip and fall in the summer of 2012, she ended up in Davies Hospital and her condition deteriorated. The costs of medical care caused financial problems for the twins, and San Franciscans and charities united to help keep them together. On January 9, 2013, Vivian died aged 85 at the Rhoda Goldman Plaza Assisted Living Centre in the Western Addition of San Francisco. Marian died on November 20, 2014, at a hospice in San Mateo, California, aged 87. The twins' ashes are stored in two pale blue urns embossed with orchids at the San Francisco Columbarium.

== Celebrity ==
For more than 40 years, the Brown twins were an entertainment fixture of the San Francisco social scene. They appeared in public in identical outfits, becoming neighborhood celebrities. They gained wide exposure in a 1988 television advertisement for Reebok, which led to appearances in talk shows and modeling in advertisements. They appeared on television with Richard Simmons, Tom Snyder and Vicki Lawrence. They were featured in over 25 television advertisements over the years. Corporate advertisements in which they appeared included IBM, San Francisco Chronicle, Pay Less, Virgin Atlantic, Joe Boxer, Macy's, AT&T, Dell Computers, and Apple Inc. The Brown Twins appear in an establishing shot in the film 9 to 5, ostensibly set in Los Angeles.
