= Prairie Ronde Township, Michigan =

- Civil township
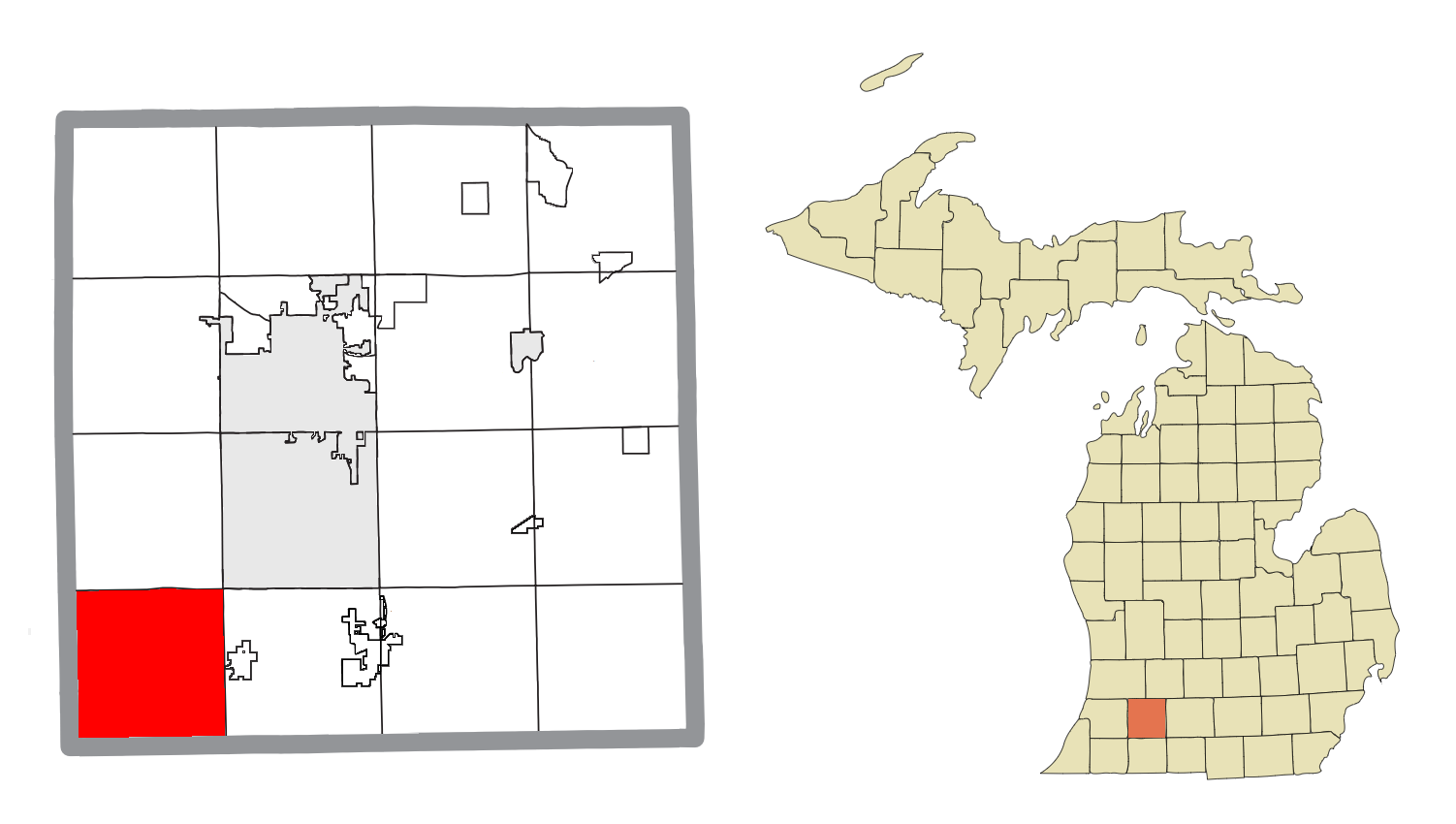
- Location within Kalamazoo County

- Location within the state of Michigan Location within the United States
- Coordinates: 42°6′31″N 85°42′9″W
- Country: United States
- State: Michigan
- County: Kalamazoo

Area
  - Total: 36.4 sq mi (94.4 km^{2})
  - Land: 35.8 sq mi (92.8 km^{2})
  - Water: 0.62 sq mi (1.6 km^{2})
- Elevation: 879 ft (268 m)

Population (2020)
  - Total: 2,369
  - Density: 66.1/sq mi (25.5/km^{2})
- Time zone: UTC-5 (Eastern (EST))
  - Summer (DST): UTC-4 (EDT)
- FIPS code: 26-077-66200
- GNIS feature ID: 1626941
- Website: prairierondetwp.net

Prairie Ronde Township is a civil township located in the southwestern corner of Kalamazoo County in the U.S. state of Michigan. The population was 2,369 at the 2020 census.

Prairie Ronde is the birthplace of the women's suffragist Olympia Brown.

== Geography ==
The township is bordered by Van Buren County to the west, Cass County at the southwest corner, and St. Joseph County to the south. Kalamazoo, the county seat, is 18 miles (29 km) to the northeast.

According to the United States Census Bureau, the township has a total area of 36.4 square miles (94.4 km^{2}), of which 35.8 square miles (92.8 km^{2}) are land and 0.62 square miles (1.6 km^{2}), or 1.73%, are water.

There are no incorporated or unincorporated communities within the boundaries of the township. A village named Shirland, to be located on Section 25 (near the present-day Olde Mill Golf Course), was platted and recorded in 1831, but it never developed. The village of Schoolcraft is just to the east in Schoolcraft Township, and all of Prairie Ronde Township is served by the Schoolcraft ZIP code (49087).

Surface water features include Harrison and Paw Paw Lakes in the northern part of the township. Much of the township lies within the drainage area of Flowerfield Creek, which is part of the Rocky River sub-watershed, itself part of the larger St. Joseph River watershed. The Michigan Nature Association maintains a 20-acre (81,000 m^{2}) nature sanctuary along Flowerfield Creek in Prairie Ronde Township.

== History ==
The township is named for its distinctive geographic feature, the Prairie Ronde, a 14,000-acre (57 km^{2}) grassland and the largest of the eight prairies in what would become Kalamazoo County. The name Prairie Ronde (French for "round meadow") is said to have been given by French explorer Robert Sieur de la Salle during an overland crossing of the region in 1680. (Some scholars, however, place LaSalle's route across northern Kalamazoo County, a journey which would not have brought him across the Prairie Ronde.)

Present-day Prairie Ronde Township was the first part of Kalamazoo County to be settled by European-Americans. The first white settler was Bazel Harrison, a nephew of revolutionary leader Benjamin Harrison and first cousin of U.S. President William Henry Harrison. Originally of Virginia, Harrison arrived with his family from Ohio on November 5, 1828.

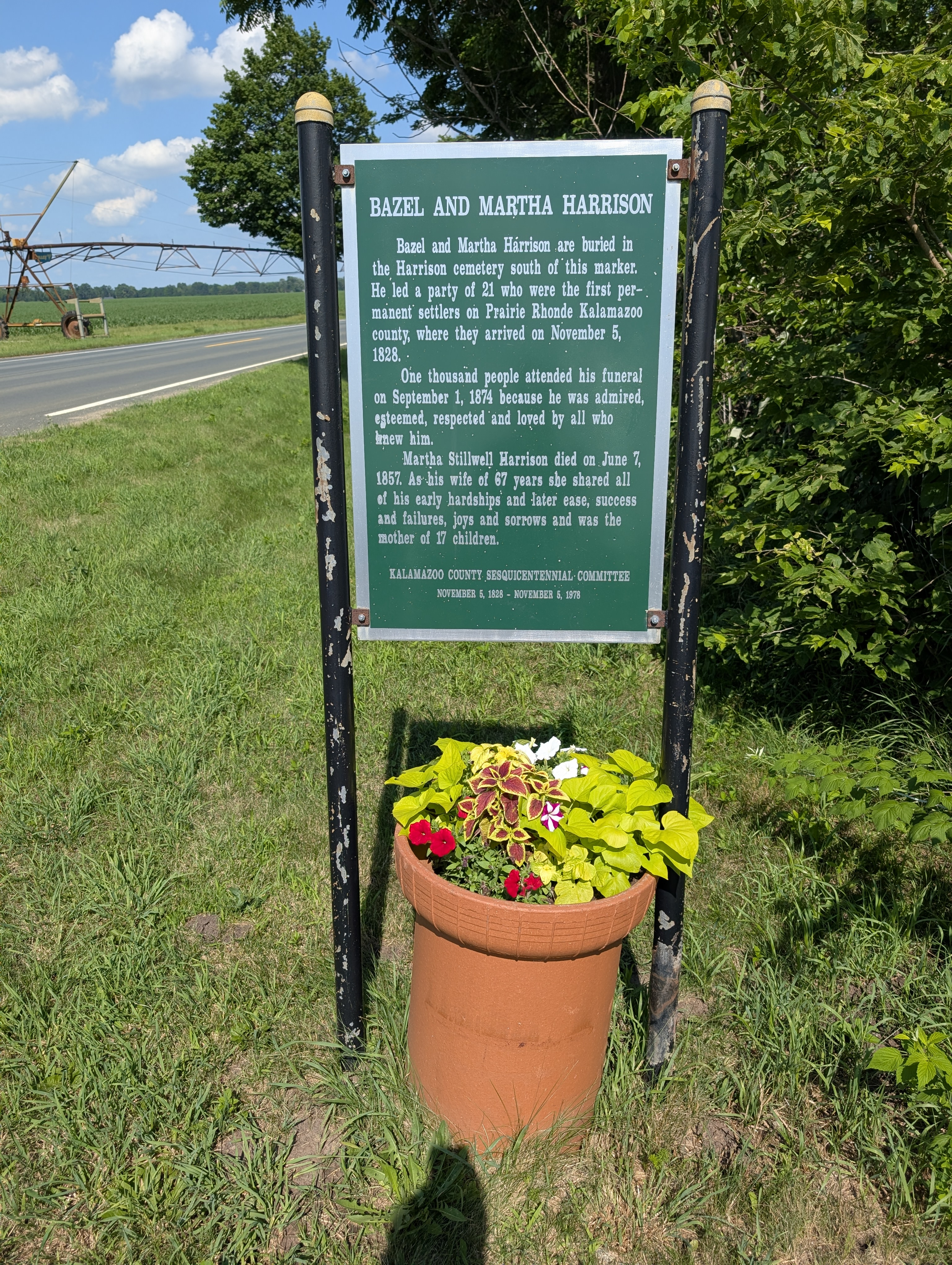
Sign commemorating Bazel and Martha Harrison, among first permanent settlers of Prairie Rhonde

At the time of settlement, Prairie Ronde was a part of St. Joseph County and in the township of Brady, which included all of future Kalamazoo and Barry counties and a large part of Michigan's Lower Peninsula to the north. Kalamazoo County was set off with its present boundaries in 1829, and the southern half organized as Brady Township in 1830. Prairie Ronde was set off from Brady Township as a separate township with its present limits in May 1836.

At the time of European settlement, the area was inhabited by the Potawatomi people. The Potawatomi were forcibly removed from Kalamazoo County in October 1840.

A Methodist congregation was organized in Prairie Ronde in 1832. In 1836 they built a small chapel near Harrison Lake called the Ebenezer Episcopal Church of Prairie Ronde. This was the first church building of any denomination built north of the St. Joseph River. Around 1850, the congregation moved to Schoolcraft, where it continues today as the Schoolcraft United Methodist Church.

== Demographics ==
As of the census of 2000, there were 2,086 people, 707 households, and 601 families residing in the township. The population density was 58.3 inhabitants per square mile (22.5/km^{2}). There were 733 housing units at an average density of 20.5 per square mile (7.9/km^{2}). The racial makeup of the township was 97.84% White, 0.29% African American, 0.38% Native American, 0.29% Asian, 0.19% from other races, and 1.01% from two or more races. Hispanic or Latino of any race were 0.48% of the population. The most common reported ancestries for township residents are German (26.8%), Dutch (12.8%), and Irish (11.8%).

There were 707 households, out of which 46.0% had children under the age of 18 living with them, 78.5% were married couples living together, 4.7% had a female householder with no husband present, and 14.9% were non-families. 12.4% of all households were made up of individuals, and 3.4% had someone living alone who was 65 years of age or older. The average household size was 2.95 and the average family size was 3.21.

In the township the population was spread out, with 32.2% under the age of 18, 4.1% from 18 to 24, 32.1% from 25 to 44, 25.5% from 45 to 64, and 6.1% who were 65 years of age or older. The median age was 35 years. For every 100 females, there were 104.1 males. For every 100 females age 18 and over, there were 101.1 males.

The median income for a household in the township was $65,385, and the median income for a family was $67,458. Males had a median income of $48,074 versus $27,038 for females. The per capita income for the township was $23,431. About 2.6% of families and 4.2% of the population were below the poverty line, including 1.9% of those under age 18 and 7.0% of those age 65 or over.

== Education ==
Most of the township belongs to the Schoolcraft Community Schools. The northwestern part of the township is within the Mattawan Consolidated School and a smaller section along the western edge of the township is within the Lawton Community Schools.

== Listed historic sites ==
Prairie Ronde Township has one site listed on the National Register of Historic Places. The Fanckboner-Nichols Farmstead (5992 W. VW Avenue) was established in 1838 by William and Elizabeth Crose Fanckboner, who had arrived with their five children from near Belvidere, New Jersey, the previous year. Still owned by Fanckboner descendants, the family's Greek Revival farmhouse, built c. 1840, along with later outbuildings, stands in a small farmstead area at one corner of the 30-acre (120,000 m^{2}) farm property on the corner of West VW Avenue and S 10th Street. The farmstead, added to the Register in 2007, is preserved as an illustration of the lives of the early settlers on the Prairie Ronde.

== Sources ==
- Swartz, Mary Jane (1990). So I'm Told: The Nineteenth Century in Schoolcraft, Michigan. Berrien Springs, MI: Hardscrabble Books. p. 240. ISBN 0-915056-22-4.
