= Flowerfield Township, Michigan =

- Township
- Location within the state of Michigan Flowerfield Township, Michigan (the United States)
- Coordinates: 42°2′3″N 85°42′46″W
- Country: United States
- State: Michigan
- County: St. Joseph

Area
  - Total: 35.9 sq mi (92.9 km^{2})
  - Land: 35.8 sq mi (92.7 km^{2})
  - Water: 0.039 sq mi (0.1 km^{2})
- Elevation: 879 ft (268 m)

Population (2020)
  - Total: 1,587
  - Density: 44.3/sq mi (17.1/km^{2})
- Time zone: UTC-5 (Eastern (EST))
  - Summer (DST): UTC-4 (EDT)
- FIPS code: 26-29140
- GNIS feature ID: 1626288
- Website: https://www.flowerfieldtwp.net/

Flowerfield Township is a civil township of St. Joseph County in the U.S. state of Michigan. The population was 1,587 at the 2020 census.

== Geography ==
According to the United States Census Bureau, the township has a total area of 35.8 square miles (93 km^{2}), of which 35.8 square miles (93 km^{2}) is land and 0.1 square miles (0.26 km^{2}) (0.14%) is water.

== Demographics ==
As of the census of 2000, there were 1,592 people, 571 households, and 460 families residing in the township. The population density was 44.5 inhabitants per square mile (17.2/km^{2}). There were 605 housing units at an average density of 16.9 per square mile (6.5/km^{2}). The racial makeup of the township was 96.04% White, 0.38% African American, 0.88% Native American, 0.82% Asian, 0.69% from other races, and 1.19% from two or more races. Hispanic or Latino of any race were 1.44% of the population.

There were 571 households, out of which 35.0% had children under the age of 18 living with them, 69.9% were married couples living together, 5.3% had a female householder with no husband present, and 19.4% were non-families. 16.1% of all households were made up of individuals, and 6.3% had someone living alone who was 65 years of age or older. The average household size was 2.77 and the average family size was 3.05.

In the township the population was spread out, with 26.6% under the age of 18, 6.8% from 18 to 24, 29.6% from 25 to 44, 26.9% from 45 to 64, and 10.1% who were 65 years of age or older. The median age was 38 years. For every 100 females, there were 106.2 males. For every 100 females age 18 and over, there were 107.6 males.

The median income for a household in the township was $46,897, and the median income for a family was $51,458. Males had a median income of $36,723 versus $26,202 for females. The per capita income for the township was $19,969. About 5.0% of families and 7.8% of the population were below the poverty line, including 11.2% of those under age 18 and 3.3% of those age 65 or over.
