= Mattawan, Michigan =

- Village
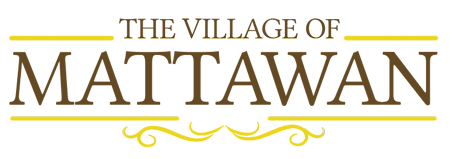
- Logo

- Location of Mattawan, Michigan
- Coordinates: 42°13′8″N 85°47′25″W
- Country: United States
- State: Michigan
- County: Van Buren

Area
  - Total: 3.84 sq mi (9.94 km^{2})
  - Land: 3.81 sq mi (9.88 km^{2})
  - Water: 0.023 sq mi (0.06 km^{2})
- Elevation: 869 ft (265 m)

Population (2020)
  - Total: 2,550
  - Density: 668.8/sq mi (258.21/km^{2})
- Time zone: UTC-5 (Eastern (EST))
  - Summer (DST): UTC-4 (EDT)
- ZIP code: 49071
- Area code: 269
- FIPS code: 26-52380
- GNIS feature ID: 0631736
- Website: https://www.mattawanmi.org/

Mattawan is a village in Antwerp Township, Van Buren County of the U.S. state of Michigan. As of the 2020 census, Mattawan had a population of 2,550.

== Geography ==
According to the United States Census Bureau, the village has a total area of 3.83 square miles (9.92 km^{2}), of which 3.81 square miles (9.87 km^{2}) is land and 0.02 square miles (0.05 km^{2}) is water.

== Demographics ==
Historical population
Census	Pop.	Note	%±
1880	240		—
1970	1,569		—
1980	2,143		36.6%
1990	2,456		14.6%
2000	2,536		3.3%
2010	1,997		−21.3%
2020	2,550		27.7%
U.S. Decennial Census

=== 2020 census ===
As of the 2020 census, Mattawan had a population of 2,550. The median age was 36.0 years. 25.7% of residents were under the age of 18 and 13.1% of residents were 65 years of age or older. For every 100 females there were 96.8 males, and for every 100 females age 18 and over there were 96.5 males age 18 and over.

95.2% of residents lived in urban areas, while 4.8% lived in rural areas.

There were 1,034 households in Mattawan, of which 36.1% had children under the age of 18 living in them. Of all households, 42.1% were married-couple households, 18.4% were households with a male householder and no spouse or partner present, and 26.3% were households with a female householder and no spouse or partner present. About 27.0% of all households were made up of individuals and 11.0% had someone living alone who was 65 years of age or older.

There were 1,084 housing units, of which 4.6% were vacant. The homeowner vacancy rate was 2.3% and the rental vacancy rate was 4.4%.

Racial composition as of the 2020 census
Race	Number	Percent
White	2,231	87.5%
Black or African American	37	1.5%
American Indian and Alaska Native	11	0.4%
Asian	25	1.0%
Native Hawaiian and Other Pacific Islander	5	0.2%
Some other race	47	1.8%
Two or more races	194	7.6%
Hispanic or Latino (of any race)	132	5.2%

=== 2010 census ===
As of the census of 2010, there were 1,997 people, 788 households, and 533 families living in the village. The population density was 524.1 inhabitants per square mile (202.4/km^{2}). There were 873 housing units at an average density of 229.1 per square mile (88.5/km^{2}). The racial makeup of the village was 93.9% White, 2.2% African American, 0.6% Native American, 0.3% Asian, 0.4% from other races, and 2.7% from two or more races. Hispanic or Latino of any race were 3.9% of the population.

There were 788 households, of which 37.8% had children under the age of 18 living with them, 45.2% were married couples living together, 16.4% had a female householder with no husband present, 6.1% had a male householder with no wife present, and 32.4% were non-families. 27.2% of all households were made up of individuals, and 9.4% had someone living alone who was 65 years of age or older. The average household size was 2.53 and the average family size was 3.06.

The median age in the village was 36.5 years. 27.6% of residents were under the age of 18; 8.8% were between the ages of 18 and 24; 25.2% were from 25 to 44; 27% were from 45 to 64; and 11.5% were 65 years of age or older. The gender makeup of the village was 47.0% male and 53.0% female.

=== 2000 census ===
As of the census of 2000, there were 2,536 people, 961 households, and 711 families living in the village. The population density was 615.4 inhabitants per square mile (237.6/km^{2}). There were 1,024 housing units at an average density of 248.5 per square mile (95.9/km^{2}). The racial makeup of the village was 94.16% White, 1.89% African American, 0.35% Native American, 0.32% Asian, 1.22% from other races, and 2.05% from two or more races. Hispanic or Latino of any race were 3.12% of the population.

There were 961 households, out of which 42.5% had children under the age of 18 living with them, 52.0% were married couples living together, 16.1% had a female householder with no husband present, and 26.0% were non-families. 21.0% of all households were made up of individuals, and 7.4% had someone living alone who was 65 years of age or older. The average household size was 2.64 and the average family size was 3.04.

In the village, the population was spread out, with 30.0% under the age of 18, 9.4% from 18 to 24, 31.2% from 25 to 44, 20.8% from 45 to 64, and 8.6% who were 65 years of age or older. The median age was 33 years. For every 100 females, there were 92.7 males. For every 100 females age 18 and over, there were 90.5 males.

The median income for a household in the village was $88,241, and the median income for a family was $98,259. Males had a median income of $75,967 versus $64,647 for females. The per capita income for the village was $67,971. About 3.2% of families and 3.8% of the population were below the poverty line, including .8% of those under age 18 and 1.6% of those age 65 or over.

== Education ==
Education in the village of Mattawan is provided by the Mattawan Consolidated School District (K-12), which consists of the Early Elementary School (grades K-2), the Later Elementary School (grades 3–5), the Middle School (grades 6–8), and the Mattawan High School (grades 9–12).

The Mattawan Consolidated School system is unusual because it is a unified campus. All of the school buildings and sports facilities are on one campus.

== Notable people ==
- The San Francisco Twins
- Chris Ballingall, professional baseball player
- Noah Herron, running back for the Green Bay Packers of the National Football League
- Andy Roach, professional hockey player for the St. Louis Blues of the National Hockey League
