= Oshtemo Township, Michigan =

- Charter township
- Oshtemo Charter Township
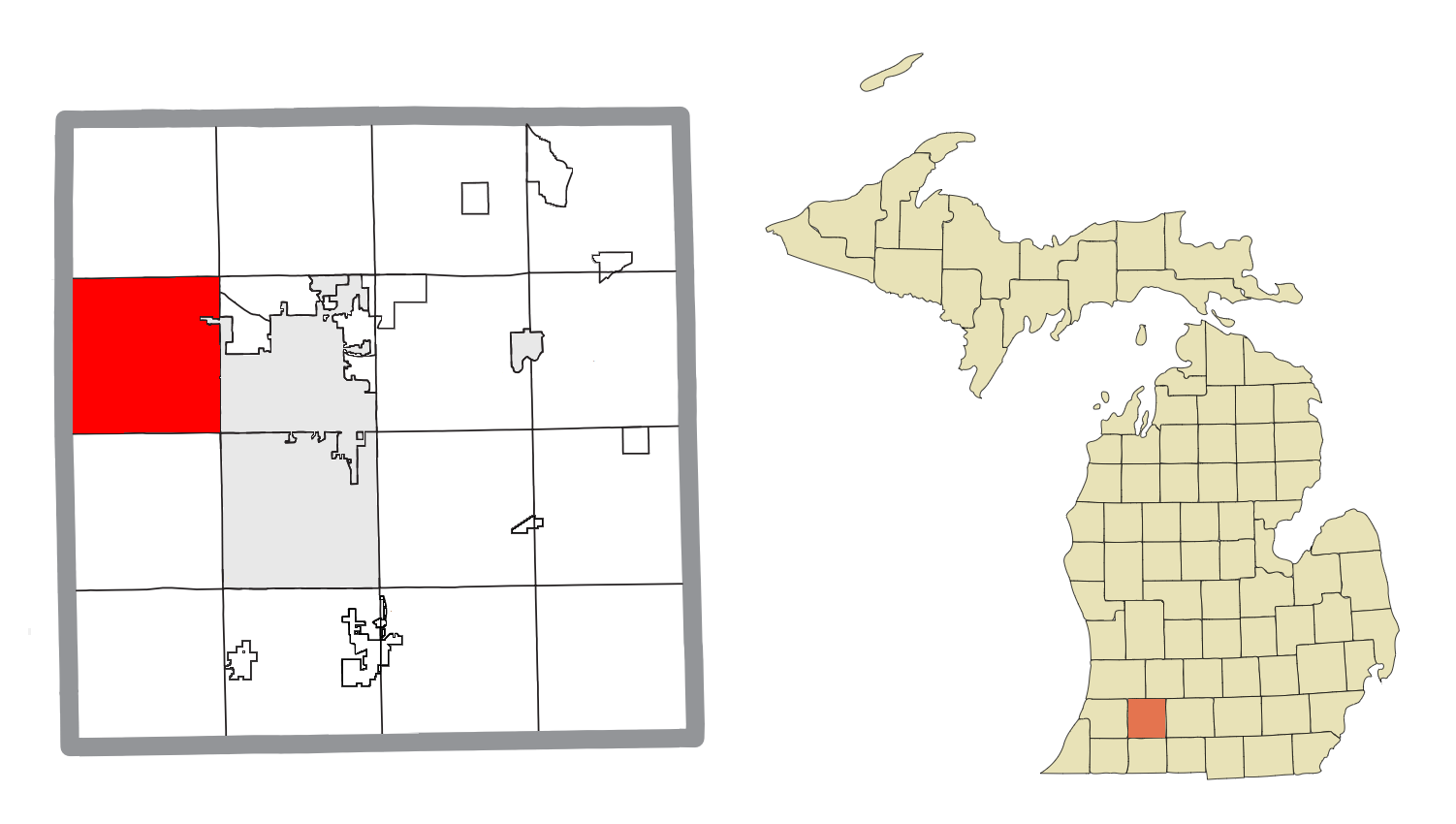
- Location within Kalamazoo County

- Location within the state of Michigan Location within the United States
- Coordinates: 42°17′0″N 85°40′56″W
- Country: United States
- State: Michigan
- County: Kalamazoo

Area
  - Total: 36.0 sq mi (93.2 km^{2})
  - Land: 35.9 sq mi (92.9 km^{2})
  - Water: 0.12 sq mi (0.3 km^{2})
- Elevation: 945 ft (288 m)

Population (2020)
  - Total: 23,747
  - Density: 662/sq mi (256/km^{2})
- Time zone: UTC-5 (Eastern (EST))
  - Summer (DST): UTC-4 (EDT)
- ZIP code: 49009, 49077 (Oshtemo post office boxes only)
- Area code: 269
- FIPS code: 26-61400
- GNIS feature ID: 1626865
- Website: www.oshtemo.org

Oshtemo Charter Township is a charter township of Kalamazoo County in the U.S. state of Michigan. The 2020 census recorded a population of 23,747, up from 21,705 at the 2010 census. The township was organized in 1839.

== Geography ==
According to the United States Census Bureau, the township has a total area of 36.0 square miles (93.2 km^{2}), of which 35.9 square miles (92.9 km^{2}) are land and 0.1 square miles (0.3 km^{2}), or 0.37%, are water.

Oshtemo Township is located at the Kalamazoo County - Van Buren County line, adjacent to and west of the city of Kalamazoo and Kalamazoo Township; adjacent to and north of Texas Charter Township and adjacent to and south of Alamo Township.

A Superfund site is located in the township at K & L Avenue Landfill.

== Demographics ==
As of the census of 2000, there were 17,003 people, 7,551 households, and 4,024 families residing in the township. The population density was 472.8 inhabitants per square mile (182.5/km^{2}). There were 7,987 housing units at an average density of 222.1 per square mile (85.8/km^{2}). The racial makeup of the township was 84.97% White, 9.39% African American, 0.30% Native American, 2.26% Asian, 0.02% Pacific Islander, 1.08% from other races, and 1.97% from two or more races. Hispanic or Latino of any race were 2.33% of the population.

There were 7,551 households, out of which 24.7% had children under the age of 18 living with them, 41.2% were married couples living together, 9.1% had a female householder with no husband present, and 46.7% were non-families. 33.9% of all households were made up of individuals, and 8.7% had someone living alone who was 65 years of age or older. The average household size was 2.19 and the average family size was 2.87.

In the township the population was spread out, with 20.8% under the age of 18, 17.1% from 18 to 24, 27.6% from 25 to 44, 21.1% from 45 to 64, and 13.3% who were 65 years of age or older. The median age was 33 years. For every 100 females, there were 89.4 males. For every 100 females age 18 and over, there were 86.1 males.

The median income for a household in the township was $38,433, and the median income for a family was $57,515. Males had a median income of $40,798 versus $28,257 for females. The per capita income for the township was $24,249. About 7.6% of families and 13.8% of the population were below the poverty line, including 15.1% of those under age 18 and 7.2% of those age 65 or over.
