= Mat J. Dunaskiss =

American politician (born 1951)

Mat J. Dunaskiss (born September 21, 1951) is an American politician. A member of the Republican Party, he served in the Michigan House of Representatives from 1981 to 1990.
