= Alamo Township, Michigan =

- Civil township
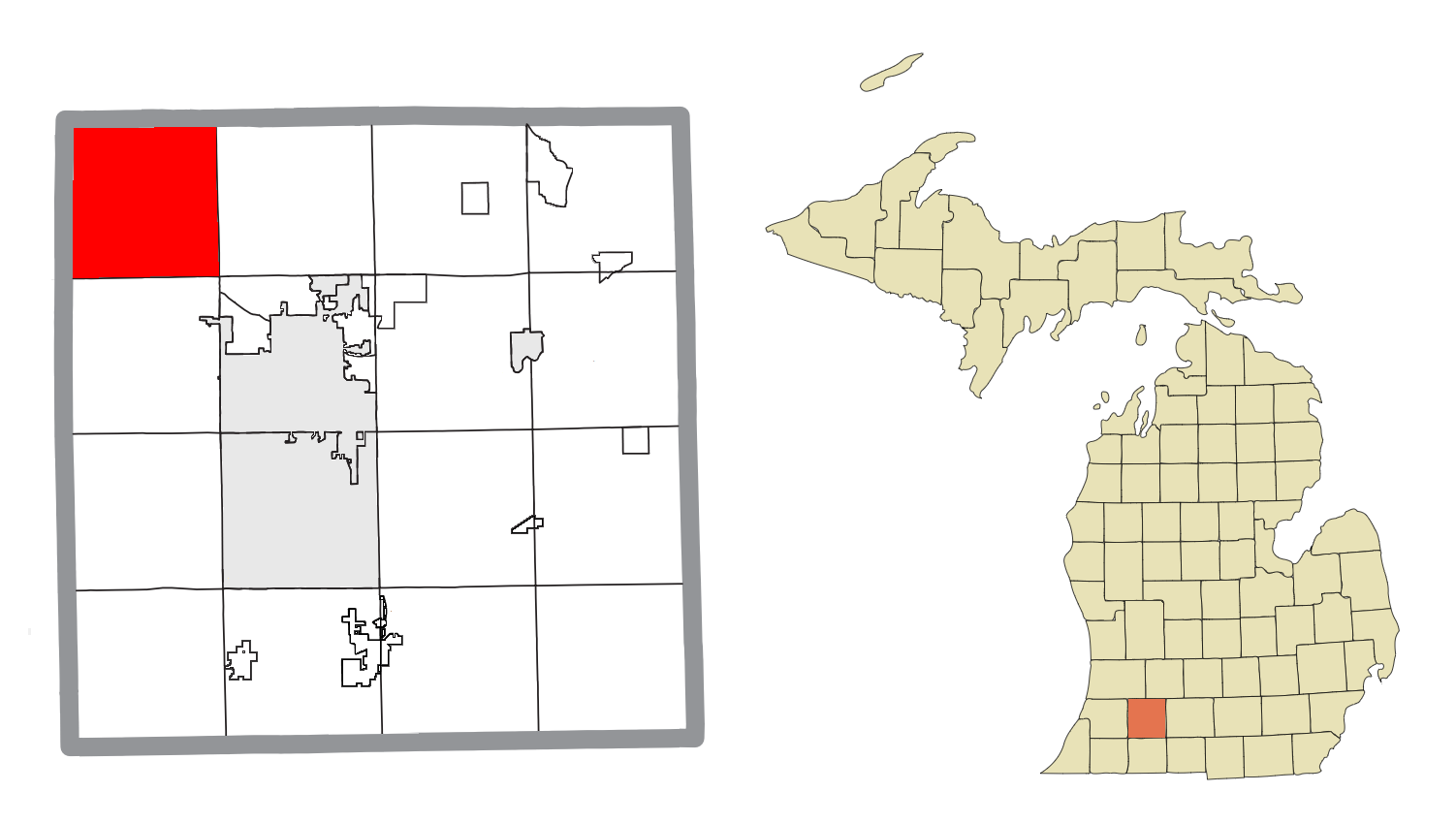
- Location within Kalamazoo County

- Location within the state of Michigan Location within the United States
- Coordinates: 42°22′51″N 85°41′38″W
- Country: United States
- State: Michigan
- County: Kalamazoo

Area
  - Total: 36.4 sq mi (94.3 km^{2})
  - Land: 36.2 sq mi (93.8 km^{2})
  - Water: 0.19 sq mi (0.5 km^{2})
- Elevation: 771 ft (235 m)

Population (2020)
  - Total: 3,805
  - Density: 105/sq mi (40.6/km^{2})
- Time zone: UTC-5 (Eastern (EST))
  - Summer (DST): UTC-4 (EDT)
- FIPS code: 26-00840
- GNIS feature ID: 1625810
- Website: alamotownshipmi.gov

Alamo Township is a civil township of Kalamazoo County in the U.S. state of Michigan. As of the 2020 census, the township population was 3,805.

== Geography ==
The township is in the northwest corner of Kalamazoo County and is bordered by Allegan County to the north and Van Buren County to the west. U.S. Route 131 passes through the east side of the township, leading south to Kalamazoo and north to Grand Rapids.

According to the United States Census Bureau, the township has a total area of 36.4 square miles (94.3 km^{2}), of which 36.2 square miles (93.8 km^{2}) are land and 0.2 square miles (0.5 km^{2}), or 0.53%, are water.

== Demographics ==
As of the census of 2000, there were 3,820 people, 1,378 households, and 1,091 families residing in the township. The population density was 105.3 inhabitants per square mile (40.7/km^{2}). There were 1,424 housing units at an average density of 39.2 per square mile (15.1/km^{2}). The racial makeup of the township was 96.60% White, 0.97% African American, 0.47% Native American, 0.52% Asian, 0.21% from other races, and 1.23% from two or more races. Hispanic or Latino of any race were 0.89% of the population.

There were 1,378 households, out of which 33.5% had children under the age of 18 living with them, 70.9% were married couples living together, 5.7% had a female householder with no husband present, and 20.8% were non-families. 18.0% of all households were made up of individuals, and 7.3% had someone living alone who was 65 years of age or older. The average household size was 2.69 and the average family size was 3.05.

In the township the population was spread out, with 26.0% under the age of 18, 5.6% from 18 to 24, 25.8% from 25 to 44, 27.2% from 45 to 64, and 15.5% who were 65 years of age or older. The median age was 41 years. For every 100 females, there were 95.1 males. For every 100 females age 18 and over, there were 93.0 males.

The median income for a household in the township was $50,409, and the median income for a family was $58,964. Males had a median income of $40,536 versus $29,566 for females. The per capita income for the township was $22,116. About 4.3% of families and 5.2% of the population were below the poverty line, including 7.6% of those under age 18 and 7.2% of those age 65 or over.

== History ==
In 2021, the Township Board closed the Alamo Township Museum.
