= Schoolcraft Township, Kalamazoo County, Michigan =

Schoolcraft Township, Michigan
- Civil township
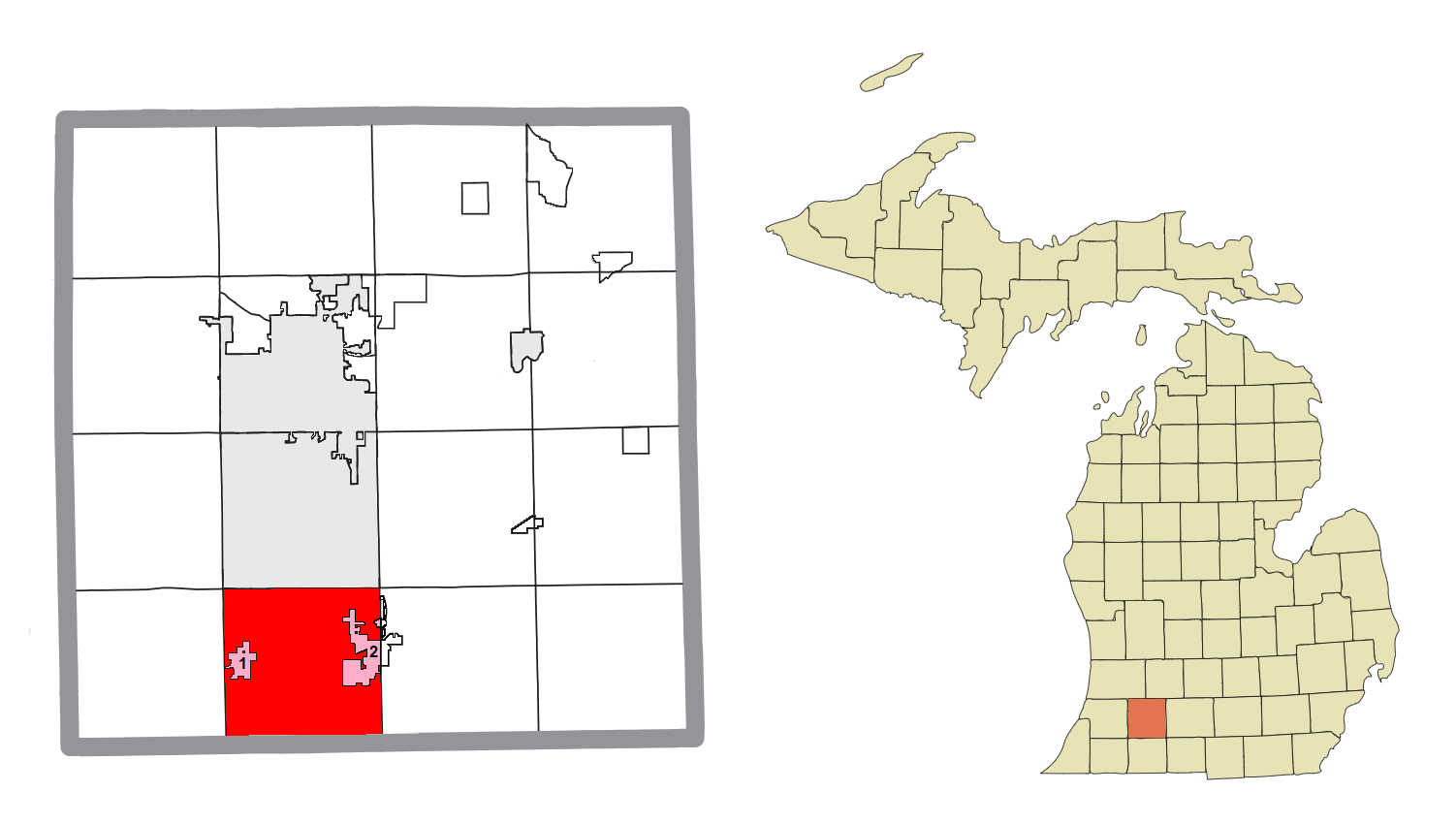
- Location within Kalamazoo County and the administered villages of Schoolcraft (1) and portion of Vicksburg (2)

- Location within the state of Michigan Location within the United States
- Coordinates: 42°7′4″N 85°35′10″W
- Country: United States
- State: Michigan
- County: Kalamazoo

Area
  - Total: 36.1 sq mi (93.4 km^{2})
  - Land: 34.3 sq mi (88.8 km^{2})
  - Water: 1.8 sq mi (4.7 km^{2})
- Elevation: 860 ft (262 m)

Population (2020)
  - Total: 9,183
  - Density: 268/sq mi (103/km^{2})
- Time zone: UTC-5 (Eastern (EST))
  - Summer (DST): UTC-4 (EDT)
- ZIP code: 49087
- Area code: 269
- FIPS code: 26-71880
- GNIS feature ID: 1627049
- Website: schoolcrafttownshipmi.gov

Schoolcraft Township is a civil township of Kalamazoo County in the U.S. state of Michigan. The population was 9,183 at the 2020 census, up from 8,214 at the 2010 census. The township is named for Henry Schoolcraft, noted for conducting many early land surveys throughout Michigan.

== Communities ==
- The village of Schoolcraft is located on the western side of the township on U.S. Highway 131.
- The village of Vicksburg is partially within the township on the east side.

== Geography ==
According to the United States Census Bureau, the township has a total area of 36.1 square miles (93.4 km^{2}), of which 34.3 square miles (88.8 km^{2}) are land and 1.8 square miles (4.7 km^{2}), or 4.99%, are water.

== Demographics ==
As of the census of 2000, there were 7,260 people, 2,781 households, and 2,027 families residing in the township. The population density was 211.3 inhabitants per square mile (81.6/km^{2}). There were 2,916 housing units at an average density of 84.9 per square mile (32.8/km^{2}). The racial makeup of the township was 96.96% White, 0.51% African American, 0.30% Native American, 0.66% Asian, 0.23% from other races, and 1.34% from two or more races. Hispanic or Latino of any race were 1.16% of the population.

There were 2,781 households, out of which 36.7% had children under the age of 18 living with them, 59.7% were married couples living together, 9.5% had a female householder with no husband present, and 27.1% were non-families. 22.1% of all households were made up of individuals, and 8.6% had someone living alone who was 65 years of age or older. The average household size was 2.60 and the average family size was 3.06.

In the township the population was spread out, with 27.4% under the age of 18, 7.5% from 18 to 24, 28.4% from 25 to 44, 25.4% from 45 to 64, and 11.3% who were 65 years of age or older. The median age was 38 years. For every 100 females, there were 96.5 males. For every 100 females age 18 and over, there were 94.0 males.

The median income for a household in the township was $48,737, and the median income for a family was $58,086. Males had a median income of $41,406 versus $30,437 for females. The per capita income for the township was $21,512. About 3.3% of families and 5.3% of the population were below the poverty line, including 4.9% of those under age 18 and 5.2% of those age 65 or over.
