= Texas Charter Township, Michigan =

Texas Township, Michigan
- Charter township
- Charter Township of Texas
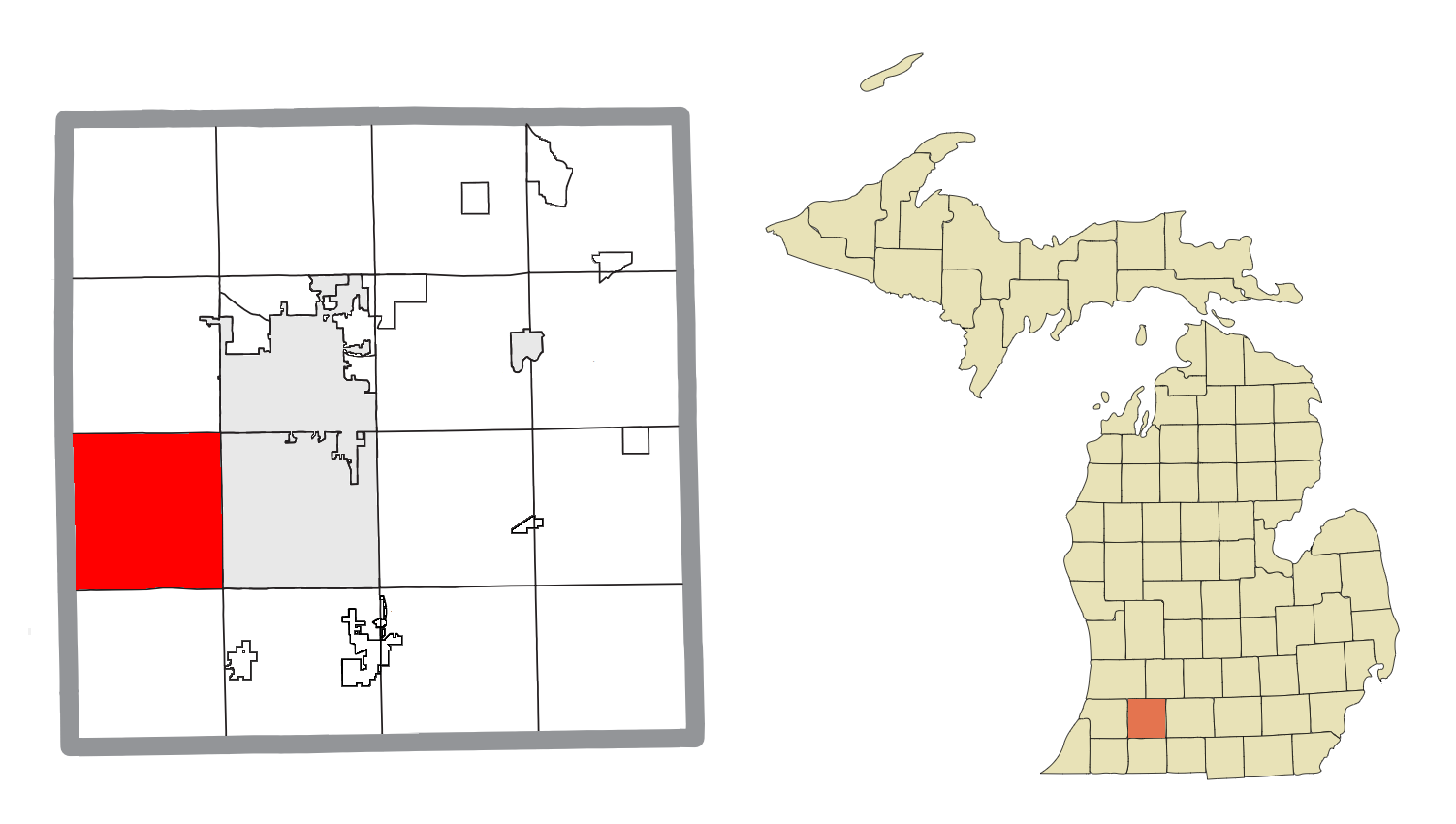
- Location within Kalamazoo County

- Location within the state of Michigan Location within the United States
- Coordinates: 42°12′44″N 85°41′47″W
- Country: United States
- State: Michigan
- County: Kalamazoo

Area
  - Total: 36.30 sq mi (94.01 km^{2})
  - Land: 34.38 sq mi (89.05 km^{2})
  - Water: 1.92 sq mi (4.96 km^{2})
- Elevation: 909 ft (277 m)

Population (2020)
  - Total: 17,691
  - Density: 514.5/sq mi (198.7/km^{2})
- Time zone: UTC-5 (Eastern (EST))
  - Summer (DST): UTC-4 (EDT)
- Postal codes: 49009 (Kalamazoo)
- Area code: 269
- FIPS code: 26-077-79300
- GNIS feature ID: 1627158
- Website: www.texastownship.org

Texas Charter Township is a charter township in Kalamazoo County in the U.S. state of Michigan. As of the 2020 census, the township population was 17,691, up from 14,697 at the 2010 census. It encompasses the entire portion of the survey township T3S R12W.

The Texas Township Campus of Kalamazoo Valley Community College is located on the southern side of West O Avenue, just east of 8th Street South.

== Geography ==
The township is in western Kalamazoo County, bordered to the east by the city of Portage and to the west by the village of Mattawan in Van Buren County. According to the United States Census Bureau, the township has a total area of 36.3 square miles (94.0 km^{2}), of which 34.4 square miles (89.1 km^{2}) are land and 1.9 square miles (5.0 km^{2}), or 5.28%, are water.

Interstate 94 crosses the northern part of the township, leading east to Kalamazoo and west to Benton Harbor. US 131 is a north–south highway that runs just east of the township boundary in the city of Portage. Texas Township wholly contains the Al Sabo Preserve, which straddles Portage Creek through southwestern Kalamazoo County.

== Demographics ==
As of the census of 2010, there were 14,697 people, 5,231 households, and 4,214 families residing in the township. The population density was 404.9 inhabitants per square mile (156.3/km^{2}). The racial makeup of the township was 90.6% White, 2.5% African American, 0.03% Native American, 4.1% Asian, 0.0003% Pacific Islander, 0.5% from other races, and 2% from two or more races. Hispanic or Latino of any race were 2.1% of the population.

There were 5,231 households, out of which 39.5% had children under the age of 18 living with them, 80.6% were married couples living together, 6.7% had a female householder with no husband present, and 19.4% were non-families. 15% of all households were made up of individuals, and 5.2% had someone living alone who was 65 years of age or older. The average household size was 2.81 and the average family size was 3.14.

In the township, the population was spread out, with 28.8% under the age of 18, 3.6% from 18 to 24, 23.9% from 25 to 44, 30.8% from 45 to 64, and 10.5% who were 65 years of age or older. The median age was 39.5 years. Males account for 49.8% of the total population, with females representing 50.2%.

The median income for a household in the township was $88,250, and the median income for a family was $95,196. The median income for males was $77,386, while the median income for females was $51,673. The per capita income for the township was $32,151.
