= List of Michigan State Historic Sites in Van Buren County =

Location of Van Buren County in Michigan

The following is a list of Michigan State Historic Sites in Van Buren County, Michigan. Sites marked with a dagger (†) are also listed on the National Register of Historic Places in Van Buren County, Michigan.

== Current listings ==
Name	Image	Location	City	Listing date
Liberty Hyde Bailey Birthplace†		903 Bailey Avenue	South Haven	January 18, 1963
Barnum-Harrison House (Aaron Harrison House)	Barnum-Harrison House (Aaron Harrison House)	38442 West Red Arrow Highway	Paw Paw vicinity	September 17, 1981
County Poor House	County Poor House	58471 Red Arrow Highway, West of County Road 681	Hartford vicinity	November 21, 1975
Covert Library (also called Packard Hall; now used as the Covert Historical Museum)	Packard Hall	33805 M-140	Covert	August 15, 1975
Decatur Township Hall	Decator Town Hall	103 East Delaware, east of Main Street	Decatur	August 3, 1979
First Congregational Church	First Congregational Church-Lawrence	119 Exchange	Lawrence	August 3, 1979
First Congregational Church	First Congregational Church of Covert	73893 34th Avenue	Covert	August 3, 1979
Lyman A Fitch House		9997 Red Arrow Highway	Mattawan vicinity	May 13, 1981
Morgan L. Fitch Warehouse		265 Front Street	Mattawan	July 17, 1981
Hamilton Grange Hall	Hamilton Grange Hall	84040 County Rd. 215	Decatur	September 13, 2002
Hartman School	Hartman School	355 Hubbard Street	South Haven	June 23, 1983
Haven Peaches Informational Designation		802 St Joseph Street	South Haven	May 4, 1966
Houppert Winery Complex†		646 Nursery	Lawton	April 17, 1997
Indiana School	Indiana School	615 Indiana Avenue	South Haven	June 15, 1984
Kalamazoo and South Haven Railroad Bloomingdale Depot	Kalamazoo & South Haven Depot	102 N. Van Buren St.	Bloomingdale	June 20, 1985
Lawrence and Arlington District No. 6 Schoolhouse		5400 48th Ave.	Lawrence Township	June 18, 1982
Lawrence Town Hall	Lawrence Town Hall	126 St Joseph Street	Lawrence	November 14, 1974
Marshall's Store†		102 St Joseph Street	Lawrence	September 10, 1979
Marsland-Kenilworth Resort	Marsland-Kenilworth Resort	56 North Shore Drive	South Haven	December 20, 1989
Olds House (burned and demolished in 2004)		202 West Main	Hartford	August 3, 1979
Olds/Merriman House (now used as the Hartford Public Library)	Olds-Merriman House	15 South Franklin Street	Hartford	July 29, 1980
Paw Paw City Hall†		111 East Michigan Avenue	Paw Paw	December 19, 1971
Paw Paw Public Library	Paw Paw Public Library	129 Kalamazoo Street	Paw Paw	June 6, 2002
Paw Paw Water Works Pumping Station	Paw Paw Water Works Pumping Station	706 South Kalamazoo Street	Paw Paw	July 17, 1981
Rush Lake Indian Cemetery	Rush Lake Indian Cemetery-Burial Place of Simon Pokagon. Chief of the Potawatomi Indians	50033 Rush Lake Road	Hartford vicinity	April 20, 1989
St. Mark's Church / The Reverend Darius Barker		609 East Michigan Avenue	Paw Paw	January 22, 1987
Scott Club	Scott Club	652 Phoenix Street	South Haven	April 21, 1980
Territorial Road Informational Designation	Territorial Road	Old US-12, west of the State Police post	Paw Paw	September 17, 1957
Van Buren County Courthouse Complex†		111 East Michigan Avenue	Paw Paw	November 7, 1977
Issac Watts Willard Informational Designation	Issac Watts Willard	429 S. Kalamazoo St.	Paw Paw	August 18, 2014
West Michigan Summer Resorts / Jewish Resorts Informational Designation	West Michigan Resorts	265 North Shore Drive	South Haven	April 19, 2009

== See also ==
- National Register of Historic Places listings in Van Buren County, Michigan

== Sources ==
- Historic Sites Online – Van Buren County. Michigan State Housing Developmental Authority. Accessed June 4, 2011.
