= Paw Paw High School (Michigan) =

Location
- Paw Paw, Michigan 49079; United States
- Coordinates: 42°13′16″N 85°51′00″W

Information
- School district: Paw Paw Public Schools
- Superintendent: Rick Reo
- Principal: Tammy Southworth
- Teaching staff: 36.60 (on an FTE basis)
- Grades: 9-12
- Enrollment: 665 (2023-2024)
- Student to teacher ratio: 18.17
- Colors: Red and white
- Athletics conference: Wolverine Conference
- Nickname: Red Wolves
- Website: www.ppps.org/o/high-school

Paw Paw High School is a public secondary school in Antwerp Township, Michigan, United States. It serves grades 9-12 for Paw Paw Public Schools.

== Academics ==
Paw Paw ranked 133rd in Michigan and 3,781st nationally in the 2020 U.S. News & World Report annual survey of public high schools. Vocational education classes are available through the Van Buren Technology Center. Students can pursue dual enrollment at either Western Michigan University or Kalamazoo Valley Community College.

== Demographics ==
The demographic breakdown of the 860 students enrolled for the 2022-23 school year was:

- Male - 50.0%
- Female - 50.0%
- Asian - 1.0%
- Black - 1.0%
- Hispanic - 7.0%
- Native Hawaiian/Pacific islanders - N/A
- White - 88.0%
- Multiracial - 3.0%

31.0% of the students were eligible for free and 3.0% were eligible reduced-cost lunch.

== Mascot controversy ==
The mascot used to be the Redskins. The mascot brought much controversy and was heavily criticized by many outside the community. Having voted to retain the mascot in 2017, the school board decided to end the continuing controversy in March 2020 and retire the name at the end of the school year. On July 13, 2020, the school changed its mascot to the "Red Wolves".

== Athletics ==
The Paw Paw Red Wolves compete in the Wolverine Conference. School colors are red and white. The following Michigan High School Athletic Association (MHSAA) sanctioned sports are offered:

- Baseball (boys)
- Basketball (girls and boys)
- Bowling (girls and boys)
- Competitive cheerleading (girls)
- Cross country (girls and boys)
- Football (boys)
- Golf (girls and boys)
- Ice hockey (boys)
- Soccer (girls and boys)
  - Boys state champion - 1998
- Softball (girls)
- Tennis (girls and boys)
- Track and field (girls and boys)
  - Boys state champion - 1934, 1935, 1936, 1947
- Volleyball (girls)
- Wrestling (boys)

== Notable alumni ==
- Susan Kaiser Greenland (1974), author and teacher of mindfulness and meditation
- John Bonamego (1983), football coach for the Iowa State Cyclones
- Jason Babin (2000), former Pro Bowl linebacker and defensive end who played for nine NFL teams
- Karsen Barnhart (2019), offensive tackle for the Michigan Wolverines
