= Paw Paw Public Schools =

School district in Michigan

Address
- 119 Johnson Road Paw Paw, Van Buren, Michigan, 49079; United States

District information
- Grades: Pre-Kindergarten-12
- Superintendent: Jeremy Davison
- Schools: 5
- Budget: $35,792,000 2022-2023 expenditures
- NCES District ID: 2627660

Students and staff
- Students: 2,146 (2024-2025)
- Teachers: 129.57 (on an FTE basis) (2024-2025)
- Staff: 280.58 FTE (2024-2025)
- Student–teacher ratio: 16.56 (2024-2025)

Other information
- Website: www.ppps.org

Paw Paw Public Schools is a public school district in Van Buren County, Michigan. It serves Paw Paw and parts of the townships of Almena, Antwerp, Lawrence, Paw Paw, and Waverly.

== History ==
The first school in Paw Paw was established in 1835. A union school district was established later in the 19th Century, and the Union School was overcrowded by 1868. In fall 1870, a new school, which came to be known as Old Red Brick, opened. The opening of Old Red Brick marks the official founding of the school district, according to its website.

A new high school opened in 1924 at 600 East Michigan Avenue. Old Red Brick was demolished around that time, and its bell stored in an attic.

Cedar Street Elementary was built in 1954. As neighboring rural districts consolidated with Paw Paw's district in 1958, more schools opened: Black River Elementary in 1960, and a new high school in fall 1961.

A few years prior to the opening of the 1961 high school, its alumni association placed the bell from Old Red Brick atop the 1924 high school, but, according to a local newspaper article, "it seldom rang." To celebrate the opening of the new high school, five seniors used donated materials to put the bell in a brick frame on the school's front lawn. The Victory Bell was to "ring out special events and especially all victories" scored by the football team. The article continued, "Students were hopeful they might get the first opportunity to hear its ding-dong last night during homecoming. But alas, South Haven's Rams whipped the Paw Paw Redskins 45-0."

The current high school opened in March 1998. Construction faced a setback when the steel frame of the gym roof collapsed in a high wind on April 6, 1997. The football and athletic fields remained at the former high school site, which became the district's middle school. The Victory Bell is currently located near the entrance to the football stadium and is often mentioned in sports coverage of the school.

== Mascot ==
In 2017, the district witnessed a controversy involving the removal of "Redskins" as the school mascot name, with the school board of education voting 4–3 to keep the name.

On January 21, 2019, the American Civil Liberties Union of Michigan filed a federal discrimination complaint alleging a racially hostile environment in the Paw Paw Public Schools District. The ACLU reported that it "used the Freedom of Information Act to obtain a substantial number of school district records that betray the widespread racially toxic climate in the schools."

On March 9, 2020, Paw Paw Public Schools Board of Education trustees voted to retire the Redskin nickname at the end of 2019–20 school year. A 27-student task force worked to gather input from students, alumni, and the Paw Paw community, and after a several-month search, announced the new nickname for the school would be the Paw Paw Red Wolves at the July, 2020 meeting of the Board of Education. The school district will begins the 2020–21 school year as the Paw Paw Red Wolves, the only school with the Red Wolves nickname and logo in the State of Michigan.

== Schools ==
Schools in Paw Paw Public School District
| School | Address | Notes |
|---|---|---|
| Paw Paw High School | 30609 Red Arrow Highway, Paw Paw | Grades 9-12. Opened 1998. |
| Paw Paw Middle School | 313 West Michigan Avenue, Paw Paw | Grades 6-8. Opened 1961. |
| Paw Paw Later Elementary | 612 North Street, Paw Paw | Grades 3-5. |
| Paw Paw Early Elementary | 512 North Street, Paw Paw | Grades K-2. |
| Paw Paw Early Childhood Center | | Preschool. Opened fall 2025. |
| Cedar Street Campus | 555 Cedar Street, Paw Paw | Alternative high school. |
