= Karsen Barnhart =

American football player (born 2001)

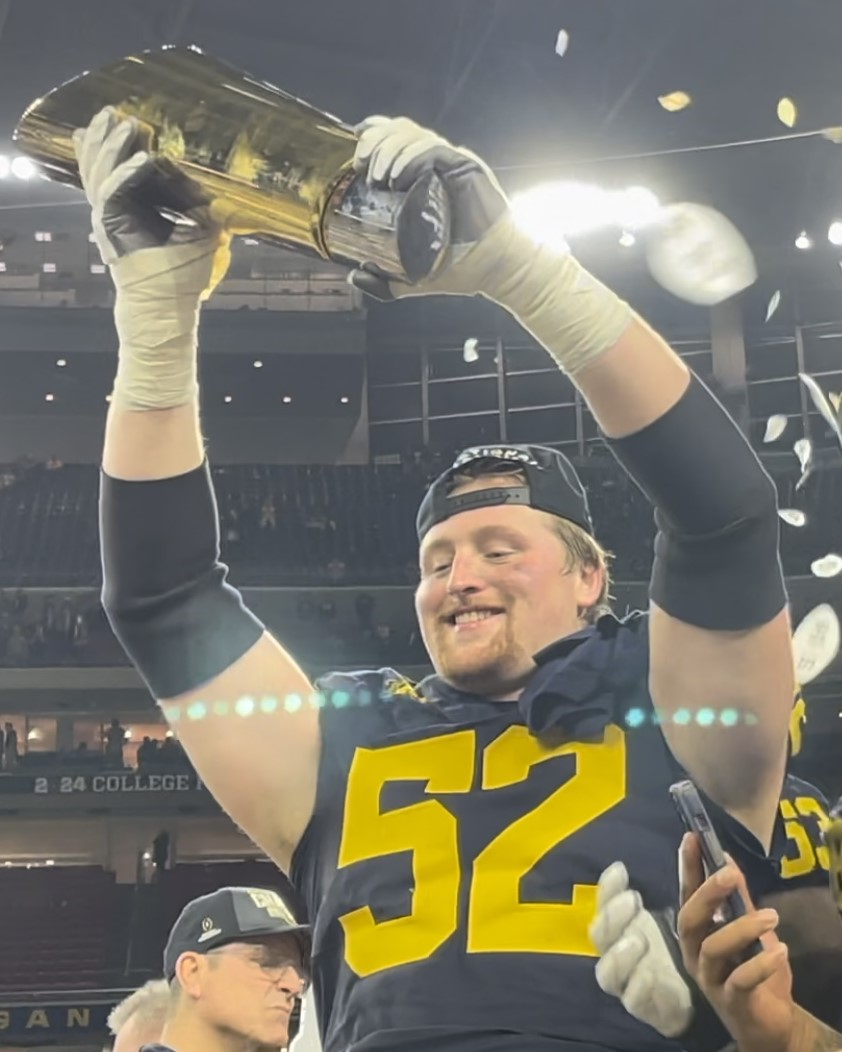
- Barnhart hoists the CFP trophy in January 2024

Profile
- Position: Guard

Personal information
- Born: March 2, 2001 (age 25); Paw Paw, Michigan, U.S.
- Listed height: 6 ft 4 in (1.93 m)
- Listed weight: 306 lb (139 kg)

Career information
- High school: Paw Paw
- College: Michigan (2019–2023)
- NFL draft: 2024: undrafted

Career history
- Los Angeles Chargers (2024–2025)*; Denver Broncos (2025)*; Tampa Bay Buccaneers (2025)*; Green Bay Packers (2025)*
- * Offseason or practice squad member only

Awards and highlights
- CFP national champion (2023); Second-team All-Big Ten (2023)
- Stats at Pro Football Reference

Karsen Alan Barnhart (born March 2, 2001) is an American professional football guard. He played college football for the Michigan Wolverines, where he was an All-Big Ten selection, winning three consecutive Big Ten Conference titles and a national championship in 2023. Barnhart was signed by the Los Angeles Chargers as an undrafted free agent in 2024.

== Early life ==
Barnhart was born in Paw Paw, Michigan, the son of Jeff and Jennifer Barnhart, where he attended Paw Paw High School, playing baseball, basketball and football. He played his junior season at Paw Paw at tight end, after spending his first two years at offensive tackle. He caught 17 passes for 209 yards and three touchdowns as junior and senior, as well as playing offensive tackle. He received All-State honors from the Michigan High School Football Coaches Association, Associated Press and The Detroit News. He was ranked a four-star recruit, and the No. 15 guard and No. 7 player in Michigan by 247Sports. He received offers from Michigan, Michigan State, Indiana, Iowa, Nebraska, Minnesota and USC.

== College career ==
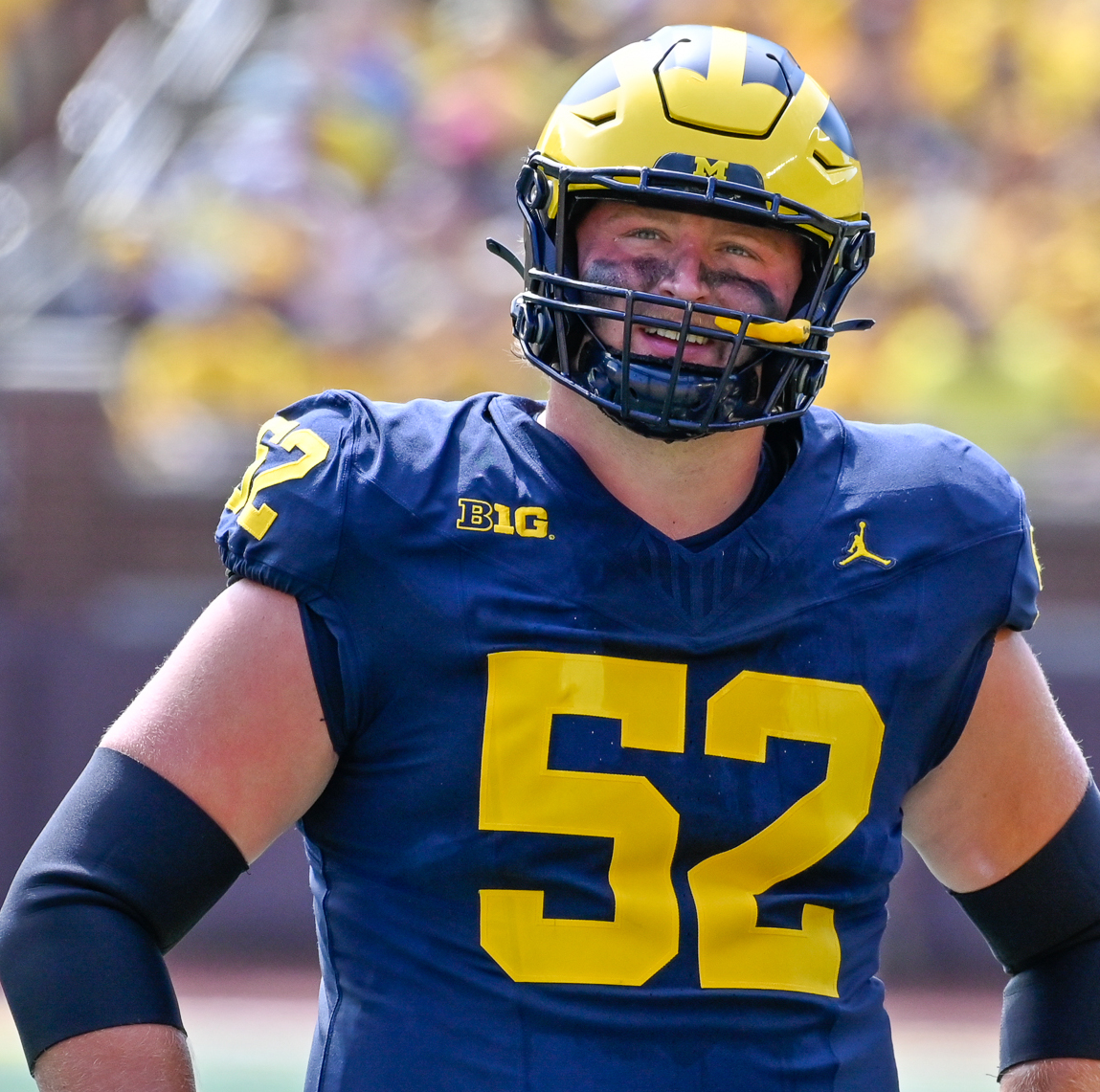
Barnhart with Michigan in 2023

Barnhart committed to the University of Michigan in April 2018. As a freshman in 2019, he appeared in two games at left tackle, and played special teams in one game. He made his collegiate debut on August 31, 2019, in a game against Middle Tennessee.

As a sophomore in 2020, he appeared in all six games, with four starts at left tackle. He started in place of the injured Ryan Hayes, in a season that was shortened due to the COVID-19 pandemic.

As a junior in 2021, he appeared in 10 games, including two starts at left guard. He was a part of the Joe Moore Award winning offensive line.

As a senior in 2022, he started appeared in ten games, with nine starts, at offensive tackle and was again part of the Joe Moore Award-winning offensive line. Following the season he was named All-Big Ten honorable mention. He was also named Michigan's most improved player on offense.

As a graduate student in 2023, he started all 15 games for Michigan’s national championship team, including starts at right tackle, right guard and left tackle. After guard Zak Zinter sustained a broken tibia and fibula in Michigan's final regular season victory against Ohio State, it was announced Barnhart would shift from right tackle to guard for the remainder to the season. Following the season he was named second-team All-Big Ten by the coaches.

On January 6, 2024, Barnhart declared for the 2024 NFL draft.

== Professional career ==
Pre-draft measurables
Height	Weight	Arm length	Hand span	Wingspan	40-yard dash	10-yard split	20-yard split	20-yard shuttle	Three-cone drill	Vertical jump	Broad jump	Bench press
6 ft 4 1/2 in (1.94 m)	306 lb (139 kg)	33 3/8 in (0.85 m)	9 7/8 in (0.25 m)	6 ft 9 1/4 in (2.06 m)	5.21 s	1.76 s	2.97 s	4.62 s	7.52 s	30.0 in (0.76 m)	9 ft 3 in (2.82 m)	22 reps
All values from NFL Combine/Pro Day

=== Los Angeles Chargers ===
On April 27, 2024, Barnhart signed with the Los Angeles Chargers as an undrafted free agent, reuniting him with former Michigan head coach Jim Harbaugh. He was waived on August 27, and re-signed to the practice squad. He signed a reserve/future contract on January 13, 2025.

On August 26, 2025, Barnhart was released by the Chargers as part of final roster cuts and re-signed to the practice squad the next day. Barnhart was waived again on August 31.

=== Denver Broncos ===
On October 14, 2025, Barnhart was signed to the Denver Broncos' practice squad. On October 21, he was waived.

=== Tampa Bay Buccaneers ===
On November 5, 2025, Barnhart signed with the Tampa Bay Buccaneers' practice squad. He was released by the Buccaneers on November 21.

=== Green Bay Packers ===
On December 31, 2025, the Green Bay Packers signed Barnhart to their practice squad. He signed a reserve/future contract with Green Bay on January 12, 2026. Barnhart was released by the Packers on August 11.
