= Lawrence Public Schools =

Lawrence Public Schools or Lawrence School District may refer to:

- Lawrence Public Schools (Massachusetts)
- Lawrence Public Schools (New York)
- Lawrence Public Schools (Michigan)

== See also ==
- Lawrence USD 497 (for Lawrence, Kansas)
- Lawrence Township Public Schools (New Jersey)
