= Jason Babin =

American football player (born 1980)

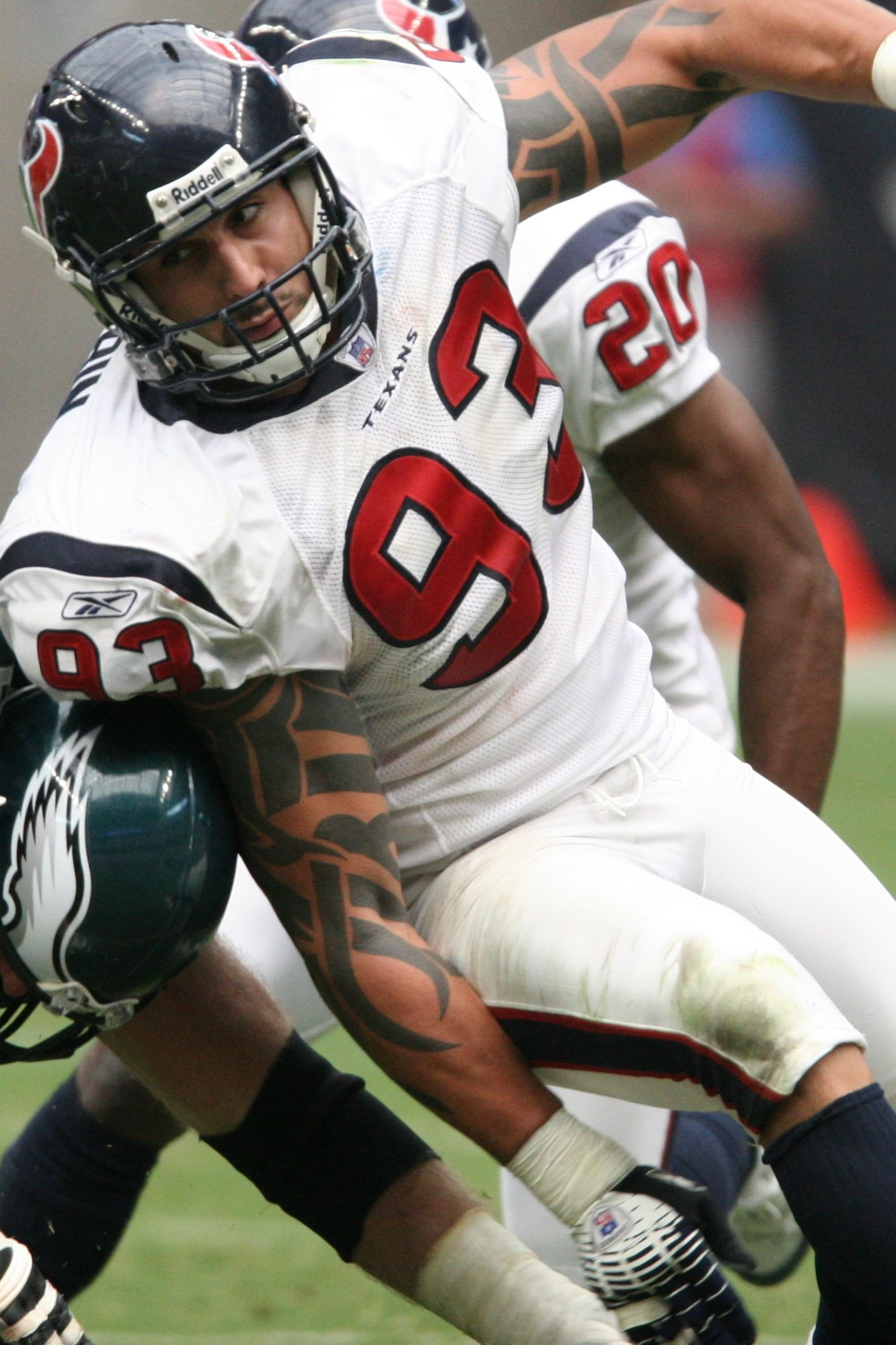
- Babin with the Houston Texans in 2006

No. 93, 52, 94, 58, 56
- Position: Defensive end

Personal information
- Born: May 24, 1980 (age 46); Kalamazoo, Michigan, U.S.
- Listed height: 6 ft 3 in (1.91 m)
- Listed weight: 267 lb (121 kg)

Career information
- High school: Paw Paw (Antwerp Township, Michigan)
- College: Western Michigan (2000–2003)
- NFL draft: 2004: 1st round, 27th overall pick

Career history
- Houston Texans (2004–2006); Seattle Seahawks (2007–2008); Kansas City Chiefs (2008); Philadelphia Eagles (2009); Tennessee Titans (2010); Philadelphia Eagles (2011–2012); Jacksonville Jaguars (2012–2013); New York Jets (2014); Baltimore Ravens (2015); Arizona Cardinals (2015)

Awards and highlights
- Second-team All-Pro (2011); 2× Pro Bowl (2010, 2011); Second-team All-American (2003); 2× MAC Defensive Player of the Year (2002, 2003); 2× First-team All-MAC (2002, 2003); Second-team All-MAC (2001)

Career NFL statistics
- Total tackles: 372
- Sacks: 64.5
- Forced fumbles: 14
- Fumble recoveries: 3
- Stats at Pro Football Reference

Jason Thomas Babin (born May 24, 1980) is an American former professional football player who was a defensive end and linebacker in the National Football League (NFL). He played college football at Western Michigan, where he was twice recognized as the conference defensive player of the year. He was selected by the Houston Texans in the first round of the 2004 NFL draft.

Babin played for nine teams during his NFL career (the most in league history for a defensive end or linebacker). In addition to the Texans, he played for the Seattle Seahawks, Kansas City Chiefs, Tennessee Titans, Philadelphia Eagles, Jacksonville Jaguars, New York Jets, Baltimore Ravens, and Arizona Cardinals.

== Early life ==
Babin attended Paw Paw High School and lettered in football, wrestling, and track. In football, he was a two-time team Defensive MVP, and was an All-Kalamazoo Valley Association first-team choice as a senior. In wrestling, he was the state champion as a senior. Babin came back from a broken leg during his senior year, playing in the last three games and earning a scholarship from Western Michigan University. In track & field, Babin was a state-qualifier in the throwing events, with top-throws of 16.15 meters (52 ft 9 in) in the shot put and 47.85 meters (156 ft 4 in) in the discus throw.

== College career ==
Babin attended Western Michigan University, where he played for the Western Michigan Broncos football team from 2000 to 2003. He finished his college football career with 38 sacks, 299 tackles, eight forced fumbles, and two fumble recoveries. Babin started 25 of 47 games at Western Michigan, setting Broncos career marks in sacks (38) and tackles for loss (75). Babin also had two passes defended, blocked three punts and had three receptions for 55 yards.

Babin started all 12 games at the left defensive end position as a senior, earning first-team All-American honors from The NFL Draft Report and College Sports Report and added second-team honors from Sports Illustrated, The Sporting News, and College Football News. He was a first-team All-Mid-American Conference selection and league's Defensive Player of the Year for the second consecutive season, in addition to being team captain and team MVP. As a senior, he made 115 tackles and matched his career-high with 15 sacks and made 33 tackles behind the line of scrimmage. As a junior, he started all 12 games and made 94 tackles (26 for loss), 15 sacks, two forced fumbles, one fumble recovery, and two passes defensed. Babin also blocked two punts and caught three passes for 35 yards. He made 56 tackles (13 for loss) as a sophomore, plus a team-leading seven sacks and two forced fumbles. As a freshman, Babin played in all 12 games, collected 34 tackles and was the only true freshman on the team to earn a letter.

== Professional career ==
Pre-draft measurables
Height	Weight	Arm length	Hand span	40-yard dash	10-yard split	20-yard split	20-yard shuttle	Three-cone drill	Vertical jump	Broad jump	Bench press
6 ft 2 5/8 in (1.90 m)	260 lb (118 kg)	33 1/8 in (0.84 m)	9 7/8 in (0.25 m)	4.64 s	1.64 s	2.73 s	4.14 s	7.03 s	34.0 in (0.86 m)	10 ft 1 in (3.07 m)	28 reps
All values from NFL Combine

=== Houston Texans ===
Babin was selected by Houston Texans in the first round (27th pick overall) of 2004 NFL draft. The Texans traded second, third, fourth, and fifth-round picks to the Tennessee Titans in exchange for a first (27th overall) and fifth-round pick. He was signed to a five-year contract worth $6 million by the Texans on June 26, 2004. He played 16 games in his rookie season for Houston, making 51 solo tackles, 12 assisted tackles, and four sacks. In 2005, he played in 12 games and made 35 tackles. He matched his 2004 sack mark with four and also forced two fumbles. In 2006, he played 15 games and recorded 26 tackles and five sacks.

=== Seattle Seahawks ===
On September 1, 2007, Babin was acquired by the Seattle Seahawks from the Houston Texans in exchange for safety Michael Boulware. He was released by the Seahawks on September 17, 2008, after the team acquired wide receiver Keary Colbert from the Denver Broncos.

=== Kansas City Chiefs ===
Babin was signed by the Kansas City Chiefs on November 12, 2008. After the 2008 season, Babin became a free agent.

=== Philadelphia Eagles (first stint) ===
Babin was signed by the Philadelphia Eagles on August 4, 2009.

=== Tennessee Titans ===
On March 19, 2010, Babin signed with the Tennessee Titans. Babin's lone season with Titans proved to be one of his best, recording 58 tackles, 12.5 sacks, and two forced fumbles, which led to him being named to the 2011 Pro Bowl, the first appearance of his career. He was ranked 85th by his fellow players on the NFL Top 100 Players of 2011.

=== Philadelphia Eagles (second stint) ===
Following his Pro Bowl season, Babin signed a five-year deal with the Eagles worth approximately $28 million. This deal included guarantees in the $5–6 million range and reunited him with former Titans defensive line coach Jim Washburn. In Week 1 of the 2011 regular season against the St. Louis Rams, Babin had two sacks, which matched his previous total during his last stint with the Eagles. He then would record eight sacks in three games, and climbed to the top of the NFL with 18 sacks with two games remaining in the season. He finished the season with 40 tackles and 18 sacks, the highest of his career. He earned another Pro Bowl nomination. He was ranked 44th by his fellow players on the NFL Top 100 Players of 2012.

On November 27, 2012, Babin was released. He had 5.5 sacks through 11 games.

=== Jacksonville Jaguars ===
On November 28, 2012, Babin was claimed off waivers by the Jacksonville Jaguars. In five games with the Jaguars, Babin made 11 tackles, 1.5 sacks, 2 forced fumbles, and 1 fumble recovery. Overall in the 2012 season, combined with both teams, Babin played 16 total games with 37 total combined tackles, 7 sacks, 1 pass defended, 4 forced fumbles, and 1 fumble recovery.

On November 17, 2013, Babin inadvertently ripped out a handful of Arizona Cardinals running back Andre Ellington's dreadlocks while defending a running play versus the Arizona Cardinals in Jacksonville. Babin finished the 2013 season with 7.5 sacks on 40 combined tackles, two passes defended, and three forced fumbles.

On March 10, 2014, Babin voided the final two years of his contract to become a free agent. Three days later, on March 13, he re-signed with the team.

Babin was released from the Jaguars on June 19, 2014.

=== New York Jets ===
Babin signed a two-year contract with the New York Jets on July 23, 2014. In the 2014 season, he appeared in all 16 games and started four. He recorded two sacks and 25 total tackles. He was released by the Jets on September 5, 2015.

=== Baltimore Ravens ===
The Baltimore Ravens signed Babin on September 15, 2015. Babin was released on October 13, 2015, after appearing in two regular season games for the Ravens.

=== Arizona Cardinals ===
On January 12, 2016, Babin signed with the Arizona Cardinals to add depth as an outside linebacker for the postseason after Alex Okafor was lost to an injury.

== NFL career statistics ==
Year	Team	GP	COMB	TOTAL	AST	SACK	FF	FR	FR YDS	INT	IR YDS	AVG IR	LNG	TD	PD
2004	HOU	16	63	51	12	4.0	0	2	0	0	0	0	0	0	4
2005	HOU	12	35	24	11	4.0	2	0	0	0	0	0	0	0	2
2006	HOU	15	26	19	7	5.0	0	0	0	0	0	0	0	1	1
2007	SEA	2	0												
2008	SEA	2	1	1	0	0.0	0	0	0	0	0	0	0	0	0
2008	KC	7	31	25	6	2.0	0	0	0	0	0	0	0	0	0
2009	PHI	12	16	11	5	2.5	0	0	0	0	0	0	0	0	0
2010	TEN	16	58	44	14	12.5	2	0	0	0	0	0	0	0	0
2011	PHI	16	40	35	5	18.0	3	0	0	0	0	0	0	0	1
2012	PHI	11	26	21	5	5.5	2	0	0	0	0	0	0	0	1
2012	JAX	5	11	7	4	1.5	2	1	0	0	0	0	0	0	0
2013	JAX	16	40	31	9	7.5	3	0	0	0	0	0	0	0	0
2014	NYJ	16	25	14	11	2.0	0	0	0	0	0	0	0	0	0
2015	BAL	2	0												
Career		148	372	283	89	64.5	14	3	0	0	0	0	0	1	9

== Personal life ==
In 2014, Babin was inducted into the Western Michigan University Athletics Hall of Fame.

Babin cofounded RedZone Realty Group with former Jacksonville Jaguars teammate, Kyle Bosworth.

Babin's son Talan Babin plays high school football at Ponte Vedra High School and is committed to play football at Old Dominion University.

== See also ==
- List of NFL players by most teams played for
