= Paw Paw City Hall =

- U.S. National Register of Historic Places
- Michigan State Historic Site
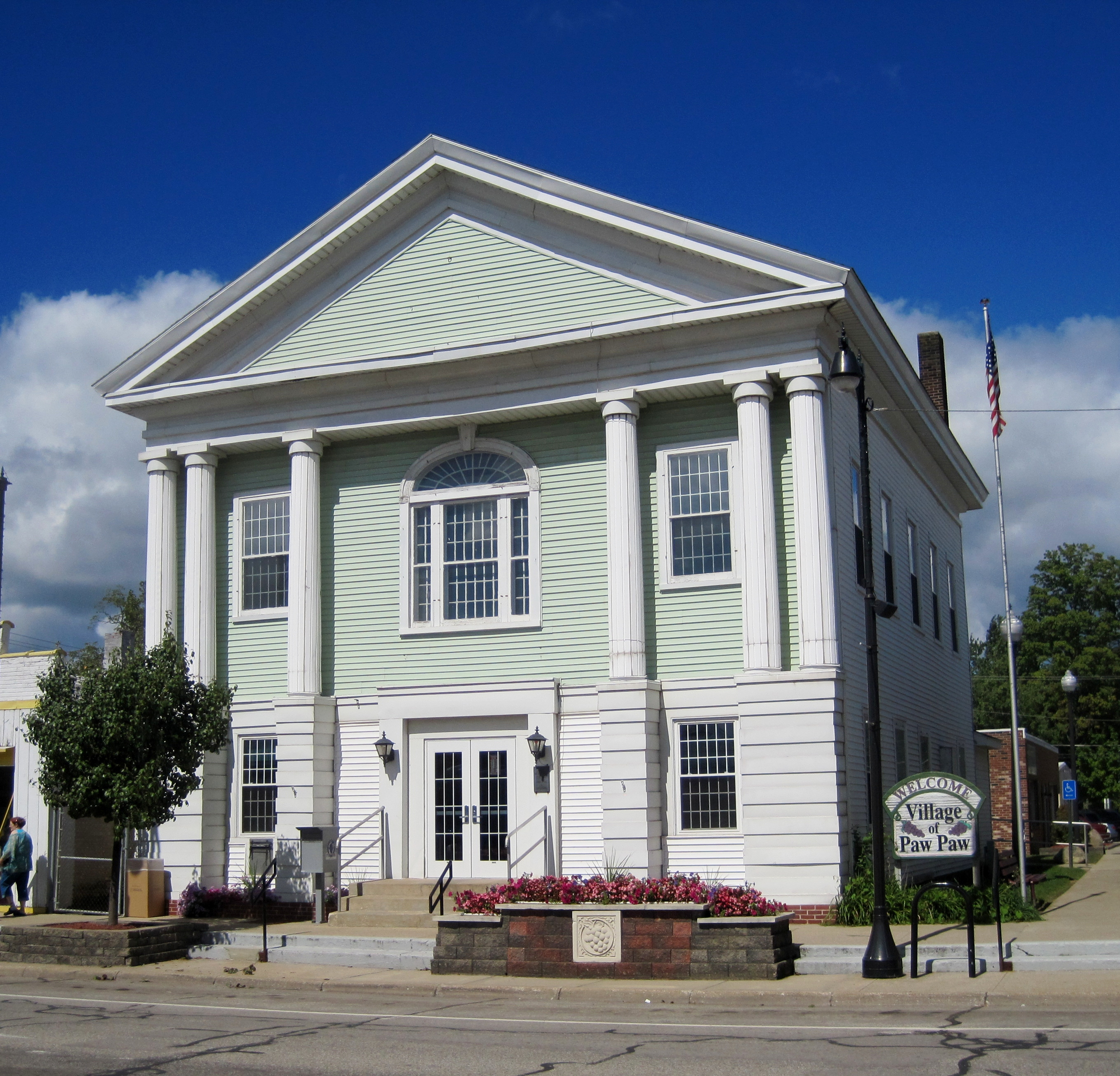

- Location within Michigan Location within the United States
- Interactive map
- Location: 111 E. Michigan Ave., Paw Paw, Michigan
- Coordinates: 42°13′5″N 85°53′29″W
- Area: 1 acre (0.40 ha)
- Built: 1842
- Built by: Reuben E. Churchill, Stafford Godfrey, & Henry W. Rhodes
- Architectural style: Greek Revival
- NRHP reference No.: 72000657

Significant dates
- Added to NRHP: August 21, 1972
- Designated MSHS: December 19, 1971

The Paw Paw City Hall is a government building located at 111 East Michigan Avenue in Paw Paw, Michigan. It was designated a Michigan State Historic Site in 1971 and listed on the National Register of Historic Places in 1972.

== History ==
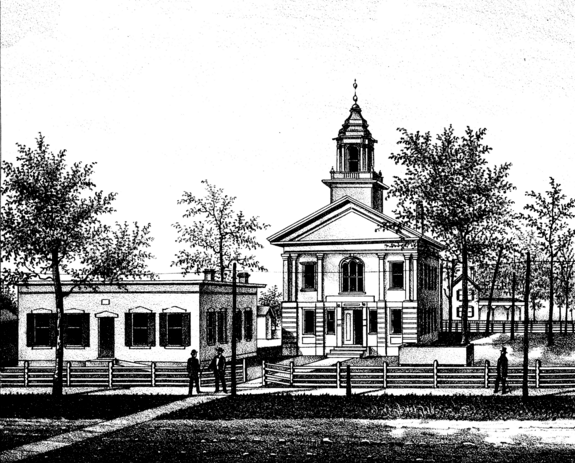
Paw Paw City Hall c. 1880

Van Buren County was originally platted in 1829, and in 1837, the Board of Supervisors chose Paw Paw as the county seat. County business was conducted in schools and private buildings for a few years, until the county decided to construct its own building. About $2900 was allocated to contractors Reuben E. Churchill, Stafford Godfrey, and Henry W. Rhodes. Construction began on this building in 1842 at the site of the current Van Buren County Courthouse, and the building was occupied in 1845.

In 1900, it was decided to construct a new courthouse for the county, and this structure was moved from its original site to the current location. It was first used as a feed store, then as a youth center during the Great Depression, and is now used as Paw Paw's city hall.

== Description ==
The Paw Paw City Hall is a two-story temple-style Greek Revival structure clad in clapboard with a gable roof. The front facade features a portico with six columns sheltering a double-door front entrance with a Palladian window above.

The building once had a classical cupola on a square base. atop the roof. The cupola was removed in stages, and is now entirely absent.
