= James Toumey =

American pioneer in forestry, botanist and educator

James William Toumey
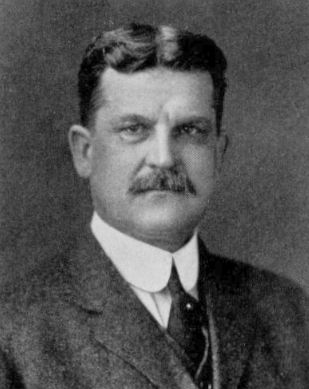
- Born: April 17, 1865; Lawrence, Michigan, United States
- Died: May 6, 1932 (aged 67); New Haven, Connecticut, United States
- Education: Michigan State University
- Known for: Forestry education
- Spouse: Nannie Trowbridge
- Awards: Fellow, Society of American Foresters
- Scientific career
- Fields: Forestry
- Workplaces: Yale University

James Toumey (1865–1932) was a pioneer in American forestry, an influential botanist, and a distinguished educator at the Yale School of Forestry (now the Yale School of the Environment).

== Early life and education ==
James William Toumey was born April 17, 1865, in Lawrence, Michigan. He earned his undergraduate degree (1889) and M.Sc. (1893) from Michigan State Agricultural College (now Michigan State University).

== Career ==
Beginning in 1899, Toumey briefly held a position with the U.S. Forest Service in charge of the cooperative work of tree planting. In 1900 Toumey was called to join the faculty of Yale's newly established school of forestry. He was promoted to professor of forestry in 1903, and was later appointed Morris K. Jessup Professor of Silviculture, which chair he held until his death. When Henry Solon Graves left Yale to become chief of the U.S. Forest Service in 1910, Toumey became Dean. From 1910 to 1922 he served as Dean of the Yale School of Forestry.

According to Graves: "[Toumey's] contribution to the development of the Yale School of Forestry cannot be over-estimated. He was a great teacher. He was a powerful factor in establishing and maintaining high standards of scholarship. By his scientific research he added to the prestige of the institution and aided in making it a center for advanced graduate study. For thirty-two years he was in continuous service of the school. Every student who attended the institution came into close association with him."

Toumey built up the holdings of the Yale Demonstration and Research Forest near Keene, New Hampshire. He also donated his personal collection of 2,500 species of American trees and shrubs to the school's forest herbarium.

Toumey held honorary degrees of Doctor of Science from Syracuse University (1920) and Doctor of Forestry from Michigan State (1927). He was a Fellow of the Society of American Foresters.

Toumey died at his home in New Haven, Connecticut, on May 6, 1932.

== Legacy ==
The Watersmeet Nursery, in Michigan's Ottawa National Forest, was renamed to honor Toumey following his death. A memorial plaque at the James W. Toumey Nursery was dedicated on July 10, 1937, to Prof. Toumey by the Yale Forestry graduates living within U.S. Forest Service Region 9.

Toumey Woods, a tract of Beech-maple forest located on the campus of Michigan State University in East Lansing, Michigan, was also named for Toumey.
