= Toumey Woods =

Natural area in the U.S. state of Michigan

- Toumey Woodlot
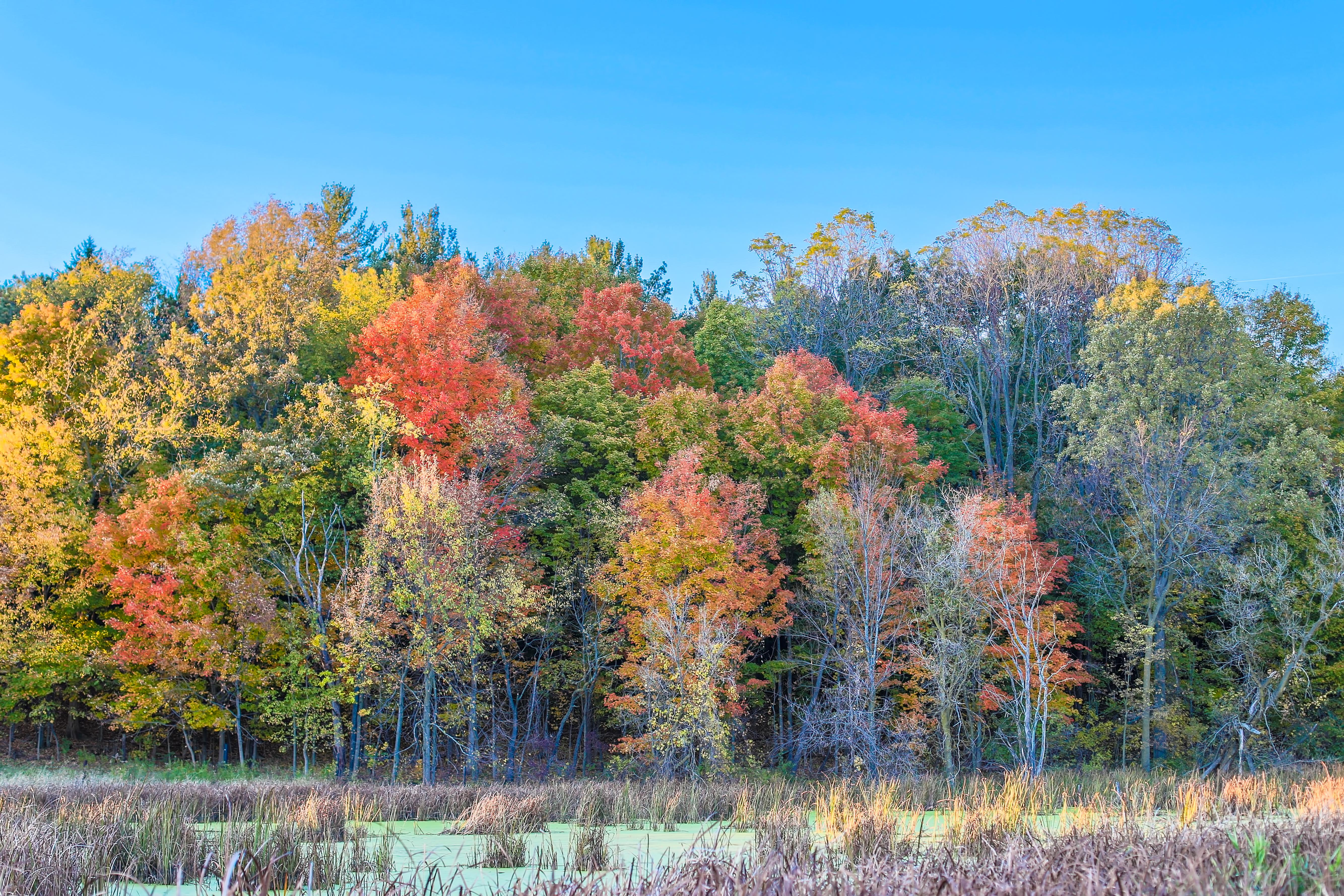
- Southeastern corner of Toumey Woods, fall 2015

- Location within Michigan
- Location: East Lansing, Michigan
- Coordinates: 42.70373°N 84.465°W
- Area: 24 acres (9.7 ha)

U.S. National Natural Landmark
- Designated: 1976

Toumey Woods, also called the Toumey Woodlot, is a 24-acre (9.7 ha) tract of beech-maple forest on the campus of Michigan State University in East Lansing, Michigan. 13.5 acres (5.5 ha) of the property are classified as old-growth woodland, and were listed as a United States National Natural Landmark in 1976.

== Ecology ==
Michigan State University (MSU), the woods' owner, reports that the primary old-growth trees are American beech and sugar maple. White ash, basswood, wild black cherry, and red oak are also present.

== History ==
Like many early Euro-American settlers of Michigan, the Bennett family set aside woodlots for personal use when they settled the tract in 1852. They maintained 13.5 acres (5.5 ha), the future Toumey Woods, in their natural condition, and sold the woodlot to MSU in 1939; thus the woodlot has had only two owners.

The woods are named after James Toumey, an MSU graduate who was later dean of the Yale School of Forestry & Environmental Studies and helped found the Ecological Society of America.
