= John Bonamego =

American football player and coach (born 1963)

Tennessee Volunteers
- Title: Special teams assistant

Personal information
- Born: August 14, 1963 (age 63); Waynesboro, Pennsylvania, U.S.

Career information
- High school: Paw Paw (MI)
- College: Central Michigan
- NFL draft: 1987: undrafted

Career history
- Mount Pleasant HS (MI) (1987) Assistant coach; Maine (1988–1991) Assistant coach; Lehigh (1992) Assistant coach; Army (1993–1998) Assistant coach; Jacksonville Jaguars (1999–2002); Assistant special teams coach (1999-2001); Special teams coordinator (2002); Green Bay Packers (2003–2005) Special teams coordinator; New Orleans Saints (2006–2007) Special teams coordinator; Miami Dolphins (2008–2010) Special teams coordinator; New Orleans Saints (2011) Assistant special teams coach; Jacksonville Jaguars (2012) Special teams coordinator; Detroit Lions (2013–2014) Special teams coordinator; Central Michigan (2015–2018) Head coach; Detroit Lions (2019) Special teams coordinator; Los Angeles Rams (2020–2021); Special teams coordinator (2020); Senior coaching assistant (2021); Iowa State (2022–2023) Senior special teams assistant; Tennessee (2025–present) Special teams assistant

Awards and highlights
- As a coach: Super Bowl champion (LVI)

John Frank Bonamego (born August 14, 1963) is an American football coach who serves as a special teams assistant for the Tennessee Volunteers. He recently served as a senior coaching assistant for the Los Angeles Rams of the National Football League (NFL). He has two decades of college and pro coaching experience. He played college football at Central Michigan and also was head coach of the team from 2015 to 2018.

Bonamego has also coached for Maine, Lehigh and Army at the college level. He has been an assistant for the Jacksonville Jaguars, Green Bay Packers and New Orleans Saints in the NFL.

On June 18, 2015, Bonamego announced that he was diagnosed with tonsil cancer, but that the cancer was caught early enough and was "very treatable'. On August 21, Bonamego announced that he had completed his radiation treatment at the University of Michigan Cancer Center in Ann Arbor.

== Early life ==
Bonamego graduated from Paw Paw High School in Paw Paw, Michigan. His father was an officer in the Army. He lived in eight zip codes –including military bases in Italy and Ethiopia– before he turned 18.

== Playing career ==
Bonamego played wide receiver and quarterback at Central Michigan University. He earned his degree in health and fitness in 1987.

== Coaching career ==
=== Beginnings ===
In 1987, Bonamego coached at Mount Pleasant High School in Michigan and was a player-coach in Europe with the Verona Redskins.

=== College ===
Bonamego served as a college assistant for 11 years, coaching for Maine from 1988 to 1991, Lehigh in 1992 and Army from 1993 to 1998.

=== Jacksonville Jaguars ===
Bonamego first joined the NFL in 1999 as an assistant special teams coach for the Jacksonville Jaguars. He held the position for three seasons before serving his final year with the team as special teams coordinator in 2002. That season, the Jaguars blocked four kicks and were second in the league in kickoff coverage. Punter Chris Hanson was also selected to Pro Bowl.

On January 20, 2012, Bonamego was hired as special teams coordinator of the Jacksonville Jaguars.

=== Green Bay Packers ===
In 2003, Bonamego joined the Green Bay Packers as the special teams coordinator and served in that capacity for three seasons under Mike Sherman. The club had four game-winning field goals in 2004, the most by the team since the 1970 merger. In 2005, the Packers had the NFL's longest punt return for a touchdown (85 yards vs. Chicago), didn't allow a return touchdown, blocked two PATs and a field goal attempt and ranked fifth in the NFC in punt return average.

=== New Orleans Saints ===
In 2006, Bonamego was hired by Sean Payton as special teams coordinator for the New Orleans Saints and held the job for two seasons. Bonamego is remembered for calling for what turned out to be a successful blocked punt by Steve Gleason in the first game at the Superdome after Hurricane Katrina. New Orleans finished 2006 tied for 10th in the NFL in the annual special teams rankings formulated by The Dallas Morning News. The Saints ranked sixth in the NFL in opponent punt return average (7.0) and fourth in the NFC in kickoff return average (23.0). New Orleans did not allow a kickoff return of more than 40 yards and the longest punt return the special teams surrendered was 31 yards. Bonamego returned to the Saints for the 2011 season as the assistant special teams coordinator.

=== Miami Dolphins ===
After two seasons in New Orleans, replaced special teams coordinator Keith Armstrong for the Miami Dolphins and first-year head coach Tony Sparano. Bonamego and Sparano had previously coached together with the Jaguars from in 2002 when Sparano was tight ends coach. Bonamego held the job for two plus seasons.

=== Central Michigan Chippewas ===
On February 9, 2015, Bonamego was introduced as the 28th football head coach in the history of Central Michigan University. Bonamego is the first alum to serve as Central Michigan's head coach since Bill Kelly from 1951 to 1966. This was Bonamego's first head coaching position and his first college coaching position since he served as an assistant for Army from 1993 to 1998. Bonamego signed a five-year contract worth $350,000 annually with an additional $125,000 for radio and television appearances.

On November 23, 2018, Bonamego was fired by Central Michigan after the team suffered the worst season in team history.

=== Detroit Lions ===
Bonamego spent two seasons – 2013 and 2014 with the Detroit Lions as the special teams coordinator. He awarded "Bono Gear" to players who stood out on special teams. He also handed out traveling trophies after every Lions victory to the special-teams player who led in categories like blocks, tackles or being the first player down to cover kickoffs.

Following his departure after the 2014 season, the Detroit Lions announced on January 22, 2019, that they had re-hired Bonamego as their special teams coordinator.

=== Los Angeles Rams ===
After his release after one season with the Detroit Lions on December 31, 2019, the Los Angeles Rams announced on February 10, 2020, that they have hired Bonamego as their special teams coach. He was shifted to senior coaching assistant on February 23, 2021. Bonamego won his first Super Bowl when the Rams defeated the Cincinnati Bengals in Super Bowl LVI.

After coaching 19 years in the NFL and 19 years at college programs, Bonamego announced his retirement on February 17, 2023.

== Head coaching record ==
Year	Team	Overall	Conference	Standing	Bowl/playoffs
Central Michigan Chippewas (Mid-American Conference) (2015–2018)
2015	Central Michigan	7–6	6–2	T–1st (West)	L Quick Lane
2016	Central Michigan	6–7	3–5	5th (West)	L Miami Beach
2017	Central Michigan	8–5	6–2	T–2nd (West)	L Famous Idaho Potato
2018	Central Michigan	1–11	0–8	6th (West)	
Central Michigan:		22–29	15–17		
Total:		22–29			
National championship Conference title Conference division title or championship game berth
