= Van Buren County Courthouse (Michigan) =

- Van Buren County Courthouse Complex
- U.S. National Register of Historic Places
- Michigan State Historic Site
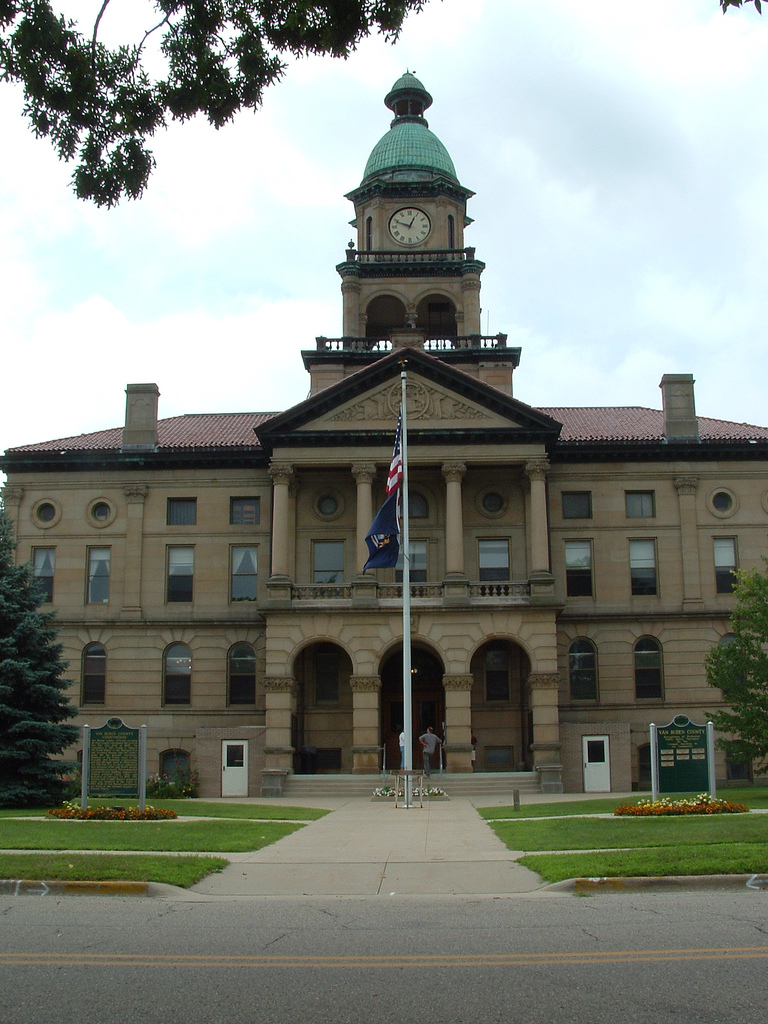

- Location within Michigan Location within the United States
- Interactive map showing the location for Van Buren County Courthouse
- Location: 212 E. Paw Paw St., Paw Paw, Michigan
- Coordinates: 42°12′58″N 85°53′27″W
- Area: 2 acres (0.81 ha)
- Built: 1901
- Built by: George Rickman & Sons
- Architect: Claire Allen
- Architectural style: Classical Revival
- NRHP reference No.: 79001169

Significant dates
- Added to NRHP: August 9, 1979
- Designated MSHS: November 7, 1977

The Van Buren County Courthouse is a government building located at 212 East Paw Paw Street in Paw Paw, Michigan. It was designated a Michigan State Historic Site in 1977 and listed on the National Register of Historic Places in 1979.

== History ==
Van Buren County was originally platted in 1829, and in 1837, the Board of Supervisors chose Paw Paw as the county seat. Construction began on this site in 1842, and the building was occupied in 1845. In 1900, it was decided to construct a new courthouse for the county, and a bond issue of $35,000 was approved by voters for the purpose. The older courthouse was moved to accommodate a new structure; the original Van Buren County Courthouse now serves as the Paw Paw City Hall.

The county hired Jackson architect Claire Allen to design the building, and contractor George Rickman & Sons to construct it. The cornerstone was laid on September 2, 1901, and the total cost, including courthouse, jail, and furnishings, was $120,000. Construction took a year and a half, and the building was dedicated on February 23, 1903.

In 1974, an annex was added to the courthouse to open up more office space. A memorial clock, designated the Sheldon and Oradell Rupert Memorial Clock, was installed in the tower in 1986.

== Description ==
The Van Buren County Courthouse is a three-story rectangular Classical Revival structure constructed of yellow sandstone with a red tile hip roof. An Italian Renaissance clock tower topped with a cupola is placed in the center of the building. The cupola and the main cornice are both constructed of copper.

The interior of the courthouse is substantially original. The courtroom has high curved ceilings and dark woodwork, as well as electric chandeliers built to look like the original gas fixtures. Four large murals are also in the courthouse.
