= Marshall's Store =

- U.S. National Register of Historic Places
- Michigan State Historic Site
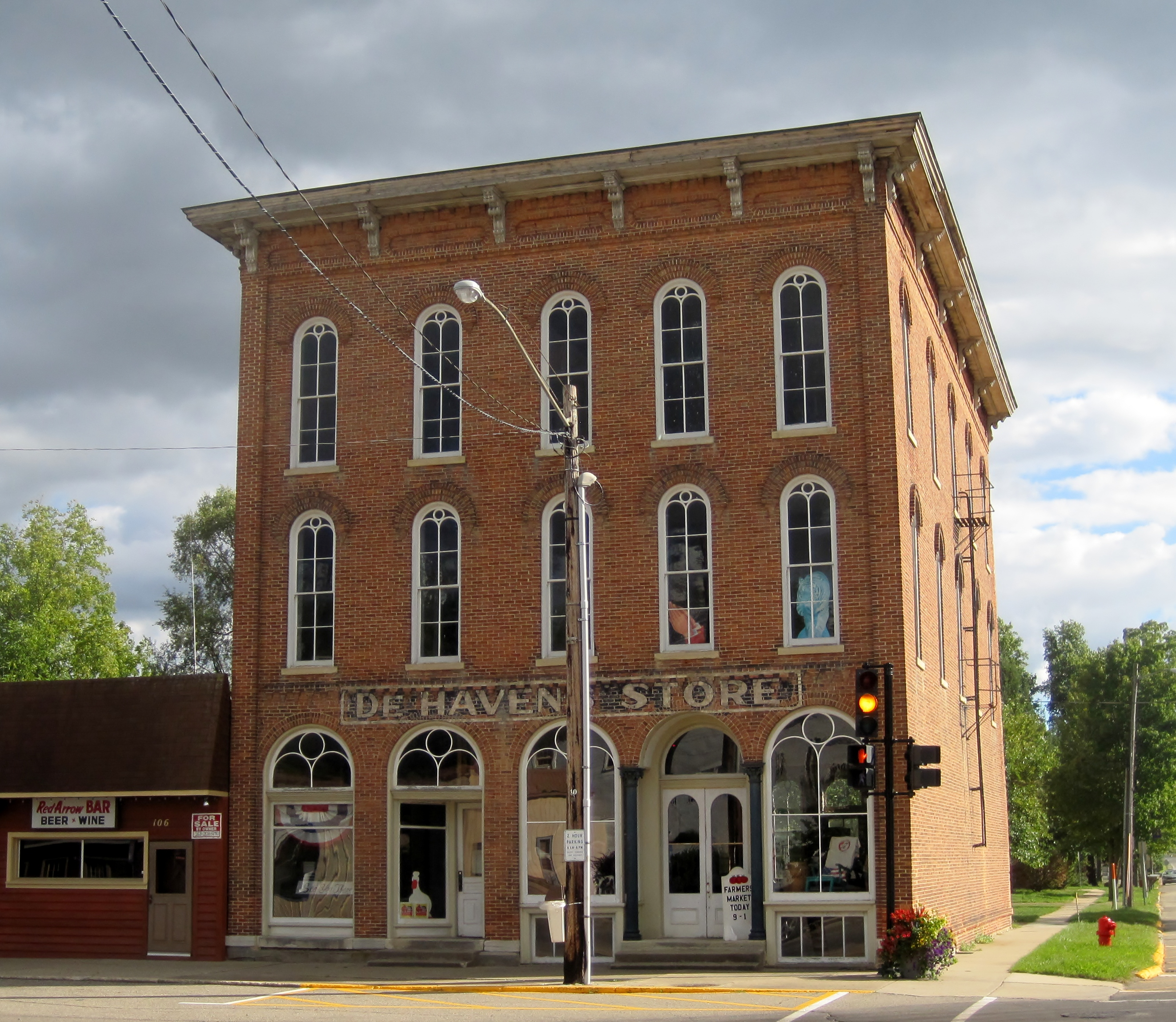
- Marshall's Store, 2012

- Location within Michigan Location within the United States
- Interactive map
- Location: 102 E. St. Joseph St., Lawrence, Michigan
- Coordinates: 42°13′8″N 86°3′4″W
- Area: less than one acre
- Built: 1874
- Architectural style: Italianate
- NRHP reference No.: 02000205

Significant dates
- Added to NRHP: March 20, 2002
- Designated MSHS: September 10, 1979

Marshall's Store, also known as DeHaven's Store, or the Marshall/DeHaven Store, is a commercial building located at 102 East St. Joseph Street in Lawrence, Michigan. It was designated a Michigan State Historic Site in 1979 and listed on the National Register of Historic Places in 2002.

== History ==
Hannibal M. Marshall (1835–1918) was born in Antwerp, New York and as a child moved with his parents and siblings to Oakland County, Michigan and then to Van Buren County, Michigan in 1838. He taught school for three years, then in 1859 began clerking in Dr. Nelson Rowe's store in Hartford, Michigan. At the end of the year, he bought out Rowe and went into business for himself. The store prospered, and by 1874 Marshall was able to construct this large building in the village of Lawrence. The store was built at least in part by a local mason named John Denton. Marshall owned the store through the end of the 19th century. Until 1902 the third floor of his building was used by Masons and other fraternal organizations as a meeting place.

In 1906, the store was sold to Levi C. DeHaven (1852–1935). DeHaven had already purchased a store in Bangor, Michigan in 1871, and had other business ventures, including later purchasing the "Big Store" in Bangor in 1900. After purchasing Marshall's store, DeHaven changed the name to "DeHaven and Sons." He operated both the Lawrence and Bangor stores until 1924, when he sold the Lawrence store to Henry R. Phillips. Phillips continued to operate the store using the name, "DeHaven's Store" until his death in 1965.

After Phillips' death, the store closed for good, having served as the main grocery and dry goods store in Lawrence from its construction through the mid-20th century.

The structure remained vacant until 1976, when Kim Traverse purchased it. From 1977 to 1983, the DeHaven Store served as the home of the Whole Art Theatre Company. It has remained one of the best preserved and most distinctive Italianate commercial buildings in the region.

== Description ==
Marshall's Store is located at the center of the village of Lawrence, and is by far the largest and most visually striking building in the commercial district. It is a three-story red brick Italianate structure stretching five bays wide. The first floor has three display windows and two doors. The name "DEHAVENS STORE" is painted directly on the bricks above the entrance.
