= Lawrence Public Schools (Michigan) =

School district in Michigan, United States

Address
- 650 West St. Joseph St. Lawrence, Van Buren County, Michigan, 49064; United States

District information
- Grades: Kindergarten–12
- Superintendent: Ryan Williamson
- Schools: 2
- Budget: $7,972,000 2022–2023 expenditures
- NCES District ID: 2621210

Students and staff
- Students: 393 (2024–2025)
- Teachers: 24.68 (on an FTE basis) (2024–2025)
- Staff: 49.85 FTE (2024–2025)
- Student–teacher ratio: 15.92 (2024–2025)
- District mascot: Tigers

Other information
- Website: www.lawrencetigers.com

Lawrence Public Schools is a public school district in Van Buren County, in West Michigan. It serves Lawrence and parts of the townships of Arlington, Lawrence, Paw Paw, and Waverly.

== History ==
Lawrence had a union school district by the late 1860s. The school was large for its time, had an advanced curriculum, and accepted students from beyond the community. The school was described in a local newspaper:

Studies of the High School are as follows: Higher Algebra, Physical Geography, Analysis, Botany, General History, Geometry, Natural Philosophy, German, French, Astronomy, Science of Government, Chemistry, Mental Philosophy, Physiology, English Literature, etc. ... The people of Lawrence who once feared that their "big school house could never be filled" need have no farther fears in that direction. ... Number of pupils enrolled during the year just closed, about 300. ... Lawrence is a very quiet little town, whose energies seem to center in the school, and being quiet and pleasant it is well adapted for the students.

The current Lawrence Junior/Senior School opened in fall 1962. Guido Binda and Associates, the building's architect, designed it as an addition to a school from 1925, which was known as the Old Building. The Old Building was torn down around 1988, and the sections built in 1962 remain.

Lawrence Elementary was built in 1955.

== Schools ==
Schools in Lawrence Public Schools district share a campus on West St. Joseph Street, west of the village of Lawrence.

Schools in Lawrence Public Schools district
School	Address	Notes
Lawrence Junior/Senior High School	650 W St. Joseph St., Lawrence	Grades 7–12
Lawrence Elementary	714 W St. Joseph St., Lawrence	Grades K-6
