= Lawrence, Michigan =

Village in Van Buren County, Michigan, USA

- Village
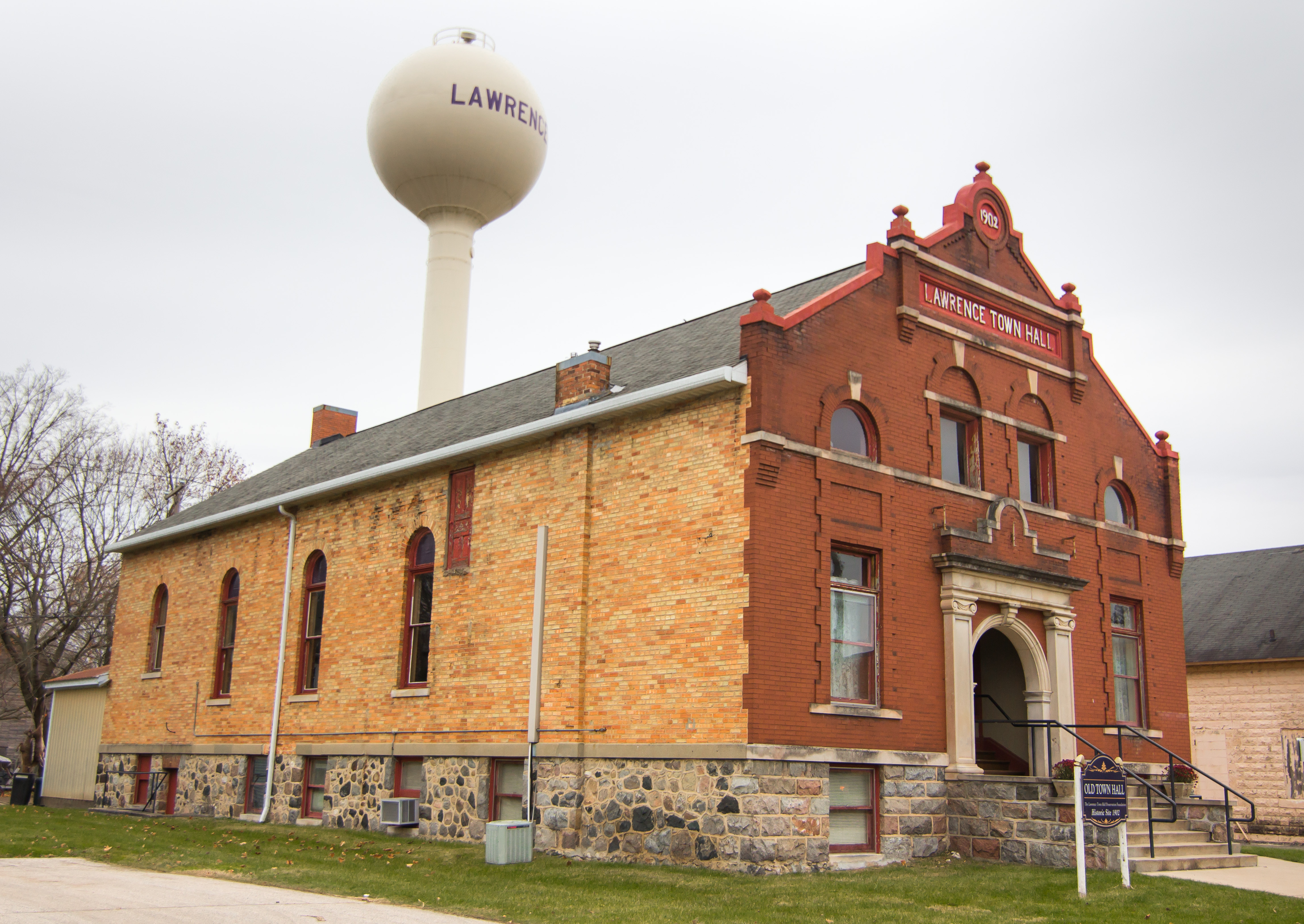
- Lawrence Town Hall

- Location of Lawrence, Michigan
- Coordinates: 42°13′4″N 86°3′2″W
- Country: United States
- State: Michigan
- County: Van Buren

Area
  - Total: 1.83 sq mi (4.74 km^{2})
  - Land: 1.78 sq mi (4.61 km^{2})
  - Water: 0.050 sq mi (0.13 km^{2})
- Elevation: 686 ft (209 m)

Population (2020)
  - Total: 964
  - Density: 541.4/sq mi (209.04/km^{2})
- Time zone: UTC-5 (Eastern (EST))
  - Summer (DST): UTC-4 (EDT)
- ZIP code: 49064
- Area code: 269
- FIPS code: 26-46440
- GNIS feature ID: 0630210
- Website: www.lawrencemi.org

The Village of Lawrence is a 2-square-mile village within Lawrence Township, in the center of Van Buren County, Michigan.

The population was 964 at the 2020 census. It hosts a Labor Day weekend "Ox Roast & Homecoming Festival" and a Farmers' Market every Saturday during the summer. Lawrence is also the hub for the Van Buren County Intermediate School District.

== History ==
Lawrence was founded in 1835 as "Mason" (in honor of then-popular first Territorial Governor Stevens T. Mason) by speculator/developer John Allen of Ann Arbor. Allen purchased 40 acres at the location of today's Brush Creek and Paw Paw River. He constructed a sawmill there in 1836, and by 1843, it was a small village of 10 homes. Each of the residents' families engaged in various trades: carpentry, farming, livestock trading, and two blacksmiths. During these first 7 years, John Allen renamed the new village "Brush Creek", then sold all his interests to Paw Paw resident John R. Baker. Allen left Michigan, taking his profits to California to try other real estate deals.

Mr Baker did not care for the new Brush Creek name, stating, "not to call my bright little village by the ugly name of Brush Creek." He rechristened it Lawrence, following the name of Lawrence Township, which had been previously established in 1835. The Lawrence Township name was derived from James Lawrence, a hero from the War of 1812.

The population increased from approximately 70 residents in 1840 to 339 in 1860, and to 555 by 1870. In March 1869, the Village of Lawrence was incorporated under an act of the Legislature, with approval by election of village officers in May 1869, at which 139 men voted.

Lakeside cottage in Lawrence, Michigan, 1930s

== Demographics ==
Historical population
Census	Pop.	Note	%±
1860	339		—
1870	555		63.7%
1880	550		−0.9%
1890	564		2.5%
1900	598		6.0%
1910	663		10.9%
1920	664		0.2%
1930	570		−14.2%
1940	679		19.1%
1950	679		0.0%
1960	773		13.8%
1970	790		2.2%
1980	903		14.3%
1990	915		1.3%
2000	1,059		15.7%
2010	996		−5.9%
2020	964		−3.2%
U.S. Decennial Census

As of the 2010 census, there were 996 people, 371 households, and 251 families living in the village. The population density was 582.5 inhabitants per square mile (224.9/km^{2}). There were 436 housing units at an average density of 255.0 per square mile (98.5/km^{2}). The racial makeup of the village was 79.4% White, 27.2% Hispanic or Latino,1.4 % African American, 0.6% Native American, 0.1% Asian, 15.6% from other races, and 2.9% from two or more races.

There were 371 households, of which 41.8% had children under the age of 18 living with them, 42.6% were married couples living together, 16.7% had a female householder with no husband present, 8.4% had a male householder with no wife present, and 32.3% were non-families. 29.1% of all households were made up of individuals, and 10.2% had someone living alone who was 65 years of age or older. The average household size was 2.65 and the average family size was 3.25.

The median age in the village was 31.7 years. 32% of residents were under the age of 18; 8.6% were between the ages of 18 and 24; 27.8% were from 25 to 44; 22.1% were from 45 to 64; and 9.1% were 65 years of age or older. The gender makeup of the village was 50.5% male and 49.5% female.

=== Architecture ===
- Marshall's Store - 102 E St Joseph St. known today as the DeHaven Store. 3 story Italianate built 1874, closed as store 1965.

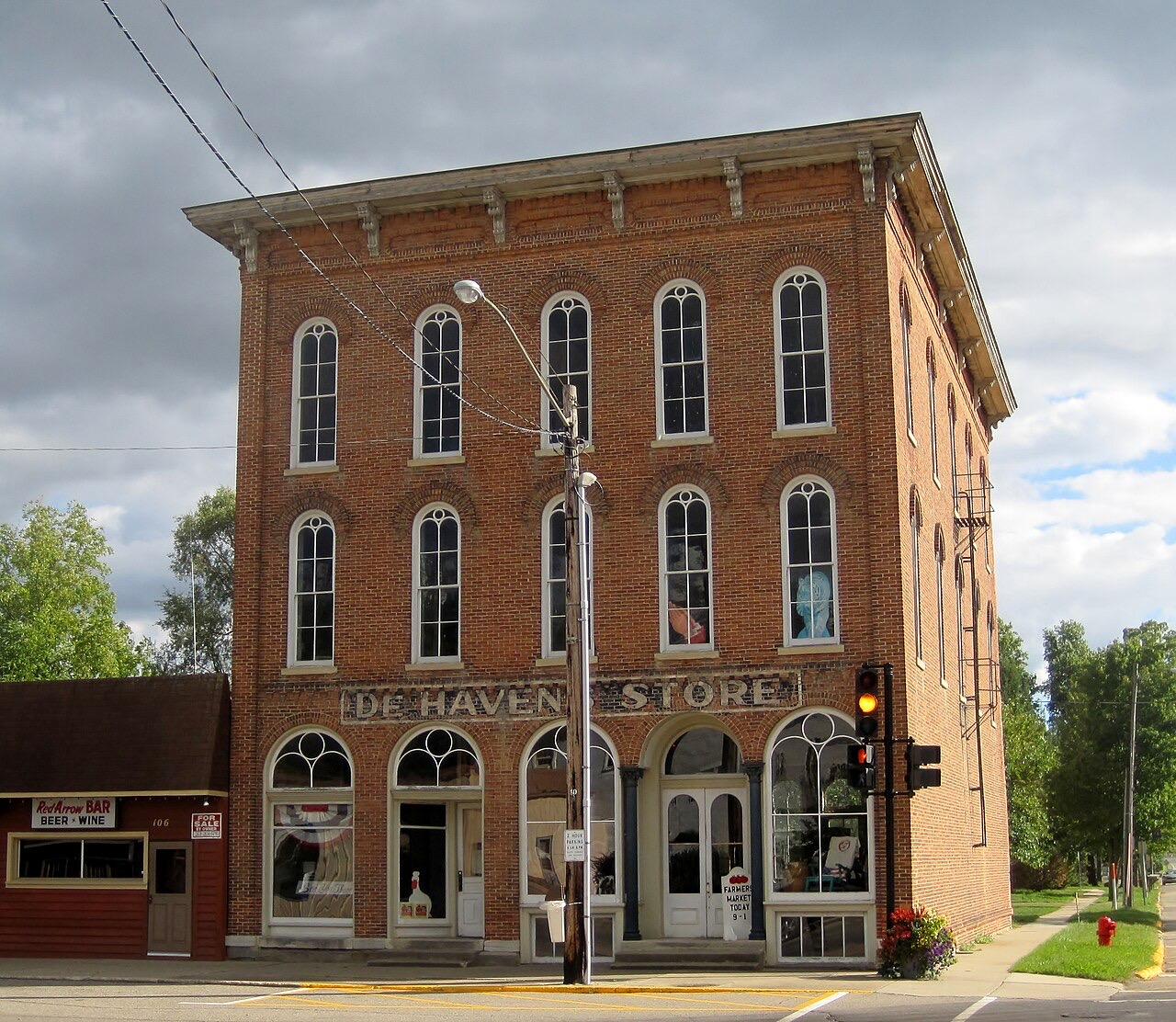
Marshall’s Store - now DeHavens

- Webster Circus House. -305 E St Joseph. Built 1850 by Ohio natives Razleman "Ralph" & Betsy Webster. In 1873 their daughter Nett and husband Burr Robbins, of the Robbins Traveling Circus, painted the signature red and yellow circus theme colors that exist today
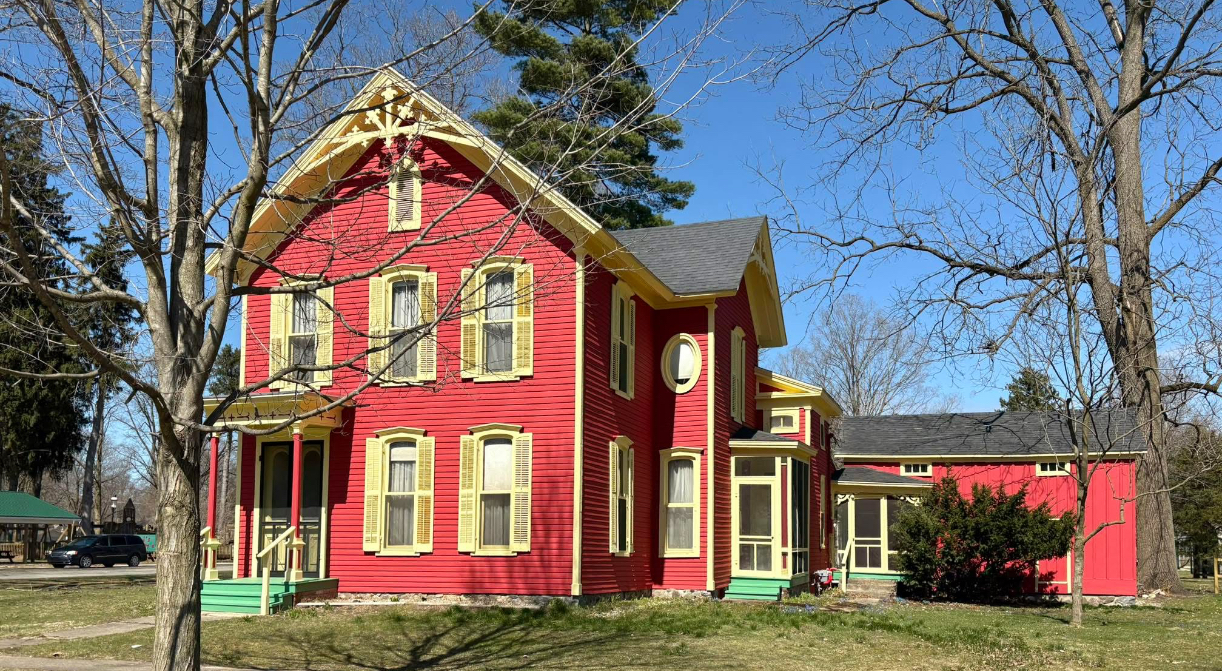
  Webster house - Lawrence Michigan
- Lawrence Old Town Hall - 126 W St Joseph St. Built 1902. Operated as a vaudeville stop, community theatre, dance hall, movie theater, library and Township meeting offices. Presently under control by The Lawrence Townhall Preservation Foundation.

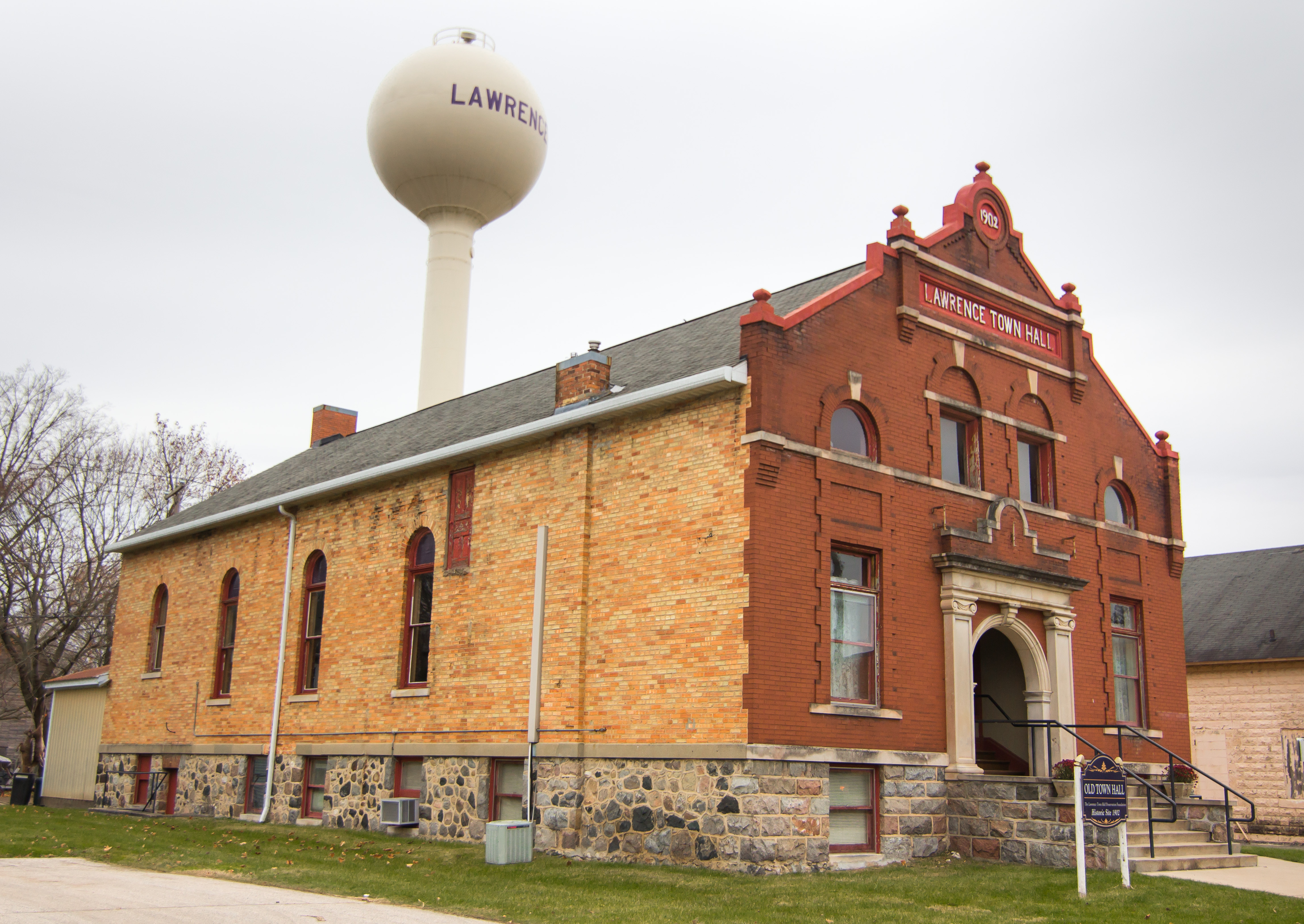
Lawrence Old Town Hall - built 1902

- American Legion Hess-Eastman Post 174 - 130 E St Joseph St

https://mylegion.org/personifyebusiness/Post-Detail?@IP_IDENTITY_MCID=00025017400L&@IP_IDENTITY_SCID=0

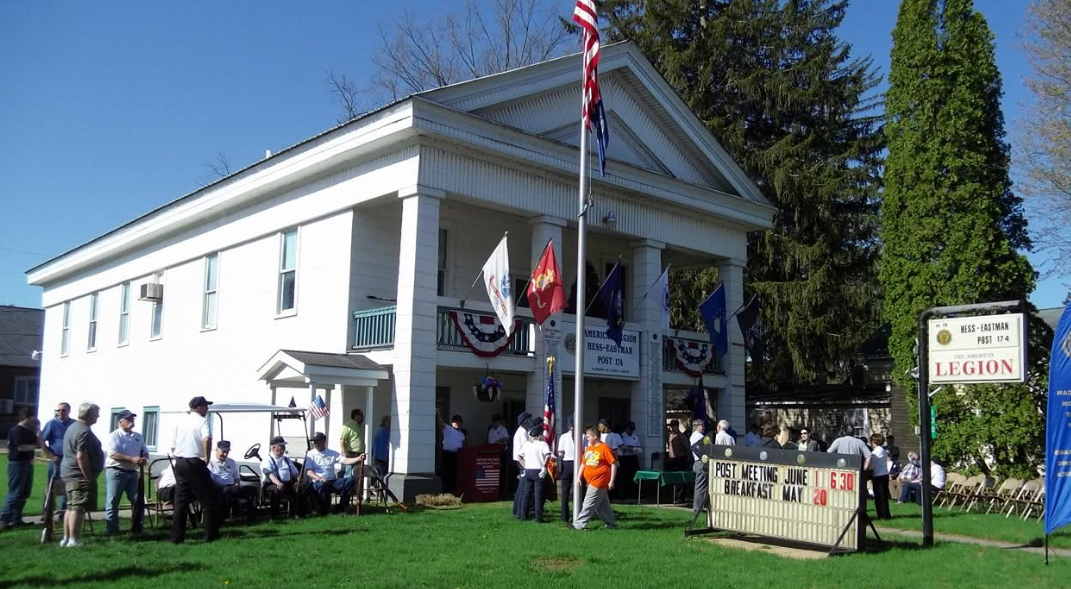
Hess-Eastman American Legion Post 174

=== Education ===
- Lawrence Public Schools www.lawrencetigers.com
- Van Buren County Intermediate School District www.vbisd.org

== Notable people ==
- Shayne Whittington, Professional basketball player born 1991. Played for Lawrence High School, Western Michigan University, Indiana Pacers, and in Spain, Russia, & Japan. His jersey #32 was retired by Lawrence in 2015.
- Barbara Jean Crandall-Daniel, Miss Michigan, 1984
- James Toumey, born in Lawrence 1865, died in New Haven, CT 1932. A pioneering educator at the Yale School of Forestry (now the Yale School of Forestry and Environmental Studies)
