= Houppert Winery Complex =

- U.S. National Register of Historic Places
- Michigan State Historic Site
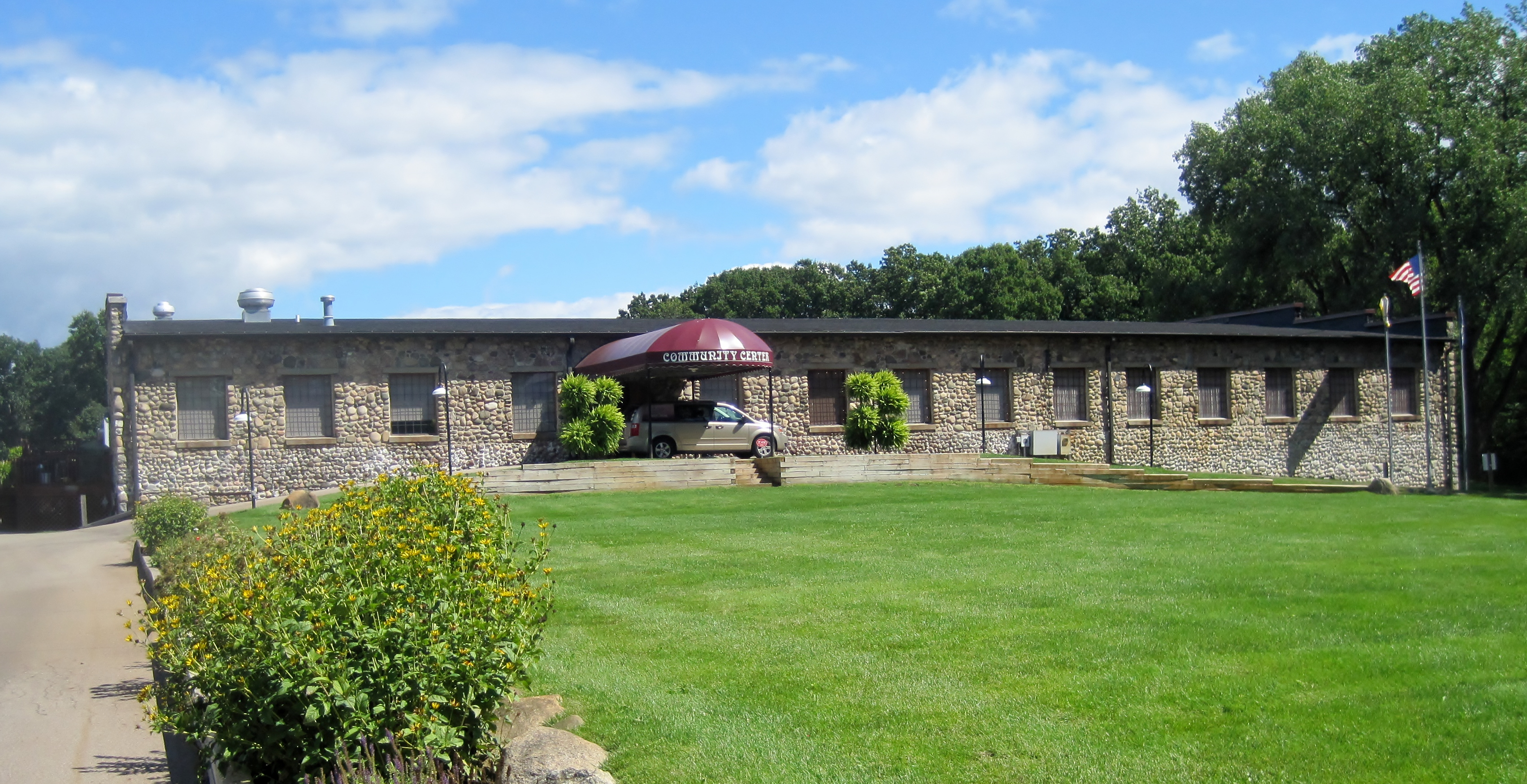
- Main winery building

- Location within Michigan Location within the United States
- Interactive map
- Location: 646 N Nursery, Lawton, Michigan
- Coordinates: 42°10′28″N 85°50′26″W
- Area: 3.8 acres (1.5 ha)
- Built: 1940
- Built by: Ed Schallhorn
- Architectural style: Winery
- NRHP reference No.: 00000222

Significant dates
- Added to NRHP: March 15, 2000
- Designated MSHS: April 17, 1997

The Houppert Winery Complex, now The Old Winery, is a complex of buildings constructed as a winery and located at 646 North Nursery in Lawton, Michigan. It was designated a Michigan State Historic Site in 1997 and listed on the National Register of Historic Places in 2000.

== History ==
Grape growing in the Lawton area stretches back to 1868, when A. B. Jones planted the area's first grape vines. Realizing the potential of grape and wine production, many farmers in eastern Van Buren County began planting grapes in the latter part of the 19th century. In 1903, the Lawton Vineyard Company constructed a winery on this site. The property changed hands often over the next 30 years and was used to make wine and grape juice. In 1933, the property sold to William C. Houppert of Indiana, whose father was a wine master from Alsace-Lorraine who had emigrated to Indianapolis to start a winery.

Production at the winery peaked in 1939, with the winery taking in 200 to 400 tons of grapes daily and employing 40 people. Houppert constructed a new cask building, built around casks purchased from Al Capone's Prima Brewery. However, in 1940, a disastrous fire destroyed the winery. Houppert began rebuilding the winery that year, hiring stonemason Ed Schallhorn to construct a new stone building. Although much of the wine had been saved from the fire, and the winery was back in business shortly, construction on the new winery stretched to 1943.

The financial damage from the fire was severe, and the operation never really recovered. The Houppert Winery collapsed in 1943, and John Turner, president of First National Bank of Lawton and mortgage holder, assumed ownership of the property. Turner already owned another local firm, Michigan Wineries, so he purchased Houppert's equipment and stock and folded the Houppert Winery's operations into his own. Houppert moved to California, but was never able to re-enter the wine-making business.

After John Turner's death, Michigan Wineries eventually became Warner Vineyards, a company which still operates as of 2013. Warner operated the Houppert Winery property until the early 1970s. However, as the equipment aged and wastewater issues became more cumbersome to deal with, Warner decided to close the facility and use it primarily for storage. In 1989, the vats and casks were transferred to another Warner facility, and in 1990, the winery was purchased by the Lawton Lions Club. The Lions Club refurbished the property into a community center and museum, completing renovations in 1993. The property is now known as the Lawton Heritage Community Center and the Lawton Heritage Museum.

== Description ==
The Houppert Winery Complex consists of four structures: the main winery building, deep vat building, steam plant, and warehouse.

The main winery building was constructed in 1940 on the foundation of the original 1903 winery. It is a single story coursed fieldstone structure with a very low-pitched roof, measuring 90 feet (27 m) by 180 feet (55 m). The building runs north-south and has 15 bays on each of the east-west sides. The structure now serves as the community center.

The deep vat building is a concrete structure constructed in 1939 with a low-pitched roof and parapetted ends. A double doorway is located on the east side. The building once contained wine vats sitting in the basement and reaching up to the first-floor ceiling. The basement has been filled in and the building is used for storage.

The steam plant is a concrete block building constructed in 1939 and is similar to the deep vat building. The structure has a shed roof, and once contained a boiler and water tank used to heat the other buildings.

The warehouse is a corrugated metal building constructed in the mid-1950s, with a low-pitched metal roof measuring 90 feet (27 m) by 180 feet (55 m). The main facade has a double door in the center with flanking windows.
