= Antwerp Township, Michigan =

- Township
- Location within the state of Michigan Antwerp Township, Michigan (the United States)
- Coordinates: 42°11′51″N 85°49′37″W
- Country: United States
- State: Michigan
- County: Van Buren

Area
  - Total: 35.1 sq mi (90.9 km^{2})
  - Land: 34.9 sq mi (90.4 km^{2})
  - Water: 0.19 sq mi (0.5 km^{2})
- Elevation: 791 ft (241 m)

Population (2020)
  - Total: 13,425
  - Density: 385/sq mi (149/km^{2})
- Time zone: UTC-5 (Eastern (EST))
  - Summer (DST): UTC-4 (EDT)
- FIPS code: 26-03140
- GNIS feature ID: 1625841
- Website: antwerptownshipmi.gov

Antwerp Township is a civil township of Van Buren County in the U.S. state of Michigan. As of the 2020 census, the township population was 13,425. It was named after the major Belgian city of Antwerp.

== Overview ==
Antwerp Township was formed the 11th of March 1837, just before the organization of Van Buren County. It is located between the village of Paw Paw and Kalamazoo County. The villages of Lawton and Mattawan are located in the township.

In December 1834, Joel Tomlinson settled on Section 22. The next spring, on 10 May 1835, Joseph Woodman moved into a cabin on Section 7, on the Territorial Road, coming from Vermont with his family and brother David Woodman. Joseph's son J.J. Woodman became Speaker of the Michigan House of Representatives from 1869 to 1872.

== Geography ==
According to the United States Census Bureau, the township has a total area of 35.1 square miles (91 km^{2}), of which 34.9 square miles (90 km^{2}) is land and 0.2 square miles (0.52 km^{2}) (0.54%) is water.

== Demographics ==
As of the census of 2000, there were 10,813 people, 3,764 households, and 2,935 families residing in the township. The population density was 309.9 inhabitants per square mile (119.7/km^{2}). There were 3,968 housing units at an average density of 113.7 per square mile (43.9/km^{2}). The racial makeup of the township was 93.54% White, 1.29% African American, 0.35% Native American, 0.52% Asian, 2.19% from other races, and 2.10% from two or more races. Hispanic or Latino of any race were 5.07% of the population.

There were 3,764 households, out of which 42.9% had children under the age of 18 living with them, 62.0% were married couples living together, 11.4% had a female householder with no husband present, and 22.0% were non-families. 17.6% of all households were made up of individuals, and 6.9% had someone living alone who was 65 years of age or older. The average household size was 2.80 and the average family size was 3.16.

In the township the population was spread out, with 29.9% under the age of 18, 7.7% from 18 to 24, 29.8% from 25 to 44, 22.7% from 45 to 64, and 9.8% who were 65 years of age or older. The median age was 35 years. For every 100 females, there were 95.4 males. For every 100 females age 18 and over, there were 92.2 males.

The median income for a household in the township was $50,556, and the median income for a family was $56,424. Males had a median income of $39,363 versus $27,321 for females. The per capita income for the township was $19,418. About 3.9% of families and 5.4% of the population were below the poverty line, including 3.8% of those under age 18 and 10.5% of those age 65 or over.

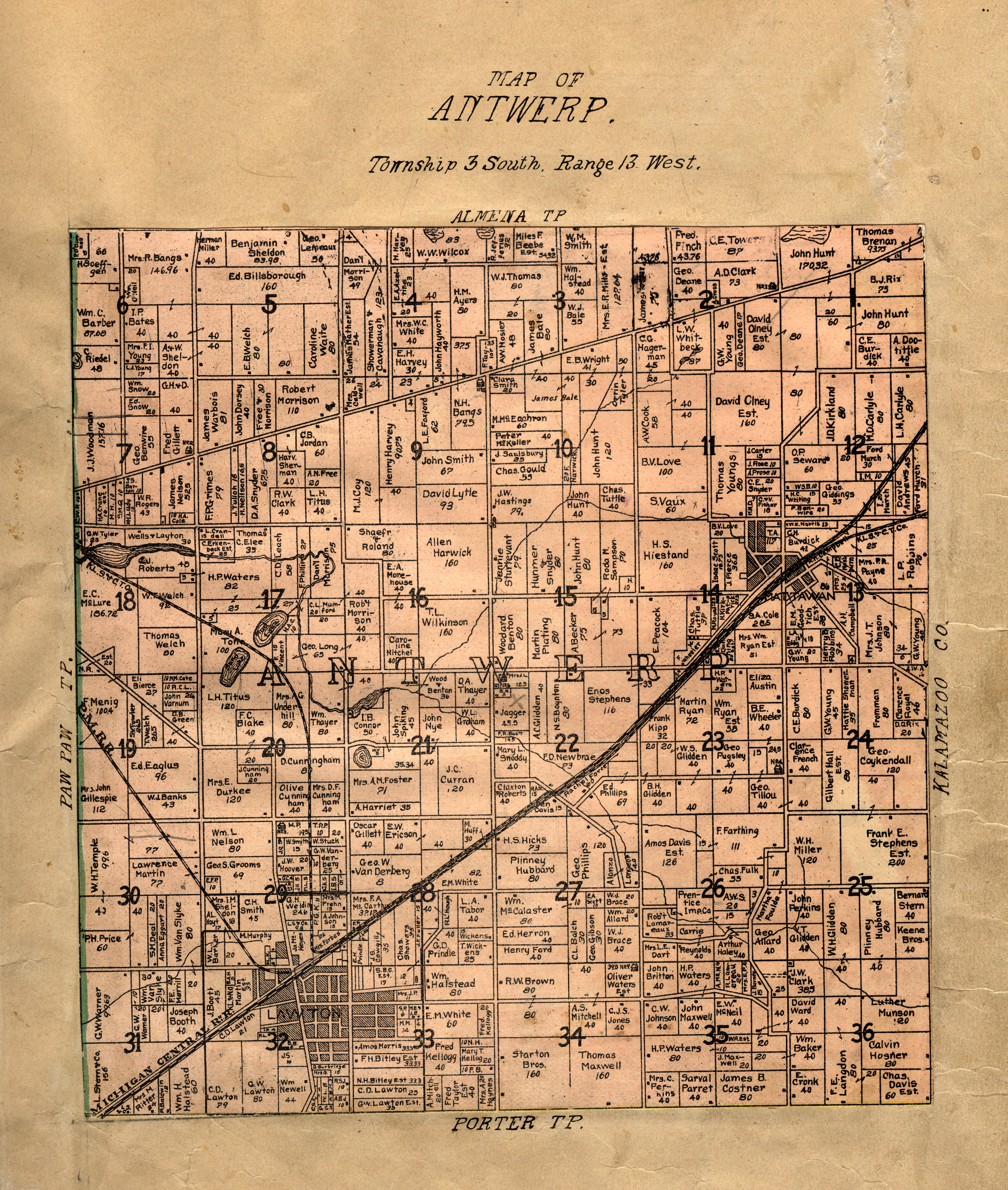
A 1906 cadastral map of Antwerp Township, showing property lines and names of rural landowners
