= Paw Paw, Michigan =

- Village
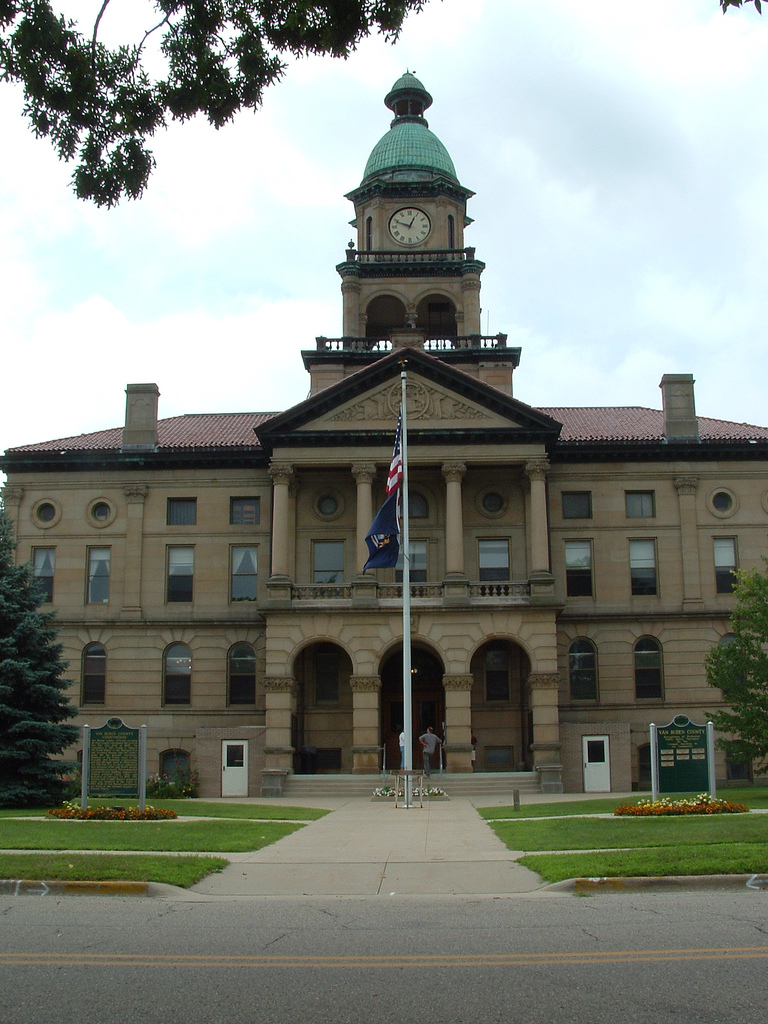
- Van Buren County Courthouse

- Location of Paw Paw, Michigan

- Location within Michigan Location within the United States
- Coordinates: 42°13′2″N 85°53′24″W
- Country: United States
- State: Michigan
- County: Van Buren

Area
  - Total: 2.89 sq mi (7.48 km^{2})
  - Land: 2.66 sq mi (6.90 km^{2})
  - Water: 0.22 sq mi (0.58 km^{2})
- Elevation: 732 ft (223 m)

Population (2020)
  - Total: 3,362
  - Density: 1,261.4/sq mi (487.04/km^{2})
- Time zone: UTC-5 (Eastern (EST))
  - Summer (DST): UTC-4 (EDT)
- ZIP code: 49079
- Area code: 269
- FIPS code: 26-62980
- GNIS feature ID: 634488
- Website: www.pawpaw.net

Paw Paw is a village in and the county seat of Van Buren County, Michigan. The population was 3,362 as of the 2020 census.

== Overview ==
The village is located at the confluence of the east and south branches of the Paw Paw River in the northeast portion of Paw Paw Township. Paw Paw was incorporated in 1837 and is located in the southwestern portion of Michigan, on Interstate 94 (I-94) approximately 20 miles (32 km) west of Kalamazoo. Paw Paw is named for the pawpaw trees which once grew along the Paw Paw River.

In 1832, Rodney Hinckley located a farm on the Paw Paw River. In that year, Pierce Barber also built a sawmill on the Paw Paw River at the west end of what became the village. In 1833, Peter Gremps and Lyman J. Daniels put the sawmill into business, and Gremps is considered the founder of the village of Paw Paw.

The town was the home of African American cookbook author Malinda Russell who published the first known cookbook by a black woman in the United States. She lived in Paw Paw after she fled her Tennessee home, which was raided by traveling gangs of whites in 1864. Her book Domestic Cook Book: Containing a Careful Selection of Useful Receipts for the Kitchen, as a means to provide income for her and her son and earn money to return to Greeneville, Tennessee. Russell self-published her book, in 1866, giving a brief history of her life and stating in the preface to it that she hoped to earn passage to return home from its proceeds. Within months of her publication, the town of Paw Paw was destroyed by fire.

On June 13, 1888, fire again erupted, destroying seven buildings (including 11 businesses and 2 lodges) in the village.

Paw Paw is in a rural location whose primary agricultural product is grapes, which are used both in the local Michigan wine industry and for juice and jellies. The St. Julian Winery and Warner Vineyards started in Paw Paw. Paw Paw has an annual Wine and Harvest Festival, which traditionally occurs the weekend following Labor Day. The Festival features a beer tent, bandstand, live music, a popular grape stomping competition among barefoot locals, carnival foods, and fireworks over scenic Maple Lake. For three days, the village opens up to celebrate its agricultural roots: its fruit-growing, juice, and wine-making industries. Activities in every corner of the village include the traditional grape stomping, wine tasting, 5K run, bicycle classic, and carnival midway, with new fun added each year.

The vignette "Paw Paw for Jesus" was featured on NPR's This American Life.

== Historic sites ==
Listed in the National Register for Historic places is the Van Buren County Courthouse at 212 E. Paw Paw Street, wherein the first election was held in 1837. Renovations were completed in 1999.

== Geography ==
According to the United States Census Bureau, the village has a total area of 2.89 square miles (7.49 km^{2}), of which 2.67 square miles (6.92 km^{2}) is land and 0.22 square miles (0.57 km^{2}) is water.

== Major highways ==
- I-94
- M-40
- Red Arrow Highway

== Demographics ==
Historical population
Census	Pop.	Note	%±
1870	1,428		—
1880	1,482		3.8%
1890	1,391		−6.1%
1900	1,465		5.3%
1910	1,643		12.2%
1920	1,556		−5.3%
1930	1,684		8.2%
1940	1,910		13.4%
1950	2,382		24.7%
1960	2,970		24.7%
1970	3,160		6.4%
1980	3,211		1.6%
1990	3,169		−1.3%
2000	3,363		6.1%
2010	3,534		5.1%
2020	3,362		−4.9%
U.S. Decennial Census

=== 2020 census ===
As of the 2020 census, Paw Paw had a population of 3,362. The median age was 39.6 years. 20.3% of residents were under the age of 18 and 18.6% of residents were 65 years of age or older. For every 100 females there were 90.1 males, and for every 100 females age 18 and over there were 88.7 males age 18 and over.

99.6% of residents lived in urban areas, while 0.4% lived in rural areas.

There were 1,551 households in Paw Paw, of which 26.0% had children under the age of 18 living in them. Of all households, 30.9% were married-couple households, 24.6% were households with a male householder and no spouse or partner present, and 36.8% were households with a female householder and no spouse or partner present. About 41.3% of all households were made up of individuals and 18.3% had someone living alone who was 65 years of age or older.

There were 1,664 housing units, of which 6.8% were vacant. The homeowner vacancy rate was 2.1% and the rental vacancy rate was 5.4%.

Racial composition as of the 2020 census
Race	Number	Percent
White	2,918	86.8%
Black or African American	62	1.8%
American Indian and Alaska Native	28	0.8%
Asian	25	0.7%
Native Hawaiian and Other Pacific Islander	0	0.0%
Some other race	102	3.0%
Two or more races	227	6.8%
Hispanic or Latino (of any race)	285	8.5%

=== 2010 census ===
As of the census of 2010, there were 3,534 people, 1,499 households, and 862 families living in the village. The population density was 1,323.6 inhabitants per square mile (511.0/km^{2}). There were 1,674 housing units at an average density of 627.0 per square mile (242.1/km^{2}). The racial makeup of the village was 92.3% White, 2.3% African American, 0.2% Native American, 0.4% Asian, 2.2% from other races, and 2.7% from two or more races. Hispanic or Latino of any race were 5.9% of the population.

There were 1,499 households, of which 31.2% had children under the age of 18 living with them, 34.6% were married couples living together, 17.5% had a female householder with no husband present, 5.5% had a male householder with no wife present, and 42.5% were non-families. 35.6% of all households were made up of individuals, and 13.2% had someone living alone who was 65 years of age or older. The average household size was 2.27 and the average family size was 2.91.

The median age in the village was 36.4 years. 24.2% of residents were under the age of 18; 9.5% were between the ages of 18 and 24; 27.1% were from 25 to 44; 25.3% were from 45 to 64; and 13.8% were 65 years of age or older. The gender makeup of the village was 48.5% male and 51.5% female.

=== 2000 census ===
As of the census of 2000, there were 3,363 people, 1,417 households, and 855 families living in the village. The population density was 1,262.5 inhabitants per square mile (487.5/km^{2}). There were 1,511 housing units at an average density of 567.3 per square mile (219.0/km^{2}). The racial makeup of the village was 92.83% White, 2.85% African American, 0.83% Native American, 0.27% Asian, 0.06% Pacific Islander, 1.19% from other races, and 1.96% from two or more races. Hispanic or Latino of any race were 2.97% of the population.

There were 1,417 households, out of which 29.7% had children under the age of 18 living with them, 41.2% were married couples living together, 14.9% had a female householder with no husband present, and 39.6% were non-families. 32.7% of all households were made up of individuals, and 12.3% had someone living alone who was 65 years of age or older. The average household size was 2.27 and the average family size was 2.86.

In the village, the population was spread out, with 23.3% under the age of 18, 10.0% from 18 to 24, 30.2% from 25 to 44, 21.5% from 45 to 64, and 15.0% who were 65 years of age or older. The median age was 36 years. For every 100 females, there were 93.5 males. For every 100 females age 18 and over, there were 90.3 males.

The median income for a household in the village was $38,750, and the median income for a family was $50,889. Males had a median income of $36,548 versus $29,559 for females. The per capita income for the village was $21,859. About 1.9% of families and 5.7% of the population were below the poverty line, including 3.1% of those under age 18 and 3.4% of those age 65 or over.

== Education ==
Paw Paw Public Schools is the school district serving the community.

== In popular culture ==
Paw Paw, Michigan is the primary setting of the popular children's musical Dear Edwina.

== Notable people ==
- Jason Babin, football player for Western Michigan, first-round NFL draft pick
- John Bonamego, football head coach at Central Michigan University; previously assistant coach with NFL's Miami Dolphins, Jacksonville Jaguars, Green Bay Packers and Detroit Lions
- Frank R. Gooding, Governor of Idaho 1905–09, U.S. Senator 1921–28; raised in Paw Paw
- Doane Harrison, Oscar-nominated film editor, best known for his long collaboration with director Billy Wilder
- Bill and Wade Killefer, early 20th-century baseball players
- Ricky Knotts, racecar driver killed attempting to qualify for 1981 Daytona 500
- Joseph Labadie, labor leader and political activist
- Ron Labadie, head of scouting for NFL's Miami Dolphins
- Loretta Long, actress, best known as "Susan Robinson" on Sesame Street
- Charlie Maxwell ("Old Paw Paw"), a Detroit Tigers, Boston Red Sox, Baltimore Orioles and Chicago White Sox baseball player
- Jerry Mitchell, Tony Award-winning choreographer
- Don Moorhead, football player for Michigan 1969–1970, Canadian Football League quarterback
- Malinda Russell, cookbook author
- Frederick S. Strong, US Army major general
- A. W. Underwood, a 19th-century Paw Paw native with the purported ability to set items ablaze. Brian Eno's 1974 song about Underwood, "The Paw Paw Negro Blowtorch", references the village.
- Abraham Wechter, master luthier of Wechter Guitars
- Shayne Whittington, NBA basketball player for the Indiana Pacers

== See also ==
- Kalamazoo, Lake Shore and Chicago Railway
- List of reduplicated place names
