= Benton Harbor Area Schools =

School district in Michigan

Address
- 870 Colfax Avenue Benton Harbor, Berrien County, Michigan, 49022; United States
- Coordinates: 42°06′22.8″N 86°26′44.3″W

District information
- Grades: Pre-Kindergarten-12
- Superintendent: Dr. Simone Griffin
- Schools: 6
- Budget: $31,250,000 2022-2023 expenditures
- NCES District ID: 2604830

Students and staff
- Students: 1,240 (2024-2025)
- Teachers: 111.2 (on an FTE basis) (2024-2025)
- Staff: 323.41 FTE (2024-2025)
- Student–teacher ratio: 11.15 (2024-2025)

Other information
- Website: www.bhas.org

Benton Harbor Area Schools is a public school district in West Michigan. It serves Benton Harbor, Benton Heights, Fair Plain, and parts of the townships of Bainbridge, Benton, Hagar, and Sodus.

== History ==
Benton Harbor High School was established in 1872 within Central School (which contained all grades in the district at that time) and the first class graduated in 1876. A new high school was built in 1892.

The current Benton Harbor High School opened in fall 1921 as enrollment in the district was growing quickly. The original building included a 1,200-seat auditorium, which is described in the 1922 yearbook: "With sky lights above a row of large windows on one side, the room is lighted very well during the daytime. The twelve hanging clusters of lights enclosed in beautiful stained glass domes afford especially artistic lighting at night time. It is fully equipped with a motion picture projector in a fire proof cage."

A major addition was built at the high school in 1956. A library addition with a stone facade was built on the east side of the 1921 section around 1962.

Fair Plain Middle School (formerly Fair Plain Junior High) received classroom and gymnasium additions in 1960. Prior to that it was known as Central School.

Until the consolidation done in the mid-1960s certain out-lying areas, such as Fair Plain, had their own independent school districts.

In 2007, the district hired a new superintendent, Carole Schmidt. The hiring of Schmidt was notable because she left her job as superintendent of the St. Joseph Public School District. Schmidt is the first white superintendent of the Benton Harbor School District in decades.

Declining enrollment and less revenue have challenged the district. In 2011, the district was under review by the state Department of Education due to its poor financial health, which then-superintendent Leonard Seawood said could be mitigated by layoffs and school closures. In 2019, the state offered the district a plan to save itself financially, which included closing the district's high school. The school board rejected the state's plan and developed its own turnaround plan, approved by the board in 2020. The district began the 2020-2021 school year with no teacher vacancies and negotiating with the state to forgive its debt.

=== Desegregation case ===
In 1967, district parent Barbara Jean Berry alleged that the district was illegally segregated. She claimed that Black students were concentrated in certain schools and subjected to inferior conditions in building maintenance, supplies, and equipment. On behalf of her and her children, as well as other Black students in the district, the NAACP filed suit, beginning a court battle that would play out over nearly a quarter century. The case became a class-action lawsuit and, in 1977, a federal court ruled that the district was intentionally segregated. In 1978, Coloma Community Schools, Eau Claire Public Schools, the state of Michigan, and the Berrien County Intermediate School District were found liable for contributing to segregated conditions in majority-Black Benton Harbor. The court found that Coloma and Eau Claire had annexed predominantly white areas of Benton Harbor's district into their districts. As part of the desegregation order, the two districts were required to accept voluntary transfer students from Benton Harbor to increase racial integration.

Between 1981 and 2001, when the program ended, thousands of students from Benton Harbor participated in the program, with at one point about 800 students per day boarding school buses for Coloma and Eau Claire. Some students from those districts also transferred to Benton Harbor. In order to achieve more racially balanced schools, Benton Harbor established magnet programs open to students from across the district. It also closed three majority-white schools and reassigned their students to other schools.

== School Board ==
The school board governs the school district. As of 2026, the board president is DaShuna Robinson. Board members are: Vice President Trenton Bowens, Secretary Reinaldo Tripplett, Treasurer Matthew Bradley, Trustees Stephanie Rockette-Martin, Elnora Gavin, and Angela Doyle.

== Superintendents ==
- Renee Williams c. 1992 to 2002
- Dr. Paula R. Dawning 2002-2007
- Dr. Carole Schmidt 2007-2010
- Dr. Leonard Seawood 2010-2015
- Dr. Shelly Walker 2016-2018
- Dr. Robert Herrea 2018-2019 (supervised by state and not local board of education)
- Patricia Robinson Interim 2016; 2018; 2019-2020
- Dr. Andre Townsel 2020-2022
- Dr. Kelvin Butts Interim 2022-23

== Schools ==
Schools in Benton Harbor Area Schools district
School	Address	Notes
Benton Harbor High School	870 Colfax Avenue, Benton Harbor	Grades 9–12
C.A.P.E. Center (Career and Alternative Pathways in Education)	636 Pipestone Street, Benton Harbor	Grades 6-12. Virtual/alternative education
Fair Plain Middle School	120 E Napier Avenue, Benton Harbor	Grades 6-8
Martin Luther King Jr. Elementary	750 E Britain Avenue, Benton Harbor	Grades 1–3
Fair Plain East Elementary	1998 Union Avenue, Benton Harbor	Grades 4–5
Discovery Enrichment Center	465 S. McCord Street, Benton Harbor	Grades PreK-K. Formerly McCord Junior High School.
