= Eau Claire Public Schools =

School district in Michigan, United States

Address
- 6190 West Main Street Eau Claire, Berrien County, Michigan, 49111; United States

District information
- Grades: PreKindergarten–12
- Superintendent: Ann Cluff
- Schools: 4
- Budget: $10,417,000 2022–2023 expenditures
- NCES District ID: 2612810

Students and staff
- Students: 587 (2024–2025)
- Teachers: 57.55 (on an FTE basis) (2024–2025)
- Staff: 106.65 FTE (2024–2025)
- Student–teacher ratio: 10.2 (2024–2025)
- District mascot: Beavers

Other information
- Website: www.eauclaireps.com

Eau Claire Public Schools is a public school district in the Michiana region of Michigan. In Berrien County, it serves Eau Claire and parts of the townships of Bainbridge, Berrien, Pipestone, and Sodus. In Cass County, it serves part of Silver Creek Township.

== History ==
Eau Claire school district's high school courses were added in 1887. On January 9, 1919, Eau Claire's only school burned down and school was then temporarily held in a church. On April 18, 1919, that building also caught fire, but minimal damage was done. The school was rebuilt later that year. The new school was located at 6190 West Main Street and is currently used as the district administration building. Additions were built in 1936 and 1950.

Beulah Lybrook Elementary was built in 1960. Its namesake retired from teaching elementary school in 1964. She had taught in the district for 45 years.

Voters approved funding for the current high school building in December 1971. The school opened in January 1973.

=== Benton Harbor desegregation case ===
In 1967, the NAACP accused the nearby Benton Harbor Area Schools of racial discrimination, alleging that Black students were concentrated in certain schools and subjected to unequal conditions in building maintenance, supplies, and equipment. The case became a class-action lawsuit and, in 1977, a federal court ruled in favor of the plaintiffs. In 1978, Eau Claire Public Schools, Coloma Community Schools, the state of Michigan, and the Berrien County Intermediate School District were found liable for contributing to segregated conditions in majority-Black Benton Harbor. The court found that Coloma and Eau Claire had annexed predominantly white areas of Benton Harbor's district into their districts. As part of the desegregation order, the two districts were required to accept voluntary transfer students from Benton Harbor to increase racial integration.

Between 1981 and 2001, thousands of students from Benton Harbor participated in the program, with about 800 students per day boarding school buses for Coloma and Eau Claire. In Eau Claire, racial integration increased as the percentage of Black students went from 8 percent in 1981 to 28 percent in the mid-1980s. The program ended in 2001.

== Schools ==
Schools in Eau Claire Public Schools district
School	Address	Notes
Eau Claire Middle/High School	7450 Hochberger Road, Eau Claire	Grades 6-12; built 1973
Lybrook Elementary	6238 West Main Street, Eau Claire	Grades PreK-5; built 1960
W-A-Y Eau Claire	7450 Hochberger Road, Eau Claire	Online alternative high school
