= M-139 (Michigan highway) =

State highway in Berrien County, Michigan, United States

M-139
- M-139 highlighted in red

Route information
- Maintained by MDOT
- Length: 26.487 mi (42.627 km)
- Existed: September 22, 1929–present

Major junctions
- South end: US 12 near Niles
- I-94 near Benton Harbor
- North end: BL I-94 in Benton Harbor

Location
- Country: United States
- State: Michigan
- Counties: Berrien

Highway system
- Michigan State Trunkline Highway System; Interstate; US; State; Byways
← M-138	→ M-140

M-139 is a state trunkline highway entirely within Berrien County in the US state of Michigan. The highway starts at US Highway 12 (US 12) southwest of Niles and runs through rural areas of the county to terminate at an intersection with Business Loop Interstate 94 (BL I-94) in Benton Harbor. The highway runs parallel to the St. Joseph River, crossing the river several times as it follows a set of roads previously used for US 31 in the area. The highway was first designated in the 1930s as a bypass of the Benton Harbor and St. Joseph area. Its termini have been moved over the years since, extending and contracting the length of the highway between Niles and Benton Harbor. M-139 now serves to provide access through the area from a set of bypasses consisting of I-94 and US 31.

== Route description ==
M-139 begins at a junction with US 12 southwest of Niles in Bertrand Township. The highway travels northeasterly along Chicago Road through farm fields and residential neighborhoods. The trunkline turns north along Lincoln Avenue and then east on Main Street to run into downtown Niles. Main Street crosses the St. Joseph River, and at the intersection with Front Street, M-139 turns north along that street whose name becomes "Old US 31" at the Niles city limit. The highway runs parallel to the river as both exit the downtown area. M-139 turns toward the northwest on the outskirts of town, running through farm fields. The trunkline passes Webster and Long lakes as it crosses mixed forest and residential areas between Niles and Berrien Springs.

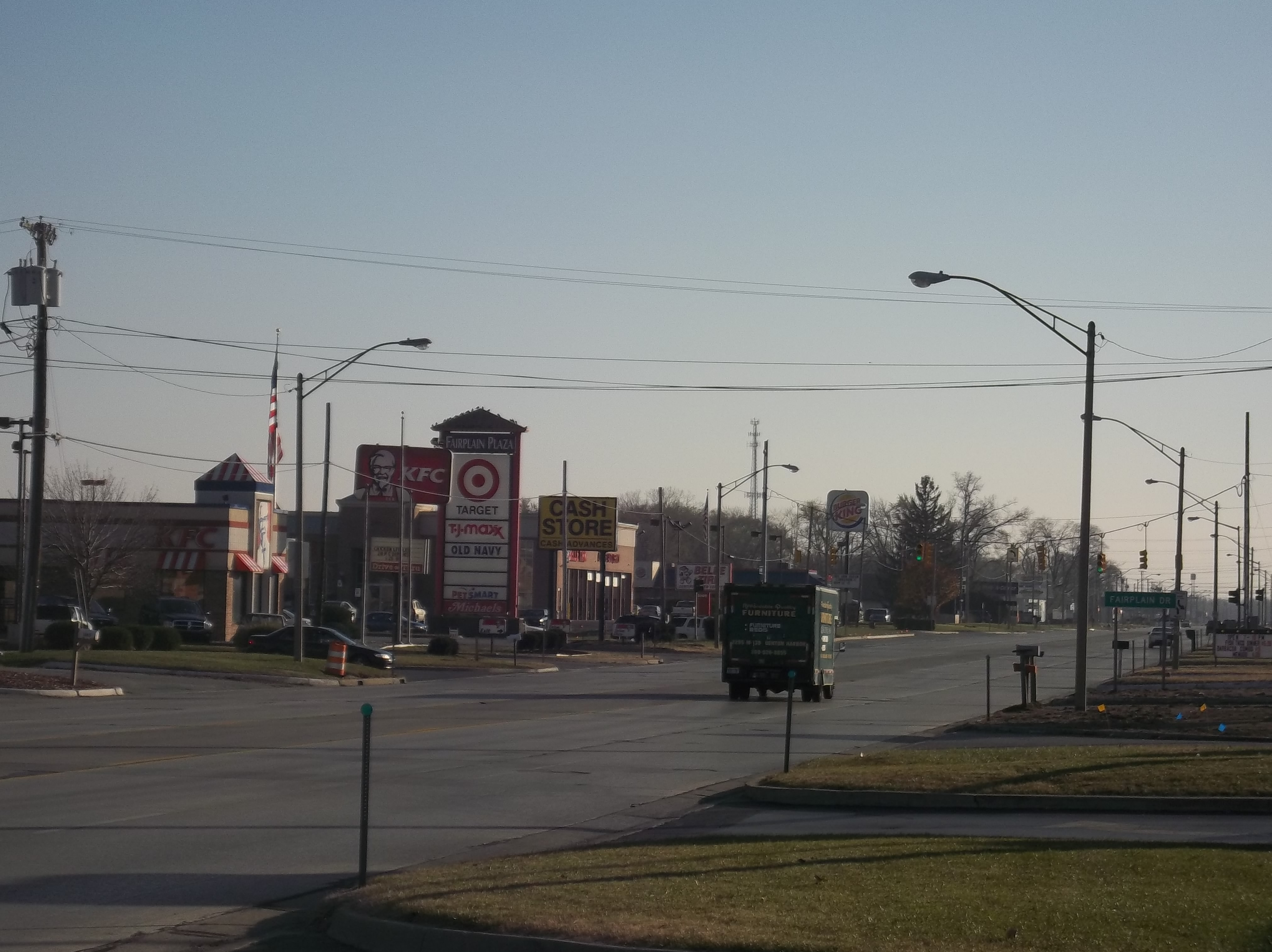
M-139 in Fair Plain, near Benton Harbor

Entering Berrien Springs, M-139 curves around part of Lake Chapin. North of the dam that forms Lake Chapin from the St. Joseph River, the highway follows Ferry Street to the southwest to cross the river. In downtown Berrien Springs, the trunkline then turns northwesterly along St. Joseph Avenue to pass Andrews University. Northwest of the college, M-139 crosses US 31 (St. Joseph Valley Parkway). From there the highway travels northwesterly through Royalton Township through farm fields parallel to the St. Joseph River. M-139 follows Niles Road to the community of Scottdale where it turns northward along Scottdale Road at an intersection with M-63. M-139 crosses the St. Joseph River one last time south of the interchange with I-94 at its exit 28; M-139 then passes through the community of Fair Plain and enters the eastern edge of Benton Harbor. Before terminating at BL I-94 (Main Street) in Benton Harbor, the highway splits into a one-way pair just north of Empire Avenue. Northbound traffic is routed along Martin Luther King Drive while southbound traffic flows on Fair Avenue.

M-139 is maintained by the Michigan Department of Transportation (MDOT) like other state highways in Michigan. As a part of these maintenance responsibilities, the department tracks the volume of traffic that uses the roadways under its jurisdiction. These volumes are expressed using a metric called annual average daily traffic, which is a statistical calculation of the average daily number of vehicles on a segment of roadway. MDOT's surveys in 2011 showed that the highest traffic levels along M-139 were the 12,248 vehicles daily between the intersections with Fairland and Deans Hill/Pokagon roads south of Berrien Springs; the lowest counts were the 1,576 vehicles per day in downtown Niles. The only section of M-139 that have been listed on the National Highway System (NHS) is from the interchange with US 31 northward. The NHS is a network of roads important to the country's economy, defense, and mobility.

== History ==
M-139 was designated as a state trunkline by 1931 from US 31 at Scottdale to US 12 in Benton Harbor. In late 1953 or early 1954 M-139 was extended westward along US 12 and then northward along Paw Paw Avenue to meet a new bypass routing of US 31 north of Benton Harbor. US 31 was rerouted to follow what is now the I-196 freeway in 1963. At that time, US 31 was then routed along I-94 and M-139 to Scottdale. The following year, the concurrency was removed when M-139 was truncated to end at I-94/US 31. The northern extension on Paw Paw Avenue was turned back to local control, truncating the northern end of M-139 to the intersection with BL I-94 (previously US 12).

Plans for M-139 to be extended on a new east-west facility north of downtown Benton Harbor were halted in 1965 when the city and the state disagreed on how best to traverse a railroad; the project had been canceled by February 21, 1966.

On August 27, 2003, the St. Joseph Valley Parkway freeway carrying US 31 was completed from northwest of Berrien Springs (exit 15) to Napier Avenue near Benton Harbor (exit 24). The former section of M-139 replaced by US 31 was once again designated M-139, with M-139 extending further along the former US 31 to the freeway's exit 15. In 2008, M-139 was planned to extend southerly to end at Main Street (Business US 12, Bus. US 12) in Niles along the unsigned state trunkline OLD US 31 and Bus. US 31, but after the City of Niles announced its plan to take over maintenance of the section of East Main Street between Front Street/Bus. US 31 and Fifth Street/M-51 in order to ban trucks, the plan was revised to extend M-139 further south, replacing the Bus. US 12 designation southwesterly to US 12. The extension was executed on March 5, 2010, prior to route marker installation.

== Major intersections ==
The entire highway is in Berrien County.

Location	mi	km	Destinations	Notes
Bertrand Township	0.000	0.000	US 12 – Sturgis, New Buffalo	
Niles Township	4.730	7.612	M-140 north – Watervliet, South Haven	
Niles Township	6.455	10.388	Walton Road to US 31	Former Bus. US 31
Oronoko Township	14.814	23.841	US 31 (St. Joseph Valley Parkway) – Benton Harbor, South Bend	Exit 15 on US 31
Scottdale	21.269	34.229	M-63 north – St. Joseph	
Fair Plain	23.028	37.060	I-94 – Detroit, Chicago	Exit 28 on I-94
Benton Harbor	26.487	42.627	BL I-94	
1.000 mi = 1.609 km; 1.000 km = 0.621 mi
