= Coloma Community Schools =

School district in Michigan, United States

Address
- 269 West St. Joseph Street Coloma, Berrien County, Michigan, 49038; United States

District information
- Motto: Inspire to Achieve. Empower for Success.
- Grades: Pre-K–12
- Superintendent: Dave Ehlers
- Schools: 4
- Budget: $19,568,000 2022-2023 expenditures
- NCES District ID: 2610380

Students and staff
- Students: 1,095 (2024-2025)
- Teachers: 66.9 (on an FTE basis) (2024-2025)
- Staff: 137.76 FTE (2024-2025)
- Student–teacher ratio: 16.37 (2024-2025)

Other information
- Website: www.ccs.coloma.org

Coloma Community Schools is a public school district in West Michigan, United States. In Berrien County, it serves Coloma, Lake Michigan Beach, part of Paw Paw Lake, and parts of the townships of Bainbridge, Benton, Coloma, and Hagar. It also serves part of Covert Township in Van Buren County.

== History ==
The first school in Coloma was established in 1837. The first brick school was built in 1893, and had four classrooms. The first high school class graduated in 1895. Despite additions, the building was overcrowded by the 1920s and a new school began construction in 1928. It was completed in January 1930 and served as the high school for many years.

In 1958, seven rural school districts consolidated with Coloma's school district. The following schools (some of them one-room schoolhouses) joined Coloma: Boyer, Bundy, Brick, Clymer, Gray, Ingraham, and Washington.

The current Coloma High School opened in April 1966 and was renovated in 1992. When the current high school opened, the former high school became the junior high. In 1971, a new junior high was built on the high school site, and the old high school was also expanded to become an intermediate school.

The dedication of a gymnasium addition between the high and junior high schools took place on December 3, 1992, and featured local resident Muhammad Ali.

=== Benton Harbor desegregation case ===
In 1967, the NAACP accused the nearby Benton Harbor Area Schools of racial discrimination, alleging that Black students were concentrated in certain schools and subjected to unequal conditions in building maintenance, supplies, and equipment. The case became a class-action lawsuit and, in 1977, a federal court ruled in favor of the plaintiffs. In 1978, Coloma Community Schools, Eau Claire Public Schools, the state of Michigan, and the Berrien County Intermediate School District were found liable for contributing to segregated conditions in majority-Black Benton Harbor. The court found that Coloma and Eau Claire had annexed predominantly white areas of Benton Harbor's district into their districts. As part of the desegregation order, the two districts were required to accept voluntary transfer students from Benton Harbor to increase racial integration.

Between 1981 and 2001, thousands of students from Benton Harbor participated in the program, with about 800 students per day boarding school buses for Coloma and Eau Claire. In Coloma, racial integration increased as the percentage of Black students went from 1 percent before the program to 26 percent in 1999. The program ended in 2001.

== Schools ==
Schools in Coloma Public Schools district
School	Address	Notes
Coloma High School	300 West St. Joseph, Coloma	Grades 9–12. Built 1966.
Coloma Junior High	302 West St. Joseph St., Coloma	Grades 6–8. Built 1971.
Coloma Intermediate School	274 S West Street, Coloma	Grades 4–5. Built 1930.
Coloma Elementary	262 S West Street, Coloma	Grades K–3
Little Learners Preschool	262 S West Street, Coloma	Preschool housed at Coloma Elementary
