= Farmers Creek =

Farmers Creek can refer to:

- Farmers Creek (Iowa), a tributary of the North Fork Maquoketa River
- Farmers Creek (Michigan)
- Farmers Creek, Michigan, an unincorporated community
- Farmers Creek Township, Jackson County, Iowa, township of Iowa
