= 1904–05 Michigan State Normal Normalites men's basketball team =

American college basketball season

1904–05 Michigan State Normal Normalites men's basketball
- Conference: Independent
- Record: 8–3
- Head coach: Wilbur P. Bowen (2nd season)
- Assistant coaches: Herbert Chapman; John Thomas
- Home arena: Gymnasium

The 1904–05 team finished with a record 8–3. It was the second year for head coach Wilbur P. Bowen. The team captain was Edward O’Brien and the team managers were Herbert Chapman and John Thomas.

== Roster ==
Number	Name	Position	Class	Hometown
	Edward O'Brien	Guard	Senior	Berrien Center, MI
	W.B. Smith	Guard	Junior	Ubly, MI
	Clare Olney	Guard		
	Roy Head	Center	Junior	Milan, MI
	Grover Thomas	Forward		
	Roy Sprague	Forward	Senior	Farmington, MI
	Carpenter	Forward		
	Hugh Osborne	Forward	Senior	Lapeer, MI
	Mowry			
	Jordan			
	Oren Evans		Senior	Shelby Charter Township, MI

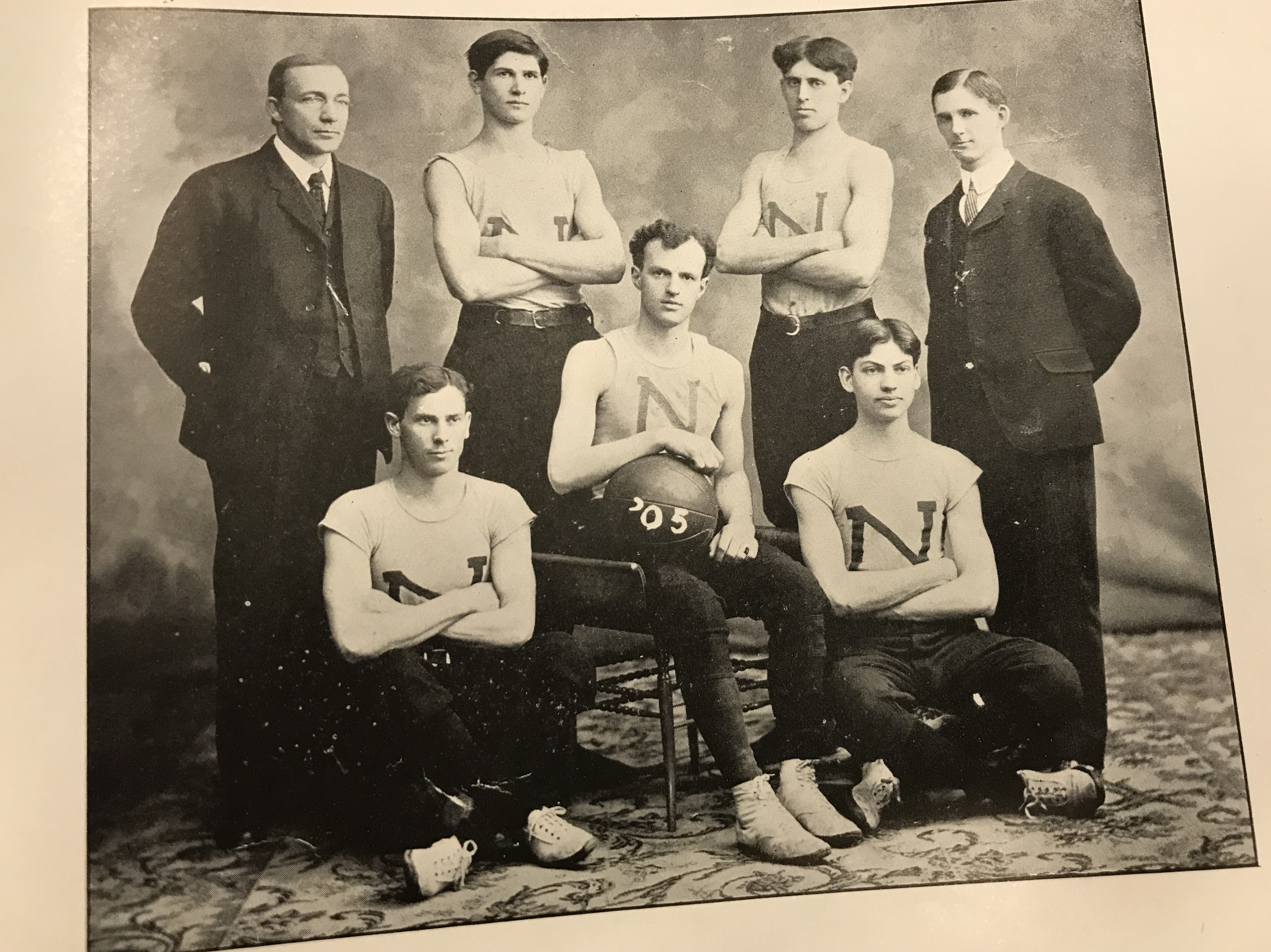
1905 Michigan State Normal College Men's Basketball Team

== Schedule ==
Date time, TV	Rank^{#}	Opponent^{#}	Result	Record	Site (attendance) city, state
Non-conference regular season
December 10, 1904*		Michigan Engineers	W 32-21	1-0	Gymnasium; Ypsilanti, MI
January 7, 1905*; 7:00		Alumni	W 18-10	Exhibition	Gymnasium; Ypsilanti, MI
January 13, 1905*; Canceled		at Alma College			Alma, MI
January 14, 1905*		Detroit YMCA	W 16-14	2-0	Gymnasium; Ypsilanti, MI
January 20, 1905*		Detroit Cooper			Gymnasium; Ypsilanti, MI
January 21, 1905*		at Adrian College	W 19-18	3-0	Gymnasium; Ypsilanti, MI
January 21, 1905*; Canceled		at Assumption University			Windsor, Ontario
January 28, 1905*		Detroit AC	W 19-18	4-0	Gymnasium; Ypsilanti, MI
February 4, 1905*		at Detroit AC	L 12-44	4-1	Detroit, MI
February 10, 1905*		at Michigan School for the Deaf			Flint, MI
February 11, 1905*		at Michigan School for the Deaf	W 32-21	5-1	Flint, MI
February 18, 1905*		at Adrian College	L 19-29	5-2	Adrian, MI
February 24, 1905*		Alma College			Gymnasium; Ypsilanti, MI
1905*		Ann Arbor YMCA	W 21-19	6-2	Gymnasium; Ypsilanti, MI
March 4, 1905*		Michigan School for the Deaf	W 23-18	7-2	Gymnasium; Ypsilanti, MI
March 4, 1905*		Detroit AC			Gymnasium; Ypsilanti, MI
March 10, 1905*		Ann Arbor YMCA	L 24-28	7-3	Gymnasium; Ypsilanti, MI
March 11, 1905*		U of M Lits			Gymnasium; Ypsilanti, MI
March 18, 1905*		Alumni	W 39-19	8-3	Gymnasium; Ypsilanti, MI
*Non-conference game. ^{#}Rankings from AP Poll. (#) Tournament seedings in parentheses. All times are in Eastern Time.

== Game summaries ==
=== January 14, 1905 ===
Starting lineup for was Head (Center), O'Brien (Guard), W.D. Smith (Guard), Sprague (Forward), and Thomas (Forward). The Normals led at the half 9-7. O'Brien scored two baskets for the Normals. Media Guide has a score of 24-16 but Detroit Free Press, Aurora, Michigan Normal News all have 16-14.

=== February 04, 1905 ===
In the first half, Sprague scored the only basket from the field during the loss. Sprague scored ten more points from the foul line. Thomas, Head, Smith, and O'Brien also started the game. The score at the end of the first half was 6-29 in favor of DAC. Media guide shows score of 12-44, Detroit Free Press has 12-45, and Aurora shows 14-54.

=== February 18, 1905 ===
Adrian has a score of 20-29.
