= Hinchman, Michigan =

- Unincorporated community
- Location within the state of Michigan Hinchman (the United States)
- Coordinates: 41°58′20″N 86°25′39″W
- Country: United States
- State: Michigan
- County: Berrien
- Township: Oronoko
- Elevation: 659 ft (201 m)
- Time zone: UTC-5 (Eastern (EST))
  - Summer (DST): UTC-4 (EDT)
- ZIP code(s): 49103
- Area code: 269
- GNIS feature ID: 628340

Hinchman is an unincorporated community located in Berrien County, Michigan. It is centrally located near the intersection of Scottsdale and East Hinchman Road in Oronoko Township near the cities of Bridgman and Stevensville.
