= Expo Arena =

Multi-use facility

Coordinates: 41°57′07.2″N 86°21′10.9″W

Berrien County Youth Fair Indoor Expo Complex is a 2,896-seat indoor arena located in Berrien Springs, Michigan, built as part of the Berrien County Fairgrounds. It will be used for concerts, sports, conventions and graduation ceremonies. The arena will be funded entirely by donations and corporate sponsorships.

== Amenities ==
The 96,000-square-foot indoor arena will feature 18 luxury suites and 66,500 square feet of arena floor space. Of the 2,896 permanent seats at the arena, 1,866 are chairback seats.

The Expo Arena will also feature an adjacent 120,000-square-foot stable and stalling area with 504 stalls, a 20,400-square-foot warm-up ring and six wash bays. Both the arena and the stable and stalling area will be connected by a 24,000-square-foot concourse.

The arena will be designed to compete with the Joyce Center and other venues in South Bend, Indiana for concerts and other events in the Michiana region. The arena, expected to be completed in April 2013, is expected to be built in seven months at a cost of $17–$20 million.
