= M-63 (Michigan highway) =

State highway in Berrien County, Michigan, United States

M-63
- M-63 highlighted in red

Route information
- Maintained by MDOT
- Length: 16.141 mi (25.976 km)
- Existed: 1986–present
- Tourist routes: Lake Michigan Circle Tour; West Michigan Pike Pure Michigan Byway

Major junctions
- South end: M-139 at Scottdale
- I-94 / BL I-94 at St. Joseph
- North end: I-196 / US 31 near Hagar Shores

Location
- Country: United States
- State: Michigan
- Counties: Berrien

Highway system
- Michigan State Trunkline Highway System; Interstate; US; State; Byways
← M-62	→ M-64

M-63 is a state trunkline highway in the US state of Michigan that runs from M-139 at Scottdale through the cities of Benton Harbor and St. Joseph to Interstate 196/US Highway 31 (I-196/US 31) at exit 7 just outside Hagar Shores. The trunkline runs through residential areas south of St. Joseph and through the central business districts of the twin cities. Further north, M-63 runs along the Lake Michigan shoreline.

All of M-63's routing was part of US 33 before that highway's truncation south of Niles in 1986. A previous designation of M-63 was used farther north in Lake and Osceola counties from 1919 until 1961. Since the current designation was created, the Michigan Department of Transportation (MDOT) has worked on reconfiguring parts of the roadway in the early part of the 21st century. The bridge M-63 uses to cross the St. Joseph River, the Blossomland Bridge, has been identified as an historic structure using a rare design. The bridge itself dates back to the late 1940s.

== Route description ==
M-63 begins at the intersection of Niles, Scottdale and Miners roads southeast of St. Joseph in Royalton Township. M-139 runs on Niles Road northwest from Berrien Springs to this point and on Scottdale Road north of the intersection. M-63 follows Miners Road west and then Niles Road northwest of the junction, parallel to the St. Joseph River through residential areas on the outskirts of the twin cities. The highway meets Interstate 94 (I-94) at the latter's exit 27 and continues through St. Joseph Township to the city of St. Joseph. In the city, after Washington Avenue, Niles Road becomes Niles Avenue and turns north. As part of its maintenance duties, the MDOT tracks traffic volumes on the state highways in a metric called average annual daily traffic (AADT), which is a calculation of the average traffic level for any day of a year. The roadway segment along Niles Avenue north of the Napier Avenue intersection in 2009 had the highest traffic levels along all of M-63 at 22,263 vehicles.

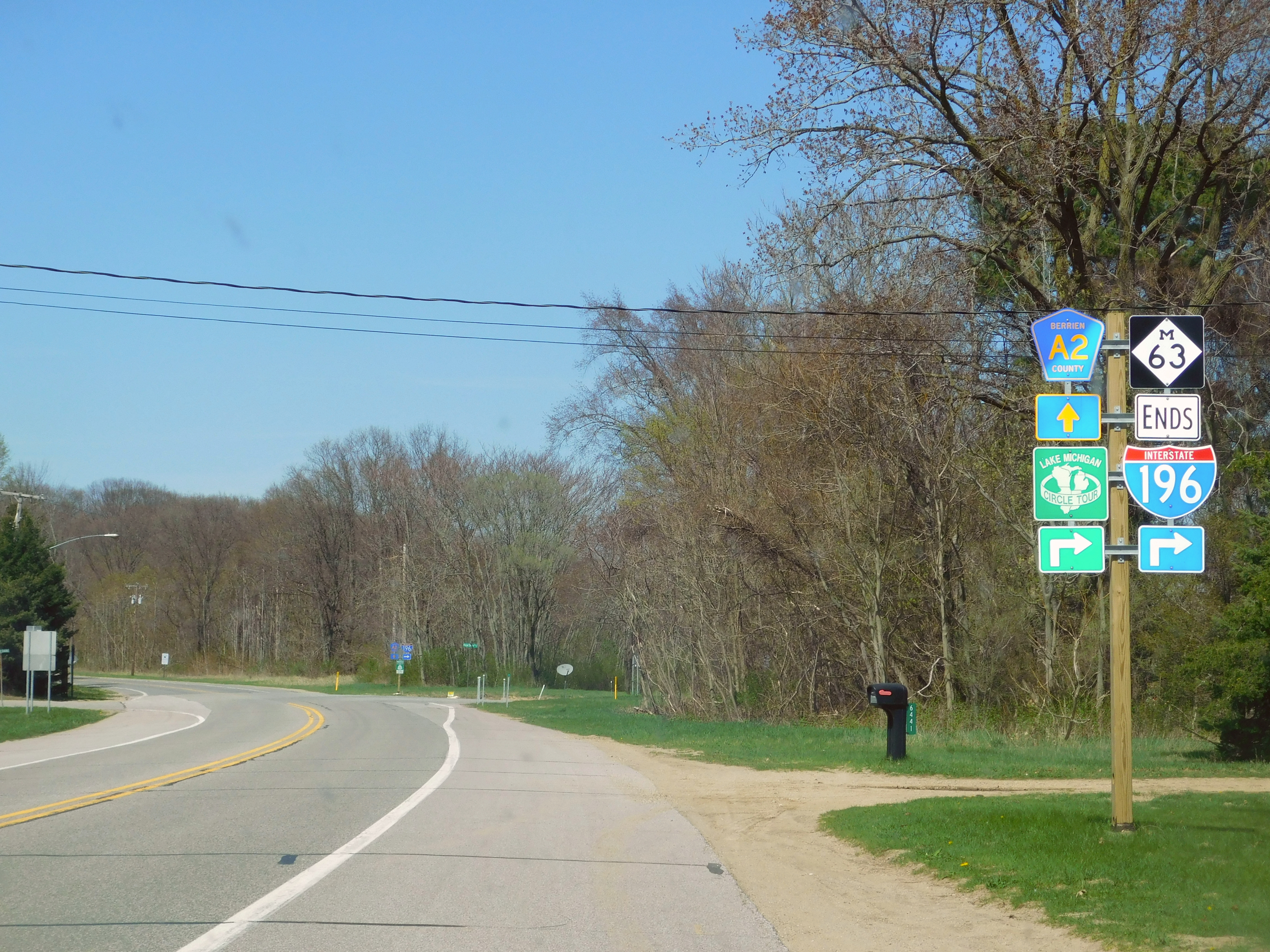
M-63 at the junction with Blue Star Highway north of Hagar Shores

At Main Street, Niles Avenue ends, and M-63 joins Business Loop I-94 (BL I-94) on Main Street into and through the downtown business district. The two highways continue together running concurrently to Ship and Port streets. These two streets form a one-way pair running east to carry BL I-94 to and from a separate bridge over the St. Joseph River. M-63 continues along Main Street across the river into Benton Harbor, Michigan where it follows the Lake Michigan shoreline along a short expressway segment. The trunkline exits Benton Harbor near the headquarters of the Whirlpool Corporation. North of town, the highway provides access to many lakeshore properties north of Benton Harbor at it continues northeasterly along the shoreline to the community of Lake Michigan Beach. When the highway meets Hagar Shore Road, M-63 turns east along that roadway to an interchange with I-196/US 31. The shoreline roadway continues northeast as A-2 (Blue Star Highway) while M-63 terminates at an interchange with I-196/US 31. This northernmost segment of the highway had the lowest AADT measurement in 2009 when calculated by MDOT at 2,855 vehicles.

Various highways in the United States are listed as a part of the National Highway System (NHS), a system of roads important to the nation's economy, defense, and mobility. M-63 has been listed as a part of the NHS from its southern terminus to the northern junction with BL I-94 in St. Joseph. As the closest state highway to Lake Michigan in the area, M-63 from the southern junction with BL I-94 to its northern terminus has been used as a part of the Lake Michigan Circle Tour, a tourist route that circles Lake Michigan.

== History ==
=== Previous designation ===
M-63 originally ran from Peacock in Lake County west through Luther to M-13 (later US 131) in Osceola County on July 1, 1919. This highway was extended in 1930 along US 131 to Tustin and then to a terminus with M-66 in Marion. At the same time, M-37 was extended north from Baldwin to meet M-63 east of Peacock. This eastern extension was truncated in 1932 when it was redesignated as part of M-61. A short connector roadway, M-179, was designated in 1935 between M-63 and US 131, forming a small triangle of highways. The western end was shortened in 1939 so that M-63 ended at M-37 instead of continuing west to Peacock. The M-179 designation was decommissioned in 1959 or 1960, removing that short highway from the state trunkline highway system. M-63 was decommissioned in 1961 when the roadway was transferred back to local control.

=== Current designation ===
The current designation of M-63 was created in 1986. Before the designation, US 33 ran north into Michigan south of Niles. From there it followed US 31 north to Scottdale and ran alone to St. Joseph and Benton Harbor. When US 33 was truncated back to Niles, M-63 was commissioned in its place along the route it now follows. The numbering change happened in September 1986.

The expressway portion of M-63 is a relic of a now revised plan of a freeway corridor through the St. Joseph–Benton Harbor area. The highway was significantly reconfigured in 2000–2002, with the overpass over the industrial access road to Whirlpool's warehouse in Benton Harbor and a rail line removed and rebuilt in late 2000 through early 2001, and one of the two grade-separated interchanges, at Klock Road, demolished and downgraded to an at-grade intersection in 2002. Today, there are only two overpasses over smaller roads existing on this stretch of expressway.

In 2016, all of M-63 was designated as part of the West Michigan Pike Pure Michigan Byway.

=== Blossomland Bridge ===
The Blossomland Bridge over the St. Joseph River is eligible to be listed on the National Register of Historic Places. The span is a Scherzer rolling-lift bascule, a type of moveable bridge. The bridge was built as part of a 1940s plan to relocate US 31 through St. Joseph and Benton Harbor. Those plans were delayed by World War II. The bridge was completed in late 1948 using the rare design prepared by a firm from Chicago that specialized in bascule bridges. The state paid a total of $1.3 million for what was called "the largest bridge ever built under the auspices of the State Highway Department".

== Major intersections ==
The entire highway is in Berrien County.

Location	mi	km	Destinations	Notes
Royalton Township	0.000	0.000	M-139 – Berrien Springs, Benton Harbor	
St. Joseph Township	1.609– 1.630	2.589– 2.623	I-94 – Detroit, Chicago	Exit 27 on I-94
St. Joseph	5.255	8.457	BL I-94 west / LMCT west	Southern end of BL I-94 and LMCT concurrencies
St. Joseph	5.786– 5.850	9.312– 9.415	BL I-94 east	Northern end of BL I-94 concurrency; BL I-94 follows two one-way streets: Ship and Port streets
Benton Harbor	6.268	10.087	Upton Drive	Former northbound exit and southbound entrance
Benton Harbor	6.268	10.087	Whitwam Drive	Northbound exit only
Benton Harbor	6.896	11.098	Klock Road	Former modified cloverleaf interchange with flyovers from eastbound Klock Road to northbound M-63 and westbound Klock Road to southbound M-63; now an at-grade intersection
Lake Michigan Beach	15.934	25.643	A-2 north (Blue Star Highway)	Southern terminus of A-2
Lake Michigan Beach	16.141	25.976	I-196 / US 31 / LMCT north – Holland, Grand Rapids	Exit 7 on I-196/US 31; northern end of LMCT concurrency
1.000 mi = 1.609 km; 1.000 km = 0.621 mi: Closed/former; Concurrency terminus; Incomplete access
