= Christmas pickle =

Christmas tradition

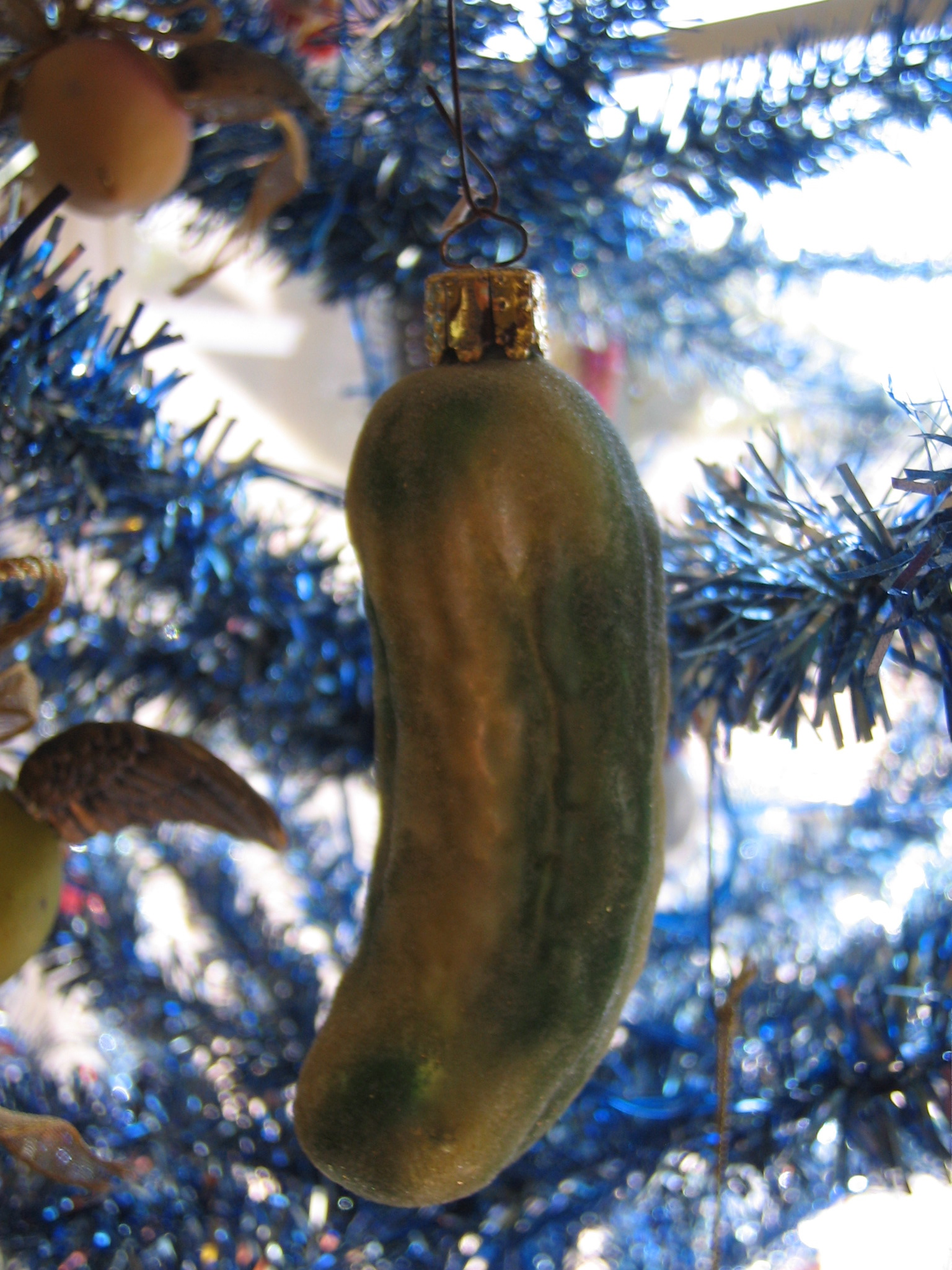
A glass Christmas pickle

The Christmas pickle is a German-American Christmas tradition. A decoration in the shape of a pickle is hidden on a Christmas tree, with the finder receiving either a reward or good fortune for the next year. There are a number of different origin stories attributed to the tradition, including one originating in Germany. This theory has since been discounted, and it is now thought to be a German-American tradition created in the late 19th century. In fact, the New York Times reported that out of 2,057 Germans polled, YouGov determined 91% were unaware of the legend.

== Description ==
In the tradition, an ornamental pickle is placed on a Christmas tree as one of the Christmas decorations. On Christmas morning, the first person to find the pickle on the tree would receive an extra present from Santa Claus or would be said to have a year of good fortune.

Berrien Springs, Michigan, which billed itself as the Christmas pickle capital of the world, held a pickle parade from 1992 until 2005. The Pickle Festival and parade returned in 2021 after a 16-year hiatus.

== Origins ==
This tradition is commonly believed by Americans to come from Germany and be referred to as a Weihnachtsgurke (German for "Christmas pickle"), but this is probably apocryphal. It has been suggested that the origin of the Christmas pickle may have been developed in the 1890s to coincide with the importation of glass Christmas tree decorations from Germany. Woolworths was the first company to import these types of decorations into the United States in 1890, and glass-blown decorative vegetables were imported from France from 1892 onwards. Despite the evidence showing that the tradition did not originate in Germany, the concept of Christmas pickles has since been imported from the United States and they are now on sale in the country traditionally associated with it.

One suggested origin has been that the tradition came from Camp Sumter during the American Civil War. The Bavarian-born Private John C. Lower had enlisted in the 103rd Pennsylvania Infantry, but was captured in April 1864 and taken to the prison camp. As the story is told, on Christmas Eve he begged a guard for a pickle while starving. The guard provided the pickle, which Lower later credited for saving his life. After returning to his family in Bavaria, he began a tradition of hiding a pickle on their Christmas tree each year.

Another origin which comes from Berrien Springs is a Victorian era tale of St. Nicholas saving two Spanish children who were trapped in a barrel of pickles by an innkeeper, which actually derives from a much more gruesome medieval legend involving a cannibalistic butcher butchering and storing a group of boys in a barrel and St. Nicholas miraculously restoring and resurrecting them.
