= Millburg, Michigan =

- Census-designated place (CDP) & unincorporated community
- Location within the state of Michigan Location within the United States
- Coordinates: 42°07′22″N 86°20′30″W
- Country: United States
- State: Michigan
- County: Berrien
- Township: Benton
- Settled: 1834

Area
  - Total: 1.82 sq mi (4.71 km^{2})
  - Land: 1.81 sq mi (4.69 km^{2})
  - Water: 0.0077 sq mi (0.02 km^{2})
- Elevation: 689 ft (210 m)

Population (2020)
  - Total: 578
  - Density: 319.2/sq mi (123.24/km^{2})
- Time zone: UTC-5 (Eastern (EST))
  - Summer (DST): UTC-4 (EDT)
- ZIP code(s): 49022 (Benton Harbor)
- Area code: 269
- GNIS feature ID: 632351, 2806318

Millburg is an unincorporated community and a census-designated place (CDP) in Benton Charter Township near the boundary with Bainbridge Township in Berrien County, Michigan, US. It is situated several miles east of Benton Harbor and just east of the intersection of I-94 and I-196/US 31. It was the site of the first settlement within the township. Settler Jehiel Enos built a saw mill and a grist mill there in 1834 and helped plat the settlement the following year. The community became a CDP in 2019. Per the 2020 Census, the population was 578.

== Demographics ==
Historical population
Census	Pop.	Note	%±
2020	578		—
U.S. Decennial Census; 2020

=== 2020 census ===
Millburg CDP, Michigan - Demographic Profile (NH = Non-Hispanic)
Race / Ethnicity	Pop 2020	% 2020
White alone (NH)	473	81.83%
Black or African American alone (NH)	38	6.57%
Native American or Alaska Native alone (NH)	5	0.87%
Asian alone (NH)	4	0.69%
Pacific Islander alone (NH)	0	0.00%
Some Other Race alone (NH)	1	0.17%
Mixed Race/Multi-Racial (NH)	28	4.84%
Hispanic or Latino (any race)	29	5.02%
Total	578	100.00%

Note: the US Census treats Hispanic/Latino as an ethnic category. This table excludes Latinos from the racial categories and assigns them to a separate category. Hispanics/Latinos can be of any race.
