= Coloma High School =

Location
- 300 West St. Joseph Street; Coloma, Michigan 49038; United States; 42°10′41″N 86°18′49″W

Information
- School type: Public
- Founded: 1931
- School district: Coloma Community Schools
- Superintendent: Dave Ehlers
- Principal: Michael Churchill
- Teaching staff: 19.00 (FTE)
- Grades: 9-12
- Enrollment: 336 (2024–2025)
- Student to teacher ratio: 17.68
- Language: English
- Colors: Forest green and gold
- Mascot: Mark
- Team name: Comets
- Website: chs.coloma.org

Coloma High School is a high school located in Coloma, Michigan. It is a Class B school according to the MHSAA.
