= Royalton Township, Michigan =

- Civil township
- logo
- Motto: "We're growing with great people."
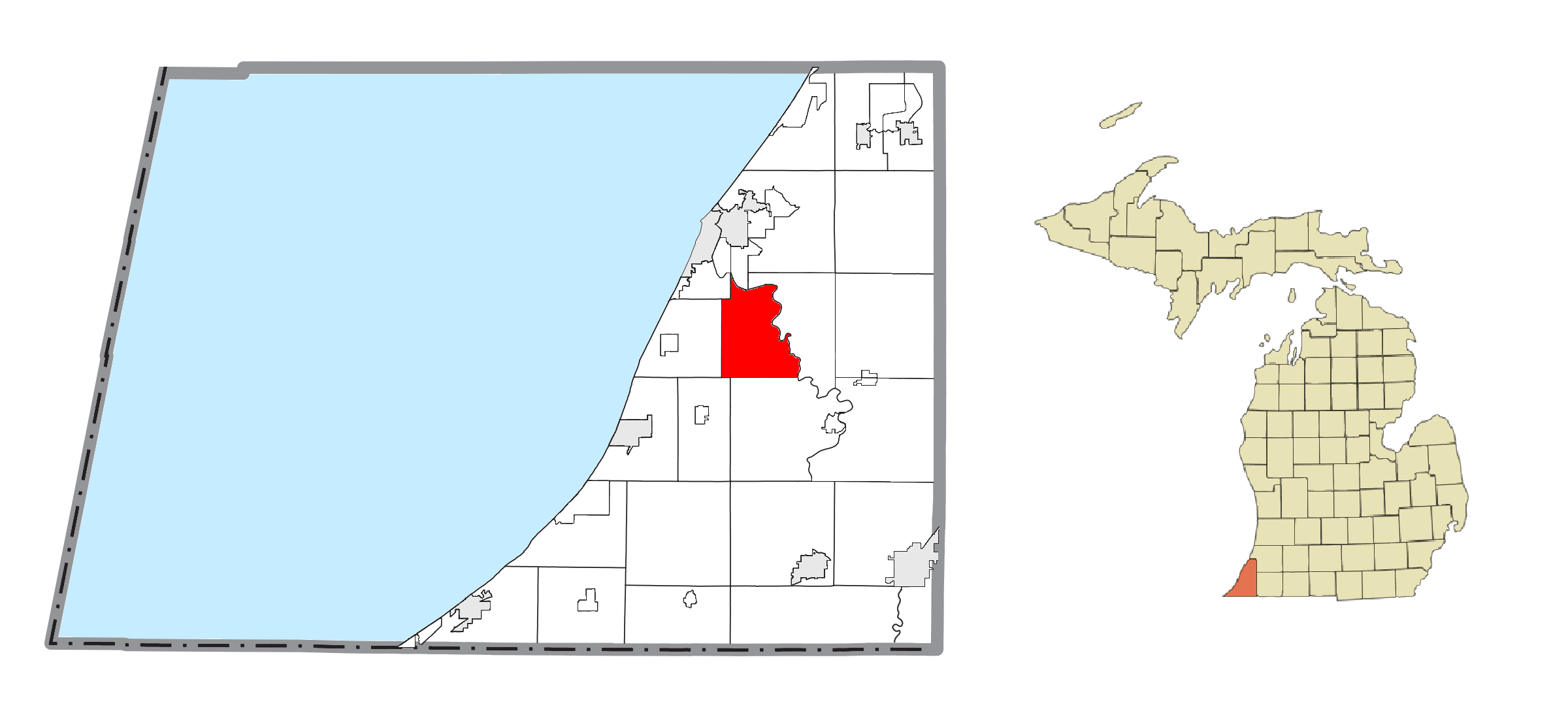
- Location within Berrien County

- Location within the state of Michigan Royalton Township (the United States)
- Coordinates: 42°01′52″N 86°25′52″W
- Country: United States
- State: Michigan
- County: Berrien

Area
  - Total: 18.6 sq mi (48.1 km^{2})
  - Land: 18.1 sq mi (46.9 km^{2})
  - Water: 0.46 sq mi (1.2 km^{2})
- Elevation: 666 ft (203 m)

Population (2020)
  - Total: 5,141
- Time zone: UTC-5 (Eastern (EST))
  - Summer (DST): UTC-4 (EDT)
- ZIP code(s): 49085, 49101, 49103, 49127
- Area code: 269
- FIPS code: 26-70100
- GNIS feature ID: 1627013
- Website: Official website

Royalton Township is a civil township of Berrien County in the U.S. state of Michigan, a few miles southeast of the city of St. Joseph. The population was 5,141 at the 2020 census.

== Communities ==
There are no incorporated municipalities in the township, but portions are considered to be part of the Benton Harbor/St. Joseph urban area. The unincorporated communities of Hollywood, Scottdale, Arden, and Buckhorn are within the township.

== History ==
Royalton Township was organized in 1835 and originally included portions of Lincoln Charter Township, Sodus Township, and St. Joseph Charter Township.

== Geography ==
Lincoln Charter Township lies directly to the west. St. Joseph Charter Township is to the northwest. The St. Joseph River forms the eastern boundary of the township. Sodus Township lies across the river. Oronoko Charter Township lies to the south and Baroda Township to the southwest.

M-139 runs northwest–southeast through the township. Interstate 94 and M-63 are accessible in the northwest of the township.

According to the United States Census Bureau, the township has a total area of 18.6 square miles (48.1 km^{2}), of which 18.1 square miles (46.9 km^{2}) is land and 0.46 square miles (1.2 km^{2}), or 2.49%, is water.

== Demographics ==
Historical population
Census	Pop.	Note	%±
2000	3,888		—
2010	4,766		22.6%
2020	5,141		7.9%

As of the census of 2000, there were 3,888 people, 1,299 households, and 1,084 families residing in the township. The population density was 215.2 inhabitants per square mile (83.1/km^{2}). There were 1,366 housing units at an average density of 75.6 per square mile (29.2/km^{2}). The racial makeup of the township was 93.29% White, 2.03% African American, 0.15% Native American, 2.44% Asian, 1.34% from other races, and 0.75% from two or more races. Hispanic or Latino of any race were 3.42% of the population.

There were 1,299 households, out of which 41.6% had children under the age of 18 living with them, 75.8% were married couples living together, 5.8% had a female householder with no husband present, and 16.5% were non-families. 14.1% of all households were made up of individuals, and 6.3% had someone living alone who was 65 years of age or older. The average household size was 2.86 and the average family size was 3.16.

In the township the population was spread out, with 28.5% under the age of 18, 4.8% from 18 to 24, 26.7% from 25 to 44, 26.1% from 45 to 64, and 13.9% who were 65 years of age or older. The median age was 40 years. For every 100 females, there were 98.8 males. For every 100 females age 18 and over, there were 95.4 males.

The median income for a household in the township was $69,375, and the median income for a family was $76,295. Males had a median income of $50,833 versus $28,750 for females. The per capita income for the township was $26,926. About 7.6% of families and 9.4% of the population were below the poverty line, including 9.4% of those under age 18 and 27.5% of those age 65 or over.
