= Farmers Creek (Michigan) =

Stream in Berrien County, Michigan, U.S.

Coordinates: 41°58′35″N 86°20′13″W

Farmers Creek is a stream in Berrien County, in the U.S. state of Michigan. It is a tributary to the St. Joseph River.

Farmers Creek has the name of William Smythe Farmer, an early settler.
