= Niles Charter Township, Michigan =

- Charter township
- Seal
- Motto: "The Township with a Historical Past"
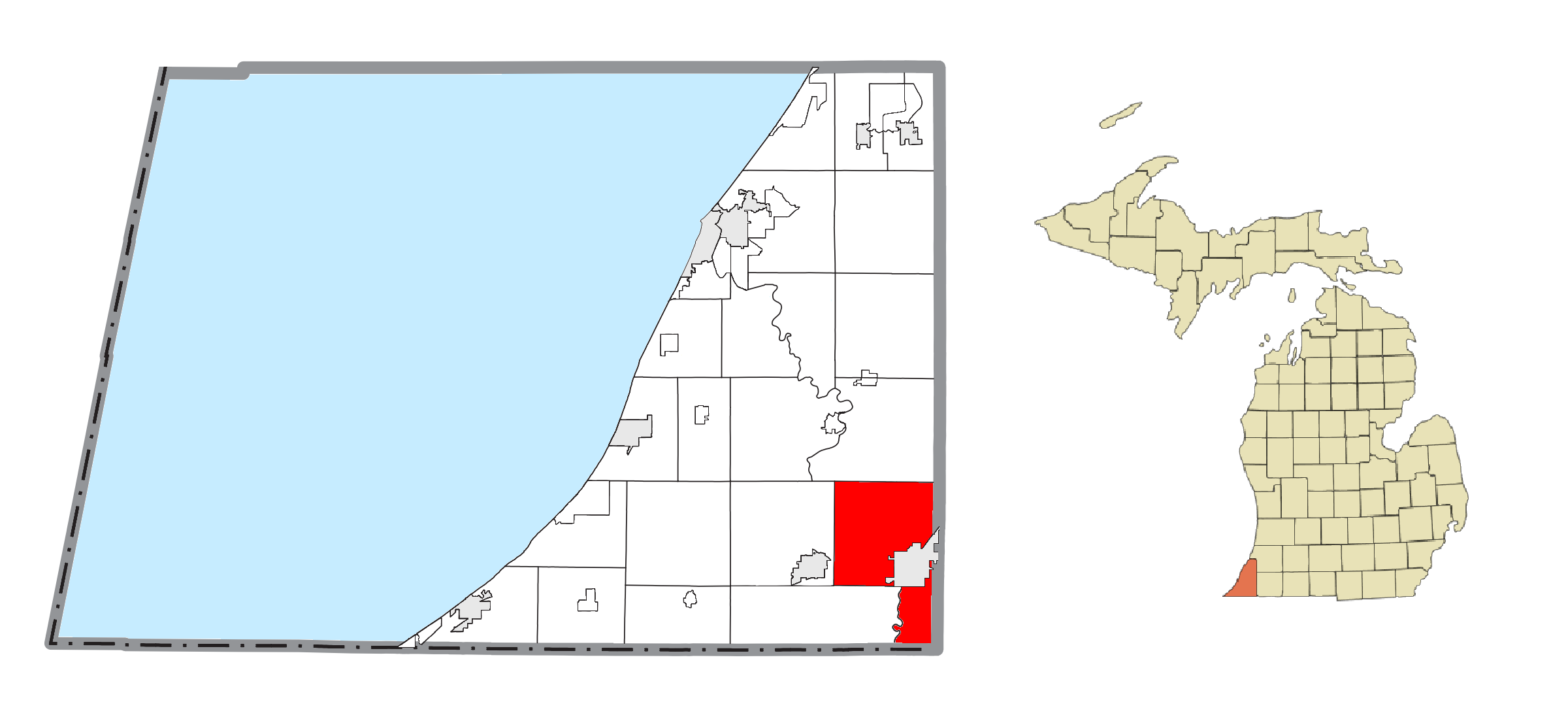
- Location within Berrien County

- Location within the state of Michigan
- Coordinates: 41°49′00″N 86°16′00″W
- Country: United States
- State: Michigan
- County: Berrien

Area
  - Total: 38.4 sq mi (99.4 km^{2})
  - Land: 37.3 sq mi (96.6 km^{2})
  - Water: 1.1 sq mi (2.8 km^{2})
- Elevation: 745 ft (227 m)

Population (2020)
  - Total: 14,417
- Time zone: UTC-5 (Eastern (EST))
  - Summer (DST): UTC-4 (EDT)
- ZIP code(s): 49107, 49120
- Area code: 269
- FIPS code: 26-57780
- GNIS feature ID: 1626807
- Website: Official website

Niles Charter Township is a charter township of Berrien County in the U.S. state of Michigan. The population was 14,417 at the 2020 census.

On June 5, 2006, the township board voted unanimously to approve a resolution for Niles Township to become Niles Charter Township.

== Communities ==
The city of Niles lies mostly within the boundaries of township, but is administratively autonomous. There are no other incorporated municipalities in the township. Much of the township is considered to be part of either the Niles urban area or the South Bend, Indiana, urban area.

Bertrand is an unincorporated community in the southern part of the township.

== Geography ==
The township is irregularly-shaped, with a southern appendage consisting of a small portion of land lying between the St. Joseph River on the west and Cass County on the east and the Indiana state line to the south.

Bertrand Township lies to the west and south, Buchanan Township to the west, and Berrien Township to the north. Neighboring townships in Cass County are Pokagon Township to the northeast, Howard Township to the east, and Milton Township to the southeast. To the south in St. Joseph County, Indiana, is Clay Township, and German Township is to the southwest.

According to the United States Census Bureau, Niles Charter Township has a total area of 38.4 square miles (99.4 km^{2}), of which 37.3 square miles (96.6 km^{2}) is land and 1.1 square miles (2.8 km^{2}), or 2.79%, is water.

== Demographics ==
As of the census of 2000, there were 13,325 people, 5,252 households, and 3,744 families residing in the township. The population density was 353.5 inhabitants per square mile (136.5/km^{2}). There were 5,522 housing units at an average density of 146.5 per square mile (56.6/km^{2}). The racial makeup of the township was 93.30% White, 3.03% African American, 0.56% Native American, 0.50% Asian, 0.02% Pacific Islander, 0.83% from other races, and 1.76% from two or more races. Hispanic or Latino of any race were 1.92% of the population.

There were 5,252 households, out of which 30.4% had children under the age of 18 living with them, 55.5% were married couples living together, 11.6% had a female householder with no husband present, and 28.7% were non-families. 23.3% of all households were made up of individuals, and 10.4% had someone living alone who was 65 years of age or older. The average household size was 2.52 and the average family size was 2.95.

In the township the population was spread out, with 24.8% under the age of 18, 7.8% from 18 to 24, 27.2% from 25 to 44, 24.7% from 45 to 64, and 15.5% who were 65 years of age or older. The median age was 39 years. For every 100 females, there were 95.0 males. For every 100 females age 18 and over, there were 91.8 males.

The median income for a household in the township was $37,794, and the median income for a family was $44,446. Males had a median income of $35,037 versus $22,901 for females. The per capita income for the township was $18,249. About 7.1% of families and 9.0% of the population were below the poverty line, including 9.0% of those under age 18 and 9.8% of those age 65 or over.
