= Berrien Township, Michigan =

- Civil township
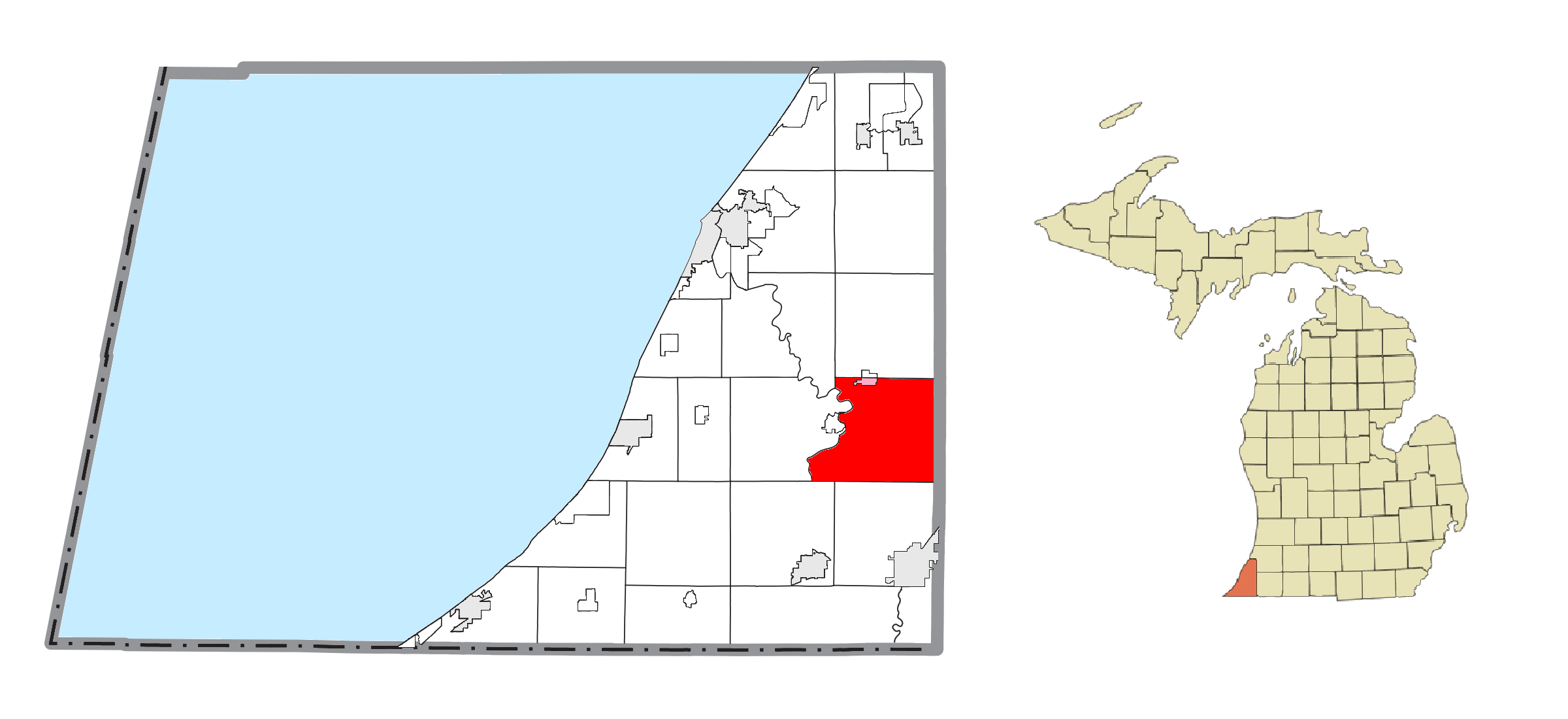
- Location within Berrien County (red) and an administered portion of the Eau Claire village (pink)

- Location within the state of Michigan Berrien Township (the United States)
- Coordinates: 41°56′59″N 86°17′19″W
- Country: United States
- State: Michigan
- County: Berrien
- Settled: 1827
- Established: 1832

Area
  - Total: 36.8 sq mi (95.3 km^{2})
  - Land: 35.1 sq mi (90.8 km^{2})
  - Water: 1.7 sq mi (4.4 km^{2})
- Elevation: 790 ft (240 m)

Population (2020)
  - Total: 4,868
- Time zone: UTC-5 (Eastern (EST))
  - Summer (DST): UTC-4 (EDT)
- ZIP code(s): 49102, 49103, 49111, 49120
- Area code: 269
- FIPS code: 26-07820
- GNIS feature ID: 1625926
- Website: Official website

Berrien Township is a civil township of Berrien County in the U.S. state of Michigan. As of the 2020 census, the township population was 4,868.

Berrien Township was established in 1832, taking its name from Berrien County.

== Communities ==
- Berrien Center is an unincorporated community within the township on M-140 at 41°57′24″N 86°16′36″W, about 10 miles (16 km) north of Niles and just a few miles east of Berrien Springs. It is situated at the corners of sections 9, 10, 15, and 16. A post office with the name Berrien Centre opened April 28, 1857. The name changed to Berrien Center in 1893. The ZIP code for the post office is 49102 and serves the northeast portion of Berrien Township.
- Dickson's Corners was a hamlet in this township at least in the 1870s.
- Fairland was a station on the Chicago and West Michigan Railroad. It had a post office from 1885 until 1906.
- The village of Berrien Springs is adjacent to the township on the west, and the Berrien Springs ZIP code 49103 also serves the southwest portion of Berrien Township.
- The village of Eau Claire is partially within the Berrien Township, and the Eau Claire ZIP code 49111 also serves the northwest portion of the township.
- The city of Niles is to the south, and the Nile ZIP code 49120 also serves the southeast portion of Berrien Township.
- The community of Sodus is to the northwest, and the Sodus ZIP code 49126 also serves a small area in the northwest of Berrien Township.

The township is in the southeast portion of the county. The western boundary with Oronoko Charter Township is the St. Joseph River. Berrien Springs also lies to the west, with a small portion east of the river annexed by the village. Sodus Township lies to the northwest, while Pipestone Township and Eau Claire are to the north. Pokagon Township in Cass County lies to the east. Niles Township and Niles are to the south, and Buchanan Township is to the southwest.

US 31 cuts across the southwest corner of the township. M-140 runs north and south through the center of the township.

== Geography ==
According to the United States Census Bureau, the township has a total area of 36.8 square miles (95.3 km^{2}), of which 35.1 square miles (90.8 km^{2}) is land and 1.7 square miles (4.4 km^{2}), or 4.66%, is water.

== Demographics ==
As of the census of 2000, there were 5,075 people, 1,664 households, and 1,331 families residing in the township. The population density was 143.7 inhabitants per square mile (55.5/km^{2}). There were 1,840 housing units at an average density of 52.1 per square mile (20.1/km^{2}). The racial makeup of the township was 88.00% White, 5.44% African American, 0.67% Native American, 1.71% Asian, 0.06% Pacific Islander, 1.95% from other races, and 2.17% from two or more races. Hispanic or Latino of any race were 6.68% of the population.

There were 1,664 households, out of which 37.0% had children under the age of 18 living with them, 67.2% were married couples living together, 8.5% had a female householder with no husband present, and 20.0% were non-families. 16.0% of all households were made up of individuals, and 5.2% had someone living alone who was 65 years of age or older. The average household size was 2.82 and the average family size was 3.11.

In the township the population was spread out, with 26.9% under the age of 18, 7.6% from 18 to 24, 27.8% from 25 to 44, 24.5% from 45 to 64, and 13.2% who were 65 years of age or older. The median age was 38 years. For every 100 females, there were 102.4 males. For every 100 females age 18 and over, there were 99.6 males.

The median income for a household in the township was $46,293, and the median income for a family was $49,390. Males had a median income of $35,500 versus $25,603 for females. The per capita income for the township was $18,448. About 5.0% of families and 7.9% of the population were below the poverty line, including 5.1% of those under age 18 and 8.1% of those age 65 or over.
