= Sodus Township, Michigan =

- Civil township
- logo

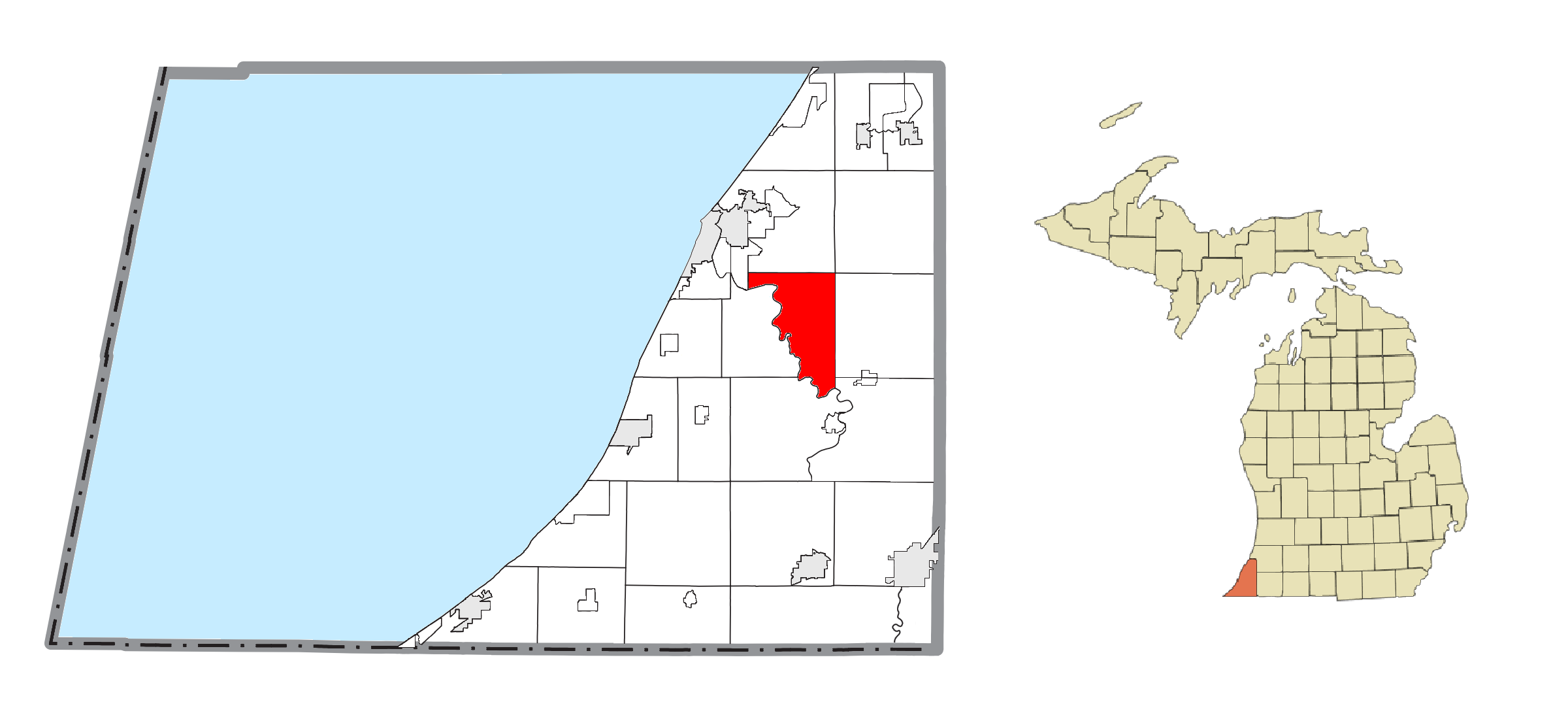
- Location within Berrien County

- Location within the state of Michigan Sodus Township (the United States)
- Coordinates: 42°02′39″N 86°22′54″W
- Country: United States
- State: Michigan
- County: Berrien
- Established: 1859

Area
  - Total: 20.0 sq mi (51.8 km^{2})
  - Land: 19.4 sq mi (50.3 km^{2})
  - Water: 0.58 sq mi (1.5 km^{2})
- Elevation: 682 ft (208 m)

Population (2020)
  - Total: 1,995
- Time zone: UTC-5 (Eastern (EST))
  - Summer (DST): UTC-4 (EDT)
- ZIP code(s): 49126
- Area code: 269
- FIPS code: 26-74440
- GNIS feature ID: 1627087
- Website: Official website

Sodus Township is a civil township of Berrien County in the U.S. state of Michigan. The population was 1,995 at the 2020 census. There are no incorporated municipalities in the township. The unincorporated community of Sodus in the northwest of the township is its main settlement; the portion of the township just to the west is part of the Benton Harbor/St. Joseph urban area.

== History ==
Probably the first entrepreneur in Sodus Township was James LaRue, a New Jersey native, who purchased riverfront land for the construction of a sawmill in 1835. The first permanent settler, however, was David S. Rector who, in 1837, took possession of 40 acres of land. The name of the township came from Rector. He and his brother, William H., came to the area by way of keel boat from Sodus, New York, so the township was named such in 1859 after the town from which they departed.

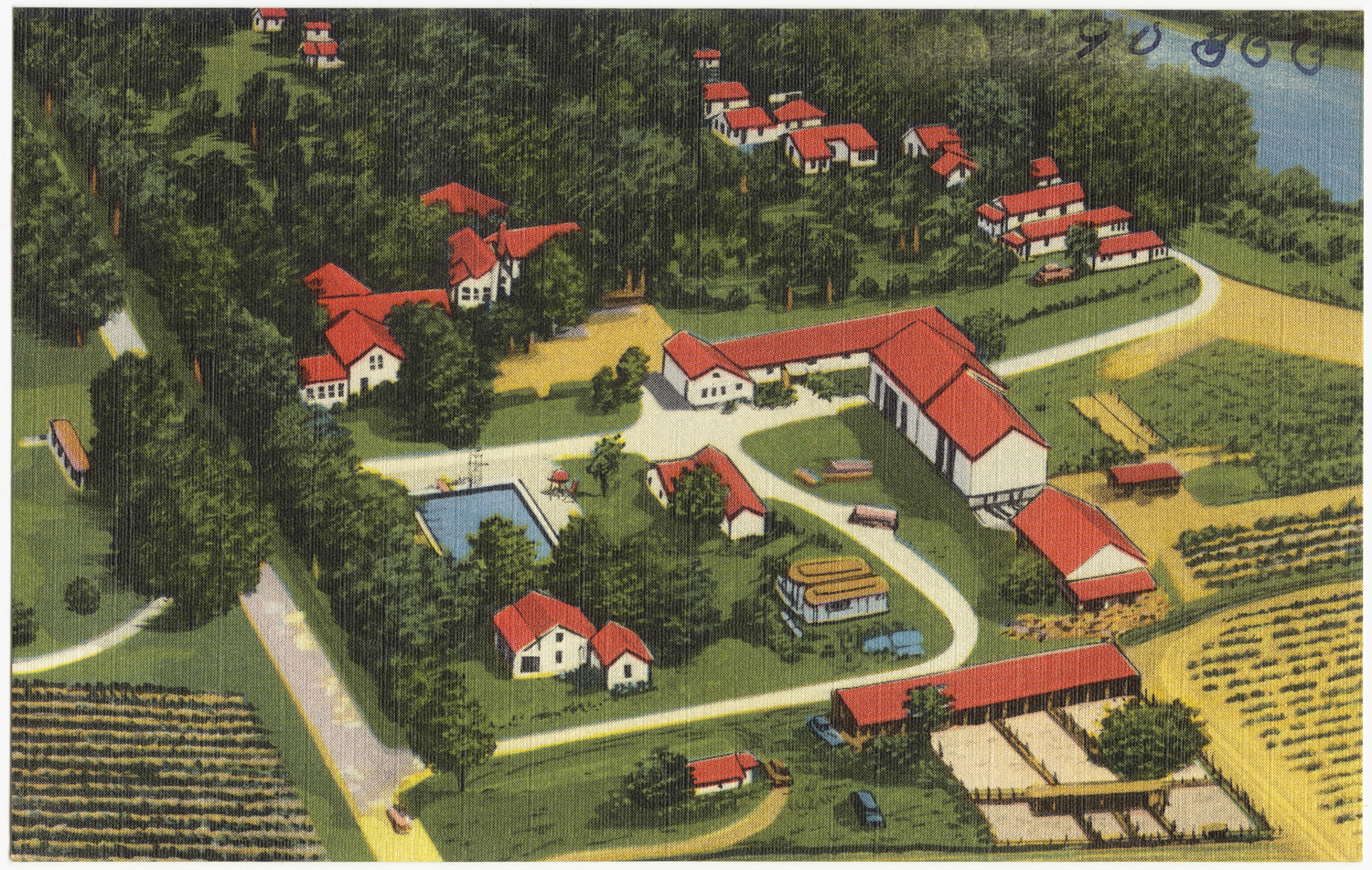
Post card showing the resort at Tabor Farms.

In 1853, Joab Enos built a flour mill, also on Pipestone Creek. The township was organized on October 11, 1859. In 1891, Ernest Tabor established Tabor Farm Summer Resort on the banks of the St. Joseph River. The resort was open during summers and hosted reunions, conventions and banquets. From 1961 to 1983, it was owned and managed by Alma and Valdas Adamkus, future President of Lithuania. The resort was closed in 1990.

Sodus has had retail establishments in the past, though it has none now.

== Geography ==
The St. Joseph River forms most of the western boundary of the township, with Royalton Township on the other side of the river. The township shares a short western border with the community of Fair Plain in Benton Charter Township north of the St. Joseph River. Benton Charter Township continues as the township to the north, Bainbridge Township is to the northeast, Pipestone Township to the east, Berrien Township to the southeast, and Oronoko Charter Township to the south. A new segment of US 31 was completed in August 2003 that re-routed the highway through the township. Interstate 94 crosses the northwest corner of the township with two interchanges located nearby.

According to the United States Census Bureau, the township has a total area of 20.0 square miles (51.8 km^{2}), of which 19.4 square miles (50.3 km^{2}) is land and 0.58 square miles (1.5 km^{2}), or 2.91%, is water.

== Demographics ==
As of the census of 2000, there were 2,139 people, 884 households, and 570 families residing in the township. The population density was 109.5 inhabitants per square mile (42.3/km^{2}). There were 957 housing units at an average density of 49.0 per square mile (18.9/km^{2}). The racial makeup of the township was 87.19% White, 8.37% African American, 0.28% Native American, 0.05% Asian, 0.23% Pacific Islander, 1.26% from other races, and 2.62% from two or more races. Hispanic or Latino of any race were 8.74% of the population.

There were 884 households, out of which 24.5% had children under the age of 18 living with them, 52.0% were married couples living together, 8.7% had a female householder with no husband present, and 35.5% were non-families. 31.7% of all households were made up of individuals, and 14.3% had someone living alone who was 65 years of age or older. The average household size was 2.29 and the average family size was 2.86.

In the township the population was spread out, with 22.5% under the age of 18, 7.6% from 18 to 24, 27.2% from 25 to 44, 25.2% from 45 to 64, and 17.5% who were 65 years of age or older. The median age was 41 years. For every 100 females, there were 102.0 males. For every 100 females age 18 and over, there were 101.3 males.

The median income for a household in the township was $33,804, and the median income for a family was $42,250. Males had a median income of $34,018 versus $22,824 for females. The per capita income for the township was $17,646. About 6.6% of families and 13.6% of the population were below the poverty line, including 12.6% of those under age 18 and 12.3% of those age 65 or over.

== Culture ==
The novel At Home in Old Sodus by Michael Jewell (ISBN 1603832343) is set in Sodus Township.

== Notable people ==
- James Enright, Basketball Hall of Fame referee and former Chicago sportswriter
