= Oronoko Charter Township, Michigan =

- Charter township
- logo

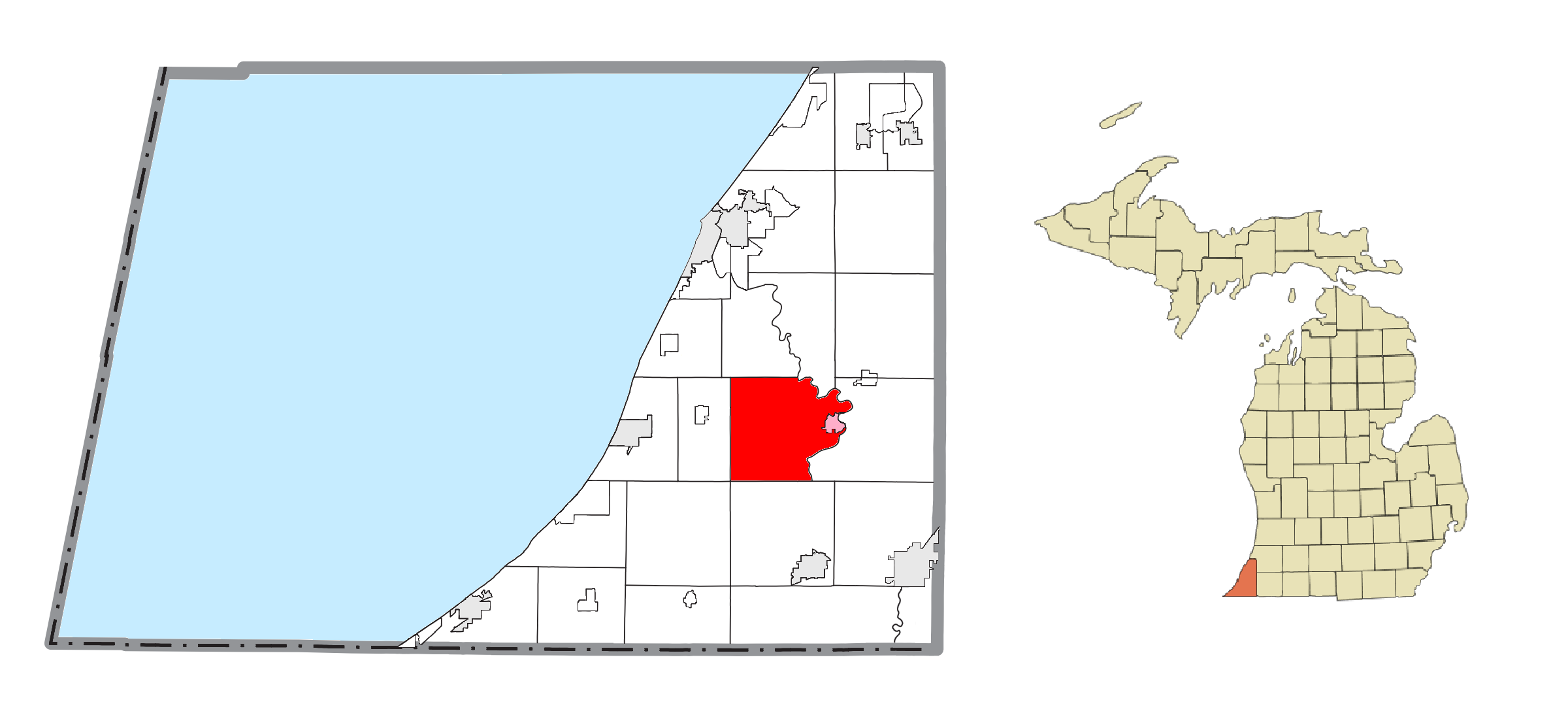
- Location within Berrien County (red) and the administered village of Berrien Springs (pink)

- Location within the state of Michigan
- Coordinates: 41°57′00″N 86°22′00″W
- Country: United States
- State: Michigan
- County: Berrien
- Organized: 1837

Government
  - Supervisor: Mike Hildebrand

Area
  - Total: 33.2 sq mi (86.1 km^{2})
  - Land: 32.3 sq mi (83.7 km^{2})
  - Water: 0.93 sq mi (2.4 km^{2})
- Elevation: 690 ft (210 m)

Population (2020)
  - Total: 9,226
- Time zone: UTC-5 (Eastern (EST))
  - Summer (DST): UTC-4 (EDT)
- ZIP code(s): 49101, 49103, 49104, 49107
- Area code: 269
- FIPS code: 26-61180
- GNIS feature ID: 1626861
- Website: Official website

Oronoko Charter Township is a charter township of Berrien County in the U.S. state of Michigan. The population was 9,226 at the 2020 census.

== Communities ==
The village of Berrien Springs is the only incorporated municipality within the township.

== History ==
The township was organized on March 11, 1837, from a portion of Berrien Township. Part of the area was known as Feather Settlement starting in the 1830s.

Oronoko initially included what is now Lake Township, which was organized in 1846. Originally, portions of both Oronoko and Berrien townships were on either side of the St. Joseph River, and at the time a large portion of the village of Berrien Springs was in Berrien Township, even though it was on the other side of the river from most of the township. In 1847, the river was made the dividing line between the townships.

There are several accounts given for the name of the township. One is that it was named by Governor Stevens T. Mason after the Indian chief named "Oronoko". However, apart from this story, there is no record that there ever was such a chief. Another is that it is a variant spelling of Orinoco, the name of a South American river that was adopted with various spellings in other states besides Michigan: Oronoco, Minnesota, and Oronoque, Kansas. Others believe the township was named after the literary character Oroonoko, which was also derived from the South American river. A final possibility suggested by Vogel is that the name was taken from a variety of tobacco known as oronoco, orinoko, or oronooka.

== Geography ==
The St. Joseph River forms the eastern boundary of the township. Berrien Township lies across the river directly to the east, and Sodus Township is to the north and northeast. Buchanan Township is to the south, Weesaw Township to the southwest, Baroda Township to the west, and Royalton Township to the north.

US 31 passes through the eastern corner of the township.

According to the United States Census Bureau, the township has a total area of 33.2 square miles (86.1 km^{2}), of which 32.3 square miles (83.7 km^{2}) is land and 0.93 square miles (2.4 km^{2}), or 2.77%, is water.

== Demographics ==
As of the census of 2000, there were 9,843 people, 3,295 households, and 2,303 families residing in the township. The population density was 302.5 inhabitants per square mile (116.8/km^{2}). There were 3,545 housing units at an average density of 109.0 per square mile (42.1/km^{2}). The racial makeup of the township was 66.54% White, 17.48% African American, 0.40% Native American, 7.03% Asian, 0.27% Pacific Islander, 4.38% from other races, and 3.89% from two or more races. Hispanic or Latino of any race were 8.53% of the population.

There were 3,295 households, out of which 31.8% had children under the age of 18 living with them, 57.4% were married couples living together, 10.0% had a female householder with no husband present, and 30.1% were non-families. 23.7% of all households were made up of individuals, and 8.5% had someone living alone who was 65 years of age or older. The average household size was 2.62 and the average family size was 3.11.

In the township the population was spread out, with 22.0% under the age of 18, 18.9% from 18 to 24, 26.9% from 25 to 44, 20.3% from 45 to 64, and 11.9% who were 65 years of age or older. The median age was 31 years. For every 100 females, there were 91.8 males. For every 100 females age 18 and over, there were 87.0 males.

The median income for a household in the township was $35,980, and the median income for a family was $45,998. Males had a median income of $36,341 versus $26,330 for females. The per capita income for the township was $16,904. About 9.9% of families and 18.3% of the population were below the poverty line, including 20.4% of those under age 18 and 10.0% of those age 65 or over.

== Education ==
The Seventh-day Adventist Andrews University is located in the township.
