= Fair Plain, Michigan =

- Census-designated place (CDP) & unincorporated community
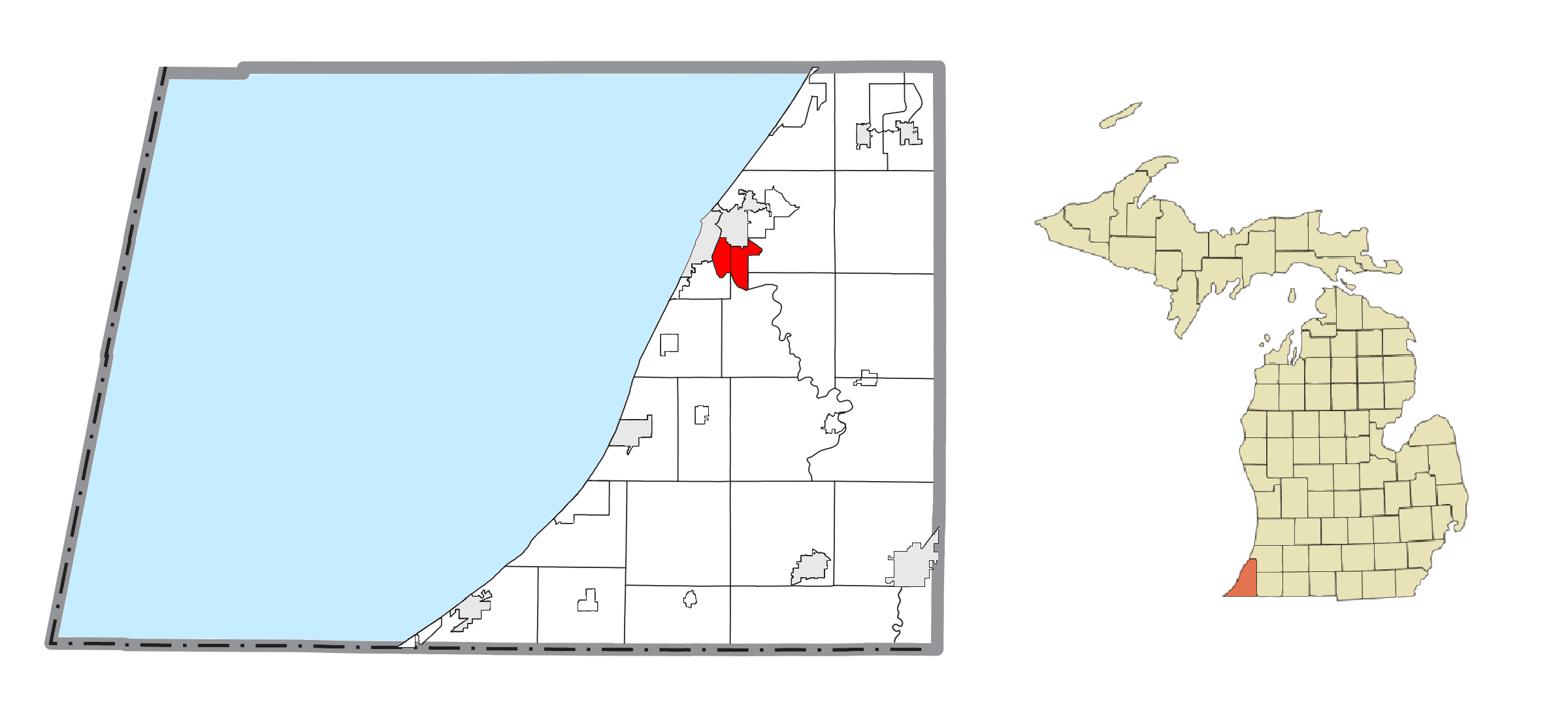
- Location within Berrien County

- Location within the state of Michigan Fair Plain (the United States)
- Coordinates: 42°05′13″N 86°27′21″W
- Country: United States
- State: Michigan
- County: Berrien
- Townships: Benton and St. Joseph

Area
  - Total: 4.54 sq mi (11.75 km^{2})
  - Land: 4.30 sq mi (11.13 km^{2})
  - Water: 0.24 sq mi (0.63 km^{2})
- Elevation: 702 ft (214 m)

Population (2020)
  - Total: 7,402
  - Density: 1,723/sq mi (665.1/km^{2})
- Time zone: UTC-5 (Eastern (EST))
  - Summer (DST): UTC-4 (EDT)
- ZIP code(s): 49022
- Area code: 269
- FIPS code: 26-27160
- GNIS feature ID: 625742

Fair Plain (also "Fairplain" ) is an unincorporated community in Berrien County in the U.S. state of Michigan. It is a census-designated place (CDP) for statistical purposes and has no legal status as a municipality. The population was 7,402 at the 2020 census.

== History ==
The community was named for the scenic character of the original town site.

Fairplain Plaza, located on M-139 on the east edge of Fair Plain, was the first shopping center in the area, opening in 1958. The original Fairplain Plaza was largely demolished by the late 1990s, but was subsequently rebuilt and expanded using different architecture techniques.

There was a failed proposal to incorporate Fair Plain as a city in 1975.

== Geography ==
According to the United States Census Bureau, the CDP has a total area of 4.4 square miles (11.5 km^{2}), of which 4.2 square miles (10.9 km^{2}) is land and 0.23 square miles (0.6 km^{2}), or 5.22%, is water.

The Fair Plain CDP consists of the portion of St. Joseph Charter Township lying northeast of the St. Joseph River and a portion of Benton Charter Township. The CDP's boundaries are the city of Benton Harbor to the north, the St. Joseph River to the west and south, and M-139 to the east.

== Demographics ==
Historical population
| Census | Pop. | Note | %± |
|---|---|---|---|
| 2000 | 7,828 | | — |
| 2010 | 7,631 | | −2.5% |
| 2020 | 7,402 | | −3.0% |
U.S. Decennial Census

=== Racial and ethnic composition ===
Fair Plain CDP, Michigan – Racial and ethnic composition Note: the US Census treats Hispanic/Latino as an ethnic category. This table excludes Latinos from the racial categories and assigns them to a separate category. Hispanics/Latinos may be of any race.
| Race / Ethnicity (NH = Non-Hispanic) | Pop 2000 | Pop 2010 | Pop 2020 | % 2000 | % 2010 | % 2020 |
|---|---|---|---|---|---|---|
| White alone (NH) | 3,771 | 3,194 | 3,186 | 48.17% | 41.86% | 43.04% |
| Black or African American alone (NH) | 3,705 | 3,924 | 3,279 | 47.33% | 51.42% | 44.30% |
| Native American or Alaska Native alone (NH) | 34 | 23 | 32 | 0.43% | 0.30% | 0.43% |
| Asian alone (NH) | 52 | 64 | 69 | 0.66% | 0.84% | 0.93% |
| Native Hawaiian or Pacific Islander alone (NH) | 5 | 0 | 5 | 0.06% | 0.00% | 0.07% |
| Other race alone (NH) | 23 | 6 | 49 | 0.29% | 0.08% | 0.66% |
| Mixed race or Multiracial (NH) | 107 | 171 | 374 | 1.37% | 2.24% | 5.05% |
| Hispanic or Latino (any race) | 131 | 249 | 408 | 1.67% | 3.26% | 5.51% |
| Total | 7,828 | 7,631 | 7,402 | 100.00% | 100.00% | 100.00% |

=== 2020 census ===
As of the 2020 census, Fair Plain had a population of 7,402. The median age was 44.4 years. 18.6% of residents were under the age of 18 and 20.3% were 65 years of age or older. For every 100 females, there were 94.3 males, and for every 100 females age 18 and over, there were 92.2 males age 18 and over.

100.0% of residents lived in urban areas, while 0.0% lived in rural areas.

There were 3,281 households, of which 22.9% had children under the age of 18 living in them. Of all households, 35.4% were married-couple households, 21.9% were households with a male householder and no spouse or partner present, and 35.7% were households with a female householder and no spouse or partner present. About 36.5% of all households were made up of individuals, and 15.4% had someone living alone who was 65 years of age or older.

There were 3,563 housing units, of which 7.9% were vacant. The homeowner vacancy rate was 1.6%, and the rental vacancy rate was 8.9%.

=== 2000 census ===
As of the 2000 census, there were 7,828 people, 3,287 households, and 2,116 families residing in the CDP. The population density was 1,860.2 inhabitants per square mile (718.2/km^{2}). There were 3,436 housing units at an average density of 816.5 per square mile (315.3/km^{2}). The racial makeup of the CDP was 49.08% White, 47.42% Black or African American, 0.46% Native American, 0.66% Asian, 0.06% Pacific Islander, 0.88% from other races, and 1.43% from two or more races. Hispanic or Latino of any race were 1.67% of the population.

There were 3,287 households, out of which 27.1% had children under the age of 18 living with them, 43.2% were married couples living together, 17.3% had a female householder with no husband present, and 35.6% were non-families. 29.7% of all households were made up of individuals, and 10.0% had someone living alone who was 65 years of age or older. The average household size was 2.37 and the average family size was 2.91.

In the CDP, the population was spread out, with 24.5% under the age of 18, 7.7% from 18 to 24, 29.5% from 25 to 44, 24.3% from 45 to 64, and 14.0% who were 65 years of age or older. The median age was 38 years. For every 100 females, there were 91.9 males. For every 100 females age 18 and over, there were 86.7 males.

The median income for a household in the CDP was $37,154, and the median income for a family was $45,950. Males had a median income of $34,524 versus $24,043 for females. The per capita income for the CDP was $20,344. About 10.8% of families and 16.0% of the population were below the poverty line, including 30.5% of those under age 18 and 5.6% of those age 65 or over.
