= Berrien County, Michigan =

County in Michigan, United States

- County
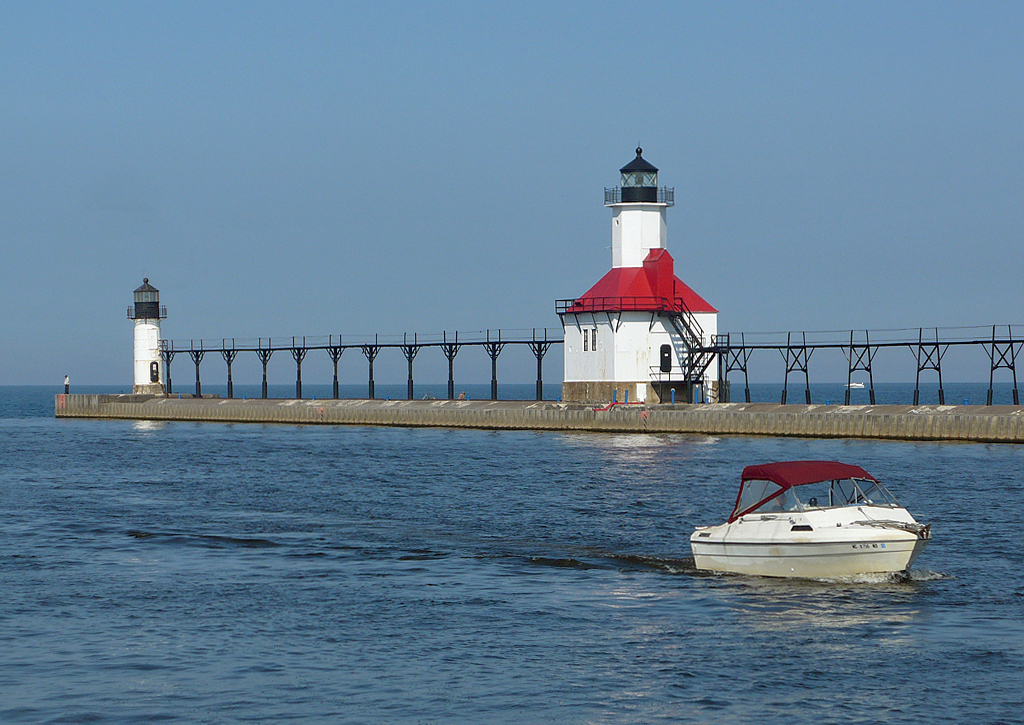
- Lighthouse at St. Joseph

- Seal

- Location within the U.S. state of Michigan
- Coordinates: 41°56′N 86°35′W
- Country: United States
- State: Michigan
- Created: October 29, 1829
- Organized: 1831
- Named for: John M. Berrien
- Seat: St. Joseph
- Largest city: Niles

Area
  - Total: 1,581 sq mi (4,090 km^{2})
  - Land: 568 sq mi (1,470 km^{2})
  - Water: 1,014 sq mi (2,630 km^{2}) 64%

Population (2020)
  - Total: 154,316
  - Estimate (2025): 152,444 ▼
  - Density: 272/sq mi (105/km^{2})
- Time zone: UTC−5 (Eastern)
  - Summer (DST): UTC−4 (EDT)
- Congressional districts: 4th, 5th
- Website: www.berriencounty.org

Berrien County is a county in the U.S. state of Michigan. It is located at the southwest corner of the state's Lower Peninsula, located on the shore of Lake Michigan and sharing a land border with Indiana. As of the 2020 Census, the population was 154,316. The county seat is St. Joseph. Berrien County is included in the Niles-Benton Harbor, MI Metropolitan Statistical Area, which is also included in the South Bend-Elkhart-Mishawaka, IN-MI Combined Statistical Area. The county is part of the Michiana region.

== History ==
As one of the Cabinet counties, Berrien County was named for John M. Berrien of Georgia, US Attorney General (1829–1831) under US President Andrew Jackson. The county was founded in 1829, and was organized in 1831, before Michigan was accepted into the Union as a state.

When Michigan Territory was established in 1805, the area of present Berrien County was included in the boundary of Wayne County.

About 1780, New Jersey resident William Burnett established a trading post at the mouth of the St. Joseph River (present-day site of St. Joseph) to serve indigenous peoples and French Canadian residents. Also during that time, Joseph Bertrand established a trading post on the river, in present–day Niles Charter Township. In December 1822, missionary Isaac McCoy moved his family and 18 Indian students from Indiana to the St. Joseph River near present-day Niles, Michigan, to open a religious mission (the Carey Mission) to the Potawatomi Indians, 160 km from the nearest White settlement.

In 1827 St. Joseph Township was organized as part of Wayne County, It included all lands acquired from the Native Americans by the 1821 Treaty of Chicago.

The boundary of Berrien County was delineated by the Michigan Territory Legislature on October 29, 1829, with its present limits. For purposes of revenue, taxation and judicial matters, it was attached to Cass County, and was designated as Niles Township. This assignation was terminated in 1831 when Berrien County's government was organized and initiated.

Berrien County began with three townships:

- Berrien Township – consisted of present-day townships of Berrien, Oronoko, Baroda and Lake plus a two-mile strip north of that territory
- St. Joseph Township – consisted of the area north of Berrien Township
- Niles Township – consisted of the area south of Berrien Township.

In recent times, Berrien County, especially the coastal cities of New Buffalo and Lakeside, has received notice as a vacation destination for Chicago area residents and other Midwesterners. It has earned multiple nicknames in this capacity, including "Harbor Country" and "the Hamptons of the Midwest", with the latter recognized by The Wall Street Journal.

== Politics ==
Berrien County has favored a Republican Party candidate in all but five elections since 1884.

United States presidential election results for Berrien County, Michigan
Year	Republican		Democratic		Third party(ies)	
Year	No.	%	No.	%	No.	%
1884	4,445	48.06%	4,458	48.21%	345	3.73%
1888	5,128	49.72%	4,689	45.46%	497	4.82%
1892	4,979	48.55%	4,716	45.98%	561	5.47%
1896	6,672	56.12%	4,792	40.31%	424	3.57%
1900	6,595	55.47%	4,960	41.72%	334	2.81%
1904	7,309	62.99%	3,819	32.91%	476	4.10%
1908	7,260	58.07%	4,598	36.78%	645	5.16%
1912	2,752	23.06%	4,225	35.40%	4,958	41.54%
1916	7,511	53.68%	6,054	43.27%	426	3.04%
1920	15,748	74.06%	4,855	22.83%	662	3.11%
1924	15,612	63.73%	4,445	18.15%	4,440	18.12%
1928	19,064	68.60%	8,555	30.78%	172	0.62%
1932	14,123	42.46%	18,447	55.46%	694	2.09%
1936	15,321	41.27%	20,822	56.09%	982	2.65%
1940	22,778	57.02%	16,961	42.46%	208	0.52%
1944	24,832	60.66%	15,886	38.81%	216	0.53%
1948	22,003	58.89%	14,516	38.85%	842	2.25%
1952	32,932	62.94%	19,088	36.48%	300	0.57%
1956	35,397	65.50%	18,454	34.15%	194	0.36%
1960	37,425	60.85%	23,837	38.76%	244	0.40%
1964	26,387	43.86%	33,653	55.94%	122	0.20%
1968	32,136	51.08%	21,266	33.80%	9,514	15.12%
1972	43,047	68.26%	18,597	29.49%	1,416	2.25%
1976	40,835	61.13%	25,163	37.67%	800	1.20%
1980	41,458	60.99%	22,152	32.59%	4,368	6.43%
1984	43,160	66.58%	21,228	32.75%	436	0.67%
1988	37,799	62.81%	21,948	36.47%	436	0.72%
1992	29,252	42.02%	25,840	37.12%	14,523	20.86%
1996	28,254	47.65%	24,614	41.51%	6,427	10.84%
2000	35,689	54.70%	28,152	43.15%	1,400	2.15%
2004	41,076	55.01%	32,846	43.99%	749	1.00%
2008	36,130	46.42%	40,381	51.88%	1,323	1.70%
2012	38,209	52.51%	33,465	45.99%	1,088	1.50%
2016	38,647	53.65%	29,495	40.95%	3,889	5.40%
2020	43,519	52.71%	37,438	45.34%	1,608	1.95%
2024	44,975	53.23%	38,323	45.36%	1,190	1.41%

United States Senate election results for Berrien County, Michigan1
Year	Republican		Democratic		Third party(ies)	
Year	No.	%	No.	%	No.	%
2024	44,819	53.89%	35,983	43.27%	2,358	2.84%

Michigan Gubernatorial election results for Berrien County
Year	Republican		Democratic		Third party(ies)	
Year	No.	%	No.	%	No.	%
2022	33,157	51.79%	29,803	46.55%	1064	1.66%

== Government ==
The county government operates the jail, maintains rural roads, operates the major local courts, records deeds, mortgages and vital records, oversees public health, and participates with the state in welfare and social services. The county board of commissioners controls the budget and has limited authority to make laws and ordinances. In Michigan, most local government functions — police, fire, building and zoning, tax assessment, street maintenance, etc. — are the responsibility of individual cities and townships.

=== Elected officials ===
- Prosecuting Attorney: Amy Byrd
- Sheriff: Chuck Heit
- County Clerk: Stacy Loar-Porter
- County Treasurer: Shelly Weich
- Register of Deeds: Lora Freehling
- Drain Commissioner: Christopher J. Quattrin
- County Surveyor: John G. Kamer
- 1st District County Commissioner: David Vollrath (R-Coloma)
- 2nd District County Commissioner: Jon Hinkelman (R-Watervliet)
- 3rd District County Commissioner: Chokwe Pitchford (D-Benton Harbor)
- 4th District County Commissioner: Mamie Yarbrough (D-Benton Harbor)
- 5th District County Commissioner: Rayonte Bell (D-St. Joseph)
- 6th District County Commissioner: Julie Wuerfel (R-St. Joseph)
- 7th District County Commissioner: Bob Harrison (R-Stevensville)
- 8th District County Commissioner: Teri Freehling (R-Baroda)
- 9th District County Commissioner: Alex Ott (R-Sawyer)
- 10th District County Commissioner: Mac Elliot (R-Buchanan)
- 11th District County Commissioner: Jim Curran (R-Niles)
- 12th District County Commissioner: Michael Majerek (R-Niles)

(information as of March 2024)

== Geography ==
According to the US Census Bureau, the county has a total area of 1,581 square miles (4,090 km^{2}), of which 568 square miles (1,470 km^{2}) is land and 1,014 square miles (2,630 km^{2}) (64%) is water.

The county borders the state of Indiana to the South and includes a portion of Lake Michigan to the West.

The St. Joseph River is a major geographical feature, flowing mostly north and west through the county from Niles to its mouth on Lake Michigan at St. Joseph. Farmers Creek is a tributary to St. Joseph River in the county. The southwest of the county is drained by the Galien River and its tributaries. Paw Paw Lake is in the north of the county, along with the Paw Paw River, which flows into the St. Joseph River just before it enters Lake Michigan. A tiny portion along the Indiana state line is drained by small tributaries of the Kankakee River, which ultimately flows into the Mississippi River. This is one of two areas of Michigan drained by the Mississippi River, the other being an area of Michigan's Upper Peninsula near the Wisconsin border.

=== Major highways ===
- I-94 – runs north along the western edge of the county near Lake Michigan. Turns inland to skirt the St. Joseph/Benton Harbor urban area. Runs east to Kalamazoo. Business Loop 94 passes through downtown Benton Harbor and St. Joseph.
- BL I-94 – runs through St. Joseph and Benton Harbor.
- I-196 – from its intersection with I-94 east of Benton Harbor, runs north to Holland, then east to Grand Rapids.
- US 12 – runs east–west through the southern portion of the county from south of Niles through Three Oaks to New Buffalo and Michiana, Michigan. From Berrien County it connects with Michigan City, Indiana.
- US 31 – running north from South Bend, Indiana, enters the southeast county as the St. Joseph Valley Parkway, near Niles, and joins I-94 then I-196 before leaving the county.
- M-51 – enters from Indiana as a continuation of State Road 933. Runs north through Niles, then northeast toward Dowagiac, Michigan.
- M-60 – runs east from Niles to I-94 at Jackson.
- M-62 – from its intersection with M-140, runs east toward Dowagiac, Michigan.
- M-63 – from its intersection with M-139 (formerly US 31) in Scottdale, runs northwest into St. Joseph, then northeast to intersection with US 31/I-196 near the county line.
- M-139 – from its intersection with US 12 southwest of Niles, runs northeasterly into downtown Niles, then follows the former route of US 31/US 33 northwesterly through Berrien Springs to Scottdale, then north near St. Joseph and Benton Harbor to an intersection with Business Loop I-94.
- M-140 – from Niles, runs north through the eastern part of the county toward South Haven, Michigan.
- M-239 – its 1.1 miles (1.8 km) length links I-94 at Exit 1 near New Buffalo to State Road 39 north of LaPorte, Indiana.
- A-2 – Berrien County's only signed county highway. Begins in Hagar Shores at M-63 and I-196. It follows the Lake Michigan shoreline and continues to South Haven, Michigan.

=== Adjacent counties ===
By land

- Van Buren County – north and northeast
- Cass County – east
- St. Joseph County, Indiana – southeast
- LaPorte County, Indiana – south

By water

- Porter County, Indiana – southwest
- Cook County, Illinois – west
- Lake County, Illinois – northwest

== Demographics ==
Historical population
Census	Pop.	Note	%±
1830	325		—
1840	5,011		1,441.8%
1850	11,417		127.8%
1860	22,378		96.0%
1870	35,104		56.9%
1880	36,785		4.8%
1890	41,285		12.2%
1900	49,165		19.1%
1910	53,622		9.1%
1920	62,653		16.8%
1930	81,066		29.4%
1940	89,117		9.9%
1950	115,702		29.8%
1960	149,865		29.5%
1970	163,875		9.3%
1980	171,276		4.5%
1990	161,378		−5.8%
2000	162,453		0.7%
2010	156,813		−3.5%
2020	154,316		−1.6%
2025 (est.)	152,444	▼	−1.2%
US Decennial Census; 1790-1960 1900-1990; 1990-2000 2010-2019

=== Racial and ethnic composition ===
Berrien County, Michigan – Racial and ethnic composition Note: the US Census treats Hispanic/Latino as an ethnic category. This table excludes Latinos from the racial categories and assigns them to a separate category. Hispanics/Latinos may be of any race.
Race / Ethnicity (NH = Non-Hispanic)	Pop 1980	Pop 1990	Pop 2000	Pop 2010	Pop 2020	% 1980	% 1990	% 2000	% 2010	% 2020
White alone (NH)	142,821	131,798	126,798	119,389	111,603	83.39%	81.67%	78.05%	76.13%	72.32%
Black or African American alone (NH)	24,594	24,688	25,729	23,766	21,199	14.36%	15.30%	15.84%	15.16%	13.74%
Native American or Alaska Native alone (NH)	593	651	647	765	740	0.35%	0.40%	0.40%	0.49%	0.48%
Asian alone (NH)	822	1,432	1,839	2,410	3,159	0.48%	0.89%	1.13%	1.54%	2.05%
Native Hawaiian or Pacific Islander alone (NH)	x	x	65	115	109	x	x	0.04%	0.07%	0.07%
Other race alone (NH)	358	126	230	152	668	0.21%	0.08%	0.14%	0.10%	0.43%
Mixed race or Multiracial (NH)	x	x	2,257	3,162	7,628	x	x	1.39%	2.02%	4.94%
Hispanic or Latino (any race)	2,088	2,683	4,888	7,054	9,210	1.22%	1.66%	3.01%	4.50%	5.97%
Total	171,276	161,378	162,453	156,813	154,316	100.00%	100.00%	100.00%	100.00%	100.00%

=== 2020 census ===
As of the 2020 census, the county had a population of 154,316. The median age was 43.0 years. 21.5% of residents were under the age of 18 and 20.9% of residents were 65 years of age or older. For every 100 females there were 94.8 males, and for every 100 females age 18 and over there were 92.6 males age 18 and over.

The racial makeup of the county was 73.6% White, 13.9% Black or African American, 0.6% American Indian and Alaska Native, 2.1% Asian, 0.1% Native Hawaiian and Pacific Islander, 2.8% from some other race, and 7.0% from two or more races. Hispanic or Latino residents of any race comprised 6.0% of the population.

69.9% of residents lived in urban areas, while 30.1% lived in rural areas.

There were 63,955 households in the county, of which 26.5% had children under the age of 18 living in them. Of all households, 45.2% were married-couple households, 19.1% were households with a male householder and no spouse or partner present, and 28.8% were households with a female householder and no spouse or partner present. About 30.8% of all households were made up of individuals and 13.9% had someone living alone who was 65 years of age or older.

There were 76,821 housing units, of which 16.7% were vacant. Among occupied housing units, 71.3% were owner-occupied and 28.7% were renter-occupied. The homeowner vacancy rate was 1.4% and the rental vacancy rate was 8.9%.

=== 2010 census ===
The 2010 United States census indicates Berrien County had a 2010 population of 156,813. This is a decrease of 5,640 people from the 2000 United States census, or a 3.5% population decrease. In 2010 there were 63,054 households and 41,585 families in the county. The population density was 276.2 per square mile (106.6 square kilometers). There were 76,922 housing units at an average density of 135.5 per square mile (52.3 square kilometers). 78.3% of the population were White, 15.3% Black or African American, 1.6% Asian, 0.5% Native American, 0.1% Pacific Islander, 1.8% of some other race and 2.4% of two or more races. 4.5% were Hispanic or Latino (of any race). 29.0% were of German, 7.4% Irish, 6.8% English and 5.5% American ancestry.

There were 63,054 households, 29.6% of which had children under the age of 18 living with them, 47.8% were husband and wife families, 13.6% had a female householder with no husband present, 34.0% were non-families, and 28.7% were made up of individuals. The average household size was 2.43 and the average family size was 2.98.

The county population contained 23.4% under age of 18, 8.5% from 18 to 24, 23.2% from 25 to 44, 28.6% from 45 to 64, and 16.3% who were 65 years of age or older. The median age was 41 years. For every 100 females there were 94.9 males. For every 100 females age 18 and over, there were 91.6 males.

The 2010 American Community Survey 1-year estimate indicates the median income for a household in the county was $40,329 and the median income for a family was $51,305. Males had a median income of $26,745 versus $16,289 for females. The per capita income for the county was $22,337. About 12.1% of families and 16.8% of the population were below the poverty line, including 28.5% of those under the age 18 and 8.3% of those age 65 or over.

== Recreation ==
=== State parks ===
- Grand Mere State Park
- Warren Dunes State Park
- Warren Woods State Park

=== County parks ===
- Galien River County Park Preserve
- Love Creek County Park
- Madeline Bertrand County Park
- Paw Paw River County Park
- Rocky Gap County Park
- Silver Beach County Park

=== Other parks ===
- Expo Arena – at Berrien County Fairgrounds
- Kiwanis Park – St. Joseph
- Riverview Park – St. Joseph

=== Resorts and beaches ===
- Hagar Park – Hagar Township
- Jean Klock Park - Benton Harbor
- Lion's Park Beach – St. Joseph
- New Buffalo Beach Park – New Buffalo
- Paw Paw Lake
- Rocky Gap Beach Park - Benton Harbor
- Silver Beach - St. Joseph
- Tiscornia Park
- Weko Beach - Bridgman

=== Golf courses ===
- The Golf Club at Harbor Shores - Benton Harbor
- Blossom Trails Golf Club – Benton Harbor
- Brookwood Golf Course - Buchanan
- Lake Michigan Hills Golf Club - Benton Harbor
- Lost Dunes Golf Club - Bridgman
- Milan Creek Golf Club - Baroda
- Orchard Hills Country Club - Buchanan
- Paw Paw Lake Golf Club - Coloma/Watervliet
- Pebblewood Country Club - Bridgman
- Pipestone Creek Golf Course - Eau Claire
- Point O'Woods Golf & Country Club - Benton Harbor

== Communities ==
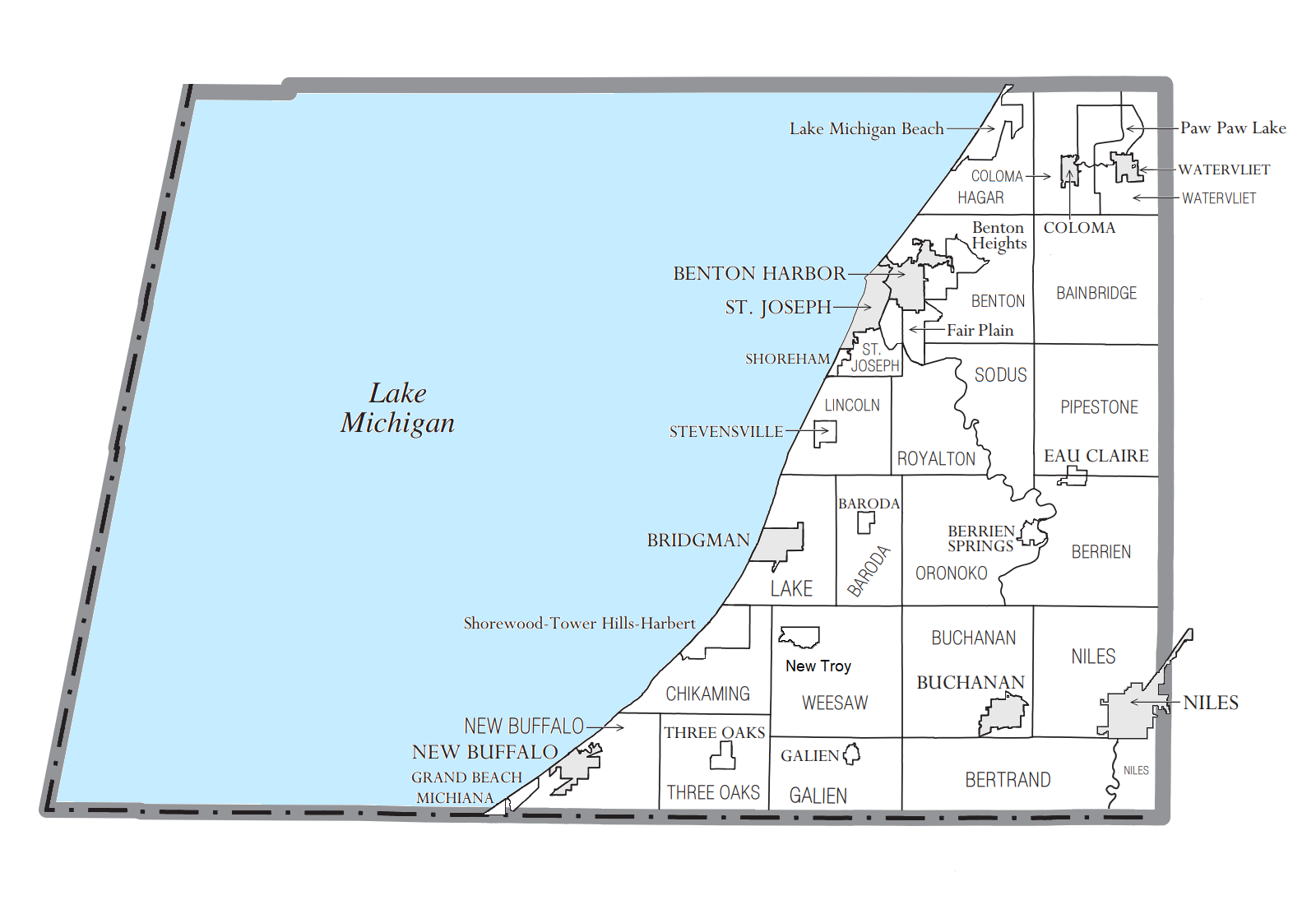
U.S. Census data map showing local municipal boundaries within Berrien County, as well as CDP boundaries. Shaded areas represent incorporated cities.

=== Cities ===
- Benton Harbor
- Bridgman
- Buchanan
- Coloma
- New Buffalo
- Niles
- St. Joseph (county seat)
- Watervliet

=== Villages ===
- Baroda
- Berrien Springs
- Eau Claire
- Galien
- Grand Beach
- Michiana
- Shoreham
- Stevensville
- Three Oaks

=== Charter townships ===
- Benton Charter Township
- Bertrand Charter Township
- Buchanan Charter Township
- Coloma Charter Township
- Lake Charter Township
- Lincoln Charter Township
- Niles Charter Township
- Oronoko Charter Township
- St. Joseph Charter Township
- Watervliet Charter Township

=== Civil townships ===
- Bainbridge Township
- Baroda Township
- Berrien Township
- Chikaming Township
- Galien Township
- Hagar Township
- New Buffalo Township
- Pipestone Township
- Royalton Township
- Sodus Township
- Three Oaks Township
- Weesaw Township

=== Census-designated places ===
- Benton Heights
- Fair Plain
- Lake Michigan Beach
- Millburg
- New Troy
- Paw Paw Lake
- Shorewood-Tower Hills-Harbert

=== Other unincorporated communities ===
- Berrien Center
- Bethany Beach
- Birchwood
- Dayton
- Glendora
- Harbert
- Hazelhurst
- Hinchman
- Lakeside
- Millburg
- Riverside
- Sawyer
- Scottdale
- Shorewood Hills
- Tower Hill Shorelands
- Union Pier

=== Indian reservation ===
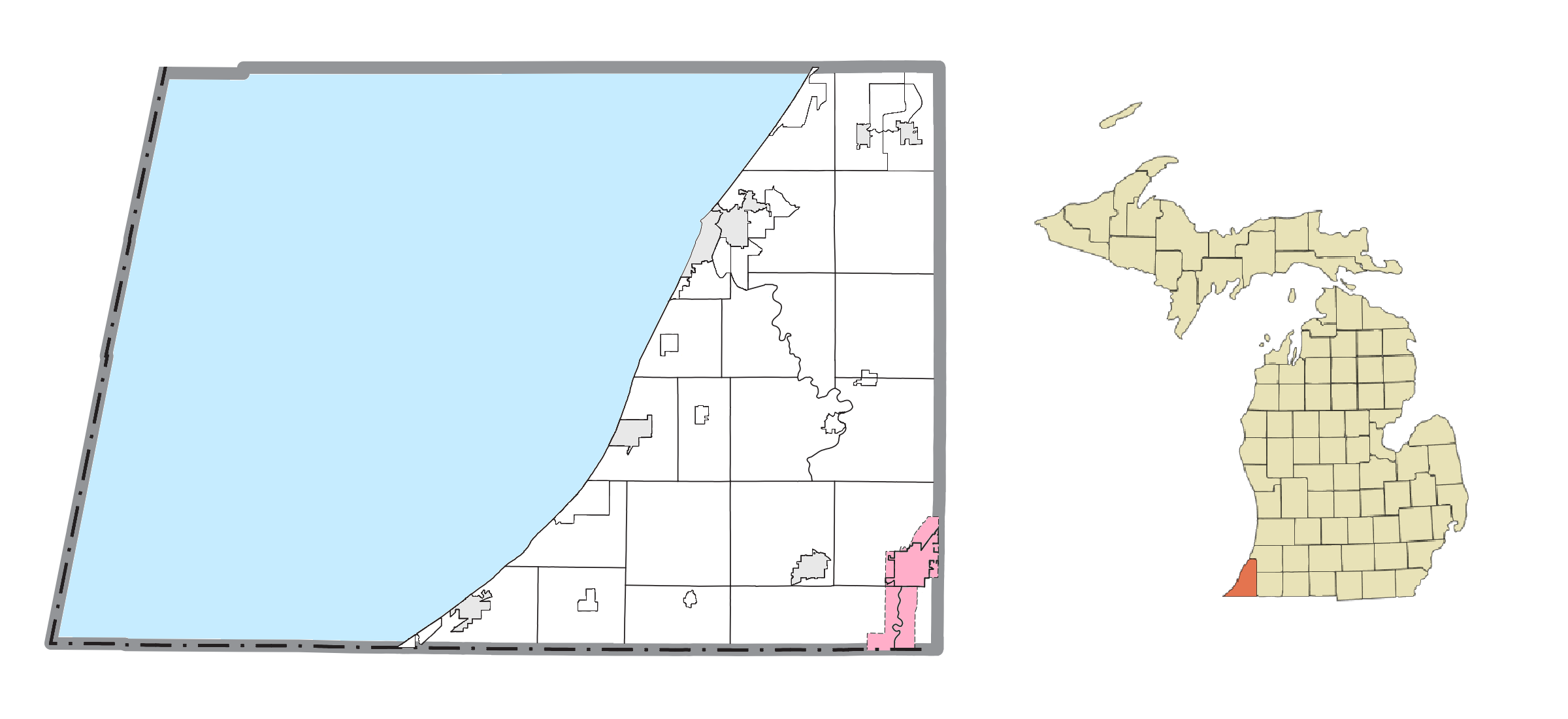
The Pokagon reservation with underlying local municipal boundaries

- The Pokagon Band of Potawatomi Indians has a reservation occupying a portion of the southeastern corner of Berrien County. The tribe also occupies areas in Allegan, Cass, and Van Buren counties, as well as extending south into the state of Indiana. The reservation headquarters are located in neighboring Cass County in the city of Dowagiac. The Berrien County reservation surrounds the entire portion of the city of Niles that lies within the county, as well as portions of Bertrand Township and Niles Charter Township along the St. Joseph River.

== See also ==
- List of Michigan State Historic Sites in Berrien County
- National Register of Historic Places listings in Berrien County, Michigan
- People from Berrien County, Michigan
