= Bainbridge Township, Michigan =

- Civil township
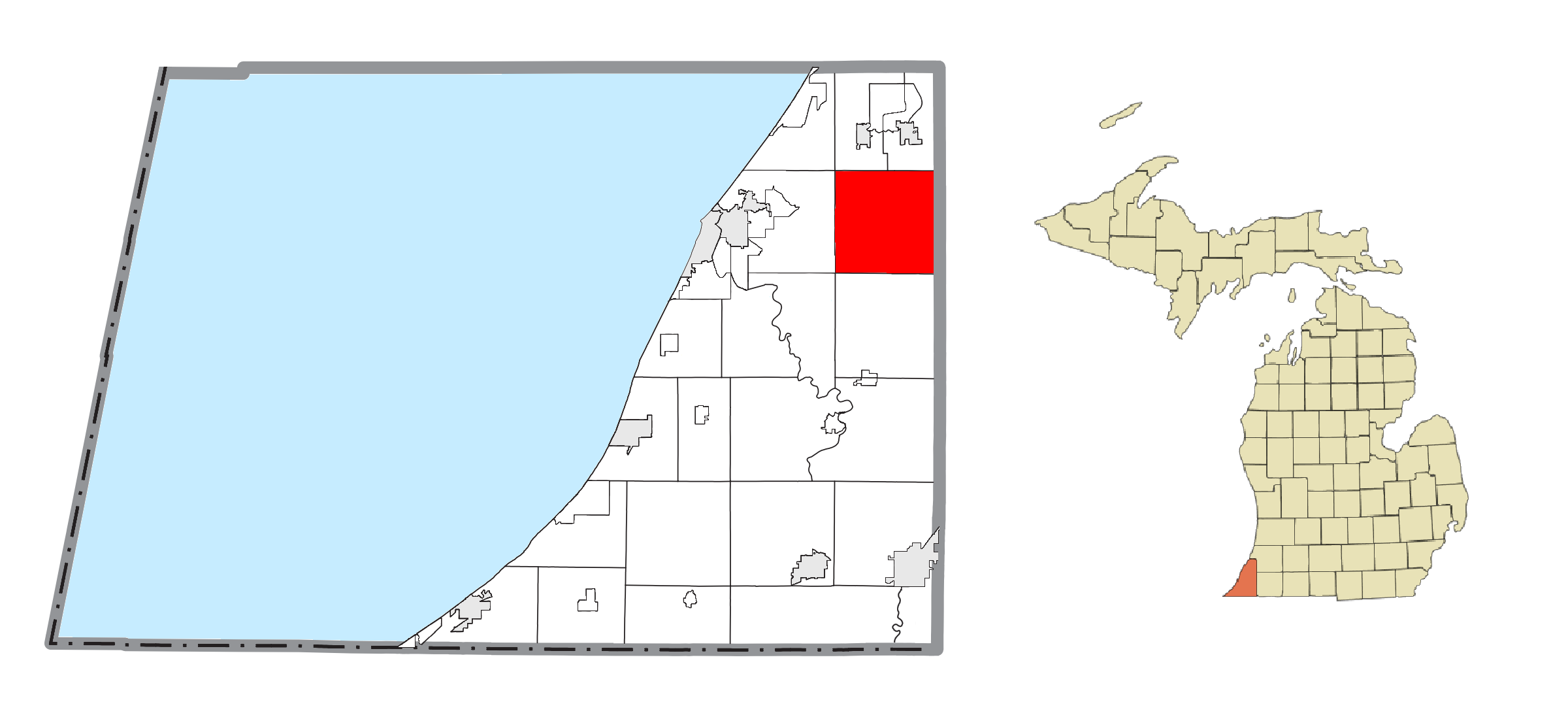
- Location within Berrien County

- Location within the state of Michigan Bainbridge Township (the United States)
- Coordinates: 42°06′31″N 86°17′28″W
- Country: United States
- State: Michigan
- County: Berrien
- Settled: 1833
- Established: 1837

Area
  - Total: 35.4 sq mi (91.6 km^{2})
  - Land: 34.9 sq mi (90.4 km^{2})
  - Water: 0.46 sq mi (1.2 km^{2})
- Elevation: 725 ft (221 m)

Population (2020)
  - Total: 2,682
- Time zone: UTC-5 (Eastern (EST))
  - Summer (DST): UTC-4 (EDT)
- ZIP code(s): 49022, 49038, 49098, 49111
- Area code: 269
- FIPS code: 26-04840
- GNIS feature ID: 1625874
- Website: Official website

Bainbridge Township is a civil township of Berrien County in the U.S. state of Michigan. As of the 2020 census, the township population was 2,682. It was organized in 1837. The name is a transfer from Bainbridge, New York.

== Communities ==
Unincorporated communities located within the township include Spinks Corners and Millburg.

== Geography ==
According to the United States Census Bureau, the township has a total area of 35.4 square miles (91.6 km^{2}), of which 34.9 square miles (90.4 km^{2}) is land and 0.46 square miles (1.2 km^{2}), or 1.27%, is water.

The township is in the northeast portion of the county, with Benton Charter Township to the west, Hagar Township to the northwest, and Coloma Charter Township and Watervliet Charter Township to the north. East of the township is Keeler Township in Van Buren County. Pipestone Township is to the south, and Sodus Township to the southwest.

M-140 passes north and south through the township, and Interstate 94 nips the northwest corner of the township.

== Demographics ==
As of the census of 2000, there were 3,132 people, 1,142 households, and 832 families residing in the township. The population density was 89.1 inhabitants per square mile (34.4/km^{2}). There were 1,295 housing units at an average density of 36.8 per square mile (14.2/km^{2}). The racial makeup of the township was 95.47% White, 0.57% African American, 0.67% Native American, 0.10% Asian, 0.10% Pacific Islander, 1.92% from other races, and 1.18% from two or more races. Hispanic or Latino of any race were 12.90% of the population.

There were 1,142 households, out of which 26.9% had children under the age of 18 living with them, 62.2% were married couples living together, 7.0% had a female householder with no husband present, and 27.1% were non-families. 22.6% of all households were made up of individuals, and 9.0% had someone living alone who was 65 years of age or older. The average household size was 2.56 and the average family size was 2.96.

In the township the population was spread out, with 24.4% under the age of 18, 7.5% from 18 to 24, 26.9% from 25 to 44, 27.6% from 45 to 64, and 13.6% who were 65 years of age or older. The median age was 39 years. For every 100 females, there were 105.9 males. For every 100 females age 18 and over, there were 105.6 males.

The median income for a household in the township was $38,750, and the median income for a family was $46,250. Males had a median income of $32,991 versus $26,290 for females. The per capita income for the township was $17,854. About 7.4% of families and 12.5% of the population were below the poverty line, including 16.9% of those under age 18 and 8.1% of those age 65 or over.
