= Berrien Springs, Michigan =

- Village
- Seal

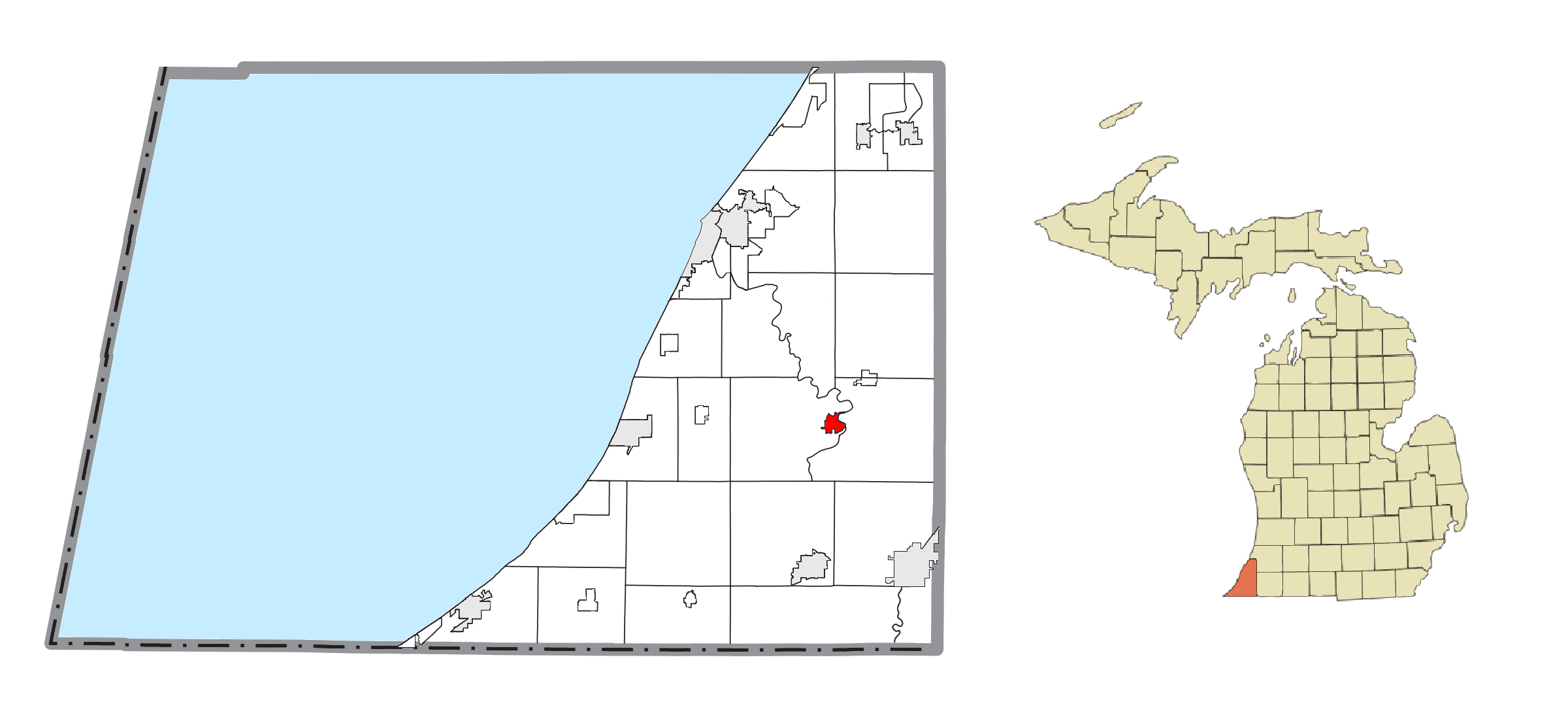
- Location within Berrien County

- Location within the state of Michigan
- Coordinates: 41°56′51″N 86°20′25″W
- Country: United States
- State: Michigan
- County: Berrien
- Township: Oronoko

Area
  - Total: 1.00 sq mi (2.59 km^{2})
  - Land: 0.92 sq mi (2.38 km^{2})
  - Water: 0.081 sq mi (0.21 km^{2})
- Elevation: 673 ft (205 m)

Population (2020)
  - Total: 1,910
  - Density: 2,080.9/sq mi (803.43/km^{2})
- Time zone: UTC-5 (Eastern (EST))
  - Summer (DST): UTC-4 (EDT)
- ZIP code(s): 49103, 49104
- Area code: 269
- FIPS code: 26-07860
- GNIS feature ID: 2398105
- Website: www.villageofberriensprings.com

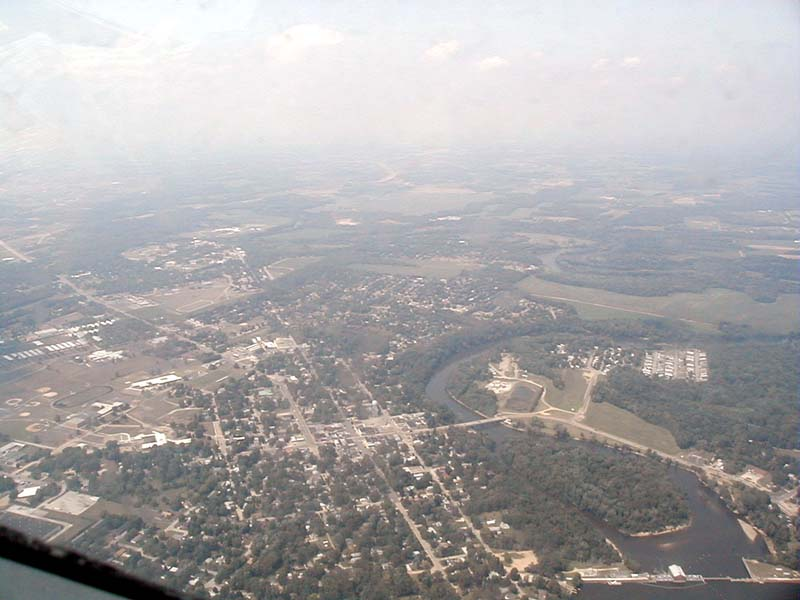
Aerial view of Berrien Springs

Berrien Springs is a village in Berrien County in the U.S. state of Michigan. The population was 1,910 at the time of the 2020 census. The village is located within Oronoko Charter Township and is the home of Andrews University.

== History ==
Berrien Springs, like Berrien County, is named for John M. Berrien. "Springs" was added after mineral springs were discovered in the area.

The village is the site of the earliest European-American settlement in Oronoko Township. It was first known as "Wolf's Prairie" in reference to the 1,000-acre prairie in which it was situated. The site had been a village under the leadership of a Potawatomi chief named Wolf.

The first permanent settlers (according to European-American terms), John Pike and his family, did not arrive until 1829.

Francis B. Murdoch was a co-founder of the village and the first lawyer in the county. (His surname was spelled as 'Murdock' in some records.) In 1831 he built a two-story log house, which is the oldest surviving example of its kind in Michigan. In 1973 this house was moved near courthouse square, to be part of that historic complex.

Murdoch was known in the Antebellum period for representing enslaved African Americans in freedom suits, in which they tried to gain freedom. Michigan was established as a free territory and later state. It went by the principle of "once free, always free". If slaveholders brought enslaved people to the state, the latter were judged to be free.

The village of Berrien was platted in 1831. The Berrien Springs post office opened with the name "Berrien" on December 4, 1832; this was changed to Berrien Springs on April 18, 1836.

Berrien Springs served as the county seat from 1837 until 1894, when St. Joseph was designated as the county seat after the cities of St. Joseph and Benton Harbor combined votes to unseat Berrien Springs.

=== 1839 courthouse ===
Berrien Springs courthouse, designed by local architect Gilbert B. Avery, was completed in 1839, making it the oldest courthouse in the state. The Greek Revival-style courthouse emulated the architecture of ancient Greece with its large columns, triangular pediment and white paint. After the county seat was moved in 1894, the building was put to various uses and briefly was vacant. In 1967, efforts to preserve and restore the courthouse were started. Such restoration was completed by 1975.

The restored courthouse square also features the Midwest's most complete surviving mid-nineteenth century county government complex. Today the square houses a county museum and archives. The courthouse serves as headquarters for the Berrien County Historical Association. Its original buildings are listed on the National Register of Historic Places. The property is dedicated to the preservation of Berrien County's history and does this through permanent and temporary exhibits, programs, events, and community outreach.

=== Christmas pickle capital of the world ===
Berrien Springs was once known as the Christmas pickle capital of the world. A festival was established by the Berrien Springs-Eau Claire Chamber of Commerce, the Berrien County Historical Association (BCHA), and the village. They featured parades, games, activities, and a Pickle Prince and Princess contest. The event ran until the mid-2000s. In 2021, the Pickle Festival was revived by the Village, the BCHA, and the Berrien Springs Community Library.

== Geography ==
According to the United States Census Bureau, the village has a total area of 1.02 square miles (2.64 km^{2}), of which 0.94 square miles (2.43 km^{2}) is land and 0.08 square miles (0.21 km^{2}) is water. The village is situated on the St. Joseph River.

== Demographics ==
Historical population
Census	Pop.	Note	%±
1870	662		—
1880	758		14.5%
1890	745		−1.7%
1900	808		8.5%
1910	880		8.9%
1920	918		4.3%
1930	1,413		53.9%
1940	1,510		6.9%
1950	1,761		16.6%
1960	1,953		10.9%
1970	1,951		−0.1%
1980	2,042		4.7%
1990	1,927		−5.6%
2000	1,862		−3.4%
2010	1,800		−3.3%
2020	1,910		6.1%
U.S. Decennial Census

=== 2020 census ===
As of the 2020 census, Berrien Springs had a population of 1,910. The median age was 35.2 years. 23.8% of residents were under the age of 18 and 15.8% of residents were 65 years of age or older. For every 100 females there were 92.5 males, and for every 100 females age 18 and over there were 88.2 males age 18 and over.

99.0% of residents lived in urban areas, while 1.0% lived in rural areas.

There were 783 households in Berrien Springs, of which 28.9% had children under the age of 18 living in them. Of all households, 39.7% were married-couple households, 21.2% were households with a male householder and no spouse or partner present, and 34.2% were households with a female householder and no spouse or partner present. About 32.7% of all households were made up of individuals and 10.4% had someone living alone who was 65 years of age or older.

There were 855 housing units, of which 8.4% were vacant. The homeowner vacancy rate was 2.3% and the rental vacancy rate was 5.9%.

Racial composition as of the 2020 census
Race	Number	Percent
White	1,145	59.9%
Black or African American	228	11.9%
American Indian and Alaska Native	19	1.0%
Asian	125	6.5%
Native Hawaiian and Other Pacific Islander	17	0.9%
Some other race	119	6.2%
Two or more races	257	13.5%
Hispanic or Latino (of any race)	283	14.8%

=== 2010 census ===
As of the census of 2010, there were 1,800 people, 756 households, and 463 families living in the village. The population density was 1,914.9 inhabitants per square mile (739.3/km^{2}). There were 837 housing units at an average density of 890.4 per square mile (343.8/km^{2}). The racial makeup of the village was 72.7% White, 12.9% African American, 0.4% Native American, 5.1% Asian, 0.4% Pacific Islander, 3.8% from other races, and 4.7% from two or more races. Hispanic or Latino people of any race were 12.9% of the population.

There were 756 households, of which 30.2% had children under the age of 18 living with them, 40.9% were married couples living together, 16.0% had a female householder with no husband present, 4.4% had a male householder with no wife present, and 38.8% were non-families. 32.0% of all households were made up of individuals, and 11.2% had someone living alone who was 65 years of age or older. The average household size was 2.35 and the average family size was 2.95.

The median age in the village was 34.6 years. 22.8% of residents were under the age of 18; 13.1% were between the ages of 18 and 24; 27.2% were from 25 to 44; 23.3% were from 45 to 64; and 13.7% were 65 years of age or older. The gender makeup of the village was 47.9% male and 52.1% female.

=== 2000 census ===
As of the census of 2000, there were 1,862 people, 732 households, and 475 families living in the village. The population density was 2,059.6 inhabitants per square mile (795.2/km^{2}). There were 787 housing units at an average density of 870.5 per square mile (336.1/km^{2}). The racial makeup of the village was 77.12% White, 11.06% African American, 0.43% Native American, 4.03% Asian, 0.16% Pacific Islander, 4.30% from other races, and 2.90% from two or more races. Hispanic or Latino people of any race were 8.92% of the population.

There were 732 households, out of which 30.2% had children under the age of 18 living with them, 49.2% were married couples living together, 11.6% had a female householder with no husband present, and 35.0% were non-families. 29.8% of all households were made up of individuals, and 10.7% had someone living alone who was 65 years of age or older. The average household size was 2.46 and the average family size was 3.05.

In the village, 23.0% of the population was under the age of 18, 11.9% was from 18 to 24, 28.7% from 25 to 44, 21.0% from 45 to 64, and 15.3% was 65 years of age or older. The median age was 36 years. For every 100 females, there were 95.0 males. For every 100 females age 18 and over, there were 88.1 males.

The median income for a household in the village was $32,396, and the median income for a family was $41,250. Males had a median income of $31,467 versus $21,750 for females. The per capita income for the village was $16,093. About 12.4% of families and 17.5% of the population were below the poverty line, including 25.4% of those under age 18 and 4.1% of those age 65 or over.

== Schools ==
=== Elementary ===
- Mars Elementary – public, grades K-2
- Sylvester Elementary – public, grades 3–5
- Berrien Springs Middle School – public, grades 6–8
- Trinity Lutheran School – private, religious (Lutheran), grades preK – 8
- Ruth Murdoch Elementary – private, religious (Seventh-day Adventist), grades K-8
- Village SDA Elementary – private, religious (Seventh-day Adventist), grades K-8

=== Secondary ===
- Andrews Academy – private, religious (Seventh-day Adventist), grades 9–12
- Berrien Springs High School – public, grades 9–12; team name: Shamrocks; team colors: green and white
- Blossomland Learning Center, run by Berrien County RESA – preschool through age 26

=== Post-secondary ===
- Andrews University is located outside of town, but still in Oronoko Charter Township. It is served by the Berrien Springs post office.

== Notable people ==
- Muhammad Ali, professional boxer, considered among the greatest heavyweights in the sport's history; owned a home in the Berrien Springs area
- Francis B. Murdoch, attorney and co-founder of Berrien Springs
- Regan Upshaw, defensive lineman for five NFL teams; born in Berrien Springs (1975)
