= Michigan's 39th House of Representatives district =

American legislative district

Michigan's 39th State House of Representatives district
Representative
Pauline Wendzel; R–Watervliet
- Demographics: 79.7% White; 2% Black; 12.3% Hispanic; 0.4% Asian; 0.4% Native American; 0.6% Other; 4.7% Multiracial
- Population (2024): 90,921

Michigan's 39th House of Representatives district is a legislative district within the Michigan House of Representatives located in the counties of Allegan, Berrien, and Van Buren. The district was created in 1965, when the Michigan Supreme Court ordered the reapportionment of state legislative districts from a county-based system to a proportional one following the Supreme Court case Reynolds v. Sims. It is currently represented by Republican Pauline Wendzel of Watervliet.

== List of representatives ==
Representative	Party	Years	Residence	Notes
Raymond C. Kehres	Democratic	1965–1980	Monroe	
Patrick L. Harrington	Democratic	1981–1982	Monroe	
Jerry Carl Bartnik	Democratic	1983–1992	Temperance	
Barbara Jeane Dobb	Republican	1993–1998	Commerce Township	Redistricted from the 24th district; term limited.
Marc Shulman	Republican	1999–2004	West Bloomfield	Term limited.
David Law	Republican	2005–2008	West Bloomfield	
Lisa S. Brown	Democratic	2009–2012	West Bloomfield	
Klint Kesto	Republican	2013–2018	Commerce Township	Term limited.
Ryan Berman	Republican	2019–2022	Commerce Township	
Pauline Wendzel	Republican	2023–present	Watervliet	Redistricted from the 79th district.

== Historical district boundaries ==
Map	Description	Apportionment Plan	Notes
	Monroe County (part): Bedford Township; Erie Township; Frenchtown Township; La Salle Township; Luna Pier; Monroe; Monroe Township; Whiteford Township	1964 Apportionment Plan	
	Monroe County (part): Bedford Township; Berlin Township; Erie Township; Frenchtown Township (part); La Salle Township; Luna Pier; Monroe; Monroe Township	1972 Apportionment Plan	
	Monroe County (part): Berlin Township; Bedford Township; Erie Township; Frenchtown Township (part); Ida Township; La Salle Township; Luna Pier; Monroe; Monroe Township	1982 Apportionment Plan	
	Oakland County (part): Commerce Township; Orchard Lake Village; West Bloomfield Township; Keego Harbor	1992 Apportionment Plan	
	Oakland County (part): Commerce Township; West Bloomfield Township (part)	2001 Apportionment Plan	
	Oakland County (part): Commerce Township; Wixom; West Bloomfield Township (Part)	2011 Apportionment Plan	
	Allegan County (part): Cheshire Township; Lee Township; Otsego Township (part); Trowbridge Township; Berrien County (part): Bainbridge Township; Coloma; Coloma Charter Township; Watervliet; Watervliet Township; Van Buren County (part): Almena Township; Antwerp Township; Arlington Township; Bangor; Bangor Township; Bloomingdale Township; Columbia Township; Decatur Township; Geneva Township; Gobles; Hamilton Township; Hartford; Hartford Township; Keeler Township; Lawrence Township; Paw Paw Township; Pine Grove Township; Porter Township; Waverly Township	2021 Apportionment Plan (Note: Referred to as the Hickory plan.)	

== Recent elections ==
=== 2020s ===
2026 Michigan House of Representatives election
Party	Candidate	Votes	%
Republican	Pauline Wendzel (incumbent)	22,390	57.02
Democratic	Kerry Tapper	16,222	41.31
Green	Jared Polonowski	655	1.67
Total votes		39,267	100
Republican hold			

2024 Michigan House of Representatives election
Party	Candidate	Votes	%
Republican	Pauline Wendzel (incumbent)	29,906	63.09
Democratic	Kerry Tapper	17,498	36.91
Total votes		47,404	100
Republican hold			

2022 Michigan House of Representatives election
Party	Candidate	Votes	%
Republican	Pauline Wendzel	22,797	62.71
Democratic	Jared Polonowski	13,556	37.29
Total votes		36,353	100
Republican hold			

2020 Michigan House of Representatives election
Party	Candidate	Votes	%
Republican	Ryan Berman (incumbent)	30,754	51.91
Democratic	Julia Pulver	27,561	46.52
Libertarian	Anthony Croff	927	1.56
Total votes		59,242	100
Republican hold			

=== 2010s ===
2018 Michigan House of Representatives election
Party	Candidate	Votes	%
Republican	Ryan Berman	23,173	54.2
Democratic	Jennifer Suidan	18,093	42.3
Libertarian	Anthony Croff	1,531	3.6
Total votes		42,797	100
Republican hold			

2016 Michigan House of Representatives election
Party	Candidate	Votes	%
Republican	Klint Kesto	25,024	50.4
Democratic	Michael Stack	20,975	42.3
Independent	Beth McGrath	3,643	7.3
Total votes		49,642	100
Republican hold			

2014 Michigan House of Representatives election
Party	Candidate	Votes	%
Republican	Klint Kesto	16,741	52.3
Democratic	Sandy Colvin	15,299	47.8
Total votes		32,040	100
Republican hold			

2012 Michigan House of Representatives election
Party	Candidate	Votes	%
Republican	Klint Kesto	24,382	53.3
Democratic	Pam Jackson	21,403	46.8
Total votes		45,785	100
Republican gain from Democratic			

2010 Michigan House of Representatives election
Party	Candidate	Votes	%
Democratic	Lisa Brown	17,138	49.1
Republican	Lois Shulman	17,051	48.8
Libertarian	Nathan Allen	727	2.1
Total votes		34,916	100
Democratic hold			

2008 Michigan House of Representatives election
Party	Candidate	Votes	%
Democratic	Lisa Brown	25,426	51.6
Republican	Amy Peterman	22,721	46.1
Libertarian	Jerry Plas	1,133	2.3
Total votes		49,280	100
Democratic gain from Republican			
