= North Watervliet Road–Paw Paw Lake Outlet Bridge =

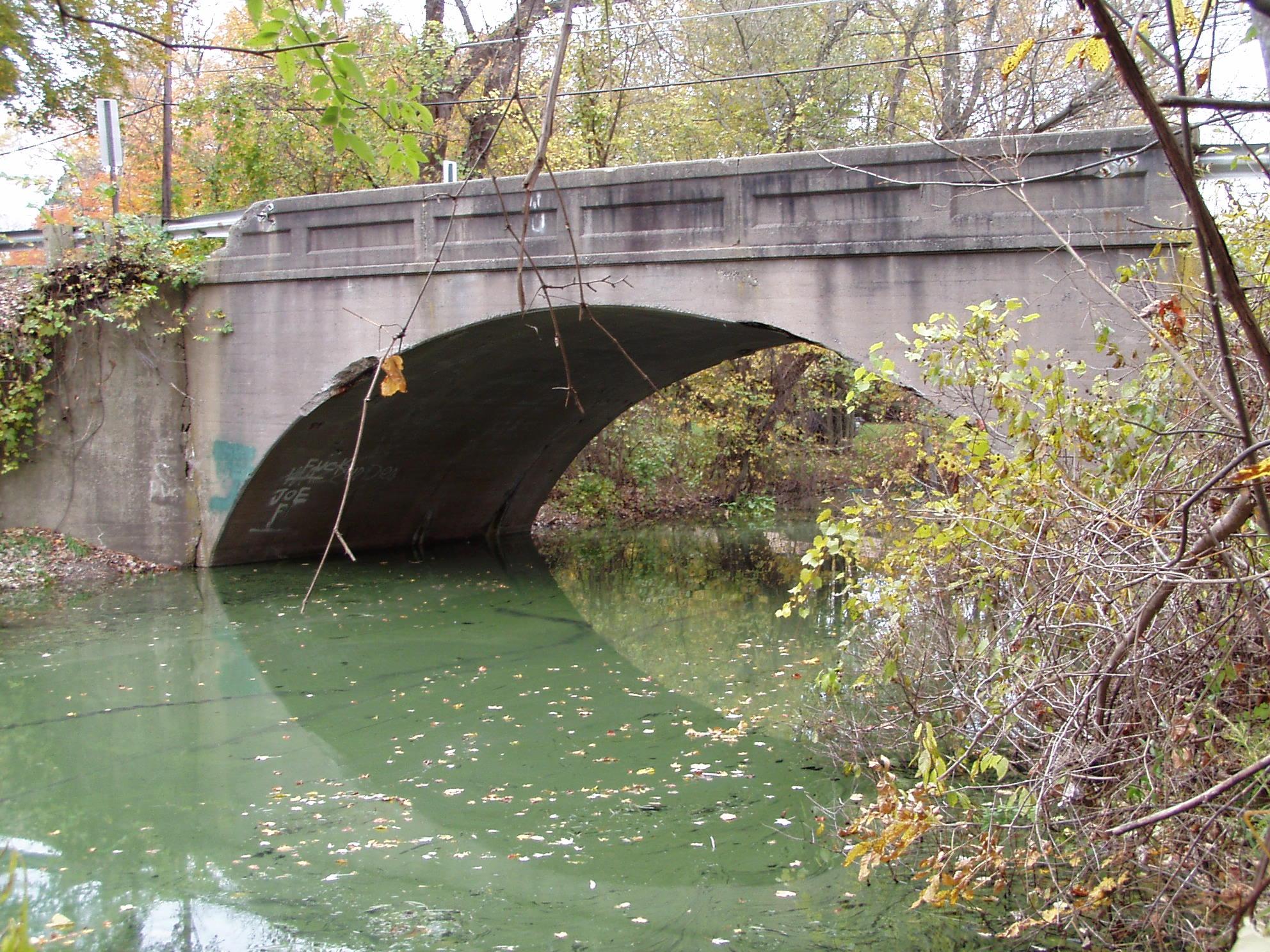
- Bridge in 2006
- Coordinates: 42°12′28″N 86°15′00″W
- Carries: M-11 (1919–1926); US 31 (1926–1931); M-140 (1931–1959)
- Crosses: Paw Paw Lake outlet
- Locale: Watervliet Township, Michigan

Characteristics
- Total length: 45 feet (14 m)
- Width: 24 feet (7.3 m)
- Longest span: 40 feet (12 m)
- No. of spans: 1

History
- Closed: 2008
- North Watervliet Road–Paw Paw Lake Outlet Bridge
- U.S. National Register of Historic Places
- Location within Michigan Location within the United States
- Coordinates: 42.2077°N 86.2501°W
- Built: 1916
- Demolished: 2008
- NRHP reference No.: 99001575
- Added to NRHP: December 17, 1999

Location
- Interactive map of North Watervliet Road–Paw Paw Lake Outlet Bridge

The North Watervliet Road–Paw Paw Lake Outlet Bridge, also known as Trunk Line Bridge No. 57, was an arch bridge in Watervliet Township, Michigan, that carried North Watervliet Road over the outlet of Paw Paw Lake into the Paw Paw River. It is listed on the National Register of Historic Places. The bridge was demolished and replaced about 2008.

== History ==
The bridge was built by the Michigan State Highway Department in 1916 according to one of their standard plans; however, the specific plans for this bridge are thought not to have survived. W. B. Rogers served as contractor, and was paid $5,269 for building the bridge. According to the bridge plates, it was originally designated Trunk Line Bridge No. 57. A photograph of the bridge taken after the completion of construction was published in 1916 in the Sixth Biennial Report of the highway department.

The bridge was eligible for inclusion on the National Register of Historic Places under Criterion C, and was listed on December 17, 1999. Two other bridges in Berrien County, the Avery Road–Galien River Bridge and the Blossomland Bridge, were added the same day.

In 2008, a contract for the demolition of the bridge and replacement by a prestressed concrete I-beam bridge was awarded to L.W. Lamb, Inc., for a low bid of $770,181.00. The project was scheduled to begin in August 2008 and finish by May 2009.

== Design and location ==
The bridge was located north of Watervliet city limits at the east end of Paw Paw Lake where it empties into the Paw Paw River. The bridge was a reinforced concrete, barrel vaulted arch bridge. It was 45 feet (14 m) long and spanned 40 feet (12 m). The parapet railings were constructed of solid concrete and had six recesses on each side. At the corners of the railings were Armco guard rails. There were identical bridge plates located at the north and south corners.

The North Watervliet Road–Paw Paw Lake Outlet Bridge was very similar to Trunk Line Bridge No. 237 in Hillsdale County.

== Gallery ==
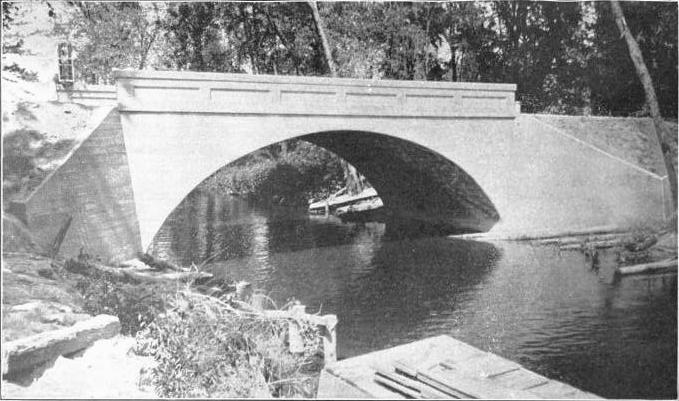
Photograph from a 1916 report by the Michigan State Highway Department

== See also ==
- List of bridges on the National Register of Historic Places in Michigan
- National Register of Historic Places listings in Berrien County, Michigan
