= Michigan's 79th House of Representatives district =

American legislative district

Michigan's 79th State House of Representatives district
Representative
Angela Rigas; R–Caledonia
- Demographics: 81.9% White; 4% Black; 6% Hispanic; 3.9% Asian; 0.2% Native American; 0.3% Other; 3.8% Multiracial
- Population (2024): 93,092

Michigan's 79th House of Representatives district (also referred to as Michigan's 79th House district) is a legislative district within the Michigan House of Representatives located in parts of Allegan, Barry, and Kent counties. The district was created in 1965, when the Michigan House of Representatives district naming scheme changed from a county-based system to a numerical one.

== List of representatives ==
Representative	Party	Dates	Residence	Notes
Bobby Crim	Democratic	1965–1966	Davison	
James F. Smith	Republican	1967–1972	Davison	
F. Robert Edwards	Republican	1973–1976	Flint	
Joe Conroy	Democratic	1977–1982	Flint	
John D. Cherry	Democratic	1983–1986	Clio	
Nate Jonker	Democratic	1987–1992	Clio	
Robert Brackenridge	Republican	1993–1998	St. Joseph	
Charles T. LaSata	Republican	1999–2004	St. Joseph	
John Proos	Republican	2005–2010	St. Joseph	
Al Pscholka	Republican	2011–2016	Stevensville	
Kim LaSata	Republican	2017–2018	Bainbridge	
Pauline Wendzel	Republican	2019–2022	Watervliet	
Angela Rigas	Republican	2023–present	Caledonia	Lived in Caledonia Township until around 2024, then in Alto until 2025.

== Recent elections ==
=== 2020s ===
2026 Michigan House of Representatives election
Party	Candidate	Votes	%
Republican	Angela Rigas (incumbent)	29,659	61.3
Democratic	Zach Abbott	18,725	38.7
Total votes		48,384	100
Republican hold			

2024 Michigan House of Representatives election
Party	Candidate	Votes	%
Republican	Angela Rigas	36,511	66.2
Democratic	Jason Rubin	18,635	33.8
Total votes		55,146	100
Republican hold			

2022 Michigan House of Representatives election
Party	Candidate	Votes	%
Republican	Angela Rigas	29,510	65.8
Democratic	Kimberly Kennedy-Barrington	15,360	34.2
Total votes		44,870	100
Republican hold			

2020 Michigan House of Representatives election
Party	Candidate	Votes	%
Republican	Pauline Wendzel	25,656	56.6
Democratic	Chokwe Pitchford	19,658	43.4
Total votes		45,314	100
Republican hold			

2018 Michigan House of Representatives election
Party	Candidate	Votes	%
Republican	Pauline Wendzel	19,411	55.7
Democratic	Joey B. Andrews	15,451	44.3
Total votes		34,862	100
Republican hold			

2016 Michigan House of Representatives election
Party	Candidate	Votes	%
Republican	Kim LaSata	23,657	58.8
Democratic	Marletta Seats	15,461	38.4
Constitution	Carl G. Oehling	1,129	2.8
Total votes		40,247	100
Republican hold			

2014 Michigan House of Representatives election
Party	Candidate	Votes	%
Republican	Al Pscholka	14,742	58.6
Democratic	Eric Lester	9,911	39.4
U.S. Taxpayers'	Carl Oehling	497	2.0
Total votes		25,150	100
Republican hold			

2012 Michigan House of Representatives election
Party	Candidate	Votes	%
Republican	Al Pscholka	21,490	52.8
Democratic	Jim Hahn	18,630	45.7
Constitution	Carl Oehling	613	1.5
Total votes		40,733	100
Republican hold			

2010 Michigan House of Representatives election
Party	Candidate	Votes	%
Republican	Al Pscholka	17,291	66.4
Democratic	Mary Brown	8,757	33.6
Total votes		26,048	100
Republican hold			

2008 Michigan House of Representatives election
Party	Candidate	Votes	%
Republican	John Proos	25,440	57.3
Democratic	Jim Hahn	18,964	42.7
Total votes		44,404	100
Republican hold			

== Historical district boundaries ==
Map	Description	Apportionment Plan	Notes
	Genesee County (part): Atlas Township; Burton Township; Clio; Davison; Davison Township; Forest Township; Grand Blanc; Grand Blanc Township; Richfield Township; Thetford Township; Vienna Township	1964 Apportionment Plan	
	Genesee County (part): Flint (part); Flint Township (part); Mount Morris Township (part); Vienna Township (part)	1972 Apportionment Plan	
	Genesee County (part): Clayton Township (part); Clio; Flushing; Flushing Township; Forest Township; Montrose Township; Mount Morris Township; Thetford Township; Vienna Township	1982 Apportionment Plan	
	Berrien County (part): Bainbridge Township; Benton Charter Township; Benton Harbor; Coloma; Coloma Charter Township; Hagar Township; Lincoln Charter Township; St. Joseph; St. Joseph Charter Township; Watervliet; Watervliet Township	1992 Apportionment Plan	
	Berrien County (part): Bainbridge Township; Benton Charter Township; Benton Harbor; Bridgman; Coloma; Coloma Charter Township; Hagar Township; Lake Charter Township; Lincoln Charter Township; Royalton Township; Sodus Township; St. Joseph; St. Joseph Charter Township; Watervliet; Watervliet Township	2001 Apportionment Plan	
	Berrien County (part): Bainbridge Township; Benton Charter Township; Benton Harbor; Bridgman; Coloma; Coloma Charter Township; Hagar Township; Lake Charter Township; Lincoln Charter Township; Royalton Township; St. Joseph; St. Joseph Charter Township; Watervliet; Watervliet Township	2011 Apportionment Plan	
