= Covert Public Schools =

School district in Michigan, United States

Address
- 35323 M-140 Covert, Van Buren County, Michigan, 49043; United States

District information
- Grades: PreKindergarten–12
- Superintendent: Joseph Allen
- Schools: 3
- Budget: $6,668,000 2022–2023 expenditures
- NCES District ID: 2610980

Students and staff
- Students: 324 (2024–2025)
- Teachers: 22.17 (on an FTE basis) (2024–2025)
- Staff: 48.17 FTE (2024–2025)
- Student–teacher ratio: 14.61 (2024–2025)
- District mascot: Bulldogs

Other information
- Website: www.covertps.org

Covert Public Schools is a public school district in Van Buren County, in West Michigan. It serves parts of the townships of Coloma, Covert, South Haven, and Watervliet.

== History ==
Covert Public Schools is known for its racial integration during the late 19th century. In 1868, Covert's population was 8 to 10 percent Black. At a time when Black and white communities did not often mix, the progressive town of Covert had several interracial families, integrated churches, and elected a Black leader of its roads department. Despite it being illegal to educate Black and white students together, the Covert school board did not report the race of its students to the state, enabling all children to go to school together.

The first building on the current site was built in 1922. The elementary school wing and a new gymnasium were completed in 1959. The current middle/high school section opened in fall 1976, when the 1922 building was torn down.

== Schools ==
Schools in Covert Public Schools district share a building at 35323 M-141, south of the village of Covert.

Schools in Covert Public Schools district
School	Notes
Covert High School	Grades 9–12
Covert Middle School	Grades 6-8
Covert Elementary	Grades PreK-5
