= David Law =

David Law may refer to:

- David Law (cartoonist) (1908–1971), Scottish cartoonist
- David Law (broadcaster) (born 1973), tennis broadcaster
- David Law (golfer) (born 1991), Scottish golfer
- David Jude Law (born 1972), actor
- David Law (athlete) (1930–2011), English athlete
- David Law (politician) (born 1969), American politician

== See also ==
- David Laws (disambiguation)
