= Angela Rigas =

American politician from Michigan

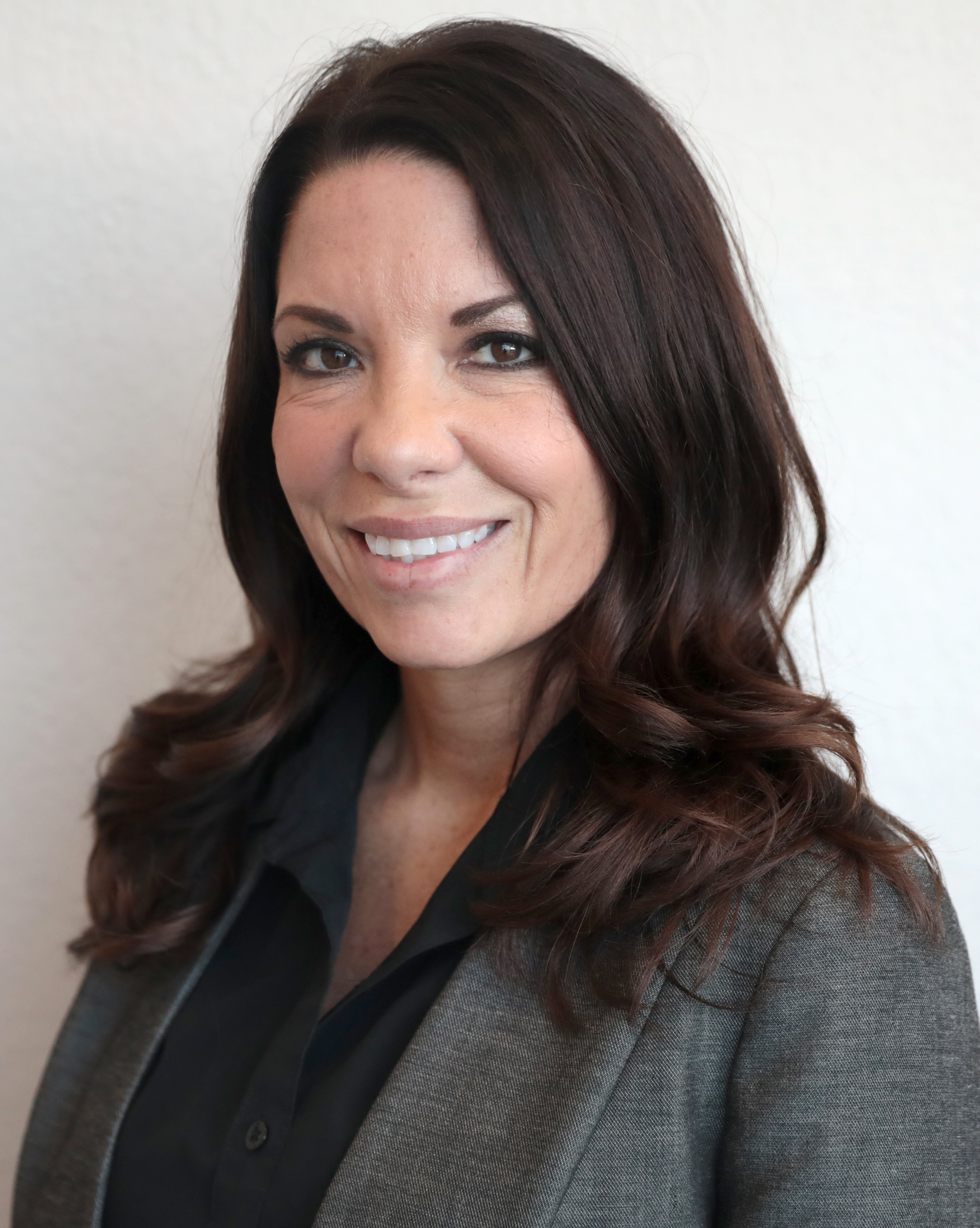

Member of the Michigan House of Representatives from the 79th district
- Incumbent
- Assumed office January 1, 2023
- Preceded by: Pauline Wendzel (redistricting)

Personal details
- Born: Hastings, Michigan
- Party: Republican
- Education: Hastings High School

Angela Rigas is an American politician from Michigan. A member of the Republican Party, she was elected to the Michigan House of Representatives in the 2022 election from the 79th district, and took office in 2023. After the 2020 presidential election, Rigas questioned the election result and took part in the rally that preceded the January 6 attack at the U.S. Capitol.

== Early political involvement and January 6 attack ==
Rigas, a salon owner, defied stay-at-home orders during the COVID-19 pandemic in Michigan. In May 2020, she was one of seven barbers cited for disorderly conduct for their participation in the "Operation Haircut" protest, in which they refused to stop offering free haircuts on the lawn outside the Michigan State Capitol in Lansing. The charges against the seven were ultimately dismissed. Rigas also espoused anti-vaccine misinformation.

On January 6, 2021, Rigas participated in the Washington, D.C., rally that preceded the attack against the U.S. Capitol by an armed, far-right mob of Donald Trump supporters who stormed the seat of Congress. In a January 6 Facebook post, Rigas denounced U.S. Capitol Police officers who responded to the riot, comparing them to Revolutionary-era British redcoats. Rigas called the day "a highlight of my life" and claimed that she had been tear-gassed while outside the Capitol. Throughout 2021, Rigas promoted Trump's false claim that he was the real winner of the 2020 presidential election in Michigan, and she was among a number of election deniers who gained influence within the Michigan Republican Party.

== Michigan House of Representatives ==
=== 2022 election ===
In 2022, Rigas ran for the Michigan House of Representatives from the House District 79 in southwest Michigan. The district encompasses the portion of Kent County that is south of M-6 and west of Alto, as well as a portion of Allegan and Barry counties. Rigas was one of at least 13 January 6 attendees to run for office in 2022, and one of ten 2022 Michigan candidates endorsed by Trump.

She defeated two rivals in the August 2022 Republican primary election. In the November 2022 general election, she faced Democratic nominee Kimberly Kennedy-Barrington, of Byron Center, a Navy veteran and small business owner. Rigas won with 29,510 votes (65.77%), defeating Kennedy-Barrington, who took 15,360 votes (34.23%). Statewide, however, Michigan Republicans suffered historic losses, with Democratic Governor Gretchen Whitmer winning a second turn and the Democrats winning majorities in both the state House and state Senate for the first time in forty years. Days after the general election, Rigas, along with fellow Republicans Neil Friske and Steve Carra, formed the Grand New Party, a PAC that accused Michigan Republican leaders of being "too moderate" and called for a more aggressive strategy against Whitmer.

=== Tenure ===
Upon taking office in 2023, Rigas joined the newly declared Freedom Caucus, a far-right faction of eight Republican state representatives. New Speaker Joe Tate initially did not give a committee assignment to Rigas, as well as Mike Hoadley and Matt Maddock; later, the three were added to the House Committee on Housing; Rigas complained about her assignment. In March 2023, Rigas was appointed to the executive board of the House Republican Campaign Committee.

In 2023, Rigas denounced a package of gun bills introduced by Michigan Democrats, including the Michigan red flag law, safe storage law, and universal background checks. In a floor speech, Rigas called the package an example of "tyrannical government"; at a rally against the bills, she said, "We will fight those until they're overturned." She sponsored legislation to allow the concealed carrying of handguns without a permit and described Michigan as a "Democrat dictatorship."

In June 2023, Rigas was one of a handful of representatives to vote against legislation to raise the minimum marriage age to 18. The bill passed on a 104–5, with four other Republicans (Carra, Friske, Maddock, and Josh Schriver) also voting no.

In September 2023, Rigas was one of 11 Michigan Republicans who sued the state in federal court, contending that Michigan voter-approved initiatives that expanded voting access (specifically, Proposal 3 of 2018 and Proposal 2 of 2022, which expanded access to in-person early voting and mail-in voting) were illegal. The federal district court dismissed the case in April 2024.

Rigas has been variously described as a resident of Alto or Caledonia.

Rigas was reelected to the state House in 2024.

== See also ==
- Official website
- Campaign website
