= Ryan Berman =

American politician from Michigan

Member of the Michigan House of Representatives from the 39th district
- In office January 1, 2019 – December 31, 2022
- Preceded by: Klint Kesto
- Succeeded by: Pauline Wendzel

Personal details
- Party: Republican
- Spouse: Stacie
- Children: 2
- Education: Michigan State University (BA); Wayne State University (JD)

Ryan Berman (born October 1980) is an American attorney and politician, serving as a member of Michigan House of Representatives from district 39. Elected in November 2018, he assumed office on January 1, 2019.

== Early life and education ==
A native of West Bloomfield, Michigan, Berman graduated from Detroit Country Day School. He earned a Bachelor of Arts degree in psychology from Michigan State University in 2002 and a Juris Doctor from the Wayne State University Law School in 2004.

== Career ==
In 2005, Berman became an attorney. He served as a special prosecutor in the Palm Beach County, Florida State Attorney's Office in 2009 and later worked as the general counsel for Inergi LP. On November 6, 2018, Berman won the election and became a Republican member of the Michigan House of Representatives for district 39.

In August 2021, Berman declared his candidacy for Michigan attorney general in the 2022 election.

== Personal life ==
Berman and his wife, Stacie, have two children. He lives in Commerce Township, Michigan.
