= Watervliet Public Schools =

School district in Michigan, United States

Address
- 450 East St. Joseph Street Watervliet, Berrien County, Michigan, 49098; United States

District information
- Motto: Working together to keep us together.
- Grades: Pre-Kindergarten-12
- Schools: 5
- Budget: $23,028,000 2022-2023 expenditures
- NCES District ID: 2635460

Students and staff
- Students: 1,436 (2023-2024)
- Teachers: 81.38 (on an FTE basis) (2023-2024)
- Staff: 181.56 FTE (2023-2024)
- Student–teacher ratio: 17.65 (2023-2024)

Other information
- Website: www.watervlietps.org

Watervliet Public Schools is a public school district in West Michigan. In Berrien County, it serves Watervliet and parts of the townships of Bainbridge and Watervliet. In Van Buren County, it serves parts of the townships of Covert, Hartford, and Keeler.

== History ==
A new school building opened in Watervliet in fall 1890, and included a high school. It was used until the next high school opened in January 1925. That school was located at the corner of Red Arrow Highway and M-140. North and South Elementary Schools were built in 1953.

The current Watervliet High School opened in fall 1967 and was dedicated in April 1968. Planning for the building began after Watervliet voters turned down a merger with Coloma Community School District in 1964, and Watervliet had a better idea of its facilities needs. Trend Associates of Kalamazoo was the architect.

The 1925 high school building then became the district's middle school, but it was closed after the 1976-1977 school year. A resident insisted that the building’s roof had structural problems, and an engineering study confirmed it. The district could not afford repairs, and retrofitting the building to meet fire code posed additional challenges. Students were redistributed to other district schools.

In 1999, an addition was built at the high school to house middle school students who were already attending school in the building. The 1925 school building was torn down in 2004.

== Schools ==
Schools in Watervliet Public Schools
School	Address	Notes
Watervliet High School	450 E. Red Arrow Highway, Watervliet	Grades 9-12. Built 1967.
Watervliet Middle School	450 East Red Arrow Hwy., Watervliet	Grades 6-8. Shares a building with Watervliet High School.
North Elementary	287 W. Baldwin Ave., Watervliet	Grades 3-5. Built 1953.
South Elementary	433 Lucinda Lane, Watervliet	Grades PreK-2. Built 1953.
WAY Program	450 E. Red Arrow Highway, Watervliet	Alternative/online high school housed at Watervliet High School
