= Hagar Township, Michigan =

- Civil township
- Seal

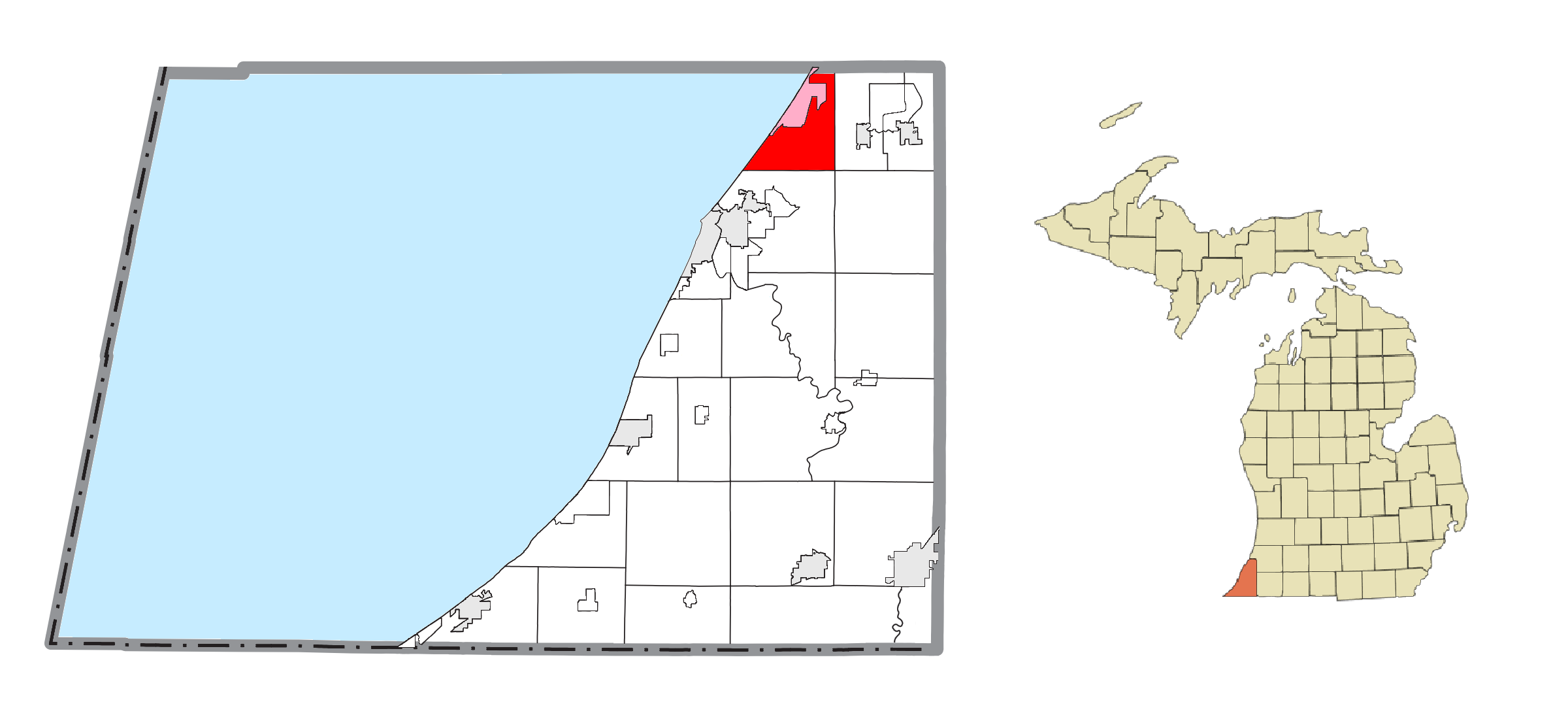
- Location within Berrien County (red) and the administered community of Lake Michigan Beach (pink)

- Location within the state of Michigan Hagar Township (the United States)
- Coordinates: 42°12′17″N 86°22′52″W
- Country: United States
- State: Michigan
- County: Berrien
- Organized: 1846

Area
  - Total: 18.7 sq mi (48.4 km^{2})
  - Land: 18.4 sq mi (47.6 km^{2})
  - Water: 0.31 sq mi (0.8 km^{2})
- Elevation: 653 ft (199 m)

Population (2020)
  - Total: 3,243
- Time zone: UTC-5 (Eastern (EST))
  - Summer (DST): UTC-4 (EDT)
- ZIP code(s): 49022, 49038, 49084
- Area code: 269
- FIPS code: 26-35860
- GNIS feature ID: 1626418
- Website: Official website

Hagar Township is a civil township of Berrien County in the U.S. state of Michigan. As of the 2020 census, the township population was 3,243.

The township is in the north of the county with Lake Michigan to the northwest, Covert Township in Van Buren County to the north, Coloma Charter Township to the east, Bainbridge Township to the southeast, and Benton Charter Township to the south.

== Communities ==
There are no incorporated municipalities within the township. The unincorporated communities of Riverside and Lake Michigan Beach (also known as "Hagar Shores") are within the township.

== History ==
Charles Lamb and his wife came to the area from Vermont in 1839 to become the first European-American settlers. The township was officially organized on March 25, 1846.

== Geography ==
According to the United States Census Bureau, the township has a total area of 18.7 square miles (48.4 km^{2}), of which 18.4 square miles (47.6 km^{2}) is land and 0.31 square miles (0.8 km^{2}), or 1.76%, is water.

Interstate 196/US 31 serves the township with two interchanges, and M-63 passes through the township along the shore of Lake Michigan.

The Paw Paw River flows to the southwest through the township.

== Demographics ==
As of the census of 2000, there were 3,964 people, 1,639 households, and 1,085 families residing in the township. The population density was 213.4 inhabitants per square mile (82.4/km^{2}). There were 2,122 housing units at an average density of 114.2 per square mile (44.1/km^{2}). The racial makeup of the township was 95.59% White, 1.74% African American, 0.71% Native American, 0.30% Asian, 0.83% from other races, and 0.83% from two or more races. Hispanic or Latino of any race were 2.14% of the population.

There were 1,639 households, out of which 29.1% had children under the age of 18 living with them, 53.5% were married couples living together, 8.8% had a female householder with no husband present, and 33.8% were non-families. 27.5% of all households were made up of individuals, and 9.0% had someone living alone who was 65 years of age or older. The average household size was 2.41 and the average family size was 2.94.

In the township the population was spread out, with 23.8% under the age of 18, 8.1% from 18 to 24, 30.4% from 25 to 44, 25.2% from 45 to 64, and 12.6% who were 65 years of age or older. The median age was 38 years. For every 100 females, there were 97.5 males. For every 100 females age 18 and over, there were 97.1 males.

The median income for a household in the township was $38,614, and the median income for a family was $47,768. Males had a median income of $34,890 versus $23,924 for females. The per capita income for the township was $19,710. About 6.5% of families and 8.0% of the population were below the poverty line, including 6.1% of those under age 18 and 4.6% of those age 65 or over.
