= Avery Road–Galien River Bridge =

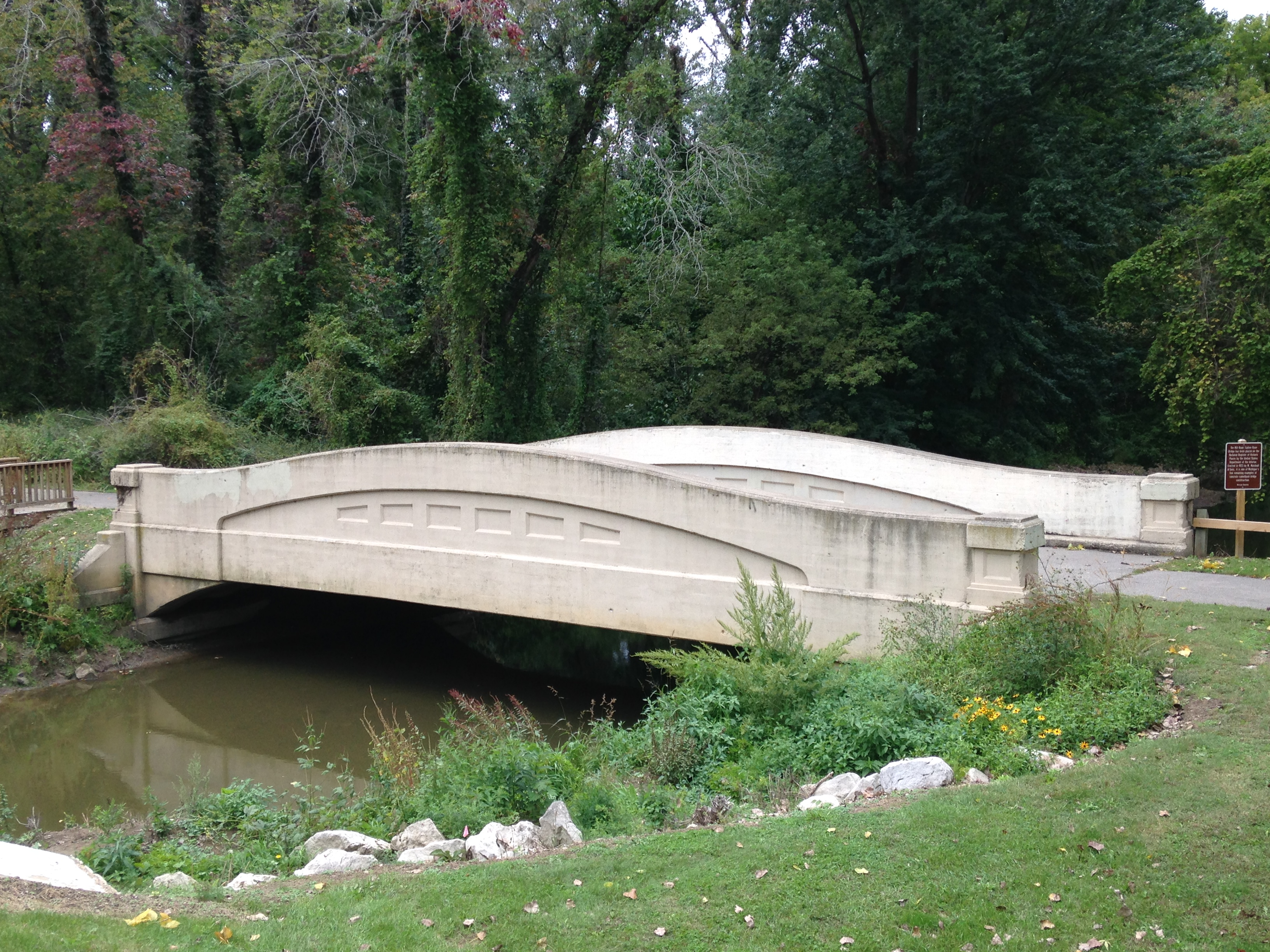
- Coordinates: 41.8743°N 86.5549°W
- Crosses: Galien River
- Locale: New Troy, Michigan
- Other name: Mill Road–Galien River Bridge

Characteristics
- Design: Curved-chord through-girder
- Total length: 60 feet (18 m)
- Width: 25.7 feet (7.8 m)
- Longest span: 57 feet (17 m)
- No. of spans: 1

Location
- Interactive map of Avery Road–Galien River Bridge

References
- Avery Road–Galien River Bridge
- U.S. National Register of Historic Places
- Location within Michigan Location within the United States
- Built: By 1928, likely 1923
- NRHP reference No.: 99001577
- Added to NRHP: December 17, 1999

The Avery Road–Galien River Bridge is a bridge that carried Avery Road (also known as Mill Road) over the Galien River near New Troy, Michigan. The year of construction is uncertain, but it was built by 1928. The bridge is listed on the National Register of Historic Places.

== History ==
A map shows that the location of this bridge has served as a river crossing since at least 1860. Avery Road was constructed in 1922, and it is likely that the bridge was built at about the same time, but the year of construction is not known for sure. A set of road plans dated July 1922 shows what appears to be a one-lane bridge at the site, though there is no mention of a new bridge. A Historic Bridge Inventory Form completed in 1982 indicates that construction took place in 1928, a date repeated in a 1995 inventory. However, the minutes of the county road commission from 1926 to 1929 make no mention of the bridge, rendering the date suspect. The department's Tenth Biennial Report, for the period July 1, 1922, to June 30, 1924, lists a State Reward Bridge built by "W. Marshall & Son" that appears to be the same type and in the correct location. A bridge plate (since removed) corroborates this information, making a date circa 1923 likely. The bridge was built by the Michigan State Highway Department, during Frank F. Rogers time as commissioner, and the Board of Berrien County Road Commissioners. W. Marshall and Sons of Grand Rapids, Michigan, served as contractor.

At some point, a new bridge was built adjacent to the historic bridge that now carries Avery Road.

The bridge was listed on the National Register of Historic Places on December 17, 1999. Two other bridges in Berrien County, the Blossomland Bridge and the North Watervliet Road–Paw Paw Lake Outlet Bridge, were added the same day.

== Design and location ==
The Avery Road–Galien River Bridge is a curved-chord through-girder bridge designed according to standard plans. It is one of the oldest examples of this type of bridge. The bridge crosses the north-flowing Galien River at about its midpoint near the village of New Troy.

== See also ==
- List of bridges on the National Register of Historic Places in Michigan
- National Register of Historic Places listings in Berrien County, Michigan
