= Patrick L. Harrington =

American politician

Member of the Michigan House of Representatives from the 39th district
- In office January 1, 1981 – December 31, 1982
- Preceded by: Raymond C. Kehres
- Succeeded by: Jerry Carl Bartnik

Personal details
- Born: September 17, 1956 (age 69)
- Party: Democratic

Patrick L. Harrington (born September 17, 1956) is a former member of the Michigan House of Representatives.

== Early life ==
Harrington was born on September 17, 1956.

== Career ==
On November 4, 1980, Harrington was elected to the Michigan House of Representatives where he represented the 39th district from January 14, 1981 to December 31, 1982. During his term, he served as the chamber's Majority Floor Whip for the Democratic Party. In 1982, Harrington was defeated in his run for the Michigan Senate seat representing the 11th district.

== Personal life ==
During his time in the Michigan Legislature, Harrington resided in Monroe, Michigan.
