= Watervliet High School =

Location
- 450 East Red Arrow Highway; Watervliet, Michigan 49098; United States
- Coordinates: 42°11′16″N 86°15′09″W

Information
- Type: Public secondary school
- School district: Watervliet Public Schools
- Superintendent: Ric Seager
- Principal: Christina Powers
- Teaching staff: 19.10 (on an FTE basis)
- Grades: 9-12
- Enrollment: 376 (2023-2024)
- Student to teacher ratio: 19.69
- Colors: Maroon and white
- Athletics conference: Southwestern Athletic Conference
- Nickname: Panthers
- Website: www.watervlietps.org/o/high-school

Watervliet High School is a public secondary school in Watervliet, Michigan, United States. It serves students in grades 9-12 for the Watervliet Public Schools.

== Academics ==
In the 2019 U.S. News & World Report annual ranking of high schools, Watervliet was ranked 5,771st nationally and 207th in Michigan.

== Demographics ==
The demographic breakdown of the 382 students enrolled for 2017-18 was:

- Male - 50.0%
- Female - 50.0%
- Native American/Alaskan - 1.3%
- Asian - 0.5%
- Black - 3.4%
- Hispanic - 9.9%
- White - 81.7%
- Multiracial- 3.4

All of the students were eligible for free or reduced-cost lunch.

== Athletics ==
The Watervliet Panthers competes in the Southwestern Athletic Conference. School colors are maroon and white. The following Michigan High School Athletic Association (MHSAA) sanctioned sports are offered:

- Baseball (boys)
  - State Champions - 2024
- Basketball (girls and boys)
- Cross country (girls and boys)
  - Boys state runner up - 1973
- Football (boys)
  - State runner up - 1979
- Golf (boys)
- Soccer (girls and boys)
- Softball (girls)
- Track and field (girls and boys)
- Volleyball (girls)
  - State Quarter Finals 2022
- Wrestling (boys)
