= David Laws (disambiguation) =

David Laws is a civil servant.

David Laws may also refer to:

- David Laws (rugby league)

== See also ==
- David Law (disambiguation)
