= Blossomland Bridge =

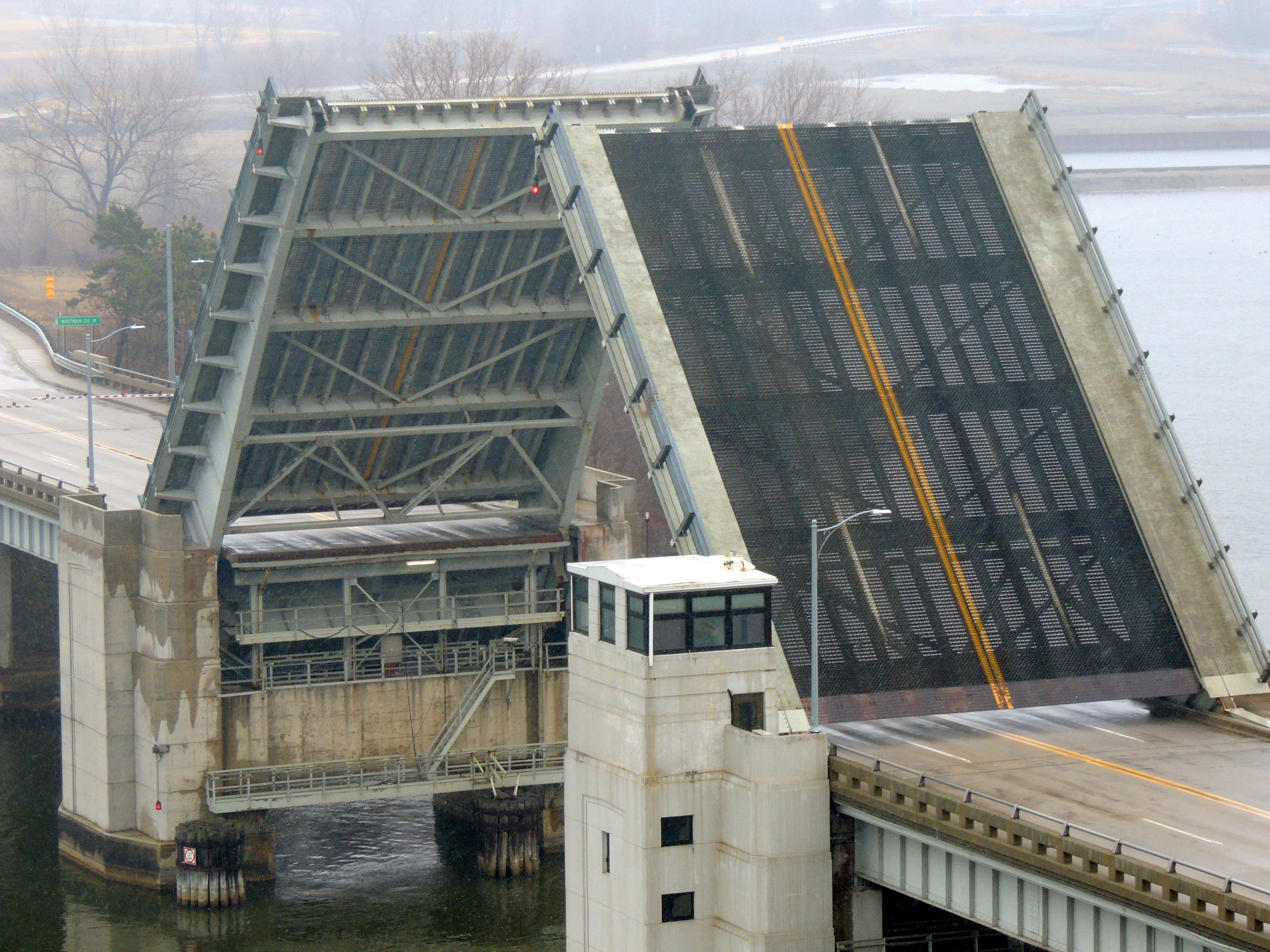
- Bridge in the raised position in 2013
- Coordinates: 42.1122°N 86.4778°W
- Carries: M-63
- Crosses: St. Joseph River
- Locale: St. Joseph, Michigan

Characteristics
- Total length: 713 feet (217 m)
- Width: 57.8 feet (17.6 m)
- Longest span: 164 feet (50 m)
- No. of spans: 7

History
- Construction start: 1947
- Construction end: 1948
- Construction cost: over $1.3 million

Location
- Interactive map of Blossomland Bridge

References
- Blossomland Bridge
- U.S. National Register of Historic Places
- Location within Michigan Location within the United States
- NRHP reference No.: 99001576
- Added to NRHP: December 17, 1999

The Blossomland Bridge is a bascule bridge in St. Joseph, Michigan, that carries M-63 across the St. Joseph River. Delayed by World War II, construction took place from 1947 though 1948. At the time, it was the longest bridge built by the Michigan State Highway Department. The bridge is listed on the National Register of Historic Places.

== History ==
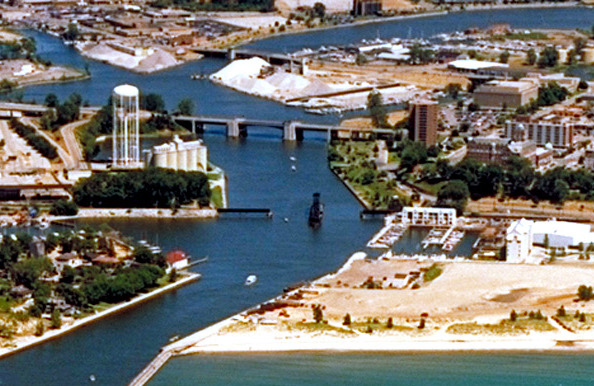
The Blossomland Bridge is the middle of the three bridges. Image is undated, but predates November 2004.

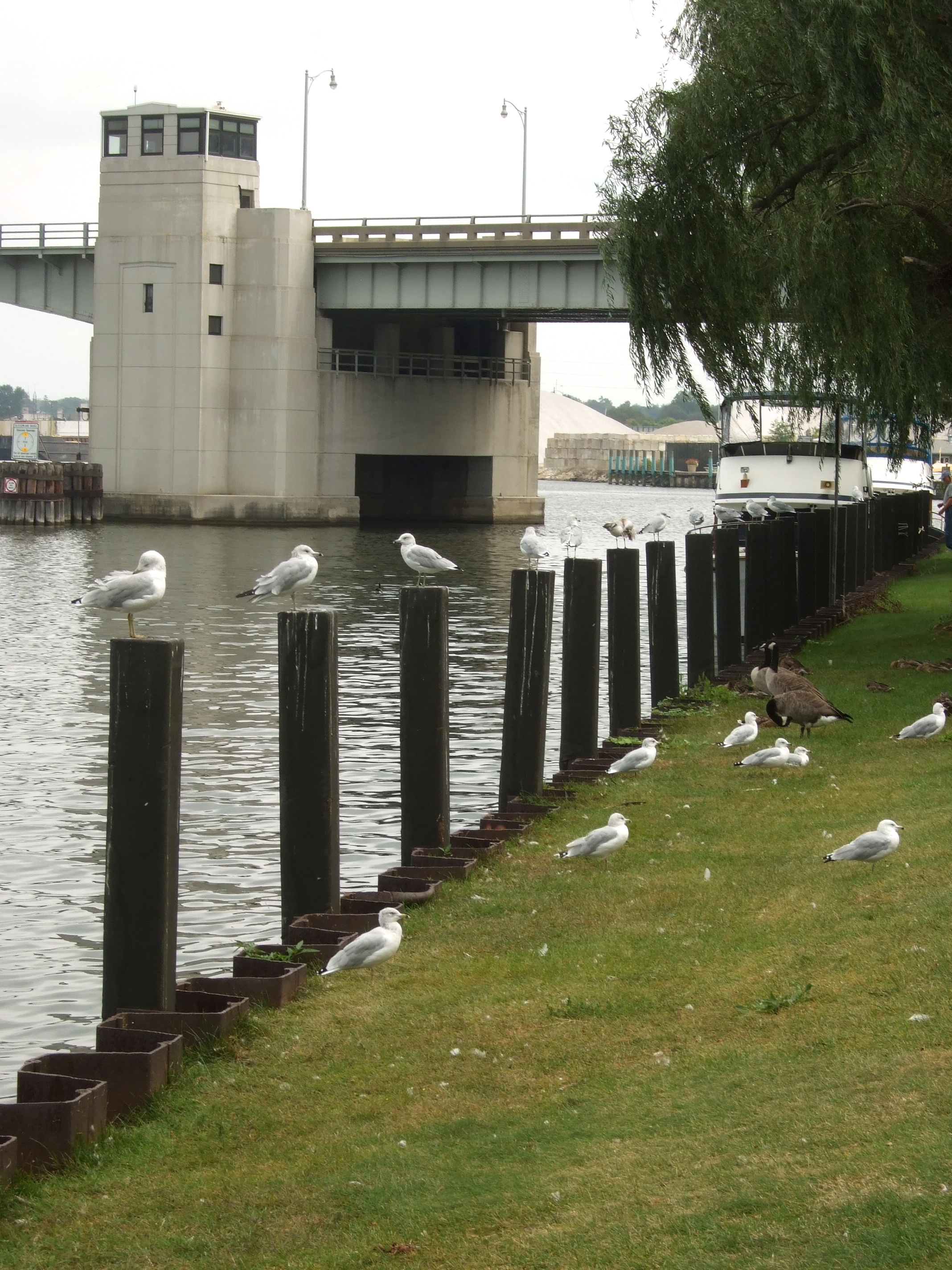
Detail of one of the bridge's concrete piers

Traffic congestion between St. Joseph and Benton Harbor prompted the state highway department to relocate U.S. Route 31, now M-63. The route included a moveable span that exacerbated the problem due to its frequent breakdowns. A new bridge was needed to span the St. Joseph River, which carried steamboat traffic, resulting in a bascule design. Plans were discussed in the early 1940s, but construction was delayed until after the end of World War II. Even though supply shortages continued after war's end, the Blossomland Bridge was one of the state's priorities.

The bridge was designed by consulting engineers Hazelet and Erdal of Chicago, a process thought to be completed by the end of 1946. Some financial aid was obtained by the highway department from the federal government. Construction bids were requested in December 1946, and when opened on January 9, 1947, W. J. Meagher and Sons of Bay City was awarded the role of general contractor at a bid of $747,497. American Bridge Company supplied and erected the bridge steel for $512,240. Construction was completed in 1948 at a total cost of over $1.3 million, and the bridge was pictured on the cover of Michigan Roads and Construction in November. It was dedicated on October 27, 1948, in honor of the mayor of St. Joseph, Waldo V. Tiscornia. Commissioner of the highway department Charles Ziegler served as guest of honor at the ribbon-cutting ceremony. At the time, it was the longest bridge built under the auspices of the highway department. The bridge opened December 24, 1948, after road approaches were completed.

Rehabilitation work took place in 1966, including the replacement of the original railings, remnants of which are located along a staircase at one corner of the bridge.

The bridge was eligible for inclusion on the National Register of Historic Places under Criterion C for its rare type and connection to the engineering firm of Hazelet and Erdal. The bridge was listed on the register on December 17, 1999. Two other bridges in Berrien County, the Avery Road–Galien River Bridge and the North Watervliet Road–Paw Paw Lake Outlet Bridge, were added the same day.

== Design and location ==
The Blossomland Bridge is in northern downtown St. Joseph. The bridge has seven spans with a Scherzer rolling-lift bascule main span. The bascule span and the two flanking it are built of steel deck plate-girders, while the nothermmost and three southernmost spans are steel stringers. The main span is supported by machinery-containing concrete piers, while the approaches are supported by four-column concrete piers. The abutments and wing walls are also made of concrete.

At the bridge's southern corner is a staircase which leads down to the location of a former road and railroad tracks. The metal panel railings on these stairs are original and constituted the bridge's main railings before they were replaced. There is a bridge plate at southern corner and a memorial plate at the southeastern pedestrian refuge.

== See also ==
- List of bridges on the National Register of Historic Places in Michigan
- National Register of Historic Places listings in Berrien County, Michigan
