= Mill Creek (Paw Paw River tributary) =

Stream in the U.S. state of Michigan

Coordinates: 42°11′30″N 86°15′22″W

Mill Creek is a stream in the U.S. state of Michigan. It is a tributary to the Paw Paw River.

Mill Creek was named for the sawmills along its course.
