= Al Pscholka =

American politician (born 1960)

Member of the Michigan House of Representatives from the 79th district
- In office January 1, 2011 – December 31, 2016
- Preceded by: John Proos
- Succeeded by: Kim LaSata

Personal details
- Born: September 6, 1960 (age 65) Saginaw, Michigan, U.S.
- Party: Republican
- Spouse: Sue Pscholka
- Profession: Politician

Al Pscholka (born September 6, 1960) is the former Budget Director of the State of Michigan. He is a former member of the Michigan House of Representatives first elected in November 2010 representing Michigan's 79th House district. In November 2012, he was re-elected to serve another term, during which time he served as the Majority Caucus Chair for the Republican Caucus.

Pscholka has a bachelor's degree from Western Michigan University. Prior to his election to the state legislature he worked as District Director for Congressman Fred Upton; fostered partnerships between business and education through his work at Cornerstone Alliance; served eight years on the Lincoln Charter Township, Michigan Board of Trustees; as well as serving seven years on the Southwest Regional Water and Sewer Authority.

Pscholka was the author of the Fiscal Accountability Act, or Michigan's P.A. 4 of 2011, which addresses financial emergency in the State of Michigan. This legislation was the primary prompt for an unsuccessful recall campaign against him in 2011, one of many against members of the Michigan House of Representatives that year. The act was repealed via Proposal 1 on the November 2012 ballot. In 2014 he unsuccessfully sought to become the Speaker of the Michigan House of Representatives.
