= New Troy, Michigan =

- Census-designated place (CDP) & unincorporated community
- Location within the state of Michigan New Troy (the United States)
- Coordinates: 41°52′34″N 86°32′59″W
- Country: United States
- State: Michigan
- County: Berrien
- Township: Weesaw

Area
  - Total: 1.33 sq mi (3.44 km^{2})
  - Land: 1.32 sq mi (3.43 km^{2})
  - Water: 0 sq mi (0.00 km^{2})
- Elevation: 646 ft (197 m)

Population (2020)
  - Total: 483
  - Density: 364.6/sq mi (140.78/km^{2})
- Time zone: UTC-5 (Eastern (EST))
  - Summer (DST): UTC-4 (EDT)
- ZIP code(s): 49119
- Area code: 269
- FIPS code: 26-57660
- GNIS feature ID: 0633343

New Troy is an unincorporated community and census-designated place in Berrien County in the U.S. state of Michigan. The population was 483 at the 2020 census.

== Geography ==
The community is located on the north side of the Galien River in the northwestern part of Weesaw Township, about 6 miles (10 km) south of Bridgman.

According to the United States Census Bureau, the CDP has a total area of 1.3 square miles (3.4 km^{2}), of which 0.0019 square miles (0.005 km^{2}), or 0.14%, is water.

== Mill Road-Galien River Bridge ==
Mill Road-Galien River Bridge is on the National Register of Historic Places, placed there by the United States Department of the Interior. Galien River Bridge is one of the few remaining concrete camelback bridges in Michigan, according to the plaque.

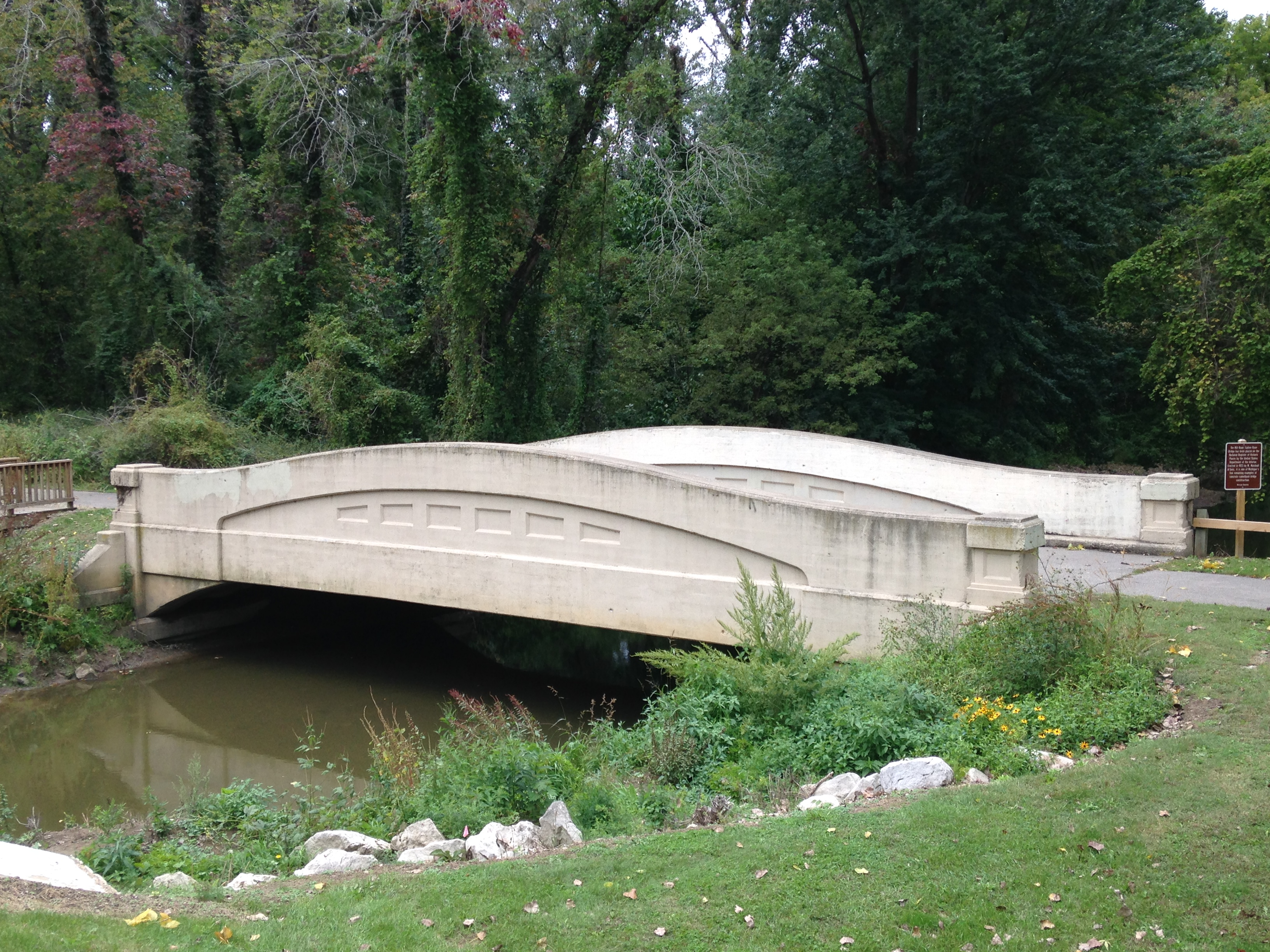

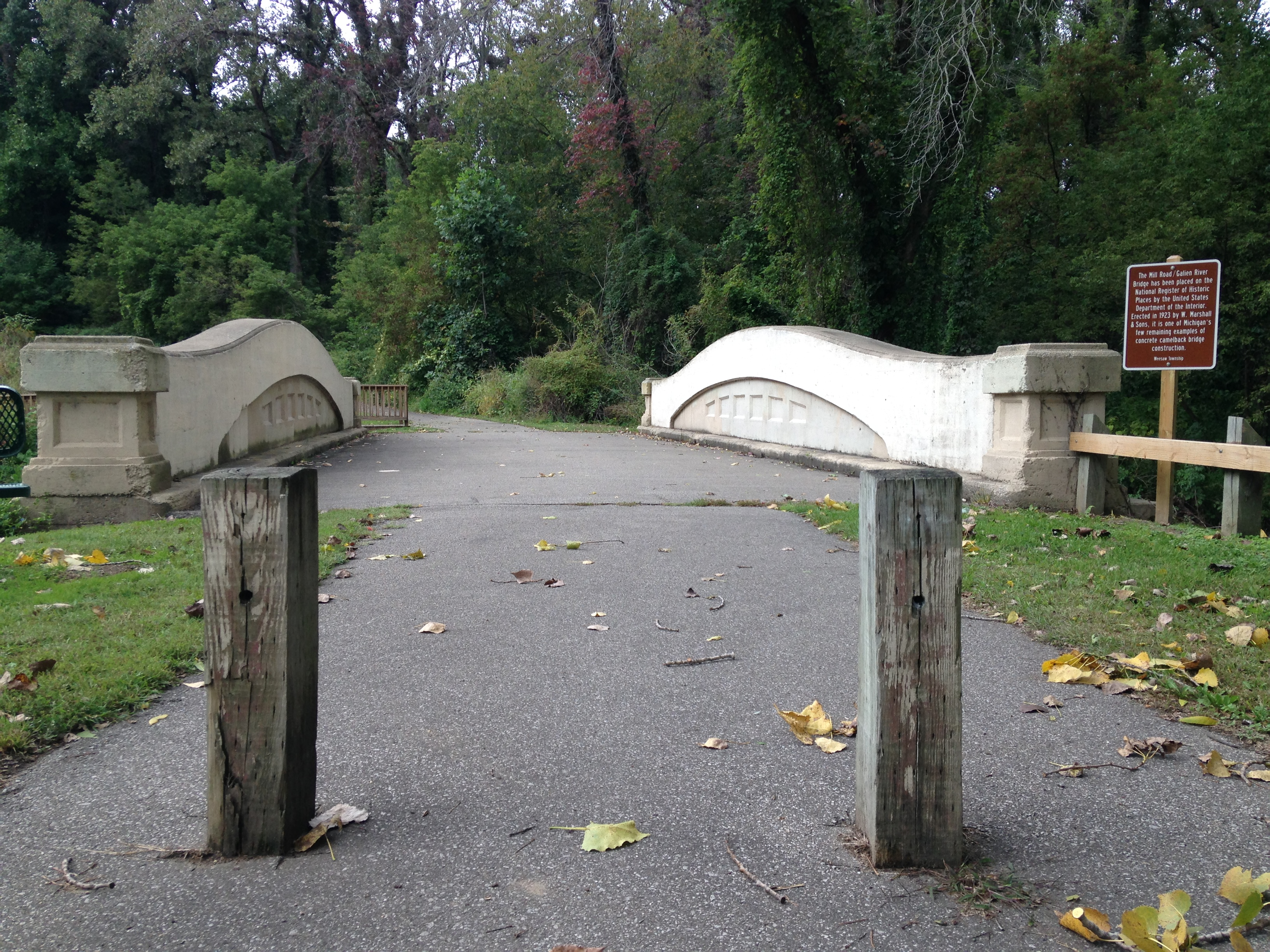

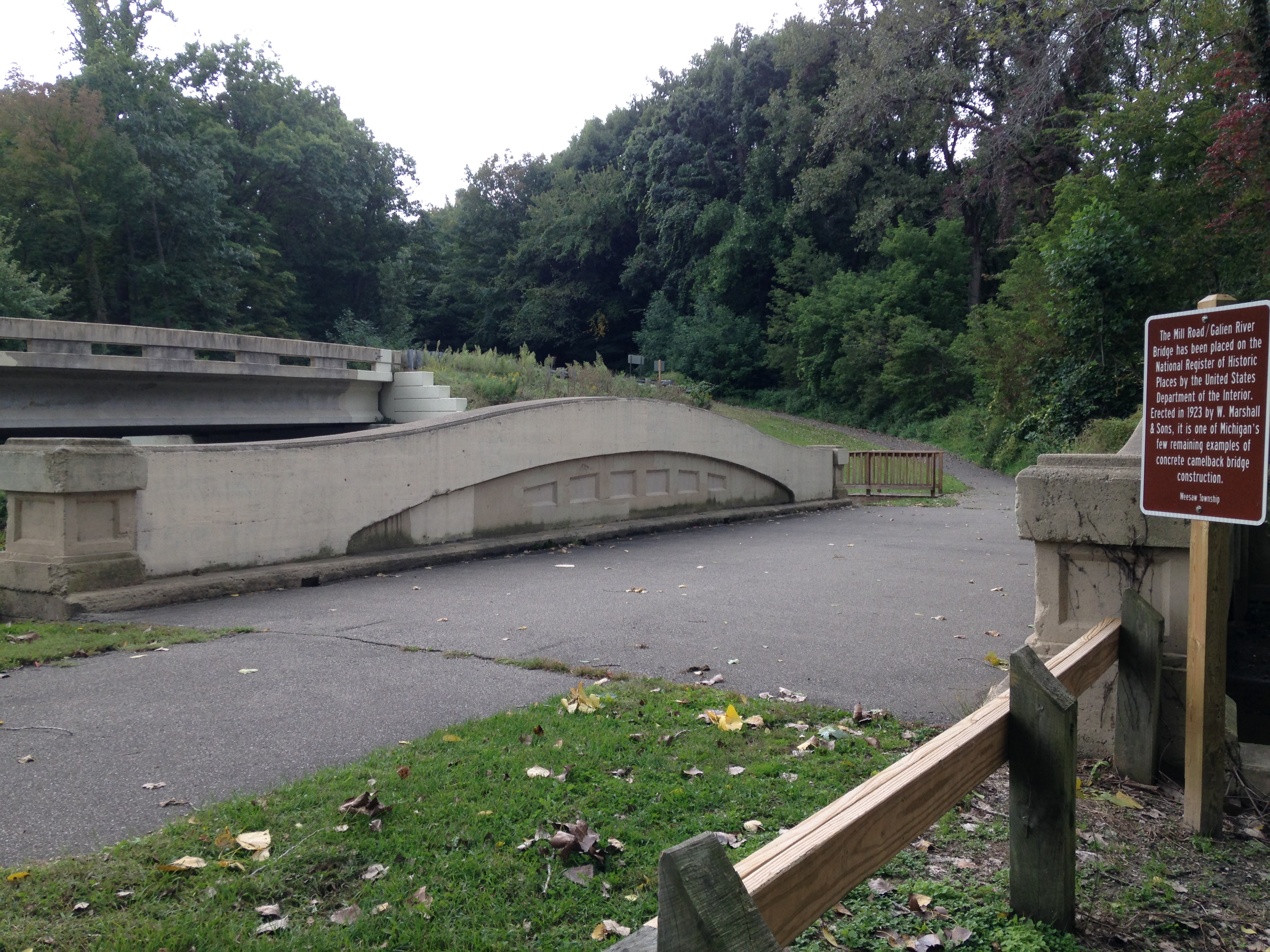

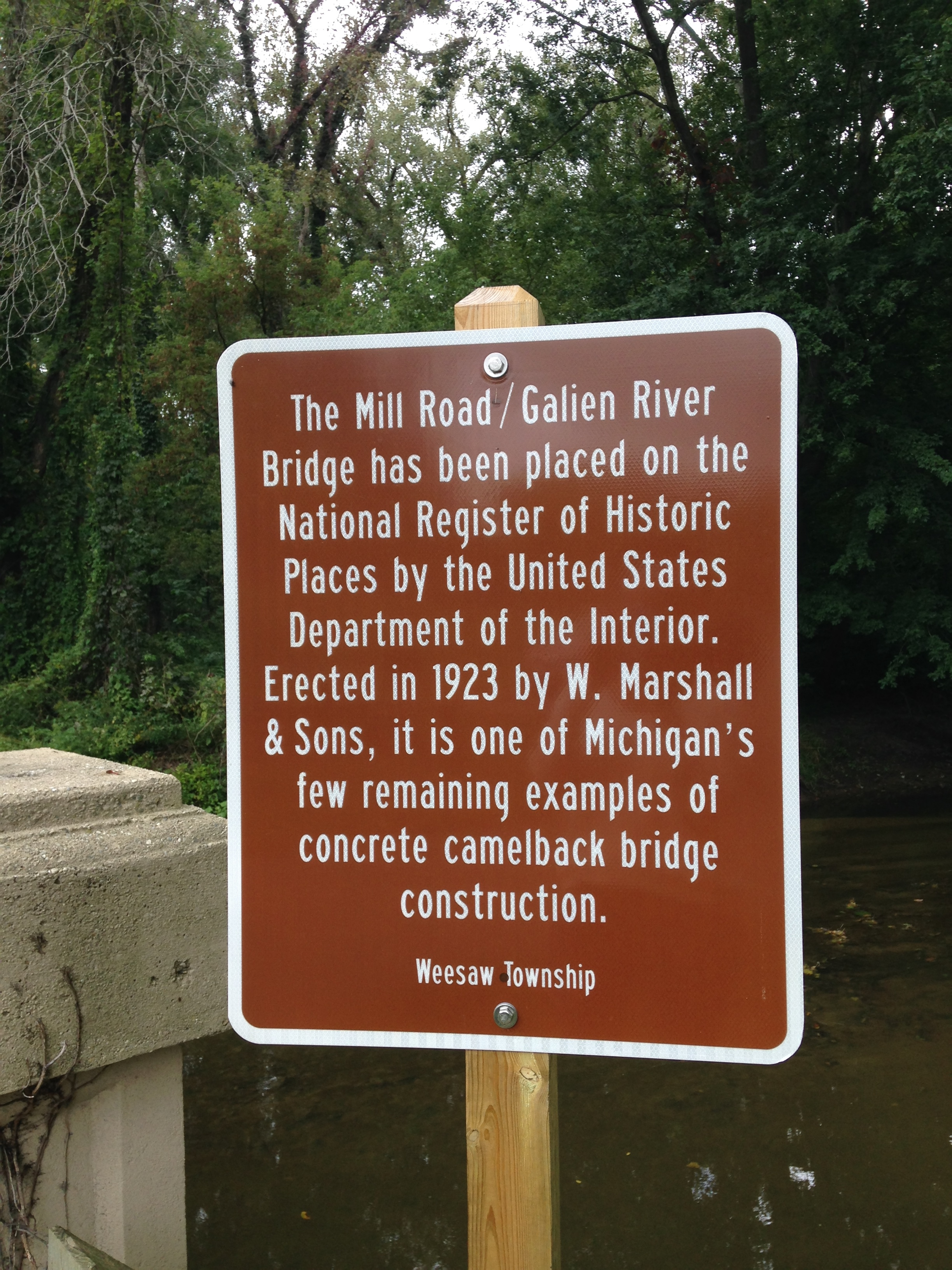

== Demographics ==
Historical population
Census	Pop.	Note	%±
2010	497		—
2020	483		−2.8%
U.S. Decennial Census
