= Lisa Brown (Michigan politician) =

American lawyer, politician (born 1967)

Oakland County Clerk/Register of Deeds
- Incumbent
- Assumed office January 1, 2013
- Preceded by: Bill Bullard Jr.

Member of the Michigan House of Representatives from the 39th district
- In office January 12, 2009 – January 14, 2012
- Preceded by: David Law
- Succeeded by: Klint Kesto

Personal details
- Born: January 26, 1967 (age 59) Royal Oak, Michigan, U.S.
- Party: Democratic
- Profession: Realtor, lawyer, politician
- Website: Official Website

Lisa Brown (born January 26, 1967) is an American attorney, realtor, and politician serving as the clerk and register of deeds of Oakland County, Michigan since 2013. A member of the Democratic Party, Brown previously served as a member of the Michigan House of Representatives, having represented the 39th State House District from 2009 to 2012. She was the Democratic nominee for lieutenant governor of Michigan in the 2014 election, alongside former Congressman Mark Schauer.

== Biography ==
Brown was born in Detroit, Michigan and graduated from Andover High School in Bloomfield Hills, Michigan in 1985. She received a BS in psychology from Michigan State University in 1989, and went on to earn her Juris Doctor from the Detroit College of Law in 1993. While at law school, she served as a clerk for two law firms. Brown practiced law for several years, handling probate issues. She then worked as a realtor with Max Broock Realtors in West Bloomfield Township.

Prior to her election, she served on the PTA of West Hills Middle School and Pine Lake Elementary School. She is Jewish and attends Adat Shalom, a Conservative Synagogue in Farmington Hills. She served on the region board of directors and is a life member of World ORT, a "non-profit non-governmental organization whose mission is the advancement of Jewish and other people through training and education". She also served on the executive board of directors of JARC.

== Political career ==
In 2006, Brown began a campaign as a Democrat for Michigan's 39th State House District, which was then held by Republican incumbent David Law. Brown was originally the underdog, especially as she had no prior electoral experience. On election day, however, she nearly scored an upset over Law, losing by only 181 votes (0.5%).

In 2008, Law decided not to run for a third term, instead unsuccessfully campaigning to become Oakland County Prosecutor.

Brown announced her intention to run for this 39th District again. Democrat John Kuriakuz challenged her in the Democratic primary. Brown emerged victorious with 57% of the vote. In the general election she faced Republican Walled Lake School Board President Amy Peterman. The 39th District includes all of Commerce Township and all but a small northern portion of West Bloomfield Township. Both parties spent heavily on the race, and Peterman was endorsed by the Detroit Free Press. On election day, Brown narrowly beat Peterman by a 51.6%-46.1% margin. She took office on January 1, 2009. She sat on the Education, Energy and Technology, Ethics and Elections, and Judiciary Committees. She authored a bill that banned the recreational drug benzylpiperazine.

In the November 2010 election, after an initial declaration of victory by her opponent, a review of the final tally was started. Her opponent, Lois Shulman, had declared victory before thousands of absentee ballots were counted. Ultimately, Brown prevailed by a margin of 86 votes (17,137 to 17,051).

Brown was elected county clerk and register of deeds on November 6, 2012, defeating Republican Willis C. Bullard, Jr., who had been appointed clerk in 2010 by the Oakland County Commissioners to fill a remainder term. Upon taking office, Brown became a defendant in a federal lawsuit, DeBoer v. Snyder, in which a lesbian couple, residents of Oakland County, are challenging Michigan's denial of adoption and marriage rights to same-sex couples. Named as a defendant because her office is responsible for issuing marriage licenses, she has supported the plaintiffs and expressed an eagerness to issue marriage licenses to same-sex couples as soon as the law allows.

=== 2012 abortion debate dispute ===
In June 2012, Michigan House Republicans prevented Brown from speaking on the floor in a debate about abortion legislation after she invoked her Jewish faith as a point of debate on the subject and concluded by saying, "Mr. Speaker, I'm flattered that you're all so interested in my vagina, but no means no." Majority Floor Leader Jim Stamas, R-Midland, determined Brown's comments violated the decorum of the House and barred her from speaking for a one-day period. Brown was gaveled off the floor and prohibited from speaking along with Representative Barb Byrum, who proposed a ban on vasectomies. Democrats called the incident evidence that Republicans were trampling on women's rights, with Senator Gretchen Whitmer saying "the war on women in Michigan is not fabricated – this is very real – and it comes at the highest levels of state government." On June 14, the Detroit News quoted Callton's take on Brown's comments. "What she said was offensive ... It was so offensive, I don't even want to say it in front of women. I would not say that in mixed company," he said. "It's just an extremely offensive statement." Callton, who is also Jewish, said he consulted his rabbi and believes Brown's interpretation of the Talmud as it relates to abortion is incorrect.

The bill that prompted Brown's comments was passed by a vote of 70–39, with one representative not voting.

==== Eurotophobia ====
Brown later stated: "I was either banned for being Jewish and rightfully pointing out that HB 5711 was forcing contradictory religious beliefs upon me and my religion. Or is it because I used the word 'vagina,' which is an anatomically, medically correct term?" On June 19, 2012, Representative Wayne Schmidt provided the GOP viewpoint, characterizing both of female representatives as "kids" who were "throwing temper tantrums" and in need of "time outs." House Speaker Jase Bolger stated that by referencing vagina, and then saying 'no means no', thereby making a rape reference, is inappropriate for legislative setting. Some commentators accused detractors of Lisa Brown's usage of the word vagina of being eurotophobic.

== Campaign for lieutenant governor ==
In an email to supporters on April 3, 2014, Mark Schauer announced his selection of Brown as his running mate for Lieutenant Governor of Michigan in the 2014 gubernatorial election.

== Electoral history ==
- 2016 election for Oakland County Clerk & Register of Deeds
  - Lisa Brown (D), 54%
  - Bill Bullard, Jr. (R), 45%
- 2014 election for Lieutenant Governor
  - Brian Calley (R), 51%
  - Lisa Brown (D), 47%
  - Scotty Boman (L), 1%
  - Richard Mendoza (T), 0.6%
  - Candace Caveny (G), 0.4%
- 2012 election for Oakland County Clerk & Register of Deeds
  - Lisa Brown (D), 53%
  - Bill Bullard, Jr. (R), 47%
- 2010 election for State House
  - Lisa Brown (D), 49.08%
  - Lois Shulman (R), 48.84%
  - Nathan Allen (L), 2.08%
- 2008 election for State House
  - Lisa Brown (D), 52%
  - Amy Peterman (R), 46%
- 2008 Democratic primary election for State House
  - Lisa Brown (D), 57%
  - John Kuriakuz (D), 43%
- 2006 election for State House
  - David Law (R), 50%
  - Lisa Brown (D), 50%

Party political offices
Preceded by Brenda Lawrence	Democratic nominee for Lieutenant Governor of Michigan; 2014	Succeeded by Garlin Gilchrist
