= Kim LaSata =

American politician (born 1963)

Member of the Michigan Senate from the 21st district
- In office January 1, 2019 – December 31, 2022
- Preceded by: John Proos
- Succeeded by: Sarah Anthony

Member of the Michigan House of Representatives from the 79th district
- In office January 1, 2017 – December 31, 2018
- Preceded by: Al Pscholka
- Succeeded by: Pauline Wendzel

Personal details
- Born: April 20, 1963 (age 63) St. Joseph, Michigan
- Party: Republican

Kim LaSata (born April 20, 1963) is an American politician who served in the Michigan Senate from the 21st district from 2019 to 2022.

== Education ==
LaSata earned a Bachelor of Science degree in education from Western Michigan University. She earned a master's degree in literacy studies from Western Michigan University.

== Career ==
On November 8, 2016, LaSata won the election and became a Republican member of the Michigan House of Representatives for District 79. LaSata defeated Marletta Seats and Carl G. Oehling with 58.78% of the votes. LaSata served in the Michigan House of Representatives until 2018.

On November 6, 2018, LaSata won the election and became a state senator of Michigan Senate for District 21. LaSata defeated Ian Haight with 58.13% of the votes.

== Personal life ==
LaSata's husband is Charlie. They have four children. LaSata and her family live in Bainbridge Township, Michigan.

== See also ==
- 2016 Michigan House of Representatives election
