= Paw Paw Lake, Michigan =

- Census-designated place (CDP) & unincorporated community
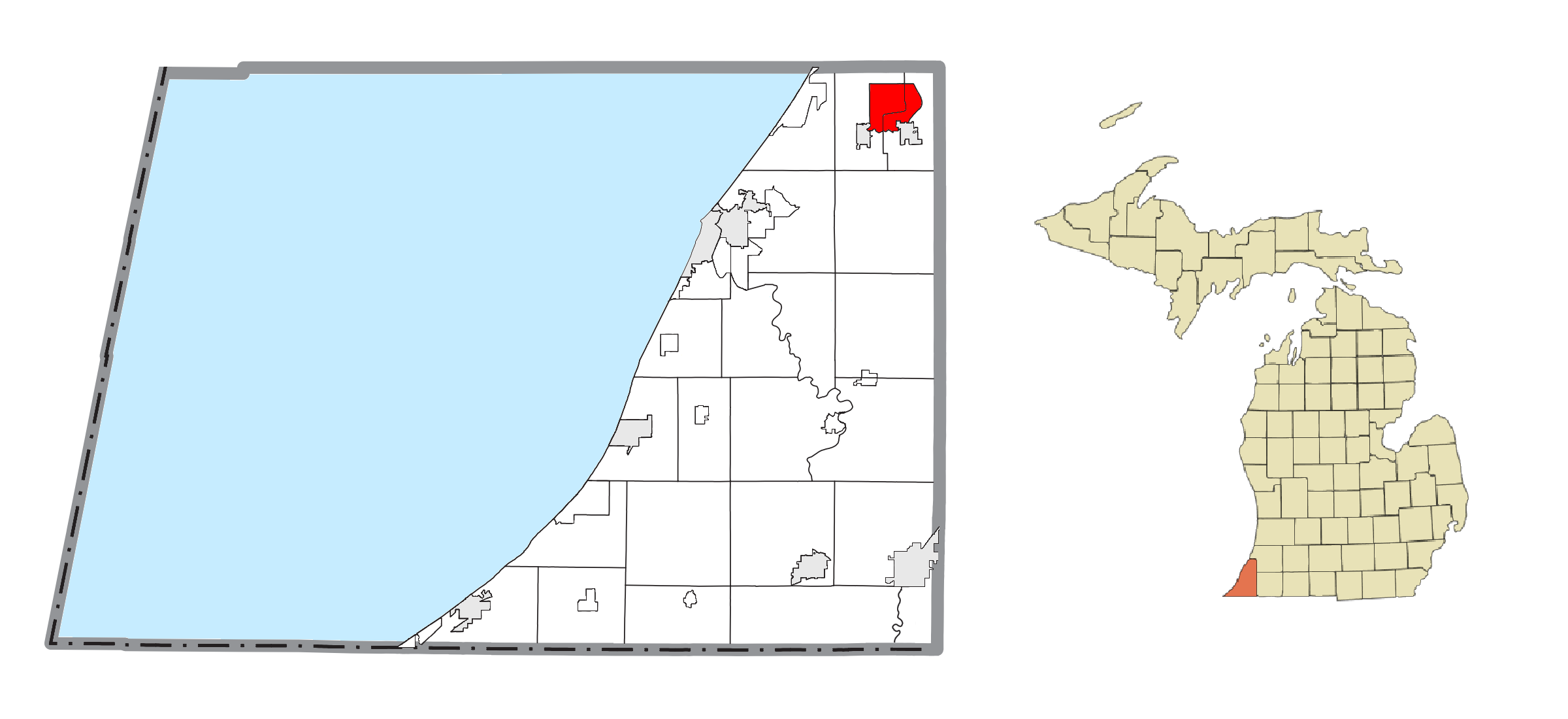
- Location within Berrien County

- Location within the state of Michigan Paw Paw Lake (the United States)
- Coordinates: 42°12′44″N 86°16′19″W
- Country: United States
- State: Michigan
- County: Berrien
- Townships: Coloma and Watervliet

Area
  - Total: 6.79 sq mi (17.59 km^{2})
  - Land: 5.13 sq mi (13.29 km^{2})
  - Water: 1.66 sq mi (4.29 km^{2})
- Elevation: 653 ft (199 m)

Population (2020)
  - Total: 3,323
  - Density: 650/sq mi (250/km^{2})
- Time zone: UTC-5 (Eastern (EST))
  - Summer (DST): UTC-4 (EDT)
- ZIP code(s): 49079
- Area code: 269
- FIPS code: 26-63020
- GNIS feature ID: 634490

Paw Paw Lake is an unincorporated community in Berrien County in the U.S. state of Michigan. It is a census-designated place (CDP) for statistical purposes, without legal status as a municipality. The community is located within areas of both Coloma Charter Township and Watervliet Township in the area surrounding Paw Paw Lake and Little Paw Paw Lake, excluding the cities of Watervliet and Coloma. The population of the CDP was 3,323 at the 2020 census.

== History ==
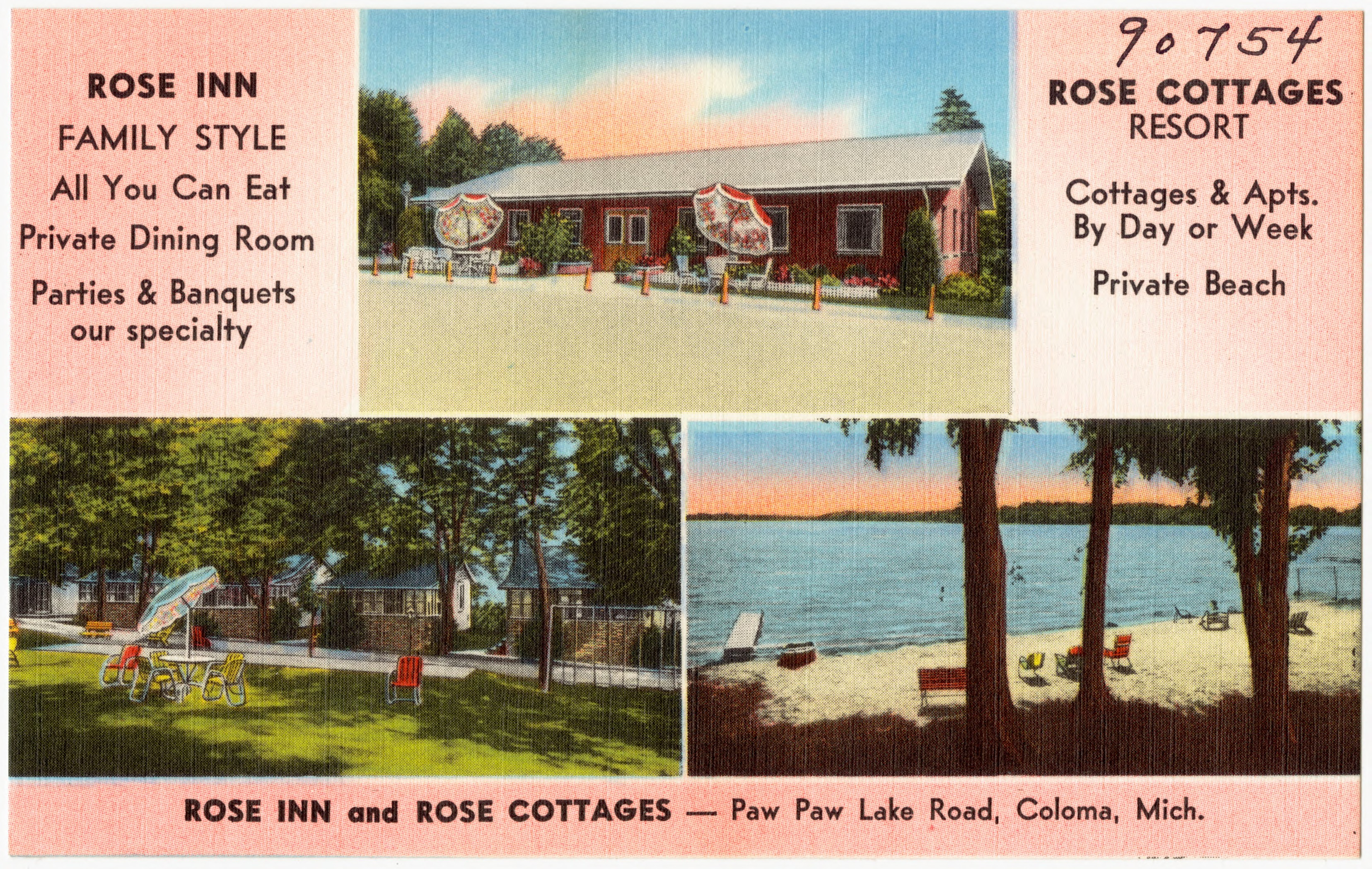
Postcard from the area, from the 1930s or 1940s

The area which became the CDP was the site of a tourist area in the early 20th century. An 1894 Chicago newspaper article was the catalyst in making the shore a resort area, and a rail line extension from nearby Coloma in 1896 started the building boom. Pavilions, hotels, and cottages soon followed, with nationally known acts performing at the pavilions. Most of these buildings no longer exist.

=== Deer Forest ===
The Deer Forest animal park in the CDP opened in 1949 at the end of the heyday of the resort area. By the 1952 season it hosted 200,000 visitors. It was owned by various owners throughout its existence; among the attractions were a ferris wheel and miniature train. After declining attendance, many of its assets were auctioned off on September 26, 2009, but the park continued to operate through the 2014 season. It closed permanently at the end of that season after a federal investigation and animals were dispersed to various other locations. The property itself was auctioned off on June 29, 2015. After sitting vacant, with a building fire in 2020, it was auctioned again in 2021 and sold in March 2022.

== Geography ==
According to the United States Census Bureau, the CDP has a total area of 6.8 square miles (17.5 km^{2}), of which 5.1 square miles (13.3 km^{2}) is land and 1.7 square miles (4.3 km^{2}), or 24.47%, is water, consisting primarily of Paw Paw Lake and Little Paw Paw Lake. The Paw Paw River, outlet of the lakes, forms most of the southern boundary of the CDP. North Coloma Road forms the western edge of the CDP, Hagar Shore Road the north edge, and highway M-140 the eastern edge. The cities of Watervliet and Coloma touch the CDP at its southeast and southwest corners, respectively.

== Demographics ==
Historical population
Census	Pop.	Note	%±
2000	3,944		—
2010	3,511		−11.0%
2020	3,323		−5.4%
U.S. Decennial Census

=== 2020 census ===
As of the 2020 census, Paw Paw Lake had a population of 3,323. The median age was 47.5 years. 17.7% of residents were under the age of 18 and 25.3% of residents were 65 years of age or older. For every 100 females there were 103.4 males, and for every 100 females age 18 and over there were 104.2 males age 18 and over.

89.8% of residents lived in urban areas, while 10.2% lived in rural areas.

There were 1,487 households in Paw Paw Lake, of which 24.6% had children under the age of 18 living in them. Of all households, 46.3% were married-couple households, 20.4% were households with a male householder and no spouse or partner present, and 25.4% were households with a female householder and no spouse or partner present. About 29.2% of all households were made up of individuals and 15.9% had someone living alone who was 65 years of age or older.

There were 2,335 housing units, of which 36.3% were vacant. The homeowner vacancy rate was 2.3% and the rental vacancy rate was 10.6%.

Racial composition as of the 2020 census
Race	Number	Percent
White	2,911	87.6%
Black or African American	37	1.1%
American Indian and Alaska Native	25	0.8%
Asian	23	0.7%
Native Hawaiian and Other Pacific Islander	1	0.0%
Some other race	50	1.5%
Two or more races	276	8.3%
Hispanic or Latino (of any race)	141	4.2%

=== 2000 census ===
As of the 2000 census, there were 3,944 people, 1,655 households, and 1,128 families residing in the CDP. The population density was 752.4 inhabitants per square mile (290.5/km^{2}). There were 2,363 housing units at an average density of 450.8 per square mile (174.1/km^{2}). The racial makeup of the CDP was 96.63% White, 0.58% Black or African American, 0.51% Native American, 0.68% Asian, 0.05% Pacific Islander, 0.20% from other races, and 1.34% from two or more races. Hispanic or Latino of any race were 1.37% of the population.

There were 1,655 households, out of which 27.2% had children under the age of 18 living with them, 54.3% were married couples living together, 11.1% had a female householder with no husband present, and 31.8% were non-families. 27.7% of all households were made up of individuals, and 11.5% had someone living alone who was 65 years of age or older. The average household size was 2.34 and the average family size was 2.83.

In the CDP, the population was spread out, with 22.4% under the age of 18, 7.0% from 18 to 24, 27.3% from 25 to 44, 27.1% from 45 to 64, and 16.2% who were 65 years of age or older. The median age was 40 years. For every 100 females, there were 95.7 males. For every 100 females age 18 and over, there were 93.4 males.

The median income for a household in the CDP was $38,216, and the median income for a family was $42,377. Males had a median income of $35,112 versus $20,833 for females. The per capita income for the CDP was $21,003. About 5.2% of families and 6.6% of the population were below the poverty line, including 9.5% of those under age 18 and 5.3% of those age 65 or over.
