= Klint Kesto =

American politician

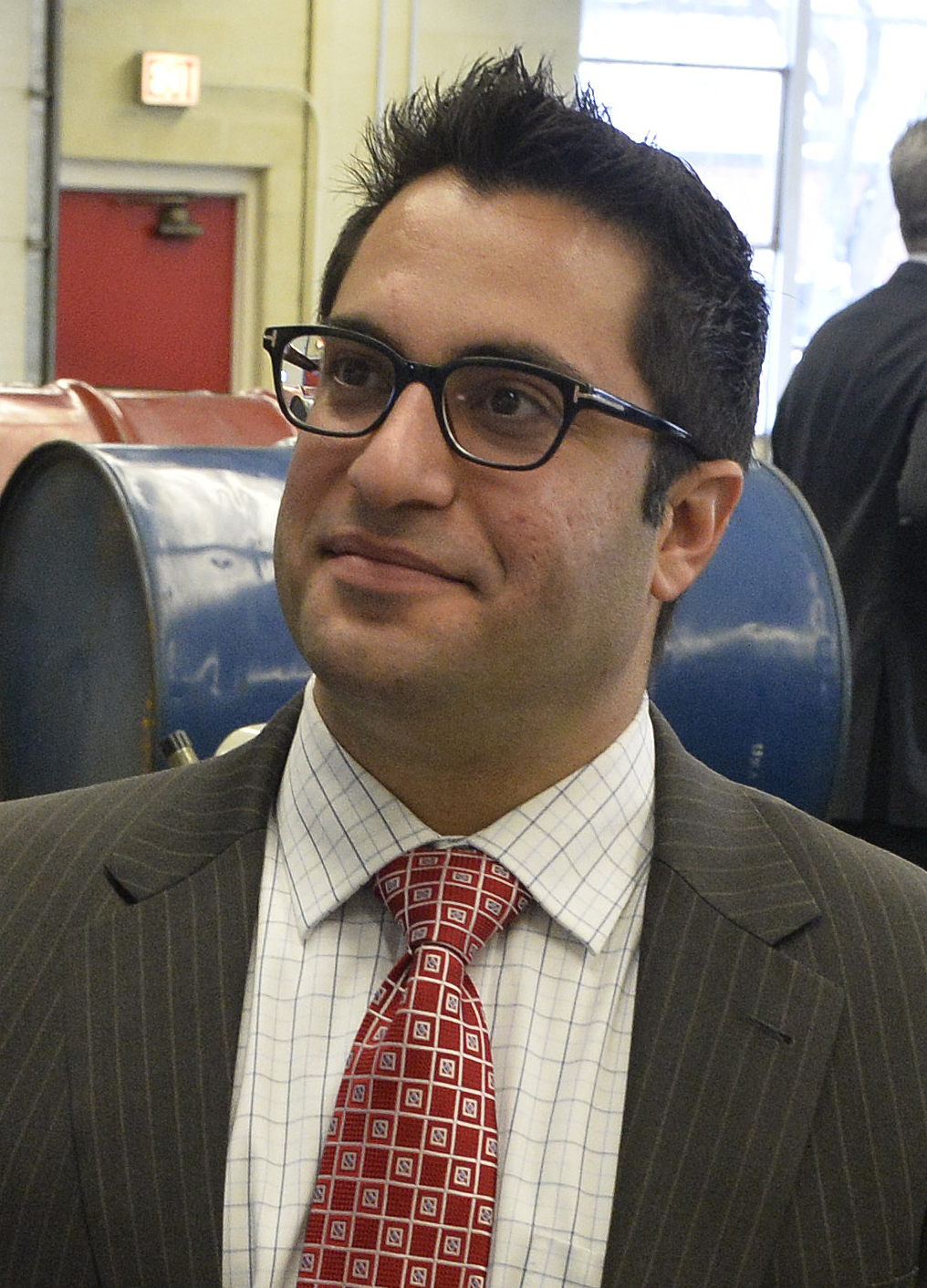

Member of the Michigan House of Representatives from the 39th district
- In office January 1, 2013 – 2018
- Preceded by: Lisa Brown
- Succeeded by: Ryan Berman

Personal details
- Party: Republican
- Education: University of Michigan (BA); Wayne State University (JD)
- Profession: Attorney

Klint Kesto is a former member of the Michigan House of Representatives representing a district primarily consisting of Wixom and Commerce Township.

Kesto has a bachelor's degree in political science from the University of Michigan and a Juris Doctor degree from Wayne State University. He worked as a staff attorney at the Wayne County Prosecutor’s office and also managed a family-owned restaurant shop before his election in 2012.

Kesto is a member of the Chaldean Catholic Church. He was the first Chaldean-Assyrian elected to the Michigan House of Representatives.
