= John Proos =

American politician

Member of the Michigan Senate from the 21st district
- In office January 1, 2011 – December 31, 2018
- Preceded by: Ron Jelinek
- Succeeded by: Kim LaSata

Member of the Michigan House of Representatives from the 79th district
- In office January 1, 2005 – December 31, 2010
- Preceded by: Charles LaSata
- Succeeded by: Al Pscholka

Personal details
- Born: December 10, 1969 (age 56)
- Party: Republican
- Spouse: Kristy Proos
- Profession: Public Servant

John Proos (born December 10, 1969) is a former Republican Senator who represented the 21st district in the Michigan Senate. He previously served as the representative for the 79th District in the Michigan House of Representatives.

== 2004 Election ==
Proos was elected to the Michigan Legislature as a state representative for the 79th Michigan House District, which covers Northern Berrien County. Having never held political office previously, Proos edged out Berrien County Administrator Bill Wolf (R) in the primary election, in what some considered a political upset, winning by just 400 votes of the 16,000 that were cast. Proos went on to easily win the general election against opponent Princella Tobias (D) earning over 60-percent of the total votes cast.

== 2006 Election ==
Janet King (D) ran against Proos in the 2006 election. Proos won 65% of the vote.

== 2008 Election ==
Jim Hahn (D) ran against Proos in the 2008 election. Proos won 59.29% of the vote.

== 2010 Election ==
After serving his maximum six-years as member of the Michigan House of Representatives, Proos announced in February 2010 that he would be seeking the 21st Michigan State Senate seat being vacated by Ron Jelinek who would not be seeking re-election because of the state's term limit laws. Proos defeated Todd Griffee (R) in the Republican primary by a landslide margin, earning 77-percent of the total votes cast. Proos had similar success in the general election against his opponent Scott Elliott (D), earning nearly two-thirds of the total votes cast. At the time of the elections, Michigan's 21st Senate District included communities in Berrien, Cass and most of Van Buren Counties.

== 2014 Election ==
Proos was easily re-elected to represent Michigan's 21st Senate District again earning nearly two-thirds of the total votes cast against his opponent Bette Piermann (D). Because of legislative redistricting, the boundaries of the 21st Senate District had changed to encompass all communities in Berrien, Cass and St. Joseph Counties.

== State representative ==
Proos served in the Michigan House of Representatives from 2005 - 2010 and was appointed to several House committees during his tenure. These included: Energy and Technology; Agriculture; Education; Senior Health, Security and Retirement and Appropriations.

During his time in the Michigan House, Proos was able to boast several accomplishments. As a member of the minority party, Proos introduced legislation that became law and was eventually known as Michigan's "cottage food" law. The law allows homemade goods to be sold at small operations such as farmer's markets as long as a visible label exists to inform consumers that the food was prepared in a cottage kitchen that had not been inspected by the Michigan Department of Agriculture.

Since its passage, the cottage food law has been credited for bolstering many home-based businesses and has come to personify Proos' political philosophy of "More Jobs, Less Government"

Proos' time in the Michigan House was also defined by his chairmanship of the Michigan House Republican Task Force on Jobs.
