= David Law (politician) =

American politician

Member of the Michigan House of Representatives from the 39th district
- In office 2004–2008
- Preceded by: Marc Shulman
- Succeeded by: Lisa Brown

Personal details
- Party: Republican
- Profession: Attorney

David Law is an American Republican politician who represented Michigan's 39th district in the Michigan House of Representatives from 2005 to 2008.

== Tenure ==
Law Served on the Judiciary, Commerce, Insurance, Transportation, and Government Operations committee

== Electoral history ==
2004 Michigan State House election in the 39th District (Oakland (Commerce Township, south West Bloomfield Township))
Party	Candidate	Votes	%
Republican	David Law	24,998	52.4
Democratic	Michael Schwartz	21,618	45.31
Libertarian	Nathan Allen	1,092	2.29
Total votes		47,708	100.0
Republican hold			

2006 Michigan State House election in the 39th District (Oakland (Commerce Township, south West Bloomfield Township))
Party	Candidate	Votes	%
Republican	David Law (incumbent)	19,566	50.23
Democratic	Lisa Brown	19,385	49.77
Total votes		38,951	100.0
Republican hold			

2008 Oakland County Prosecuting Attorney Election
Party	Candidate	Votes	%
Democratic	Jessica R. Cooper	331,881	54.78
Republican	David Law	269,547	44.49
Total votes		605,822	100.0
