= Coloma Charter Township, Michigan =

- Charter township
- logo

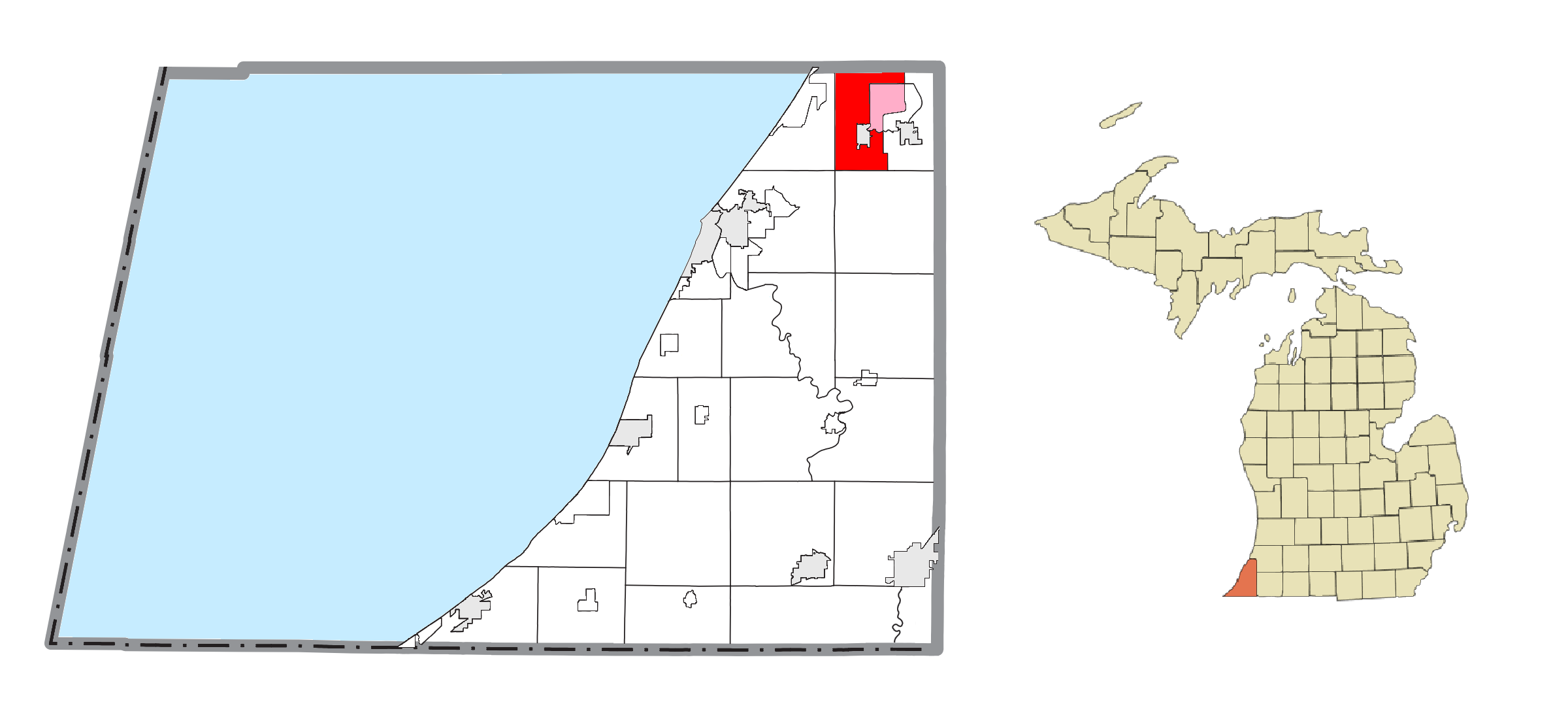
- Location within Berrien County (red) and an administered portion of the Paw Paw Lake community (pink)

- Location within the state of Michigan
- Coordinates: 42°12′12″N 86°17′39″W
- Country: United States
- State: Michigan
- County: Berrien

Area
  - Total: 19.1 sq mi (49.4 km^{2})
  - Land: 18.0 sq mi (46.5 km^{2})
  - Water: 1.1 sq mi (2.9 km^{2})
- Elevation: 660 ft (200 m)

Population (2020)
  - Total: 5,051
- Time zone: UTC-5 (Eastern (EST))
  - Summer (DST): UTC-4 (EDT)
- ZIP code(s): 49038, 49039
- Area code: 269
- FIPS code: 26-17340
- GNIS feature ID: 1626117
- Website: Official website

Coloma Charter Township is a charter township of Berrien County in the U.S. state of Michigan. The population was 5,051 at the 2020 census. The city of Coloma lies within the township.

The township is located in the north central portion of the county. Hagar Township is to the west, Covert Township of Van Buren County is to the north, Watervliet Township is to the east, Bainbridge Township is to the south, and Benton Charter Township to the southwest.

== Geography ==
According to the United States Census Bureau, the township has a total area of 19.1 square miles (49.4 km^{2}), of which 18.0 square miles (46.5 km^{2}) is land and 1.1 square miles (2.9 km^{2}), or 5.82%, is water.

I-94 passes through the south of the township. M-140 touches the northeast corner of the township before bending eastward around Paw Paw Lake. The eastern boundary of the township passes through the center of the lake. The census-designated place of Paw Paw Lake, Michigan, surrounds the lake and extends into Watervliet Township. The Paw Paw River flows through the south part of the township.

== Demographics ==
As of the census of 2000, there were 5,217 people, 2,111 households, and 1,481 families residing in the township. The population density was 286.3 inhabitants per square mile (110.5/km^{2}). There were 2,599 housing units at an average density of 142.6 per square mile (55.1/km^{2}). The racial makeup of the township was 96.53% White, 0.69% African American, 0.44% Native American, 0.59% Asian, 0.04% Pacific Islander, 0.52% from other races, and 1.19% from two or more races. Hispanic or Latino of any race were 2.59% of the population.

There were 2,111 households, out of which 29.9% had children under the age of 18 living with them, 56.5% were married couples living together, 10.4% had a female householder with no husband present, and 29.8% were non-families. 25.6% of all households were made up of individuals, and 11.2% had someone living alone who was 65 years of age or older. The average household size was 2.44 and the average family size was 2.90.

In the township the population was spread out, with 24.2% under the age of 18, 7.1% from 18 to 24, 28.4% from 25 to 44, 25.8% from 45 to 64, and 14.5% who were 65 years of age or older. The median age was 39 years. For every 100 females, there were 96.9 males. For every 100 females age 18 and over, there were 95.0 males.

The median income for a household in the township was $40,029, and the median income for a family was $44,859. Males had a median income of $36,231 versus $21,378 for females. The per capita income for the township was $20,377. About 4.0% of families and 5.4% of the population were below the poverty line, including 6.2% of those under age 18 and 2.7% of those age 65 or over.
