= Pauline Wendzel =

American politician

Member of the Michigan House of Representatives
- Incumbent
- Assumed office January 1, 2019
- Preceded by: Kim LaSata
- Constituency: 79th district (2019-2022); 39th district (2023-present)

Personal details
- Born: St. Joseph, Michigan
- Party: Republican
- Education: Michigan State University
- Occupation: Politician
- Website: Win With Wendzel

Pauline Joyce Wendzel is an American politician serving as a member of the Michigan House of Representatives since 2019, currently representing the 39th district. She is a member of the Republican Party.

== Early life ==
Wendzel was born in St. Joseph, Michigan. Wendzel's family are farmers in Bainbridge Township, Michigan. Wendzel graduated from Watervliet High School.

== Education ==
Wendzel earned a Bachelor of Arts degree in Anthropology and specializing in Food Industry management from Michigan State University.

== Career ==
In 2014, Wendzel became a programs director at North Berrien Historical Museum.

Wendzel served as the assistant deputy clerk for Bainbridge Township.

Wendzel was a product brand development manager at Coloma Frozen Foods.

On November 6, 2018, Wendzel won the election and became a member of Michigan House of Representatives for District 79. Wendzel defeated Joey B. Andrews with 55.68% of the votes. Wendzel sponsored a bill which gained bipartisan support, a bill that focused on expunging minor traffic violations.

In the 2022 Michigan House of Representatives election, Wendzel was redistricted to the 39th district, winning reelection there. She was reelected in 2024.

== Awards and recognitions ==
- 2019 40 Under 40. Presented by Moody on the Market.

== See also ==
- 2018 Michigan House of Representatives election

Political offices
Preceded by Kim LaSata	Michigan Representatives; 79th District; 2019–present	Succeeded by Incumbent
