= Coloma, Michigan =

- City
- Seal

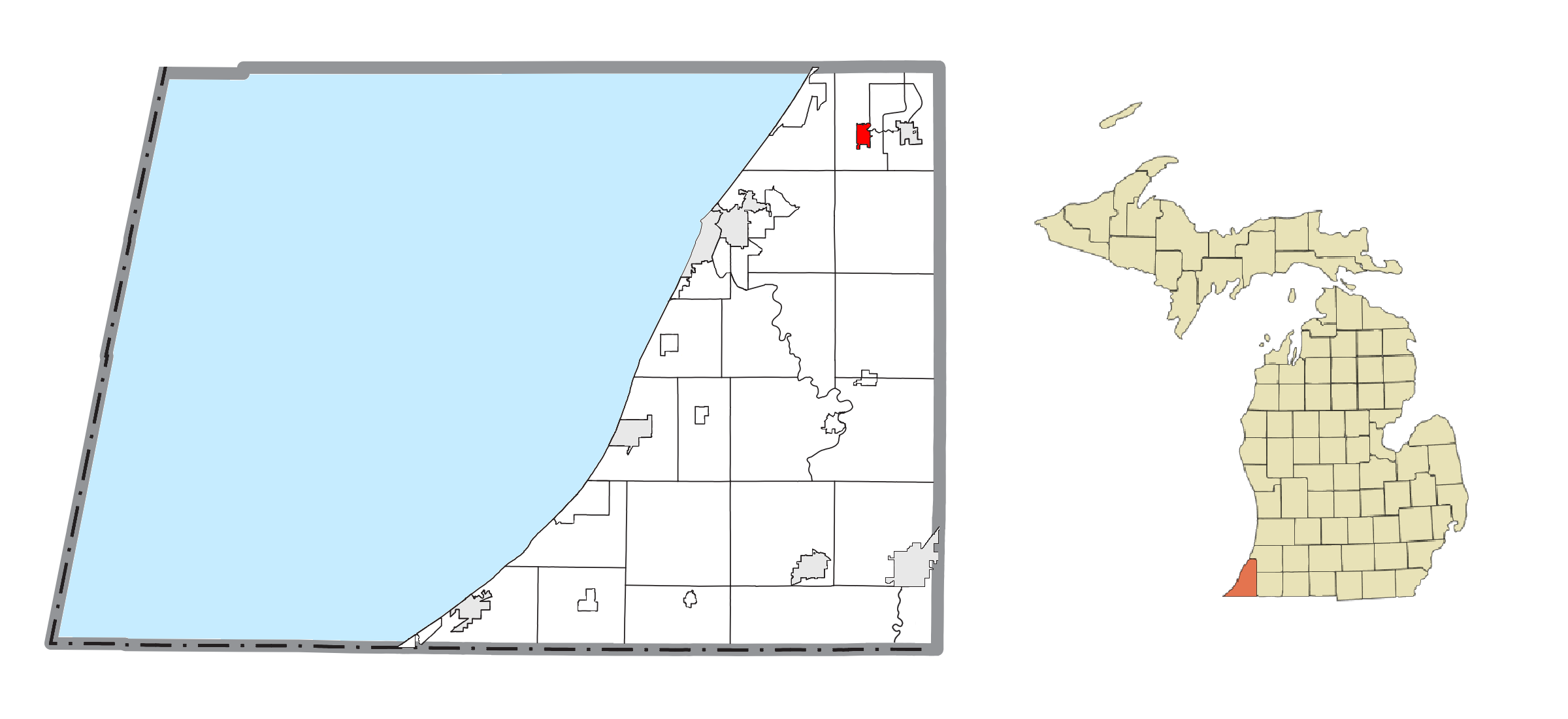
- Location within Berrien County

- Location within the state of Michigan
- Coordinates: 42°11′12″N 86°18′28″W
- Country: United States
- State: Michigan
- County: Berrien

Government
  - Type: City commission
  - Mayor: Marsha Hammond

Area
  - Total: 0.89 sq mi (2.30 km^{2})
  - Land: 0.89 sq mi (2.30 km^{2})
  - Water: 0 sq mi (0.00 km^{2})
- Elevation: 669 ft (204 m)

Population (2020)
  - Total: 1,465
  - Density: 1,649.7/sq mi (636.97/km^{2})
- Time zone: UTC-5 (Eastern (EST))
  - Summer (DST): UTC-4 (EDT)
- ZIP code(s): 49038, 49039
- Area code: 269
- FIPS code: 26-17320
- GNIS feature ID: 0623623
- Website: Official website

Coloma is a city in Berrien County in the U.S. state of Michigan. The population was 1,465 at the 2020 census.

== History ==
Coloma was incorporated as a village in 1893 and as a city in 1941.

== Geography ==
According to the United States Census Bureau, the city has a total area of 0.89 square miles (2.31 km^{2}), all land.

Rich farmland in the area made temperate by Lake Michigan is called the Fruit Belt, and Coloma is located in the Lake Michigan Shore American Viticultural Area.

Coloma is near the former resort area of Paw Paw Lake.

== Demographics ==
Historical population
Census	Pop.	Note	%±
1900	687		—
1910	701		2.0%
1920	663		−5.4%
1930	826		24.6%
1940	960		16.2%
1950	1,041		8.4%
1960	1,473		41.5%
1970	1,814		23.2%
1980	1,833		1.0%
1990	1,679		−8.4%
2000	1,595		−5.0%
2010	1,483		−7.0%
2020	1,465		−1.2%
U.S. Decennial Census

=== 2010 census ===
As of the census of 2010, there were 1,483 people, 606 households, and 398 families living in the city. The population density was 1,666.3 inhabitants per square mile (643.4/km^{2}). There were 667 housing units at an average density of 749.4 per square mile (289.3/km^{2}). The racial makeup of the city was 93.5% White, 1.2% African American, 0.5% Native American, 1.1% Asian, 1.7% from other races, and 2.1% from two or more races. Hispanic or Latino of any race were 3.9% of the population.

There were 606 households, of which 32.2% had children under the age of 18 living with them, 44.7% were married couples living together, 14.7% had a female householder with no husband present, 6.3% had a male householder with no wife present, and 34.3% were non-families. 28.7% of all households were made up of individuals, and 8.8% had someone living alone who was 65 years of age or older. The average household size was 2.44 and the average family size was 3.00.

The median age in the city was 38.6 years. 24.6% of residents were under the age of 18; 8.7% were between the ages of 18 and 24; 25.1% were from 25 to 44; 27% were from 45 to 64; and 14.5% were 65 years of age or older. The gender makeup of the city was 48.9% male and 51.1% female.

=== 2000 census ===
As of the census of 2000, there were 1,595 people, 626 households, and 446 families living in the city. The population density was 1,766.9 inhabitants per square mile (682.2/km^{2}). There were 675 housing units at an average density of 747.7 per square mile (288.7/km^{2}). The racial makeup of the city was 96.61% White, 1.13% African American, 0.38% Native American, 0.31% Asian, 0.25% from other races, and 1.32% from two or more races. Hispanic or Latino of any race were 1.32% of the population.

There were 626 households, out of which 35.3% had children under the age of 18 living with them, 54.2% were married couples living together, 13.7% had a female householder with no husband present, and 28.6% were non-families. 24.8% of all households were made up of individuals, and 12.9% had someone living alone who was 65 years of age or older. The average household size was 2.55 and the average family size was 3.03.

In the city, the population was spread out, with 28.2% under the age of 18, 6.0% from 18 to 24, 29.0% from 25 to 44, 22.7% from 45 to 64, and 14.1% who were 65 years of age or older. The median age was 37 years. For every 100 females, there were 89.2 males. For every 100 females age 18 and over, there were 83.2 males.

The median income for a household in the city was $38,882, and the median income for a family was $46,042. Males had a median income of $36,681 versus $21,397 for females. The per capita income for the city was $17,714. About 5.9% of families and 8.9% of the population were below the poverty line, including 7.2% of those under age 18 and 8.6% of those age 65 or over.

== Arts and culture ==
The Glad-Peach Festival is held in Coloma every August.

== Infrastructure ==
=== Major highways ===
- I-94
