= Watervliet, Michigan =

- City
- logo

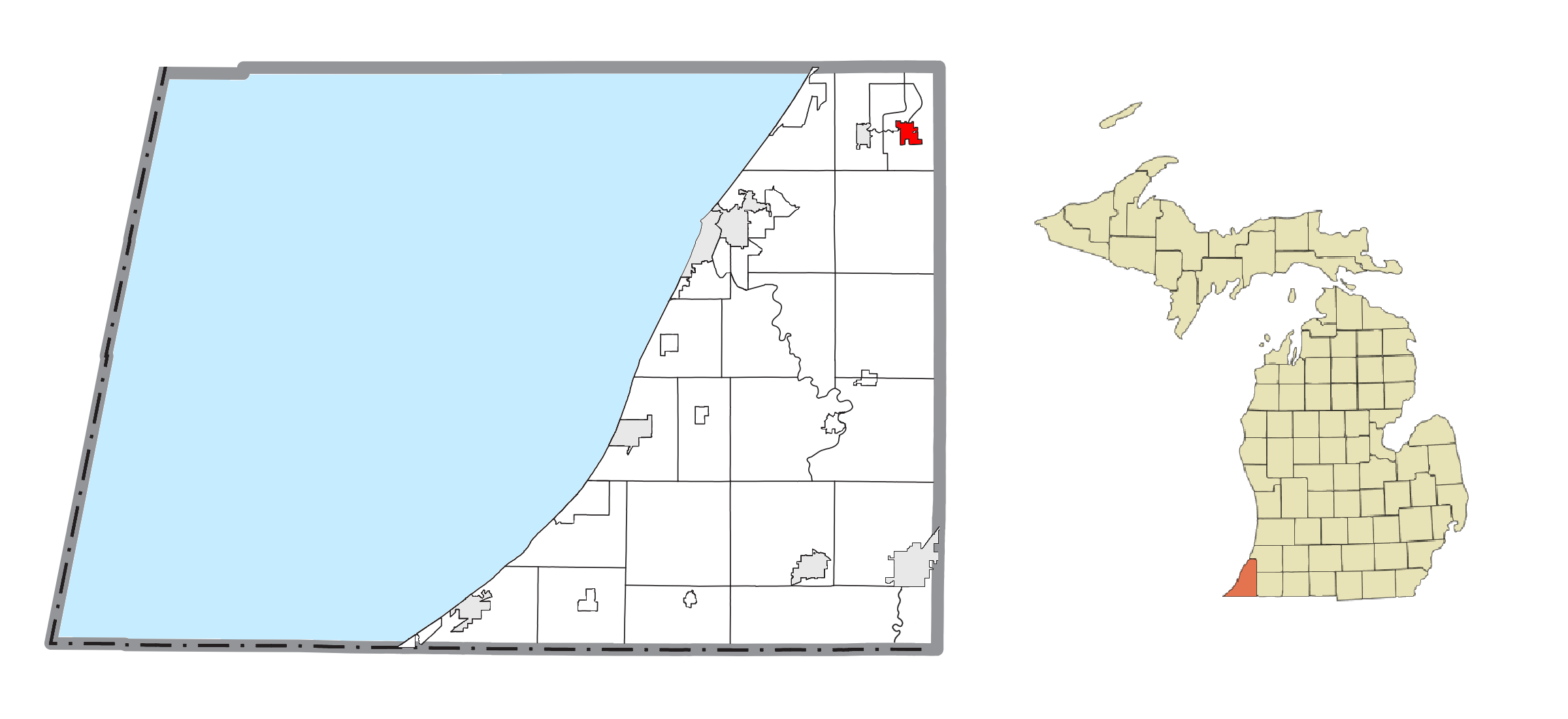
- Location within Berrien County

- Location within the state of Michigan
- Coordinates: 42°11′11″N 86°15′39″W
- Country: United States
- State: Michigan
- County: Berrien

Government
  - Mayor: Deah Muth

Area
  - Total: 1.21 sq mi (3.14 km^{2})
  - Land: 1.18 sq mi (3.06 km^{2})
  - Water: 0.035 sq mi (0.09 km^{2})
- Elevation: 646 ft (197 m)

Population (2020)
  - Total: 1,669
  - Density: 1,414/sq mi (546.1/km^{2})
- Time zone: UTC-5 (Eastern (EST))
  - Summer (DST): UTC-4 (EDT)
- ZIP code(s): 49098
- Area code: 269
- FIPS code: 26-84500
- GNIS feature ID: 1615862
- Website: www.watervliet.org

Watervliet is a city in Berrien County in the U.S. state of Michigan. Located in the northeastern part of the county, the population was 1,669 at the 2020 census. Mostly a rural farming community. The city is surrounded by Watervliet Charter Township but is administered autonomously. “Watervliet” means “flowing water” in Dutch, coming from “water” and “vliet” "Vliet" is a Dutch word for a minor streaming water, though it may refer to a city canal or a river that connects such flows.

== History ==
In 1905, John Olsen and Maud Nelson moved here where they established a women's baseball team. Both of them had experience in the game. The "Cherokee Indian Baseball Team" set out in its Pullman car in the same year complete with an electric light facility, a grand stand and a 12 by 1200 foot fence. Nelson, who was born in Italy, was on the team. She was billed by her husband, Olsen, as the undisputed women's champion pitcher of the world.

== Geography ==
According to the United States Census Bureau, the city has a total area of 1.23 square miles (3.19 km^{2}), of which 1.19 square miles (3.08 km^{2}) is land and 0.04 square miles (0.10 km^{2}) is water.

== Demographics ==
Historical population
Census	Pop.	Note	%±
1880	179		—
1900	717		—
1910	728		1.5%
1920	1,073		47.4%
1930	1,207		12.5%
1940	1,193		−1.2%
1950	1,327		11.2%
1960	1,818		37.0%
1970	2,059		13.3%
1980	1,867		−9.3%
1990	1,867		0.0%
2000	1,843		−1.3%
2010	1,735		−5.9%
2020	1,669		−3.8%
U.S. Decennial Census

=== 2020 census ===
As of the 2020 census, Watervliet had a population of 1,669. The median age was 38.8 years. 24.3% of residents were under the age of 18 and 18.3% of residents were 65 years of age or older. For every 100 females there were 94.5 males, and for every 100 females age 18 and over there were 96.1 males age 18 and over.

92.8% of residents lived in urban areas, while 7.2% lived in rural areas.

There were 671 households in Watervliet, of which 32.6% had children under the age of 18 living in them. Of all households, 40.5% were married-couple households, 20.6% were households with a male householder and no spouse or partner present, and 29.2% were households with a female householder and no spouse or partner present. About 30.2% of all households were made up of individuals and 18.2% had someone living alone who was 65 years of age or older.

There were 721 housing units, of which 6.9% were vacant. The homeowner vacancy rate was 0.9% and the rental vacancy rate was 2.6%.

Racial composition as of the 2020 census
Race	Number	Percent
White	1,364	81.7%
Black or African American	23	1.4%
American Indian and Alaska Native	32	1.9%
Asian	11	0.7%
Native Hawaiian and Other Pacific Islander	1	0.1%
Some other race	71	4.3%
Two or more races	167	10.0%
Hispanic or Latino (of any race)	156	9.3%

=== 2010 census ===
As of the census of 2010, there were 1,735 people, 677 households, and 448 families living in the city. The population density was 1,458.0 inhabitants per square mile (562.9/km^{2}). There were 752 housing units at an average density of 631.9 per square mile (244.0/km^{2}). The racial makeup of the city was 94.3% White, 1.0% African American, 0.8% Native American, 0.2% Asian, 1.0% from other races, and 2.7% from two or more races. Hispanic or Latino of any race were 3.9% of the population.

There were 677 households, of which 38.1% had children under the age of 18 living with them, 43.7% were married couples living together, 14.8% had a female householder with no husband present, 7.7% had a male householder with no wife present, and 33.8% were non-families. 28.7% of all households were made up of individuals, and 13.5% had someone living alone who was 65 years of age or older. The average household size was 2.55 and the average family size was 3.11.

The median age in the city was 35.8 years. 27.9% of residents were under the age of 18; 8.2% were between the ages of 18 and 24; 26.1% were from 25 to 44; 26.2% were from 45 to 64; and 11.6% were 65 years of age or older. The gender makeup of the city was 47.9% male and 52.1% female.

=== 2000 census ===
As of the census of 2000, there were 1,843 people, 719 households, and 473 families living in the city. The population density was 1,495.9 inhabitants per square mile (577.6/km^{2}). There were 760 housing units at an average density of 616.9 per square mile (238.2/km^{2}). The racial makeup of the city was 97.40% White, 0.33% African American, 0.22% Native American, 0.49% Asian, 0.38% from other races, and 1.19% from two or more races. Hispanic or Latino of any race were 1.09% of the population.

There were 719 households, out of which 36.0% had children under the age of 18 living with them, 44.6% were married couples living together, 15.9% had a female householder with no husband present, and 34.2% were non-families. 28.5% of all households were made up of individuals, and 16.0% had someone living alone who was 65 years of age or older. The average household size was 2.55 and the average family size was 3.09.

In the city, the population was spread out, with 29.0% under the age of 18, 8.0% from 18 to 24, 30.3% from 25 to 44, 19.2% from 45 to 64, and 13.6% who were 65 years of age or older. The median age was 35 years. For every 100 females, there were 88.8 males. For every 100 females age 18 and over, there were 83.6 males.

The median income for a household in the city was $38,681, and the median income for a family was $42,391. Males had a median income of $37,500 versus $21,250 for females. The per capita income for the city was $16,691. About 3.8% of families and 6.9% of the population were below the poverty line, including 6.9% of those under age 18 and 11.5% of those age 65 or over.

== Education ==
Watervliet is home to six schools and the Watervliet Public Schools. The six schools are as follows:

- Watervliet High School
- South Elementary School
- North Elementary School
- Watervliet Middle School
- St. Joseph Catholic School (Closed in 2015)
- Grace Christian School

== See also ==
- List of cities in Michigan
