= Watervliet Township, Michigan =

- Charter township
- Watervliet Charter Township
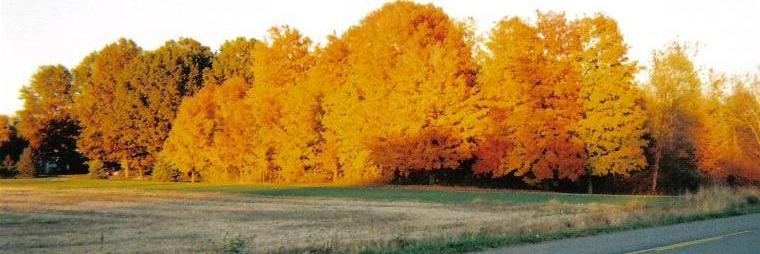
- Rural area along Dan Smith Road

- logo

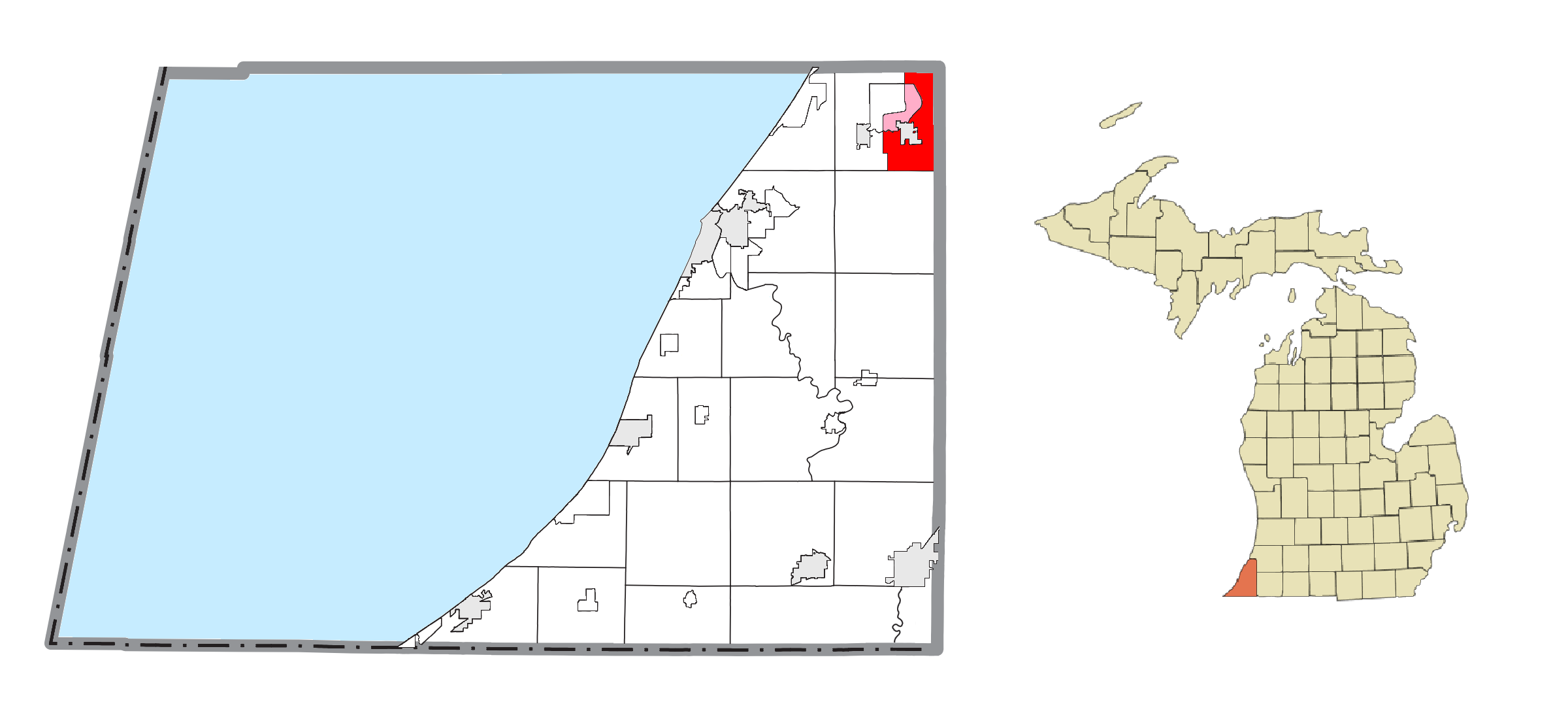
- Location within Berrien County (red) and an administered portion of the Paw Paw Lake community (pink)

- Location within the state of Michigan Location within the United States
- Coordinates: 42°12′00″N 86°15′24″W
- Country: United States
- State: Michigan
- County: Berrien
- Established: 1833

Area
  - Total: 14.49 sq mi (37.5 km^{2})
  - Land: 13.47 sq mi (34.9 km^{2})
  - Water: 1.02 sq mi (2.6 km^{2})
- Elevation: 660 ft (200 m)

Population (2020)
  - Total: 3,036
  - Density: 225.4/sq mi (87.02/km^{2})
- Time zone: UTC-5 (Eastern (EST))
  - Summer (DST): UTC-4 (EDT)
- ZIP code(s): 49098 (Watervliet)
- Area code: 269
- FIPS code: 26-84520
- GNIS feature ID: 1627225
- Website: Official website

Watervliet Charter Township is a charter township of Berrien County in the U.S. state of Michigan. The population was 3,036 at the 2020 census.

== Communities ==
The township surrounds the city of Watervliet, but the two are administered autonomously. The township also contains a portion of the Paw Paw Lake community.

== History ==
The township originally included the area of Coloma Township, which separated in 1917.

== Geography ==
According to the United States Census Bureau, Watervliet Township has a total area of 14.49 square miles (37.53 km^{2}), of which 13.47 square miles (34.89 km^{2}) is land and 1.02 square miles (2.64 km^{2}) (7.04%) is water.

The largest water body in the township is Paw Paw Lake, shared with Coloma Township. The census-designated place of Paw Paw Lake consists of housing developments that surround the lake with both townships.

== Demographics ==
As of the census of 2000, there were 3,392 people, 1,348 households, and 939 families residing in the township. The population density was 248.7 inhabitants per square mile (96.0/km^{2}). There were 1,724 housing units at an average density of 126.4 per square mile (48.8/km^{2}). The racial makeup of the township was 93.66% White, 1.71% African American, 0.88% Native American, 0.32% Asian, 2.27% from other races, and 1.15% from two or more races. Hispanic or Latino of any race were 4.22% of the population.

There were 1,348 households, out of which 30.5% had children under the age of 18 living with them, 53.9% were married couples living together, 11.6% had a female householder with no husband present, and 30.3% were non-families. 25.8% of all households were made up of individuals, and 11.4% had someone living alone who was 65 years of age or older. The average household size was 2.46 and the average family size was 2.93.

In the township the population was spread out, with 25.6% under the age of 18, 8.5% from 18 to 24, 27.2% from 25 to 44, 24.5% from 45 to 64, and 14.3% who were 65 years of age or older. The median age was 37 years. For every 100 females, there were 92.7 males. For every 100 females age 18 and over, there were 90.8 males.

The median income for a household in the township was $39,152, and the median income for a family was $45,709. Males had a median income of $35,842 versus $22,500 for females. The per capita income for the township was $22,134. About 7.8% of families and 10.5% of the population were below the poverty line, including 12.0% of those under age 18 and 9.6% of those age 65 or over.
