= Michigan's 78th House of Representatives district =

American legislative district

Michigan's 78th State House of Representatives district
Representative
Gina Johnsen; R–Odessa Township
- Demographics: 87.6% White; 2.4% Black; 4.3% Hispanic; 0.4% Asian; 0.4% Native American; 0.3% Other; 4.6% Multiracial
- Population (2024): 92,597

Michigan's 78th House of Representatives district (also referred to as Michigan's 78th House district) is a legislative district within the Michigan House of Representatives located in parts of Barry, Eaton, Ionia, and Kent counties. The district was created in 1965, when the Michigan House of Representatives district naming scheme changed from a county-based system to a numerical one.

== List of representatives ==
Representative	Party	Dates	Residence	Notes
Roy L. Spencer	Republican	1965–1976	Attica	
Larry E. Burkhalter	Democratic	1977–1980	Lapeer	
John Gregory Strand	Republican	1981–1982	Lapeer	
Keith Muxlow	Republican	1983–1992	Brown City	
Carl Gnodtke	Republican	1993–1996	Sawyer	
Ron Jelinek	Republican	1997–2002	Three Oaks	
Neal Nitz	Republican	2003–2008	Baroda	
Sharon Tyler	Republican	2009–2012	Niles	
Dave Pagel	Republican	2013–2018	Berrien Springs	
Brad Paquette	Republican	2019–2022	Niles	
Gina Johnsen	Republican	2023–present	Odessa Township	Lived in Lake Odessa until around 2024.
Brandon Strong	Republican	(Note: Member-elect.)	Hastings	

== Recent elections ==
=== 2020s ===
2026 Michigan House of Representatives election
Party	Candidate	Votes	%
Republican	Brandon L. Strong	24,212	59.77
Democratic	Rachel Gross	15,296	37.76
Libertarian	Ben DeJong	1,003	2.48
Total votes		40,511	100
Republican hold			

2024 Michigan House of Representatives election
Party	Candidate	Votes	%
Republican	Gina Johnsen	33,508	68.6
Democratic	Christine Terpening	15,344	31.4
Total votes		48,852	100
Republican hold			

2022 Michigan House of Representatives election
Party	Candidate	Votes	%
Republican	Gina Johnsen	25,765	65.6
Democratic	Leah Groves	13,533	34.4
Total votes		39,298	100
Republican hold			

2020 Michigan House of Representatives election
Party	Candidate	Votes	%
Republican	Brad Paquette	28,485	62.7
Democratic	Dan VandenHeede	16,297	35.9
Natural Law	Andrew Warner	638	1.4
Total votes		45,420	100
Republican hold			

2018 Michigan House of Representatives election
Party	Candidate	Votes	%
Republican	Brad Paquette	20,596	61.4
Democratic	Dean E. Hill	12,978	38.7
Total votes		33,574	100
Republican hold			

2016 Michigan House of Representatives election
Party	Candidate	Votes	%
Republican	Dave Pagel	26,037	67.5
Democratic	Dean Hill	12,529	32.5
Total votes		38,566	100
Republican hold			

2014 Michigan House of Representatives election
Party	Candidate	Votes	%
Republican	Dave Pagel	15,360	67.2
Democratic	Cartier Shields	7,488	32.8
Total votes		22,848	100
Republican hold			

2012 Michigan House of Representatives election
Party	Candidate	Votes	%
Republican	Dave Pagel	23,227	61.1
Democratic	Jack Arbanas	14,802	38.9
Total votes		38,029	100
Republican hold			

2010 Michigan House of Representatives election
Party	Candidate	Votes	%
Republican	Sharon Tyler	15,218	65.4
Democratic	Cindy Ellis	8,070	34.7
Total votes		23,288	100
Republican hold			

2008 Michigan House of Representatives election
Party	Candidate	Votes	%
Republican	Sharon Tyler	20,226	52.1
Democratic	Judy Truesdell	18,623	47.9
Total votes		38,849	100
Republican hold			

== Historical district boundaries ==
Map	Description	Apportionment Plan	Notes
	Huron County (part): Brookfield Township; Fairhaven Township; Grant Township; Oliver Township; Sebewaing Township; Winsor Township; Lapeer County Tuscola County (part): Almer Township; Columbia Township; Dayton Township; Elkland Township; Ellington Township; Fremont Township; Kingston Township; Koylton Township; Millington Township; Novesta Township; Watertown Township; Wells Township	1964 Apportionment Plan	
	Lapeer County (part): Excluding; Burlington Township; Burnside Township; Goodland Township; Rich Township; Macomb County (part): Armada Township; Bruce Township (part); Memphis (part); St. Clair County (part): Excluding; Algonac; Brockway Township; Burtchville Township; Casco Township; China Township; Clay Township; Cottrellville Township; East China Township; Grant Township; Ira Township; Kimball Township (part); Lynn Township; Marine City; Marysville; New Baltimore (part); Port Huron; Port Huron Township; St. Clair; St. Clair Township; Yale	1972 Apportionment Plan	
	Sanilac County St. Clair County (part): Burtchville Township; Clyde Township; Fort Gratiot Township; Port Huron	1982 Apportionment Plan	
	Berrien County (part): Baroda Township; Berrien Township; Bertrand Township; Bridgman; Buchanan; Buchanan Township; Chikaming Township; Galien Township; Lake Charter Township; New Buffalo; New Buffalo Township; Niles; Niles Charter Township; Oronoko Charter Township; Pipestone Township; Royalton Township; Sodus Township; Three Oaks Township; Weesaw Township	1992 Apportionment Plan	
	Berrien County (part): Baroda Township; Berrien Township; Bertrand Township; Buchanan; Buchanan Township; Chikaming Township; Galien Township; New Buffalo; New Buffalo Township; Niles (part); Niles Charter Township; Oronoko Charter Township; Pipestone Township; Three Oaks Township; Weesaw Township; Cass County: Dowagiac; Howard Township; LaGrange Township (part); Niles (part); Silver Creek Township; Wayne Township	2001 Apportionment Plan	
	Berrien County (part): Baroda Township; Berrien Township; Bertrand Township; Buchanan; Buchanan Township; Chikaming Township; Galien Township; New Buffalo; New Buffalo Township; Niles (part); Niles Charter Township; Oronoko Charter Township; Pipestone Township; Sodus Township; Three Oaks Township; Weesaw Township; Cass County: Howard Township; Milton Township; Niles (part); Ontwa Township; Silver Creek Township	2011 Apportionment Plan	
