= Chain Lake =

Chain Lake may refer to:

- Chain Lake (Michigan), a lake in Mackinac County
- Chain Lake (Minnesota), a lake in Chisago County
- Chain Lake, Washington, a census-designated place

== See also ==
- Chain O'Lakes
- Chain of Lakes (disambiguation)
