= Galien Township, Michigan =

- Civil township
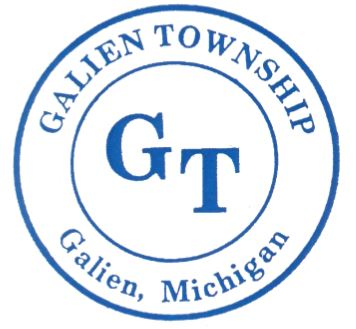
- Seal

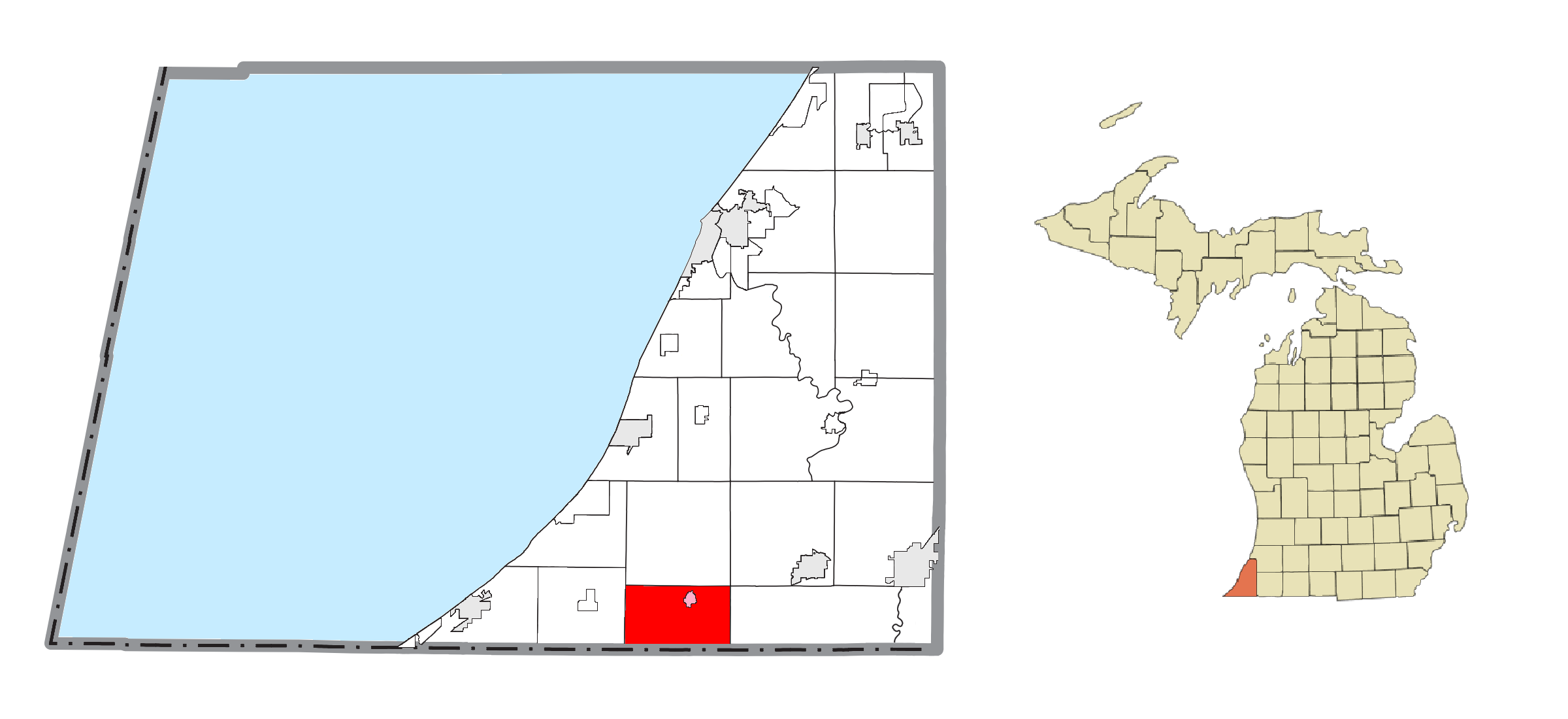
- Location within Berrien County (red) and the administered village of Galien (pink)

- Location within the state of Michigan Galien Township (the United States)
- Coordinates: 41°47′00″N 86°31′00″W
- Country: United States
- State: Michigan
- County: Berrien

Area
  - Total: 22.0 sq mi (57.1 km^{2})
  - Land: 22.0 sq mi (56.9 km^{2})
  - Water: 0.077 sq mi (0.2 km^{2})
- Elevation: 720 ft (220 m)

Population (2020)
  - Total: 1,412
- Time zone: UTC-5 (Eastern (EST))
  - Summer (DST): UTC-4 (EDT)
- ZIP code(s): 49113
- Area code: 269
- FIPS code: 26-31320
- GNIS feature ID: 1626331
- Website: Official website

Galien Township is a civil township of Berrien County in the U.S. state of Michigan. As of the 2020 census, the township population was 1,412. The village of Galien is located within the township.

The township is in the south central portion of the county. Three Oaks Township is to the west and northwest, Weesaw Township to the north, Buchanan Township to the northeast, and Bertrand Township to the east. Indiana is to the south, with Olive Township in St. Joseph County to the southeast and Hudson Township in LaPorte County to the southwest.

== Geography ==
According to the United States Census Bureau, Galien Township has a total area of 22.0 square miles (57.1 km^{2}), of which 22.0 square miles (56.9 km^{2}) is land and 0.077 square miles (0.2 km^{2}), or 0.35%, is water.

US 12 passes through the northern part of the township.

A branch of the Galien River flows northwest through the township to Lake Michigan eventually discharging in to the Atlantic Ocean through the Saint Lawrence River. Galien River was one of the locations where in 1966 the State of Michigan Department of Natural Resources began releasing Coho and Chinook salmon in Michigan rivers. The salmon, later as adults, would return to those locations to spawn.

A portion of southeastern Galien Township along with neighboring southwestern Bertrand Township are part of the Kankakee River drainage system which continues to the Mississippi River drainage basin. This is only one of two locations in Michigan (the other in the Upper Peninsula) that are part of the Mississippi River drainage basin.

== Demographics ==
Historical population
| Census | Pop. | Note | %± |
|---|---|---|---|
| 2000 | 1,611 | | — |
| 2010 | 1,452 | | −9.9% |
| 2020 | 1,412 | | −2.8% |

As of the census of 2000, there were 1,611 people, 619 households, and 448 families residing in the township. The population density was 73.0 inhabitants per square mile (28.2/km^{2}). There were 680 housing units at an average density of 30.8 per square mile (11.9/km^{2}). The racial makeup of the township was 96.46% White, 0.50% African American, 0.19% Native American, 0.43% Asian, 0.25% from other races, and 2.17% from two or more races. Hispanic or Latino of any race were 0.81% of the population.

There were 619 households, out of which 29.6% had children under the age of 18 living with them, 56.7% were married couples living together, 11.1% had a female householder with no husband present, and 27.5% were non-families. 22.8% of all households were made up of individuals, and 8.4% had someone living alone who was 65 years of age or older. The average household size was 2.59 and the average family size was 3.04.

In the township, the population was spread out, with 25.1% under the age of 18, 9.1% from 18 to 24, 26.1% from 25 to 44, 27.4% from 45 to 64, and 12.2% who were 65 years of age or older. The median age was 39 years. For every 100 females, there were 100.1 males. For every 100 females age 18 and over, there were 96.7 males.

The median income for a household in the township was $37,434, and the median income for a family was $44,706. Males had a median income of $35,337 versus $19,637 for females. The per capita income for the township was $17,850. About 5.8% of families and 7.7% of the population were below the poverty line, including 11.3% of those under age 18 and 4.6% of those age 65 or over.
