= Dave Pagel (politician) =

American politician

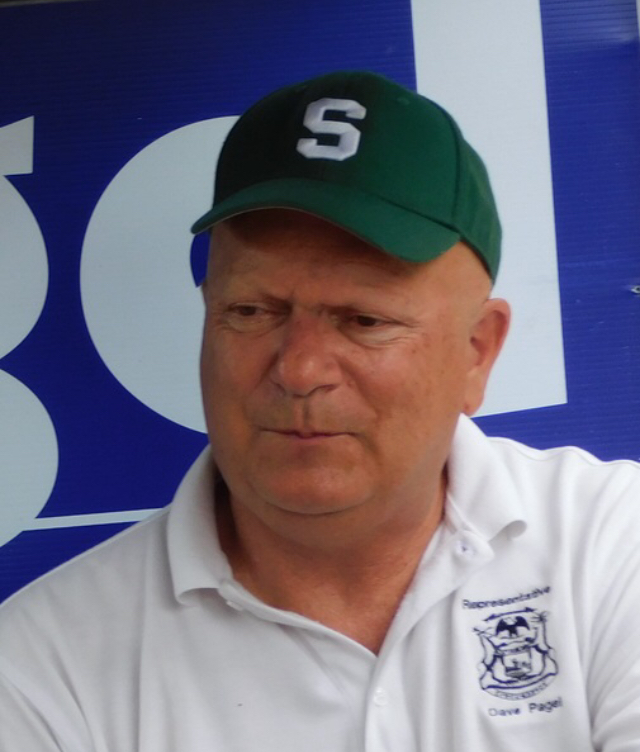

Member of the Michigan House of Representatives from the 78th district
- In office January 1, 2013 – January 9, 2019
- Preceded by: Sharon Tyler
- Succeeded by: Brad Paquette

Chairman of the Berrien County Board of Commissioners
- In office January 8, 2009 – December 31, 2012
- Preceded by: Dick Bartz
- Succeeded by: Jon Hinkelman

Personal details
- Party: Republican
- Spouse: Sue
- Children: Ashley, Jeremy, Hannah, Nate
- Education: Michigan State University
- Website: State Rep. Dave Pagel

Dave Pagel is a retired businessman and former Republican politician from Michigan who served in the Michigan House of Representatives. Prior to his election to the House, Pagel served for four years as the chairman of the Berrien County Board of Commissioners. Prior to that, he was the president of the Berrien Springs school board for 14 years.

In addition to his political activity, Pagel was involved in agriculture in Berrien Springs, Michigan for more than 40 years. His family owned Dave Pagel Produce, which packages and distributes Michigan-grown fruit sold in grocery stores throughout southwest Michigan, Northern Indiana, and the Chicago area.

== Education ==
Pagel grew up in Berrien Springs, Michigan where he attended the local public schools. He is an alumnus of Michigan State University in East Lansing, Michigan. He graduated in 1976 with a degree in agricultural business.

== Business career ==
After graduating from Michigan State, Pagel worked with his father and older brother on the family’s fruit farm. In order to assist in the marketing of the family’s farm output, Pagel founded Dave Pagel Produce in 1978. Over forty seasons the business expanded to supply fruit grown around Berrien County to grocery stores and farm stands in Michigan, Indiana, and Illinois. In addition to the produce packaging and distribution operation, the Pagel family also maintained an orchard of honeycrisp apples across the street.

== Political career ==
Pagel’s political career began with public service on the school board of Berrien Springs Public School system. As his own children were beginning school in 1993, Pagel was elected to the board and to the presidency of the board. After 14 years of service to the school board, Pagel ran for an open position on the Berrien County Board of Commissioners. He served two terms in that position and was chosen as the chair of the board for both. Following his four years on the county board, Pagel ran for an open seat in the Michigan House of Representatives. His father-in-law, Lad Stacey, had served in the state legislature in the 1970s and 1980s. Pagel won election to the 78th District in 2012 and was re-elected in 2014 and 2016. In February 2018, Pagel announced that he would seek the Republican Party nomination for the 21st District in the Michigan State Senate.
