= Ron Jelinek =

American politician

Member of the Michigan Senate from the 21st district
- In office January 1, 2003 – December 31, 2010
- Preceded by: Dale Shugars
- Succeeded by: John Proos

Member of the Michigan House of Representatives from the 78th district
- In office January 1, 1997 – December 31, 2002
- Preceded by: Carl Gnodtke
- Succeeded by: Neal Nitz

Personal details
- Born: November 18, 1945 (age 80) Three Oaks Township, Michigan
- Party: Republican
- Spouse: Diane
- Education: Western Michigan University (M.S.); Michigan State University (B.S.)

Ron Jelinek (born 1945) was a member of both houses of the Michigan Legislature–of the Michigan House of Representatives from 1997 to 2002, and of the Senate from 2003 to 2010.

Jelinek has a bachelor's degree from Michigan State University and a master's degree in education from Western Michigan University. He taught agricultural classes, industrial education classes and science classes in River Valley School District from 1967 to 1996.

Jelinek was elected to the Michigan State House in 1996, and served in that body until elected to the state senate in 2002. Jelinek and his wife Diane Fabian are the parents of three children. Diane died in 2009.

== Sources ==
- Project Vote Smart bio
