= Burckhalter =

Burckhalter may refer to:

- 3447 Burckhalter, an asteroid
- Joseph H. Burckhalter (1912–2004), American chemist

== See also ==
- Burkhalter (disambiguation)
