= Carl Gnodtke =

American politician

Member of the Michigan House of Representatives
- In office January 1, 1979 – December 31, 1996
- Preceded by: Harry Gast
- Succeeded by: Ron Jelinek
- Constituency: 43rd district (1979–1992); 78th district (1993–1996)

Personal details
- Born: January 2, 1936 Weesaw Township, Michigan
- Died: May 29, 2000 (aged 64) Ann Arbor, Michigan
- Party: Republican
- Spouse: Mary Jane
- Profession: Farmer

Carl Gnodtke (January 2, 1936 – May 29, 2000) was a Republican member of the Michigan House of Representatives, representing most of Berrien County for 17 years.

A native of Weesaw Township, Gnodtke served in several local offices, including on the township board (1965-1969), as a county commissioner (1969-1975), and as drain commissioner (1976-1978). He was elected to the House in 1978.

In the House, Gnodtke was known as an authority on agriculture issues, and ultimately chaired the agriculture committee.

Gnodtke retired from the House in 1996 to spend more time with his grandchildren and restore four vintage tractors. He suffered a heart attack at the University of Michigan Hospital in Ann Arbor and died there on May 29, 2000, aged 64.

Michigan House of Representatives
Preceded by Harry Gast	Member of the Michigan House of Representatives from the 43rd district 1979–1993	Succeeded by Charlie James Harrison Jr.
Preceded by Keith Muxlow	Member of the Michigan House of Representatives from the 78th district 1993–1997	Succeeded by Ron Jelinek
