= Neal Nitz =

American politician

Member of the Berrien County Board of Commissioners
- In office January 1, 2013 – April 13, 2015
- Preceded by: Bryan Bixby
- In office January 1, 1993 – December 31, 2002

Member of the Michigan House of Representatives from the 78th district
- In office January 1, 2003 – December 31, 2008
- Preceded by: Ron Jelinek
- Succeeded by: Sharon Tyler

Personal details
- Born: March 23, 1954 Benton Harbor, Michigan
- Died: April 13, 2015 (aged 61) St. Joseph, Michigan
- Resting place: Ruggles Cemetery, Baroda, Michigan
- Party: Republican
- Education: Southwestern Michigan College
- Profession: Farmer

Neal Nitz (March 23, 1954 – April 13, 2015) was an American politician.

== Early life ==
Born in Benton Harbor, Michigan, Nitz went to Southwestern Michigan College. A third-generation farmer, Nitz was the owner of Neal Nitz Farms. He was also a member of the Southwestern Michigan Tourist Council and the county planning commission, and a former president of the Baroda Lions Club.

== Political career ==
Nitz was a Republican member of the Michigan House of Representatives from 2003 through 2008. Both prior to and following his service in the House, he was a member of the Berrien County Board of Commissioners.
