= Lydick, Indiana =

- Unincorporated community
- Location within Indiana Location within the United States
- Coordinates: 41°41′36″N 86°22′38″W
- Country: United States
- State: Indiana
- County: St. Joseph
- Township: Warren
- Elevation: 738 ft (225 m)
- Time zone: UTC-5 (Eastern (EST))
  - Summer (DST): UTC-4 (EDT)
- ZIP code: 46628
- Area code: 574
- GNIS feature ID: 452674

Lydick is an unincorporated community in Warren Township, St. Joseph County, in the U.S. state of Indiana.

The community is part of the South Bend–Mishawaka, IN-MI, Metropolitan Statistical Area.

== History ==
Lydick originally had three different names, which were Warren Center, Sweet Home, and Lindley.

There remains an abutment of the St Joseph, South Bend & Southern which was part of the Michigan Central Railroad. A bridge formerly was there, which was built in 1910 which was part of the trackage elevation project by the St. Joseph South Bend & Southern Railroad (SJSB&S), but was dismantled in 1943 about immediately after Michigan Central abandoned its line there within a year. The SJSB&S connected St. Joseph to South Bend of a branch from New York Central's Water Level Route (now under the control of Norfolk Southern since 1999)

The Michiana Pallet Recycle Company is a place where people recycle pallets. It is located on Quince Road, between the Norfolk Southern and South Shore Line tracks which serve and run past Lydick as a train-horn area.

There is talks ongoing to convert this town into a quiet zone, but such acceptance would be required by both the South Bend government and Federal Railroad Administration.

Lydick was platted during 1831–82, in which later a post office opened under the name Warren Centre in 1839. It was renamed to Sweet Home in 1885, and in 1902 was renamed again to Lindley. It was renamed once more to Lydick in 1909, and was discontinued in 1913.

== Education ==
Lydick originally had 2 schools, a Lydick middle-high school and Warren Elementary, both of which no longer exist. Lydick School (1925–1969, demolished 1992) was built in the 1920s and housed up to 1,300 students. Warren Elementary School was constructed in 1957 for expansion. Lydick School was eventually demolished in 1992, even though it was abandoned just 25 years prior in 1969–70.

Warren Primary/Elementary School was an elementary school built by the South Bend Community School Corporation (SBCSC). It opened in 1957, then expanded in 1964 and 1980. In the mid-2010s, it was put under control of the South Bend Empowerment Zone, which led to problems and failures with the school management sector, with the school eventually being shuttered on June 1, 2024. The future of Warren is unknown.

== Transportation ==
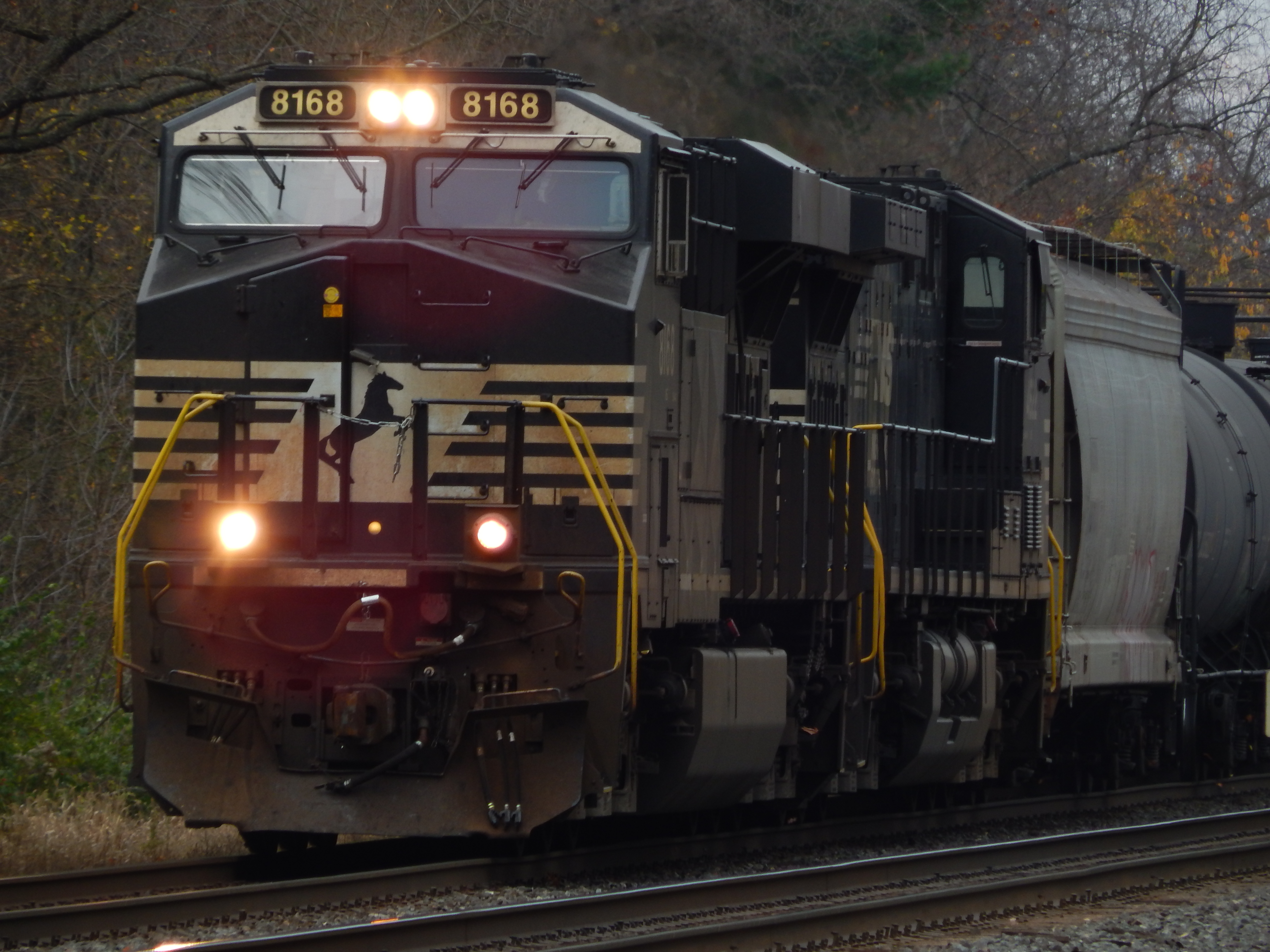
Norfolk Southern leads Tanker Train past Lydick in November 9th 2024

Although there is no station stops here after 1968, former railroads even at one point upwards of 10 railroads used Lydick as either a station or a trading hub. Since 1999, railroads that run through Lydick are Norfolk Southern, Amtrak, and South Shore Line. However, Penn Central (which was the merger of the New York Central by the Pennsylvania Railroad which failed in 1970) had also used Lydick and its predecessor railroads did too. The station was built by New York Central was torn down by Penn Central as an effort to consolidate freight operations to continue resuming as part of law until 1976. Because of this, the nearest train station is in South Bend which is used by Amtrak. Because of the rail service that is operated through, many railfans come out to this area rather than just Lydick itself.

== Highways ==
Measured by the intersection of Quince and Edison

- Indiana State Route 2 is located South, which redirects to South Bend, Indiana (going east) and towards La Porte, Indiana going west. This route used to run directly in a route which is occupied by Indiana State Road 933, and Indiana State Road 120. There was another route, Indiana State Road 220 which ran close in Rolling Prairie it was assigned in 1935 but abandoned just 3 years later, in 1938. This route is now just simply County Roads.
- US Highway 20 is located North, which will go into direct downtown South Bend toward(going east) and towards New Carlisle, Indiana, Burns Harbor, and Chicago going west.
