= Olive Township, St. Joseph County, Indiana =

Olive Township
- Township
- Location in St. Joseph County
- Coordinates: 41°41′07″N 86°28′17″W
- Country: United States
- State: Indiana
- County: St. Joseph
- Organized: 1830

Government
  - Type: Indiana township
  - Trustee: Will Miller

Area
  - Total: 57.50 sq mi (148.93 km^{2})
  - Land: 57.39 sq mi (148.65 km^{2})
  - Water: 0.11 sq mi (0.28 km^{2}) 0.19%
- Elevation: 735 ft (224 m)

Population (2020)
  - Total: 4,364
  - Density: 76.04/sq mi (29.36/km^{2})
- Time zone: UTC-5 (Eastern (EST))
  - Summer (DST): UTC-4 (EDT)
- ZIP codes: 46552, 46554, 46619, 46628
- Area code: 574
- GNIS feature ID: 453688
- Website: Official website

Olive Township is one of thirteen townships in St. Joseph County, in the U.S. state of Indiana. As of the 2020 census, its population was 4,364.

== History ==
Olive Township was organized in 1830 and was named after Olive Stanton Vail, an early settler.

== Geography ==
According to the United States Census Bureau, Olive Township covers an area of 57.5 square miles (149 km^{2}); of this, 57.4 square miles (149 km^{2}) (99.81 percent) is land and 0.11 square miles (0.28 km^{2}) (0.19 percent) is water.

=== Cities, towns, villages ===
- New Carlisle

=== Unincorporated towns ===
- Hamilton at 41.732268°N 86.478073°W
- Olive at 41.700046°N 86.448071°W
- Terre Coupee at 41.702268°N 86.477239°W
- Zeigler at 41.698379°N 86.433626°W

(This list is based on USGS data and may include former settlements.)

=== Adjacent townships ===
- Bertrand Township, Berrien County, Michigan (northeast)
- Warren Township (east)
- Greene Township (southeast)
- Lincoln Township, LaPorte County (southwest)
- Wills Township, LaPorte County (southwest)
- Galien Township, Berrien County, Michigan (northwest)
- Hudson Township, LaPorte County (northwest)

=== Cemeteries ===
The township contains Olive Chapel Cemetery.

=== Major highways ===
- Indiana Toll Road
- I-80
- I-90
- US 20
- SR 2

=== Airports and landing strips ===
- Hustons Airport

=== Lakes ===
- Lancaster Lake
- Spicer Lake

== History ==
Olive Township was formed in 1830. The township was named for Olive Stanton Vail, the wife of an early settler.

The Haven Hubbard Home and Studebaker Clubhouse and Tree Sign are listed on the National Register of Historic Places.

== Education ==
- New Prairie United School Corporation

Olive Township is served by the New Carlisle-Olive Township Public Library.

== Political districts ==
- Indiana's 2nd congressional district
- State House District 7
- State Senate District 8
