= Chain of Lakes =

Chain of Lakes, Chain O'Lakes, or Chain-O-Lakes is a common name for a series of lakes linked by waterways. Some of these include:

== Bodies of water ==
- Chain of Lakes (Winter Haven), Florida
- Chain O'Lakes and Chain O'Lakes State Park (Illinois), in northeast Illinois
- The Chain of Lakes (Minneapolis) area in Minneapolis, Minnesota
- Chain of Lakes (Michigan)
- Chain of Lakes in Hill County, Montana
- Fulton Chain Lakes, New York
- Chain of Lakes (South Dakota)
- Chain of Lakes, a feature in Golden Gate Park, San Francisco, California

== Populated places ==
- Chain-O-Lakes, Indiana, an unincorporated community in St. Joseph County
- Chain-O-Lakes, Missouri, a village in Barry County
- Chain O' Lakes, Wisconsin

== Other ==
- Chain of Lakes Middle School, a public middle school in Windermere, Florida
- Chain of Lakes Park, a baseball stadium in Winter Haven, Florida used by the Cleveland Indians for spring training
- Chain O'Lakes State Park (Indiana), in northeast Indiana
