= Keith Muxlow =

American politician

- Official 1991 portrait

Member of the Michigan House of Representatives
- In office January 1, 1981 – December 31, 1992
- Preceded by: Quincy P. Hoffman
- Succeeded by: Carl Gnodtke
- Constituency: 77th district (1981–1982); 78th district (1983–1992)

Mayor of Brown City
- In office 1972–1980

Personal details
- Born: October 12, 1933 Brown City, Michigan, U.S.
- Died: November 21, 2017 (aged 84)
- Party: Republican
- Spouse: Virginia

Military service
- Allegiance: United States
- Branch/service: United States Army
- Years of service: 1955–1957

Keith Muxlow (October 12, 1933 – November 21, 2017) was a Republican member of the Michigan House of Representatives from 1981 through 1992.

A native of Brown City, Muxlow graduated from Brown City High School. After high school, he served in the United States Army from 1955 to 1957 as a radio operator. He was the co-owner and manager of the Brown City Industrial Park before being elected to the city council in 1969, and eventually becoming mayor three years later. After eight years as mayor, Muxlow was elected to the House in 1980 where he served six terms.

Muxlow's brother is former State Representative Paul Muxlow.
