= Warren Township, St. Joseph County, Indiana =

Warren Township
- Township
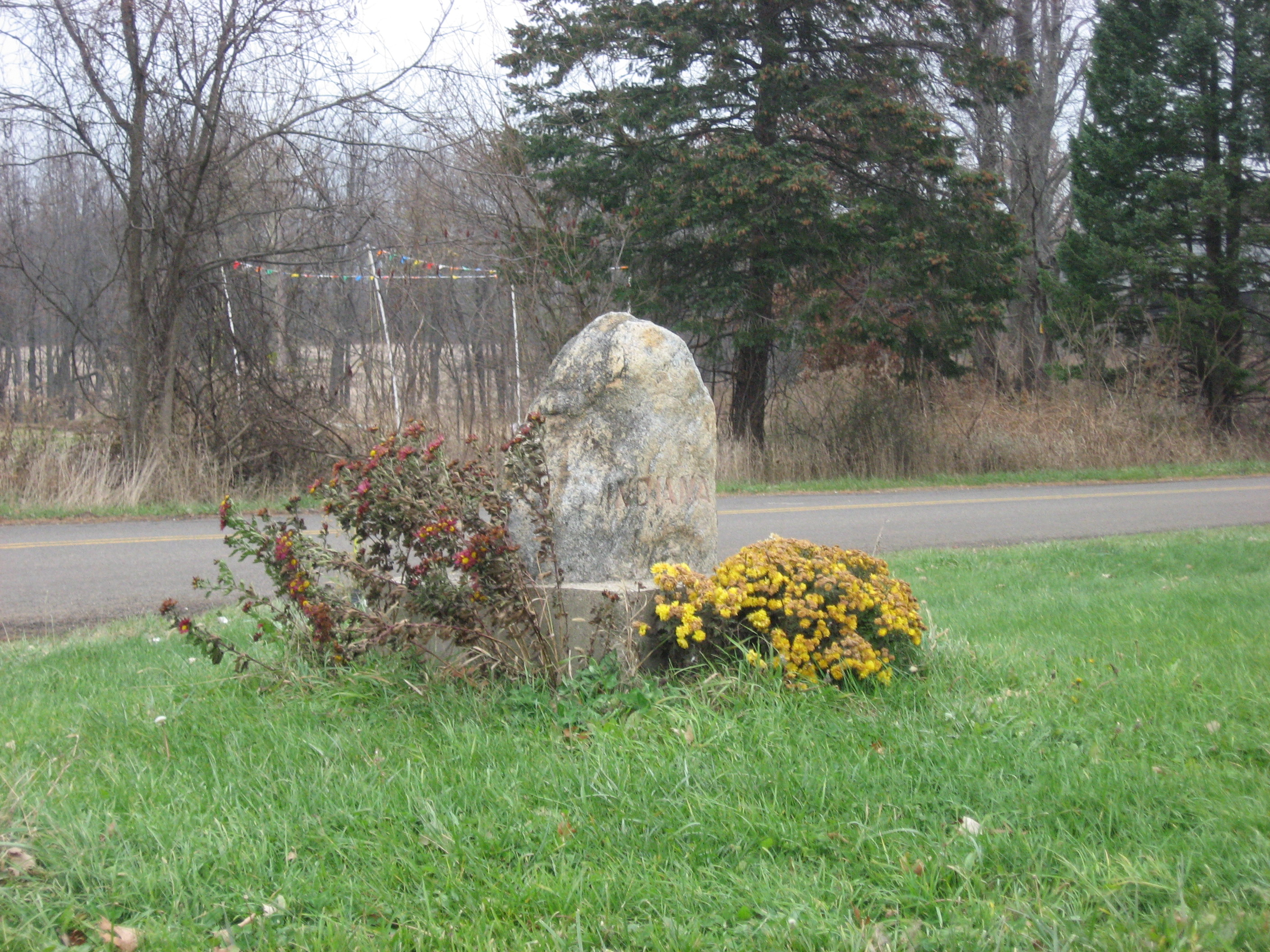
- Monument on Redwood Road at the Michigan border

- Location in St. Joseph County
- Coordinates: 41°41′28″N 86°22′59″W
- Country: United States
- State: Indiana
- County: St. Joseph

Government
  - Type: Indiana township

Area
  - Total: 32.95 sq mi (85.34 km^{2})
  - Land: 32.11 sq mi (83.16 km^{2})
  - Water: 0.84 sq mi (2.18 km^{2}) 2.55%
- Elevation: 720 ft (220 m)

Population (2020)
  - Total: 7,821
  - Density: 200/sq mi (77.3/km^{2})
- Time zone: UTC-5 (Eastern (EST))
  - Summer (DST): UTC-4 (EDT)
- ZIP codes: 46552, 46554, 46619, 46628
- Area code: 574
- GNIS feature ID: 453978

Warren Township is one of thirteen townships in St. Joseph County, in the U.S. state of Indiana. As of the 2000 census, its population was 6,430.

== Geography ==
According to the United States Census Bureau, Warren Township covers an area of 32.95 square miles (85.3 km^{2}); of this, 32.11 square miles (83.2 km^{2}) (97.45 percent) is land and 0.84 square miles (2.2 km^{2}) (2.55 percent) is water.

=== Cities, towns, villages ===
- South Bend (partial)

=== Unincorporated towns ===
- Chain-O-Lakes at 41.70838°N 86.380012°W
- Crumstown at 41.624213°N 86.408068°W
- Lydick at 41.69338°N 86.380012°W

(This list is based on USGS data and may include former settlements.)

=== Adjacent townships ===
- Bertrand Township, Berrien County, Michigan (north)
- German Township (northeast)
- Portage Township (east)
- Greene Township (south)
- Olive Township (west)

=== Major highways ===
- Indiana Toll Road
- I-80
- I-90
- US 20
- SR 2

=== Airports and landing strips ===
- Chain-O-Lakes Airport

=== Lakes ===
- Bass Lake
- Chamberlain Lake
- Mud Lake
- South Clear Lake
- Szmanda Lake

== School districts ==
- South Bend Community School Corporation

== Political districts ==
- Indiana's 2nd congressional district
- State House District 8
- State Senate District 8
