= Haven Hubbard Home =

- U.S. National Register of Historic Places
- U.S. Historic district
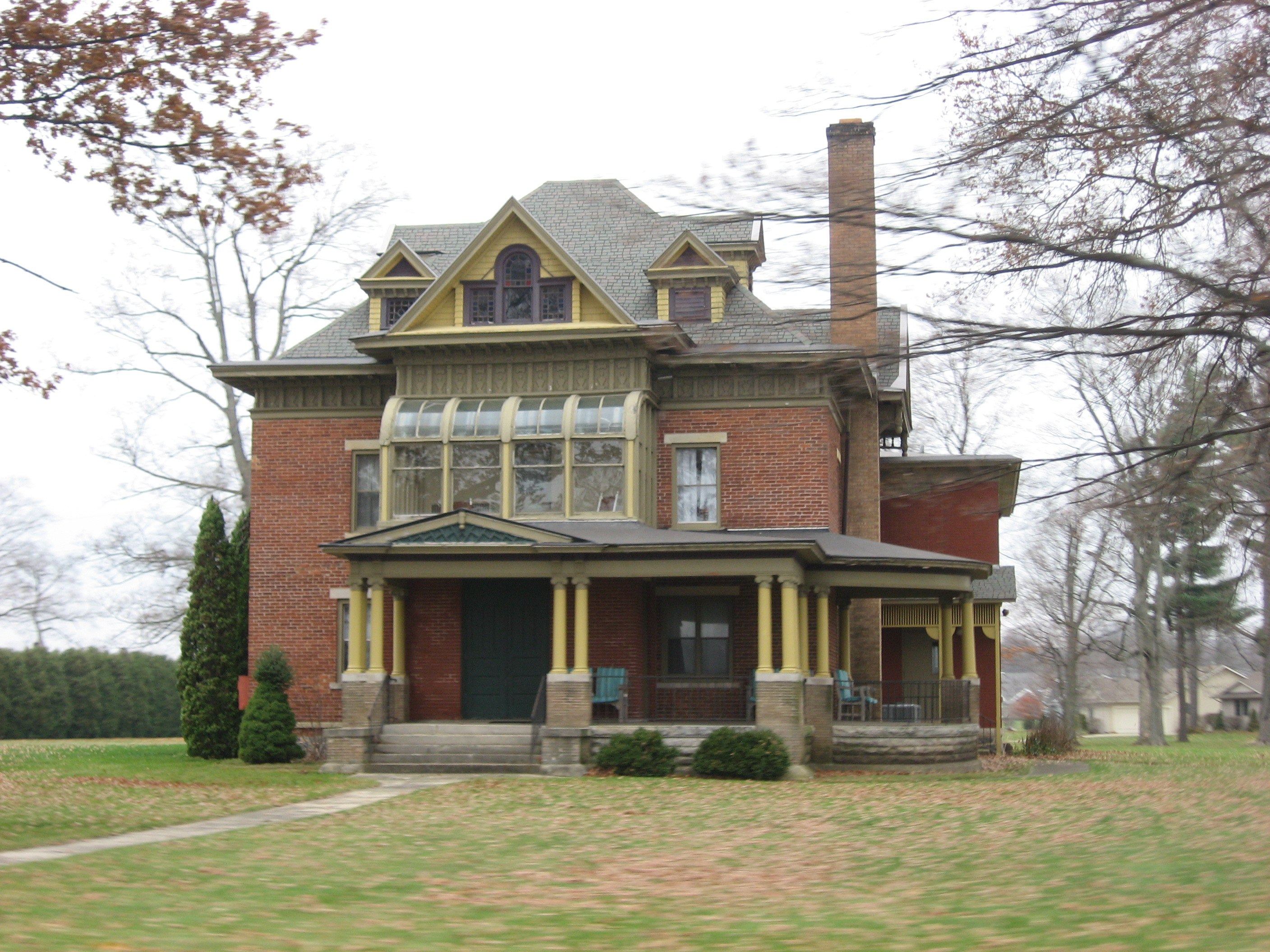
- Haven Hubbard House, November 2013

- Location within Indiana Location within the United States
- Location: 31895 Chicago Trail, northeast of New Carlisle in Olive Township, St. Joseph County, Indiana
- Coordinates: 41°43′51″N 86°28′56″W
- Area: 15.25 acres (6.17 ha)
- Built: 1860-1961
- Architectural style: Second Empire, Queen Anne, Colonial Revival, Collegiate Gothic
- NRHP reference No.: 13000091
- Added to NRHP: March 20, 2013

Haven Hubbard Home, also known as Hamilton Grove, is a historic sanitarium and national historic district located in Olive Township, St. Joseph County, Indiana. The district encompasses six contributing buildings and one contributing site on a former sanitarium originally developed as a working farm. It was developed between about 1860 and 1961, and includes examples of Second Empire, Queen Anne, Colonial Revival, and Collegiate Gothic architecture. Notable buildings include the Hubbard Homestead Home (c. 1860 /c. 1895), Homestead Shed (c. 1880), Homestead Barn (c. 1880), Pump House (c. 1860), Epp Hall (1922, 1964, 1984), and Haven Hubbard Home Parsonage (1960).

It was listed on the National Register of Historic Places in 2013.

== The Hubbard family ==
Haven Hubbard's grandfather was Jonathon Hubbard, who settled 320 acres (130 ha) of Terre Coupee prairie roughly 3 miles (4.8 km) to the north-east of New Carlisle, Indiana that he had bought in 1836 from a Samuel Harwood. He built the family homestead there, and with his son Ransom Hubbard enlarged it to roughly 704 acres (285 ha). Both Jonathon and Ransom had come from Oneida County, New York, where Ransom had been born in 1817. Jonathon platted the town of "Hubbard Town" on the prairie, originally going to be named Terre Coupee town, which was later renamed the village of Hamilton.

Ransom's son Haven, by his wife Mary (née Mary Davis), was born on 1853-12-04; with Jonathon then dying in 1861. Haven was educated at Notre Dame University and the University of Michigan and married Arminia Hoffman in 1909, who inherited the estate from him in 1916. Arminia had come to the United States from Leipzig in 1891, where she had been born on 1865-05-09. In 1920, finally furthering her late husband's wish during his lifetime to minister to the elderly, Arminia Hubbard deeded the farm to a local church, which built the Haven Hubbard Memorial Old People's Home in 1922 and formally dedicated it on 1923-05-05.

The Old People's Home remained a working farm, with residents encouraged to help with tending to crops, and comprised a chapel on the second floor, to be later remodelled in 1950 and named the Arminia Hubbard Memorial Chapel, administrative offices, sun parlours, a dining hall, guest rooms, and open-air verandahs.

Haven's elder brother was Lucius, born in 1844 and educated in the same places as Haven, who married a Martha Davis and in turn had a son Arthur Lucius Hubbard, who was to become a prominent banker and attorney in nearby South Bend, Indiana, forming a law partnership with Samuel Pettengill.
