= Burkhalter =

Burkhalter is a surname. Notable people with the surname include:

- Blake Burkhalter (born 2000), American baseball player
- Christine Burkhalter (born 1977), Swiss sport shooter
- Didier Burkhalter (born 1960), Swiss politician from Neuchâtel; member of the Swiss National Council 2003–07, member of the Swiss Federal Council 2009-
- Dominik Burkhalter (born 1975), Swiss jazz band leader, composer, and drummer
- Edward A. Burkhalter (1928–2020), American retired naval officer; Chief of Naval Intelligence and other high staff posts
- Everett G. Burkhalter (1897–1975), American politician from California; 1963–65
- Joscha Burkhalter (born 1996), Swiss biathlete
- Larry E. Burkhalter (born 1950), American politician
- René Burkhalter (1934–2024), Swiss fencing commissioner; recipient of the Olympic Order by the IOC

Fictional characters:

- General Albert Hans Burkhalter from Hogan's Heroes
