= Bertrand Township, Michigan =

- Charter township
- Charter Township of Bertrand
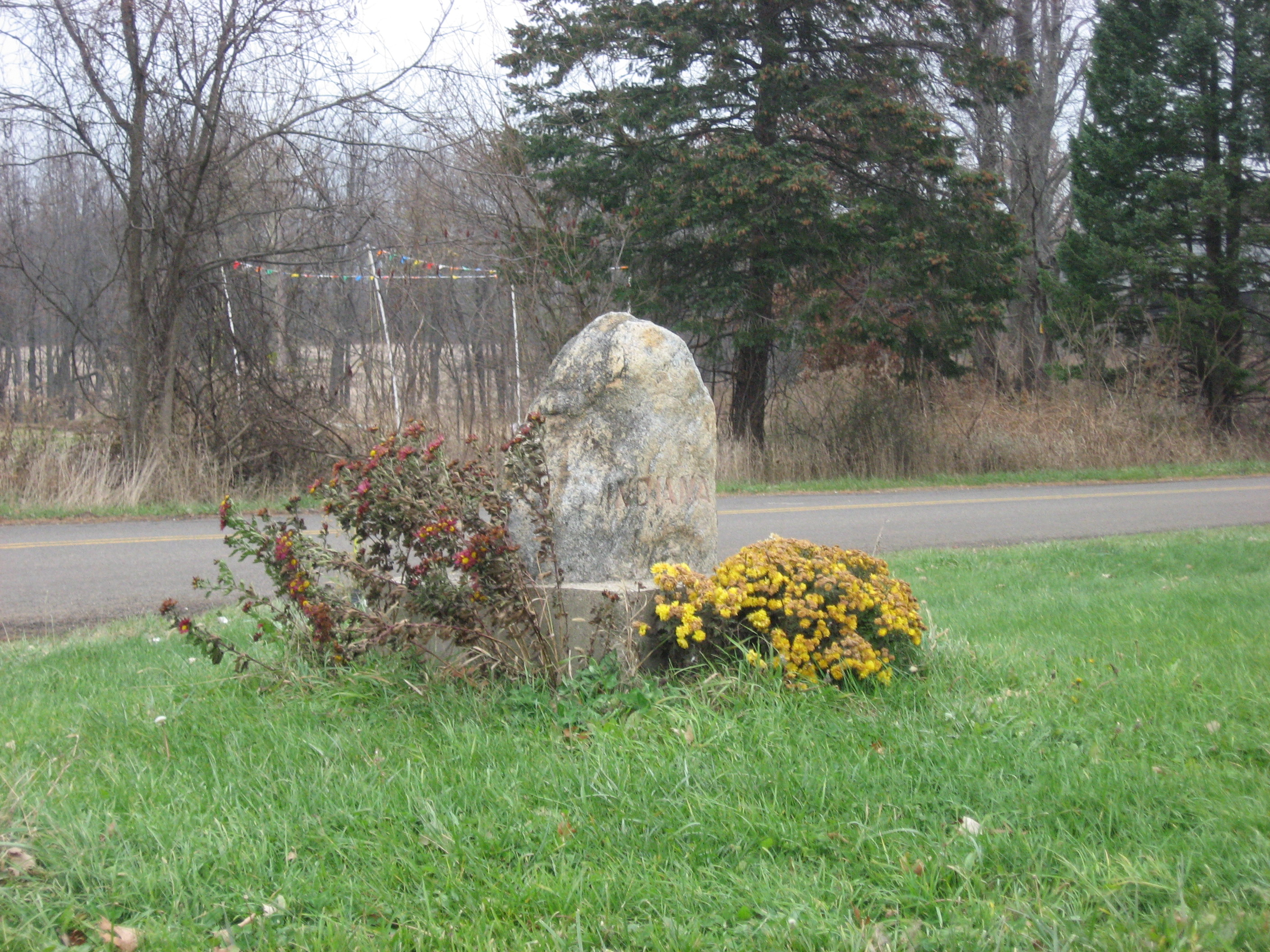
- Monument on Chicago Road at the Indiana–Michigan border

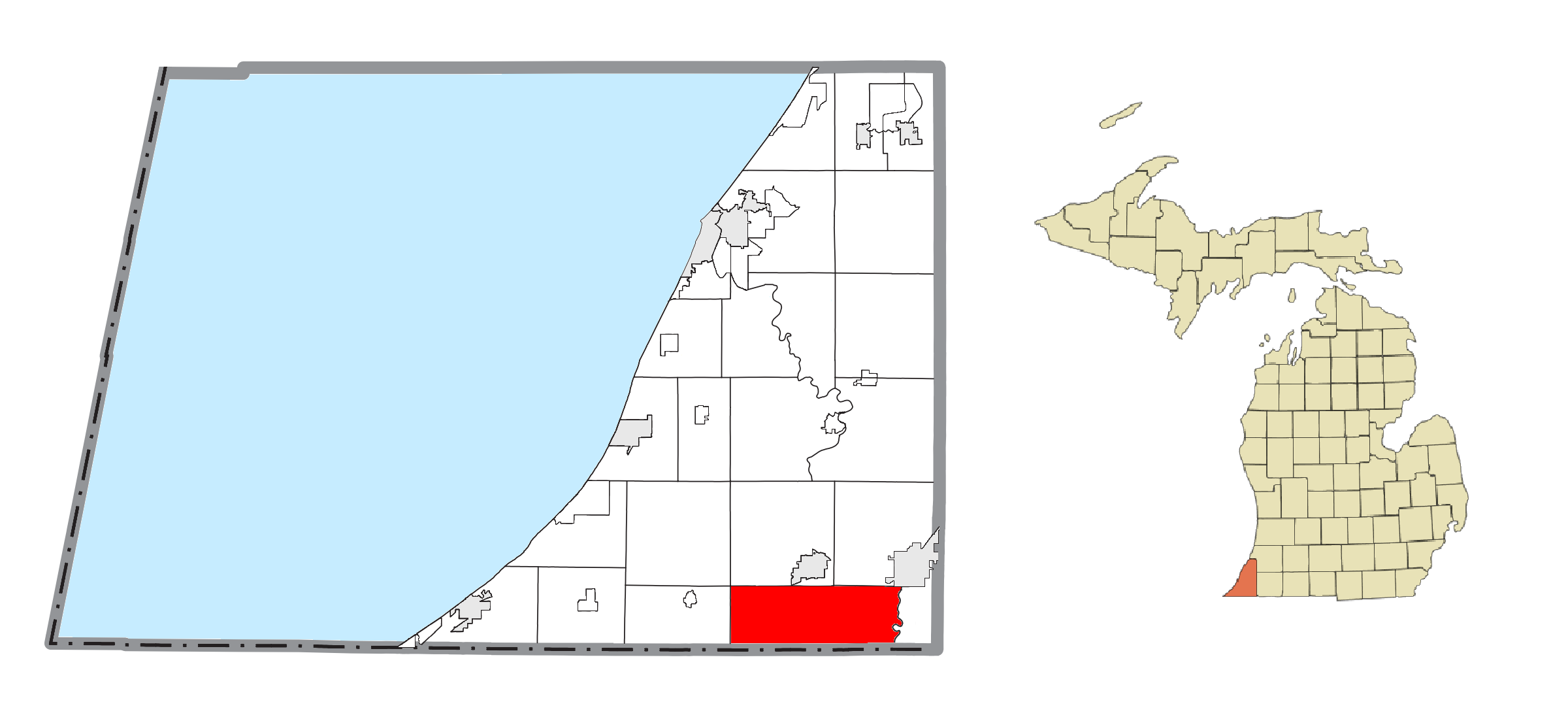
- Location within Berrien County

- Location within the state of Michigan
- Coordinates: 41°47′08″N 86°22′29″W
- Country: United States
- State: Michigan
- County: Berrien
- Established: 1836

Area
  - Total: 35.0 sq mi (90.7 km^{2})
  - Land: 34.4 sq mi (89.2 km^{2})
  - Water: 0.58 sq mi (1.5 km^{2})
- Elevation: 784 ft (239 m)

Population (2020)
  - Total: 2,611
- Time zone: UTC-5 (Eastern (EST))
  - Summer (DST): UTC-4 (EDT)
- ZIP code(s): 49107, 49113, 49120
- Area code: 269
- FIPS code: 26-07920
- GNIS feature ID: 1625927
- Website: Official website

Bertrand Charter Township is a charter township of Berrien County in the U.S. state of Michigan. As of the 2020 census, the township population was 2,611.

Bertrand Charter Township was established in 1836, and named for Joseph Bertrand, a pioneer citizen.

== Communities ==
Dayton is an unincorporated community in the western part of township at 41°47′54″N 86°26′22″W. It is on Dayton Lake off U.S. Highway 12 about midway between Niles and Three Oaks, just a few miles north of the Indiana state border. The settlement was founded in 1830 by Benjamin Redding, and a post office named "Redding's Mills" opened on June 17, 1850. It was designated on an 1839 map of Michigan as "Terré Coupe", and when the Michigan Central Railroad was built through the area in 1848, the depot was named Terre Coupe (and also spelled Terra Coupée). The name of the depot was changed to Dayton after the post office was renamed "Dayton" on April 11, 1851, after Dayton, Ohio, where many early settlers had come from. The post office was discontinued on September 22, 1967.

== Geography ==
According to the United States Census Bureau, the township has a total area of 35.0 square miles (90.7 km^{2}), of which 34.4 square miles (89.2 km^{2}) is land and 0.58 square miles (1.5 km^{2}), or 1.71%, is water.

The township is in the southeast portion of the county, with Galien Township to the west, Weesaw Township to the northwest, and Buchanan Township with the village of Buchanan to the north on the west side of the township. The city of Niles lies on the northeast corner of the township, while irregularly-shaped Niles Township is to the north on the east side of the township and also to the east of the township. St. Joseph County, Indiana, lies to the south, with Olive Township to the southwest, Warren Township due south, and German Township with the city of South Bend to the south on the east side of the township.

U.S. Route 31 crosses the township north and south, while US 12 crosses it east and west.

Along with a corner of Galien Township, the southern part of the township is the only part of the Lower Peninsula of Michigan that is part of the drainage of the Mississippi River, and with the Michigan shore of Lac Vieux Desert in the Upper Peninsula, is one of two such areas in the state.

== Demographics ==
As of the census of 2000, there were 2,380 people, 903 households, and 700 families residing in the township. The population density was 68.9 inhabitants per square mile (26.6/km^{2}). There were 963 housing units at an average density of 27.9 per square mile (10.8/km^{2}). The racial makeup of the township was 97.23% White, 0.50% African American, 0.59% Native American, 0.46% Asian, 0.13% from other races, and 1.09% from two or more races. Hispanic or Latino of any race were 0.76% of the population.

There were 903 households, out of which 32.0% had children under the age of 18 living with them, 68.3% were married couples living together, 6.3% had a female householder with no husband present, and 22.4% were non-families. 17.9% of all households were made up of individuals, and 8.4% had someone living alone who was 65 years of age or older. The average household size was 2.64 and the average family size was 3.00.

In the township the population was spread out, with 23.7% under the age of 18, 7.1% from 18 to 24, 26.7% from 25 to 44, 28.6% from 45 to 64, and 13.8% who were 65 years of age or older. The median age was 41 years. For every 100 females there were 102.7 males. For every 100 females age 18 and over, there were 98.1 males.

The median income for a household in the township was $55,183, and the median income for a family was $59,118. Males had a median income of $35,682 versus $24,800 for females. The per capita income for the township was $22,130. About 3.7% of families and 3.9% of the population were below the poverty line, including 2.0% of those under age 18 and 5.6% of those age 65 or over.
