= Zeigler, Indiana =

- Unincorporated community
- Location within Indiana Location within the United States
- Coordinates: 41°41′54″N 86°26′01″W
- Country: United States
- State: Indiana
- County: St. Joseph
- Township: Olive
- Elevation: 735 ft (224 m)
- Time zone: UTC-5 (Eastern (EST))
  - Summer (DST): UTC-4 (EDT)
- ZIP code: 46599
- Area code: 574
- GNIS feature ID: 452846

Zeigler is an unincorporated community in Olive Township, St. Joseph County, in the U.S. state of Indiana.

The community is part of the South Bend–Mishawaka IN-MI, Metropolitan Statistical Area.
