= Hamilton, St. Joseph County, Indiana =

Hamilton
- Unincorporated community
- Location within Indiana Location within the United States
- Coordinates: 41°43′56″N 86°28′41″W
- Country: United States
- State: Indiana
- County: St. Joseph
- Township: Olive
- Elevation: 758 ft (231 m)
- Time zone: UTC-5 (Eastern (EST))
  - Summer (DST): UTC-4 (EDT)
- ZIP code: 46552
- Area code: 574
- GNIS feature ID: 452615

Hamilton is an unincorporated community in Olive Township, St. Joseph County, in the U.S. state of Indiana.

== History ==
Hamilton was originally called Terre Coupee, and under the latter name was platted in 1837. The name of Hamilton comes from Hamilton's Tavern the community once contained. A post office opened under the name Terre Coupee in 1831, and remained in operation until it was discontinued in 1893. When the town was renamed, the "Terra Coupee" name was transferred to a station on the railroad south of Plainfield.
