= Buchanan Township, Michigan =

- Charter township
- Charter Township of Buchanan
- Flag Seal

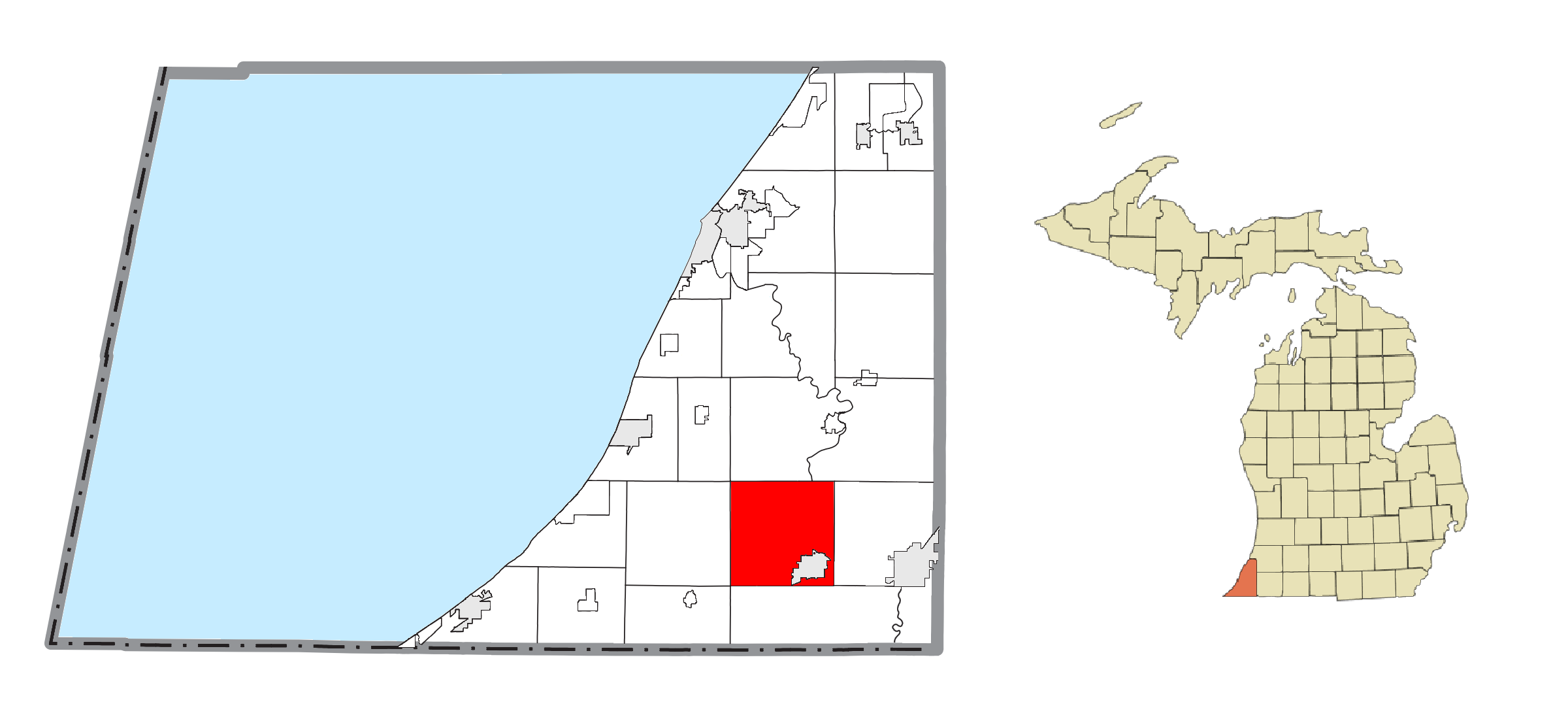
- Location within Berrien County

- Location within the state of Michigan Buchanan Township (the United States)
- Coordinates: 41°50′57″N 86°23′41″W
- Country: United States
- State: Michigan
- County: Berrien
- Established: 1837

Area
  - Total: 33.2 sq mi (85.9 km^{2})
  - Land: 32.1 sq mi (83.2 km^{2})
  - Water: 1.0 sq mi (2.7 km^{2})
- Elevation: 784 ft (239 m)

Population (2020)
  - Total: 3,436
- Time zone: UTC-5 (Eastern (EST))
  - Summer (DST): UTC-4 (EDT)
- ZIP code(s): 49107
- Area code: 269
- FIPS code: 26-11420
- GNIS feature ID: 1625997
- Website: Official website

Buchanan Charter Township is a charter township of Berrien County in the U.S. state of Michigan. As of the 2020 census, the township population was 3,436. The city of Buchanan is located in the southeast portion of the township.

Buchanan Charter Township is bounded by Oronoko Charter Township to the north, Berrien Township to the north and northeast, Niles Township to the east, Bertrand Township to the south and southeast, Galien Township to the southwest, Weesaw Township to the west, and Baroda Township to the northwest.

No major highways transit the township, although US 12 parallels the southern edge and US 31 passes just to the east.

== Communities ==
- Fort Sumter was a settlement on the south side of the St. Joseph River founded in the early 1860s.

== Geography ==
According to the United States Census Bureau, the township has a total area of 33.2 square miles (85.9 km^{2}), of which 32.1 square miles (83.2 km^{2}) is land and 1.0 square mile (2.7 km^{2}), or 3.11%, is water.

The St. Joseph River enters the township from the southeast, bends north by the city of Buchanan, and then flows mostly north through the eastern portion of the township.

=== Nature ===
The 105-acre (0.42 km^{2}) Fernwood Botanical Garden and Nature Preserve is located on the eastern bank of the St. Joseph River in the northeast corner of the township and is open year-round. Madron Lake is also located within the township.

=== Sports ===
Red Bud MX motocross track is located in the northern portion of the township.

== Demographics ==
As of the census of 2000, there were 3,510 people, 1,317 households, and 1,023 families residing in the township. The population density was 108.7 inhabitants per square mile (42.0/km^{2}). There were 1,554 housing units at an average density of 48.1 per square mile (18.6/km^{2}). The racial makeup of the township was 96.18% White, 1.20% African American, 0.48% Native American, 0.26% Asian, 0.43% from other races, and 1.45% from two or more races. Hispanic or Latino of any race were 1.25% of the population.

There were 1,317 households, out of which 32.3% had children under the age of 18 living with them, 66.4% were married couples living together, 7.7% had a female householder with no husband present, and 22.3% were non-families. 18.2% of all households were made up of individuals, and 7.4% had someone living alone who was 65 years of age or older. The average household size was 2.66 and the average family size was 3.00.

In the township the population was spread out, with 25.5% under the age of 18, 6.7% from 18 to 24, 27.8% from 25 to 44, 26.3% from 45 to 64, and 13.6% who were 65 years of age or older. The median age was 38 years. For every 100 females, there were 106.3 males. For every 100 females age 18 and over, there were 101.9 males.

The median income for a household in the township was $40,503, and the median income for a family was $46,797. Males had a median income of $35,000 versus $24,274 for females. The per capita income for the township was $19,572. About 4.6% of families and 5.2% of the population were below the poverty line, including 5.8% of those under age 18 and 1.0% of those age 65 or over.
