= Galien, Michigan =

- Village
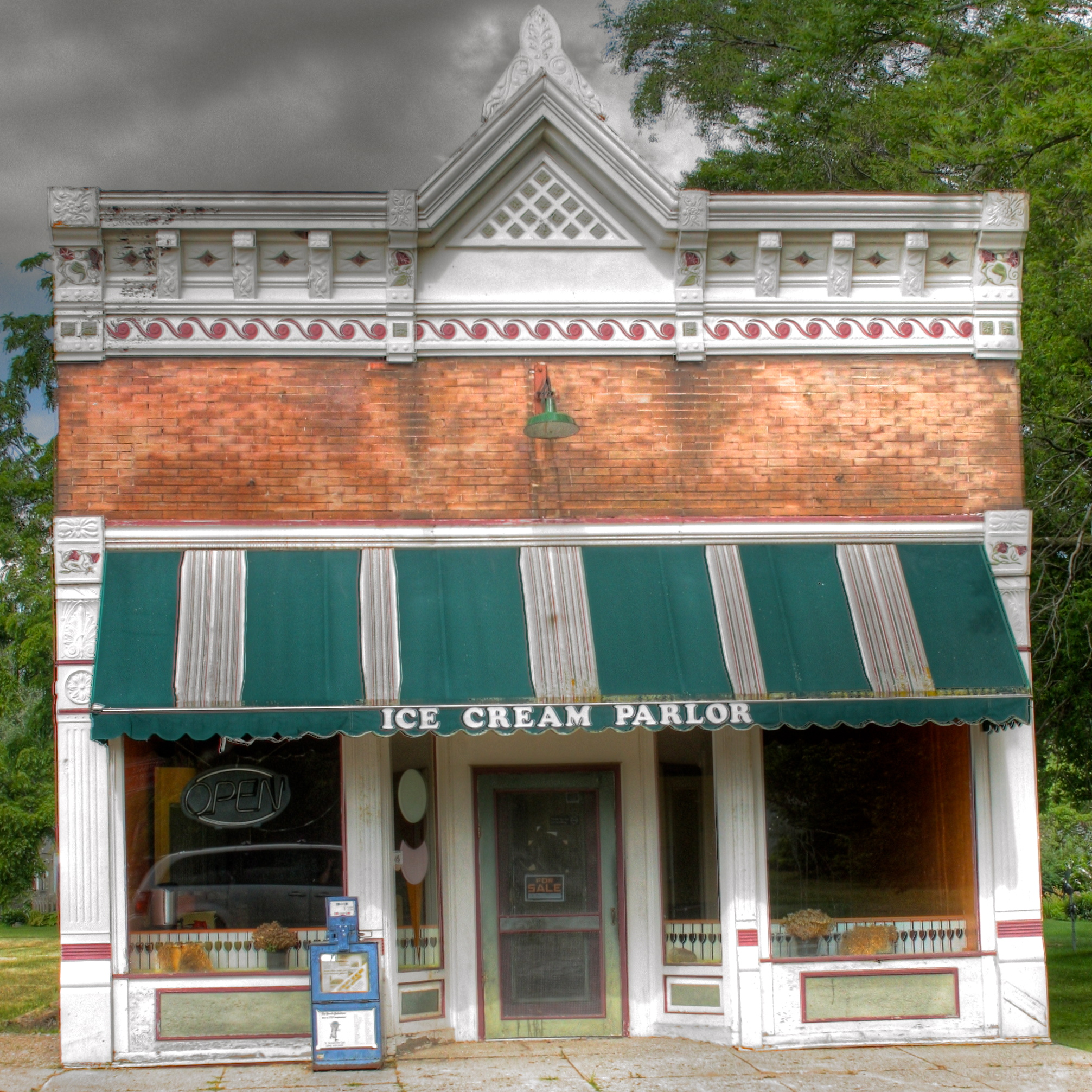
- Ice Cream Parlor in Galien

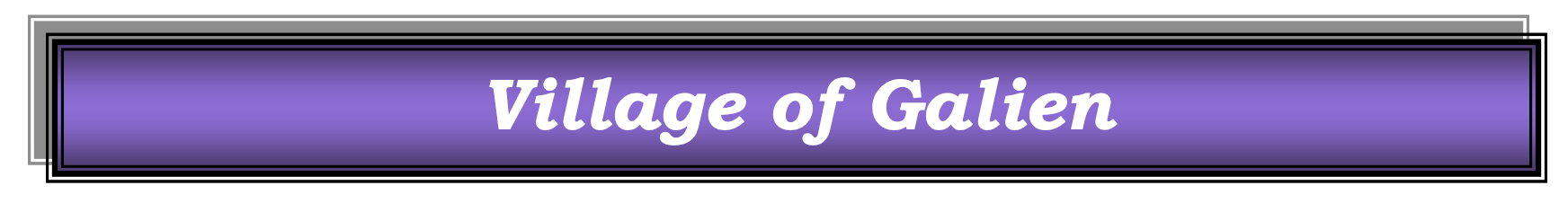
- logo

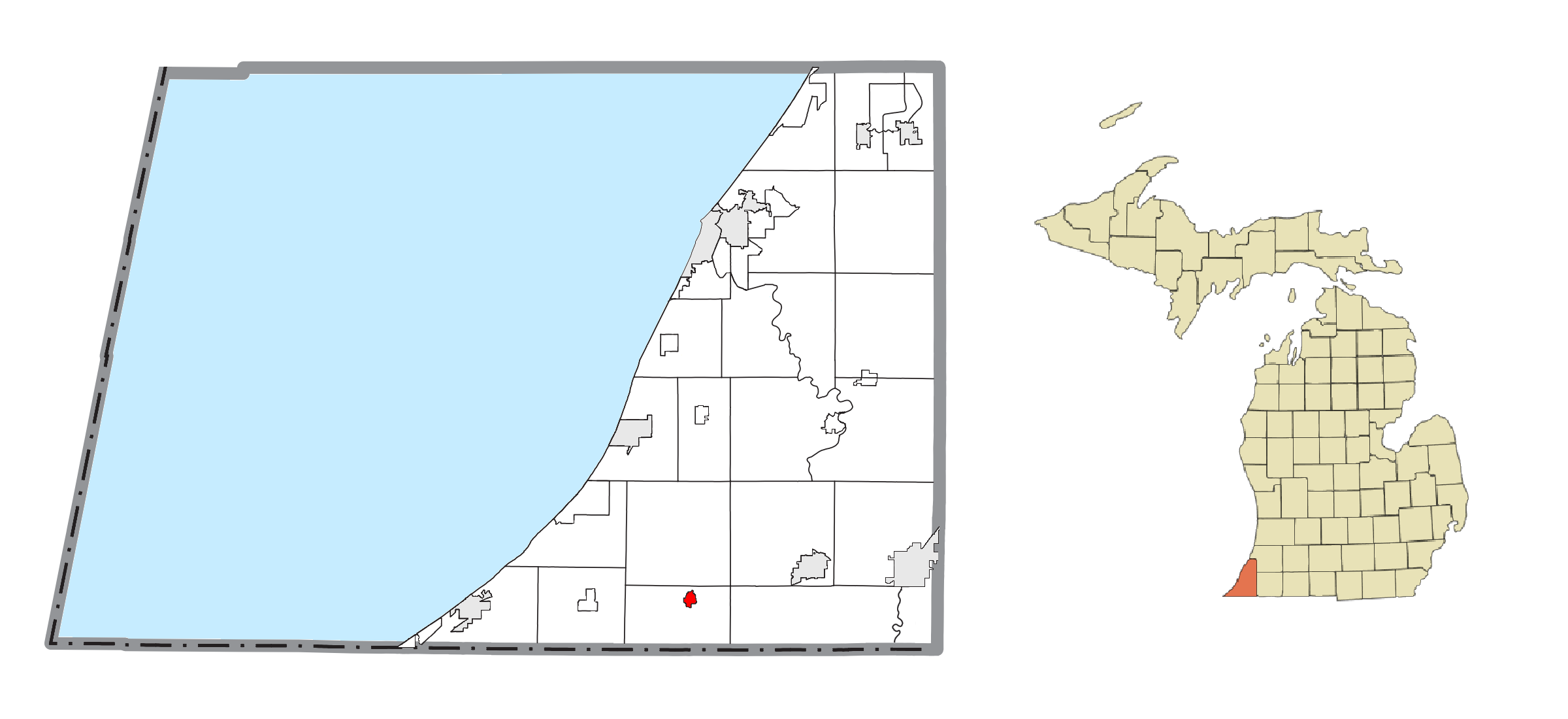
- Location within Berrien County

- Location within the state of Michigan
- Coordinates: 41°48′11″N 86°29′53″W
- Country: United States
- State: Michigan
- County: Berrien
- Township: Galien

Area
  - Total: 0.41 sq mi (1.06 km^{2})
  - Land: 0.41 sq mi (1.06 km^{2})
  - Water: 0 sq mi (0.00 km^{2})
- Elevation: 669 ft (204 m)

Population (2020)
  - Total: 513
  - Density: 1,249.1/sq mi (482.27/km^{2})
- Time zone: UTC-5 (Eastern (EST))
  - Summer (DST): UTC-4 (EDT)
- ZIP code(s): 49113
- Area code: 269
- FIPS code: 26-31300
- GNIS feature ID: 1618901

Galien (pronounced guh-LEEN) is a village in Berrien County in the U.S. state of Michigan. The population was 513 at the 2020 census. The village is located within Galien Township.

== History ==
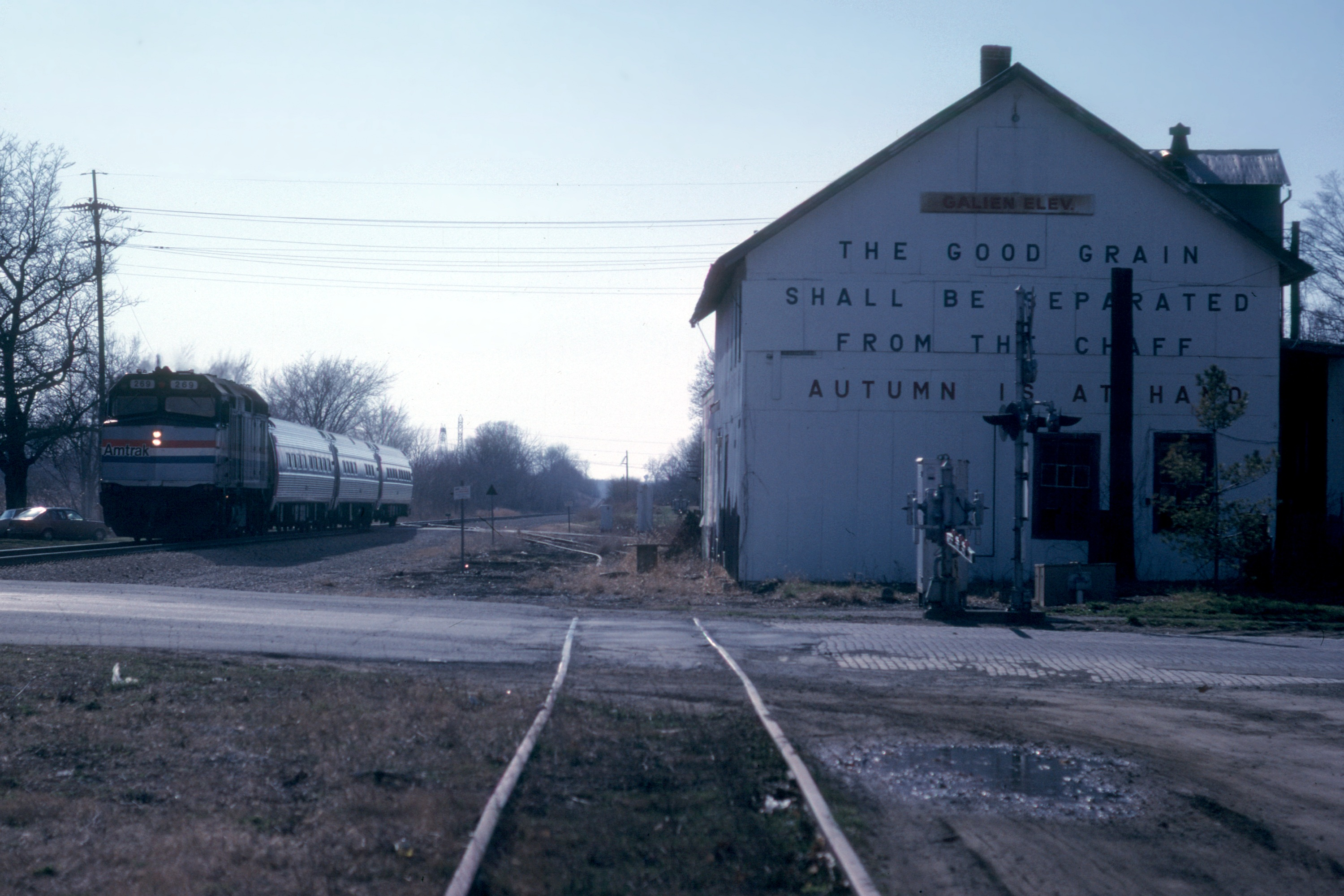
An Amtrak train passing through Galien in 1987

The founder of the village of Galien was George A. Blakeslee. Born in Pennsylvania, he came to Galien Township in 1853. He platted Galien village in 1861, and it was incorporated in 1879. The village straddled a fairly new Michigan Central Railroad completed in 1849 from New Buffalo to Detroit. Blakeslee operated a sawmill at the site of present-day Galien, and established a general store. He purchased several thousand acres in the vicinity of the village and harvested the timber for his sawmill operation. For many years after Galien was established, he was president of the village, postmaster, justice of the peace, member of the school board and later World Bishop of the Latter Day Saint's Church. Blakeslee Street was named after him and is located in the SE quadrant of the city plat.

On July 21, 1971, fire broke out in a hardware store in downtown Galien and destroyed that building as well as a restaurant and a beauty salon adjacent to it. Another fire on October 18, 1971, extensively damaged a nearby IGA supermarket. Between the two fires in one year, the northeast corner of the business district was destroyed.

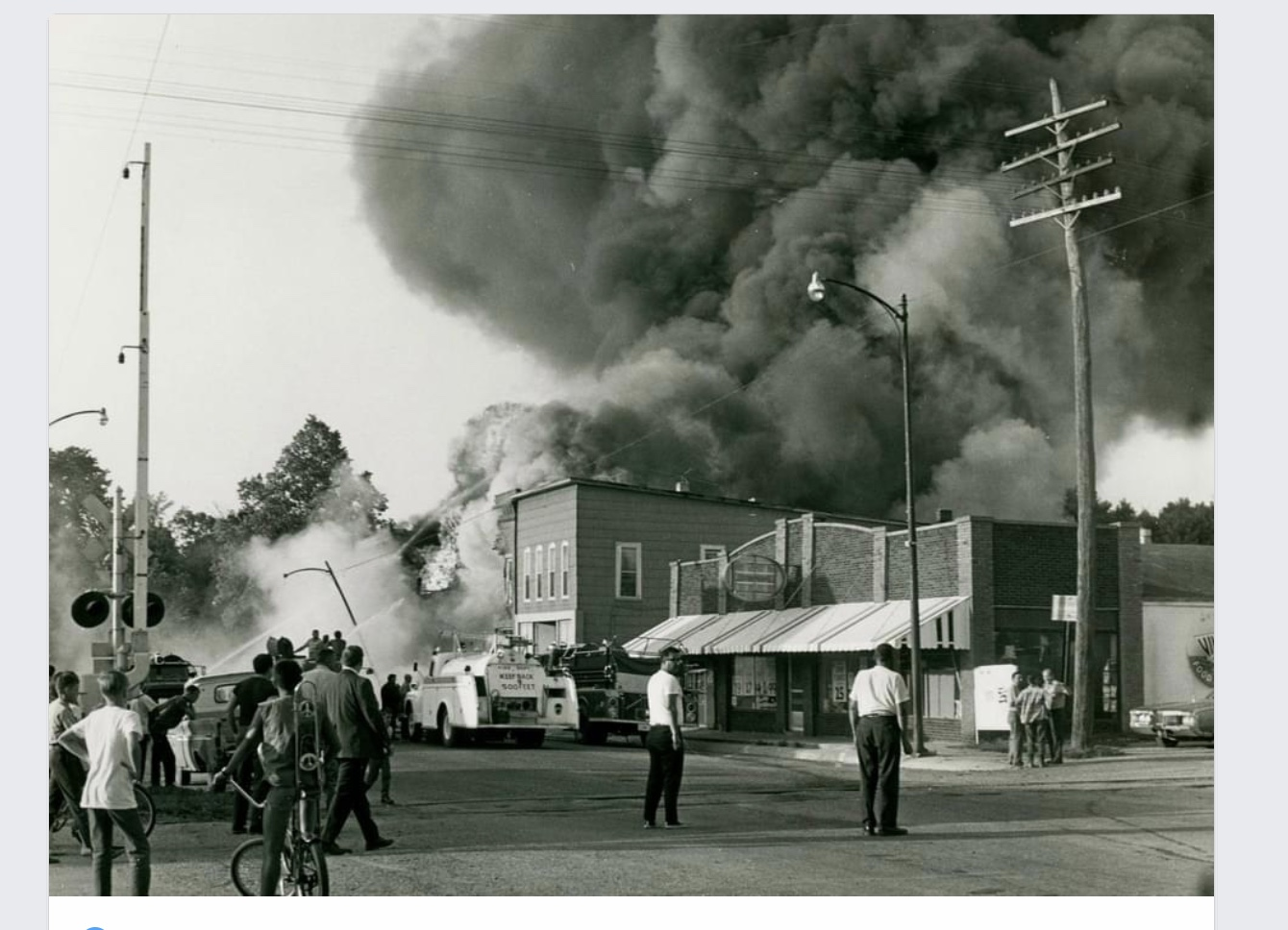
Area volunteer fire trucks respond to Galien downtown fire July 21, 1971. IGA store, shown to the right, will burn down three months later.

== Geography ==
According to the United States Census Bureau, the village has a total area of 0.42 square miles (1.09 km^{2}), all land. Galien straddles U.S. Highway 12, and is located in the Galien River basin, being situated just west and south of the main stem.

== Demographics ==
Historical population
Census	Pop.	Note	%±
1880	413		—
1890	492		19.1%
1900	440		−10.6%
1910	405		−8.0%
1920	460		13.6%
1930	488		6.1%
1940	567		16.2%
1950	610		7.6%
1960	750		23.0%
1970	691		−7.9%
1980	692		0.1%
1990	596		−13.9%
2000	593		−0.5%
2010	549		−7.4%
2020	513		−6.6%
U.S. Decennial Census

=== 2010 census ===
As of the census of 2010, there were 549 people, 227 households, and 133 families living in the village. The population density was 1,307.1 inhabitants per square mile (504.7/km^{2}). There were 255 housing units at an average density of 607.1 per square mile (234.4/km^{2}). The racial makeup of the village was 96.4% White, 1.1% African American, 0.9% Native American, 0.2% Asian, 0.2% from other races, and 1.3% from two or more races. Hispanic or Latino of any race were 1.8% of the population.

There were 227 households, of which 29.1% had children under the age of 18 living with them, 39.6% were married couples living together, 12.3% had a female householder with no husband present, 6.6% had a male householder with no wife present, and 41.4% were non-families. 33.5% of all households were made up of individuals, and 16.3% had someone living alone who was 65 years of age or older. The average household size was 2.42 and the average family size was 3.09.

The median age in the village was 37.6 years. 24% of residents were under the age of 18; 8.6% were between the ages of 18 and 24; 26.3% were from 25 to 44; 25.3% were from 45 to 64; and 15.7% were 65 years of age or older. The gender makeup of the village was 50.3% male and 49.7% female.

=== 2000 census ===
As of the census of 2000, there were 593 people, 223 households, and 159 families living in the village. The population density was 1,329.9 inhabitants per square mile (513.5/km^{2}). There were 244 housing units at an average density of 547.2 per square mile (211.3/km^{2}). The racial makeup of the village was 96.96% White, 0.17% Native American, and 2.87% from two or more races. Hispanic or Latino of any race were 0.84% of the population.

There were 223 households, out of which 35.9% had children under the age of 18 living with them, 46.6% were married couples living together, 20.2% had a female householder with no husband present, and 28.3% were non-families. 23.8% of all households were made up of individuals, and 10.3% had someone living alone who was 65 years of age or older. The average household size was 2.63 and the average family size was 3.14.

In the village, the population was spread out, with 30.9% under the age of 18, 9.3% from 18 to 24, 29.0% from 25 to 44, 18.9% from 45 to 64, and 12.0% who were 65 years of age or older. The median age was 34 years. For every 100 females, there were 99.7 males. For every 100 females age 18 and over, there were 88.9 males.

The median income for a household in the village was $35,250, and the median income for a family was $35,313. Males had a median income of $36,053 versus $17,692 for females. The per capita income for the village was $15,739. About 13.3% of families and 14.3% of the population were below the poverty line, including 22.0% of those under age 18 and 10.0% of those age 65 or over.
