= Fernwood Botanical Garden and Nature Preserve =

Arboretum, botanical garden, and nature preserve in Michigan

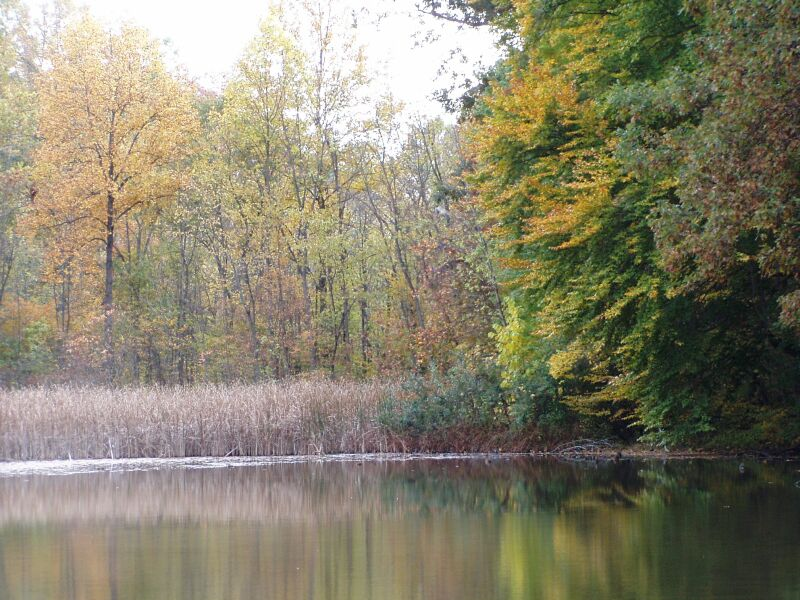
- Pond scene at Fernwood in late autumn.

- Location within Michigan
- Location: Lower Peninsula, Buchanan Township, Michigan USA
- Nearest city: Buchanan, Michigan
- Coordinates: 41°51′55″N 86°20′48″W
- Area: 105 acres (42 ha)
- Established: 1964
- Governing body: Fernwood, Inc. (non-profit)
- Website: Official website

The Fernwood Botanical Garden and Nature Preserve is an arboretum, botanical garden, and nature preserve located at 13988 Range Line Road in Buchanan Township, Michigan. It covers an area of 105 acres (42 ha). It is open to the public; an admission fee is charged.

== History ==
Fernwood originally began as the home of Kay and Walter Boydston, who purchased its first 12.5 acres (51,000 m^{2}) in 1941, and became a public garden in 1964, through the efforts of Lawrence and Mary Plym. Additional land purchases have increased the site to 105 acres (42 ha), providing space for the arboretum, prairie restoration, and newer gardens.

== Features ==
The Garden is located on the St. Joseph River and contains landscape gardens (8 acres), woodland nature preserve (50 acres), an arboretum of trees and shrubs from temperate regions around the world (40 acres, started in 1971), and restored tallgrass prairie (5 acres, started in 1976), as well as a conservatory (greenhouse) featuring more than 100 kinds of tropical ferns.

The landscape gardens include a Japanese "dry" garden designed by Ben Oki (1979), a hosta garden with dawn redwood and Ginkgo, a tufa rock garden started in the 1950s, a fern garden with more than 50 types of hardy ferns, a boxwood garden, a lilac garden (1940s), a lily pond (1977), and an herb garden featuring over 200 types of herbs.

The nature center displays exhibits about the ecosystems and animals of Fernwood and items of seasonal interest, as well as live animals including an active beehive and local reptiles and amphibians. Environmental education programs are offered year round.

== See also ==
- List of botanical gardens in the United States
