= Brad Paquette =

American politician

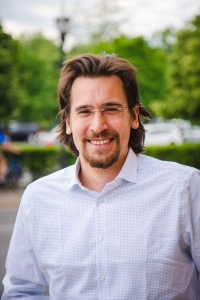

Member of the Michigan House of Representatives
- Incumbent
- Assumed office January 1, 2019
- Preceded by: Dave Pagel
- Constituency: 78th district (2019-2022); 37th district (2023-present)

Personal details
- Born: May 24, 1987 (age 39) Marquette, Michigan, U.S.
- Party: Republican
- Education: Northern Michigan University
- Committees: Education

Brad Paquette (born May 24, 1987) is an American politician serving as a member of the Michigan House of Representatives since 2019, currently representing the 37th district. He is a member of the Republican Party.

== Early life and education ==
Paquette was born on May 24, 1987, in Marquette, Michigan. In 2009, Paquette graduated from Northern Michigan University, earning a B.A. in political science and pre-law. In 2012, Paquette earned a master's degree in teaching from Andrews University.

== Career ==
Paquette has worked as a public school educator, teaching at the Niles New Tech Entrepreneurial Academy. Paquette has also served on the Niles Planning Commission. On November 6, 2018, Paquette was elected to the Michigan House of Representatives, where he has been representing the 78th district ever since he was sworn in to office in 2019. As a legislator, Paquette has introduced legislation that aimed to remove concealed pistol license renewal fees. Paquette has been vocal critic of Michigan Governor Gretchen Whitmer's handling of the COVID-19 pandemic in the state of Michigan, thinking that her stay-at-home executive orders were excessive. Paquette was unopposed in the August 4, 2020, Republican primary for his seat. In the general election, Paquette is running against Democratic nominee Dan VandenHeede and Natural Law Party candidate Andrew Warner.

On October 10, 2021, Paquette co-sponsored House Bill 5444 also known as the "fetal heartbeat protection act."

In the 2022 Michigan House of Representatives election he was redistricted to the 37th district, where he won reelection.

In January 2024, in a conversation about trans healthcare with several Republican legislators, Michigan State Rep. Josh Schriver asked, "If we are going to stop this for anyone under 18, why not apply it for anyone over 18? It’s harmful across the board and that’s something we need to take into consideration in terms of the endgame." Brad Paquette and Ohio State Rep. Gary Click expressed agreement with that sentiment.

Paquette was reelected to the Michigan House of Representatives in 2024.

Political offices
| Preceded by Dave Pagel | Michigan Representatives; 78th District; 2019–2023 | Succeeded by Gina Johnsen |
| Preceded by Samantha Steckloff | Michigan Representatives; 37th District; 2023–present | Succeeded by incumbent |
