= Madron Lake =

Lake in the state of Michigan, United States

- Location within Michigan Location within the United States
- Location: Buchanan Township, Berrien County, Michigan
- Coordinates: 41°52′27″N 86°24′54″W
- Lake type: Glacial
- Primary outflows: unnamed tributary to East Branch of the Galien River
- Basin countries: United States
- Surface area: 58.638 acres (23.7 ha)
- Surface elevation: 745 ft (227 m)

Madron Lake - "a 58.638-acre (23.730 ha) " lake situated in the northwestern quadrant (Sections 8 and 9) of Buchanan Township in Berrien County, Michigan, United States. The outlet of Madron Lake drains west into the East Branch of the Galien River. Buchanan Township maintains a public boat launch off Burgoyne Road. Boats may be powered with electric engines only.

The former Wabano Council (now a District in the Southwestern Michigan Council) of Boy Scouts of America operated Camp Madron, located on the shores of Madron Lake, operated for many years as an overnight summer camp for boys. Camp Madron was closed and sold to private developers in the 1980s.

The "new" Camp Madron – a 49-unit private homeowners' association situated on 216 acres (0.87 km^{2}) – opened in 1989. It was designed by Wheeler Kearns Architects of Chicago IL.

== See also ==
- List of lakes in Michigan
