= Larry E. Burkhalter =

American politician

Member of the Michigan House of Representatives from the 78th district
- In office January 1, 1977 – December 31, 1980
- Preceded by: Roy L. Spencer
- Succeeded by: John Gregory Strand

Personal details
- Born: December 13, 1950 (age 75) Corpus Christi, Texas
- Party: Democratic
- Education: University of Michigan (BA)

Larry E. Burkhalter (born December 13, 1950) is a former member of the Michigan House of Representatives. A Democrat, he represented the 78th district from 1977 to 1980.

== Biography ==
Larry E. Burkhalter was born on December 13, 1950, in Corpus Christi, Texas. Burkhalter graduated from the University of Michigan, where he earned a BA in political science and education. He did graduate work in political science at Wayne State University. In 1970, Burkhalter married Linda, and later had three children.

Previously, Burkhalter was a member of the United Auto Workers and United Steel Workers unions. Burkhalter worked as a history teacher at Lapeer High School, starting around 1972. He also served as a freshman football coach. He was a member of the Michigan Education Association, as well as the Lapeer Education Association.

In 1974, Burkhalter announced his Democratic candidacy to represent the 78th district of the Michigan House of Representatives. Burkhalter was unopposed in the Democratic primary. His opponent in the general election was Roy L. Spencer. Spencer was seeking his ninth term in the state House. While Burkhalter was ultimately defeated, the election was closer than expected. Burkhalter received the majority of the votes in Macomb County, a more Democratic county, but also got a large number of votes in the more Republican St. Clair County.

In 1976, the year that Spencer declared his retirement, Burkhalter again ran for the 78th state House district. Burkhalter faced a challenger in the Democratic primary, Joe Curley. Curley was a veterinarian who served on the Lapeer School Board. Burkhalter received more than double Curley's vote total, with 4,558 to 2,086. In the general election, Burkhalter faced Republican nominee Fred Westendorf, a retired colonel and vice chairman of the Lapeer County Commission. On October 19, 1976, Burkhalter and Westendorf held a televised presidential style debate at Lapeer East High School. In said debate, Burkhalter supported the right of public workers, specifically teachers, to strike, if such a strike did not cause irreparable societal harm. He also opposed a proposal to cap state taxes to a percentage of income, fearing it would simply increase property tax, while cutting the state budget and local budgets. Westendorf stood against public workers striking, and was in favor of the tax proposal. Burkhalter defeated Westendorf in the general election.

During his first term, Burkhalter was appointed to the following committees: Consumers, Economic Development, House Policy, Senior Citizens and Retirement, and Social Services and Youth. He was also made majority house whip. Burkhalter introduced legislation which sought to create new penalties for the creation and distribution of child pornography. Burkhalter proposed the bill in the state House, while David Plawecki proposed the same bill in the Michigan Senate. Both bills passed through both chambers unanimously. Governor William Milliken signed the bill into law on December 31, 1977.

Burkhalter ran for re-election in 1978. His opponent in the primary election was Leo Draveling of Columbus Township, who had led a dispute against the General Telephone Company, and sought to replace the Michigan Public Service Commission with a citizens' committee less entangled with private interests. Burkhalter defeated Draveling with 76% of the vote. Burkhalter's general election opponent was Joseph Landry, a General Motors employee and Lapeer County Commissioner who had switched parties from Democrat to Republican for the state House race. Landry accused Burkhalter of supporting programs which moved money away from his own district, and toward the Detroit area. During his campaign, Burkhalter supported changing public school funding from a property tax basis to an income tax basis, while Landry opposed the proposal, stating it would limit local control of education. Burkhalter also supported Medicaid funding for abortion, which Landry opposed.

Burkhalter again ran for re-election in 1980. His Republican opponent was John Strand, a Lapeer County senior assistant prosecutor. Strand stood against Burkhalter's liberal voting record, claiming to be a more moderate voice. Burkhalter, during his campaign, continued to express interest in decoupling property tax and education funding, as well as raising the state drinking age to 19 and diversifying Michigan's economy away from the automobile industry. Burkhalter was ultimately defeated by Strand. Burkhalter blamed his loss on the swell of support for Ronald Reagan in the 1980 election, as well as his campaign by outspent by the Strand campaign. In the final days of his term, on December 30, Governor Milliken vetoed a bill Burkhalter had been involved in creating. Burkhalter had headed the Special House Committee on Job Development which had developed a bill which sought to create an Economic and Job Development Advisory Council focused on job creation and economic growth strategies.

Burkhalter ran for the 84th state House district in 1982. He defeated his opponent in the Democratic primary, George E. Lennox with 70% of the vote. He was again defeated by Strand in the general election.
