= Chain-O-Lakes, Indiana =

- Unincorporated community and Census designated place
- Location within Indiana Location within the United States
- Coordinates: 41°42′32″N 86°22′38″W
- Country: United States
- State: Indiana
- County: St. Joseph
- Township: Warren
- Elevation: 761 ft (232 m)
- Time zone: UTC-5 (Eastern (EST))
  - Summer (DST): UTC-4 (EDT)
- ZIP code: 46628
- Area code: 574
- GNIS feature ID: 2830521

Chain-O-Lakes is an unincorporated community in Warren Township, St. Joseph County, in the U.S. state of Indiana.

== History ==
The community was so named on account of there being a chain of lakes near the town site.

== Demographics ==
The United States Census Bureau delineated Chain-O-Lakes as a census designated place in the 2022 American Community Survey.
