= Pipestone Township, Michigan =

- Civil township
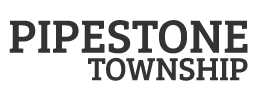
- logo

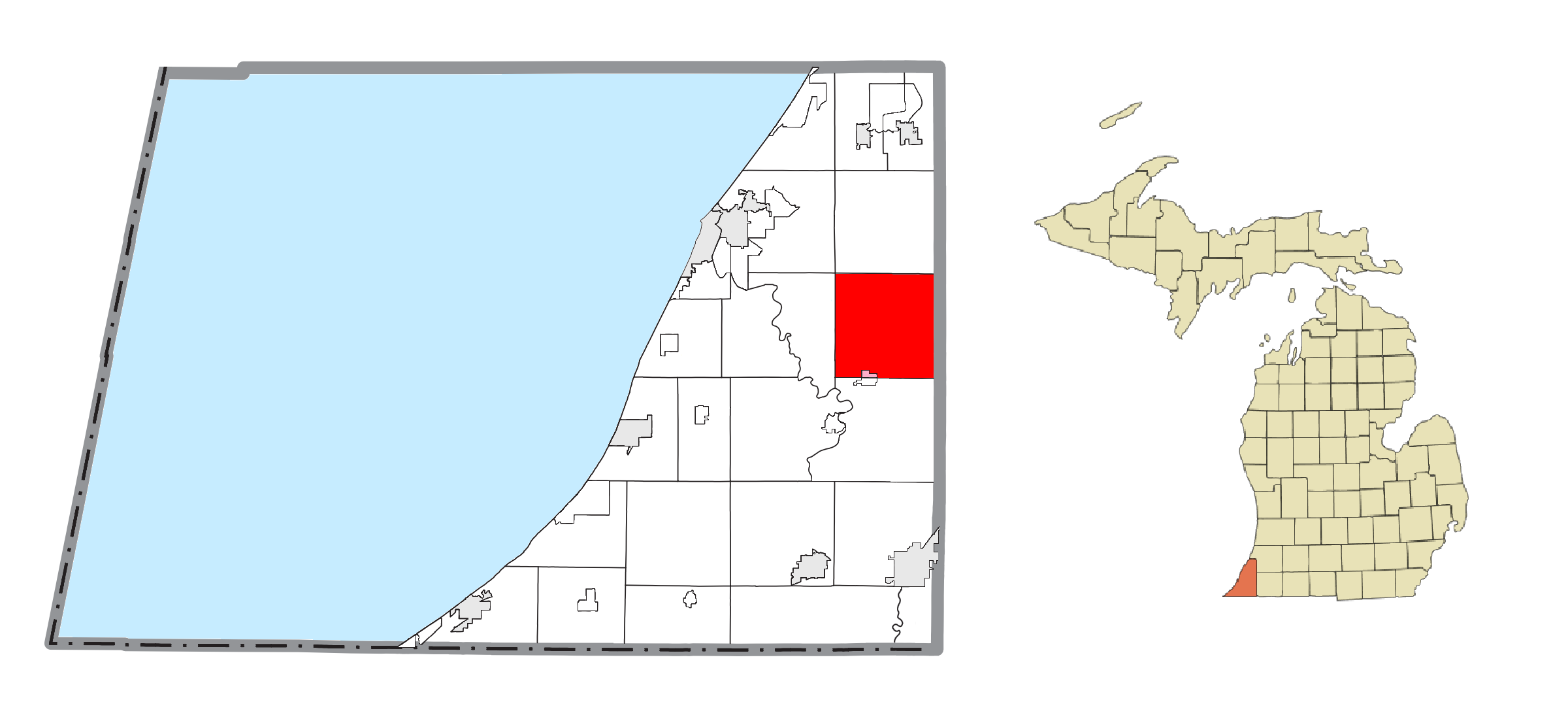
- Location within Berrien County (red) and an administered portion of the Eau Claire village (pink)

- Location within the state of Michigan Pipestone Township (the United States)
- Coordinates: 42°01′52″N 86°17′27″W
- Country: United States
- State: Michigan
- County: Berrien
- Established: 1842

Area
  - Total: 35.9 sq mi (93.0 km^{2})
  - Land: 35.5 sq mi (92.0 km^{2})
  - Water: 0.42 sq mi (1.1 km^{2})
- Elevation: 748 ft (228 m)

Population (2020)
  - Total: 2,177
- Time zone: UTC-5 (Eastern (EST))
  - Summer (DST): UTC-4 (EDT)
- ZIP code(s): 49047, 49111
- Area code: 269
- FIPS code: 26-64480
- GNIS feature ID: 1626908
- Website: Official website

Pipestone Township is a civil township of Berrien County in the U.S. state of Michigan. The population was 2,177 at the 2020 census. The township was organized on February 16, 1842.

== History ==
The first settler in the township was James Kirk, who moved with his family to Niles, Michigan, in 1833 and then established a residence in Pipestone in April 1837. In the fall of 1837, Dr. Morgan Enos moved from Bainbridge Township and settled at a point that became known as "Shanghai Corners", because, according to local history, Dr. Enos was the first to bring Shanghai chickens into the township. Joab Enos, a brother of Dr. Enos, moved into the township in 1838. He and William Boughton laid out a village known first as "Pipestone", and later as "Shanghai". Although only a few lots were sold, a post office was established in the village in 1846, and later there was a store operated by John Garrow.

The word "pipestone" refers to a red stone, known today as catlinite, which is used to make the bowls of some Indian ceremonial pipes. Pipestone Creek was so named because Native Americans have found material for making pipes along its course. The name was later extended to Pipestone Township.

== Communities ==
- The village of Eau Claire lies partially within the township and partially within Berrien Township to the south. There are no other incorporated municipalities within the township. The township is primarily agricultural.
- Pleasant Valley was a rural post office in the township at approximately 42°02′20″N 86°14′30″W from May 11, 1870, until September 18, 1874.

== Geography ==
Two tributaries of the St. Joseph River drain the township: Pipestone Creek in the north and Farmers Creek in the south. M-140 runs north–south through the township.

Sodus Township lies to the west, Benton Charter Township to the northwest, Bainbridge Township to the north, Van Buren County to the northeast, Cass County to the east, and Berrien Township to the south.

According to the United States Census Bureau, the township has a total area of 35.9 square miles (93.0 km^{2}), of which 35.5 square miles (92.0 km^{2}) is land and 0.42 square miles (1.1 km^{2}), or 1.16%, is water.

== Demographics ==
As of the census of 2000, there were 2,474 people, 842 households, and 661 families residing in the township. The population density was 69.4 inhabitants per square mile (26.8/km^{2}). There were 899 housing units at an average density of 25.2 per square mile (9.7/km^{2}). The racial makeup of the township was 90.22% White, 4.93% African American, 0.85% Native American, 0.16% Asian, 2.87% from other races, and 0.97% from two or more races. Hispanic or Latino of any race were 11.44% of the population.

There were 842 households, out of which 34.2% had children under the age of 18 living with them, 64.3% were married couples living together, 9.6% had a female householder with no husband present, and 21.4% were non-families. 18.8% of all households were made up of individuals, and 8.3% had someone living alone who was 65 years of age or older. The average household size was 2.72 and the average family size was 3.05.

In the township the population was spread out, with 26.6% under the age of 18, 8.9% from 18 to 24, 28.4% from 25 to 44, 23.0% from 45 to 64, and 13.1% who were 65 years of age or older. The median age was 37 years. For every 100 females, there were 103.0 males. For every 100 females age 18 and over, there were 102.1 males.

The median income for a household in the township was $41,440, and the median income for a family was $45,859. Males had a median income of $32,214 versus $24,432 for females. The per capita income for the township was $16,423. About 8.0% of families and 11.6% of the population were below the poverty line, including 15.9% of those under age 18 and 11.9% of those age 65 or over.
