= Chain Lake (Minnesota) =

Lake in the state of Minnesota, United States

- Location within Minnesota
- Location: Chisago County, Minnesota
- Coordinates: 45°33′11″N 93°0′14″W
- Type: Lake
- Surface elevation: 902 feet (275 m)

Chain Lake is a lake in Chisago County, Minnesota, in the United States.

Chain Lake was named from the resemblance of its outline and other nearby lakes to links of a chain.

== See also ==
- List of lakes in Minnesota
