= Sharon Tyler =

American politician

Sharon Tyler is an American politician from Michigan.

== Political career ==
Tyler represented Michigan's 78th district in the Michigan House of Representatives from 2009 to 2012.

Tyler served as the municipal clerk in Berrien County.

In August 2020, it was announced that Tyler would lead the state association of county clerks.
