= Three Oaks Township, Michigan =

- Civil township
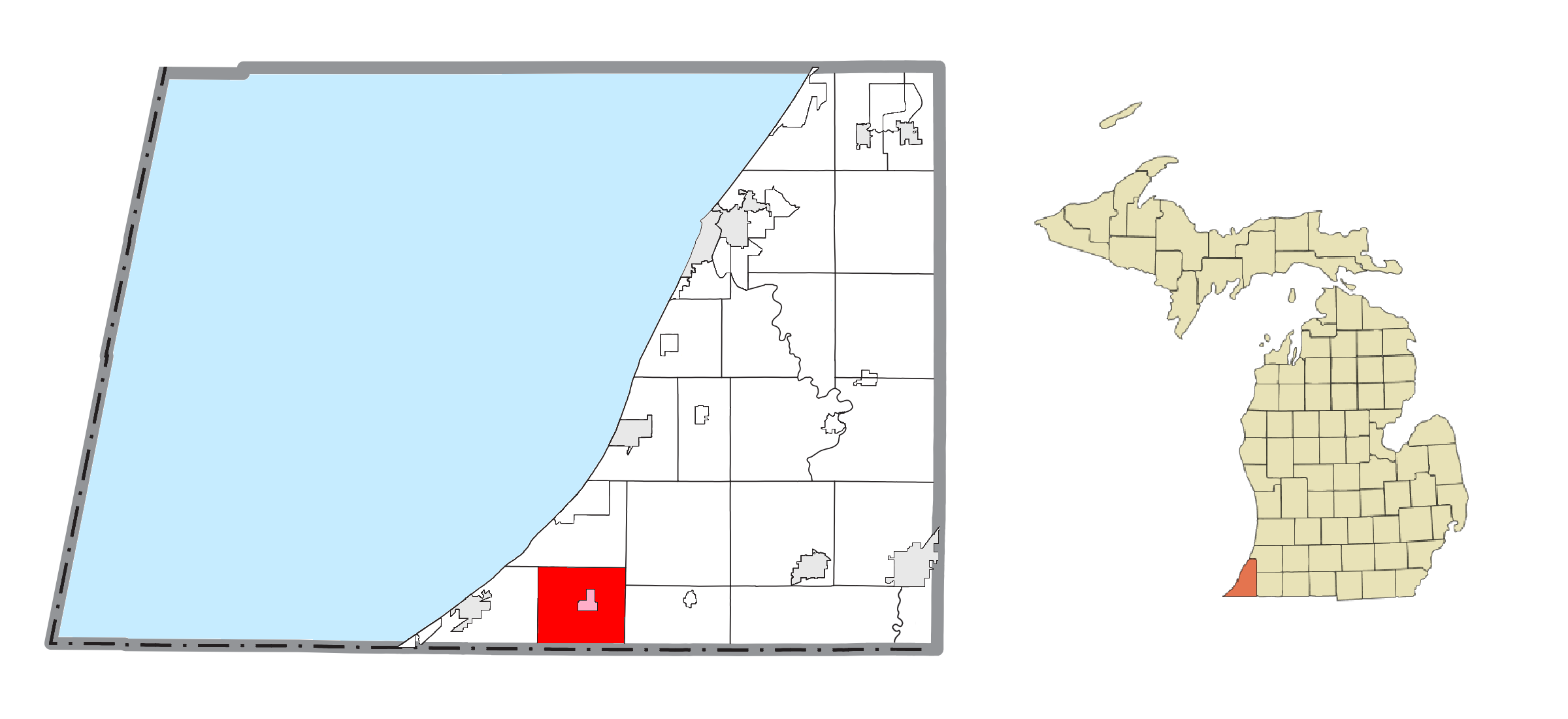
- Location within Berrien County (red) and the administered village of Three Oaks (pink)

- Location within the state of Michigan Three Oaks Township (the United States)
- Coordinates: 41°47′54″N 86°36′55″W
- Country: United States
- State: Michigan
- County: Berrien

Area
  - Total: 23.5 sq mi (60.8 km^{2})
  - Land: 23.3 sq mi (60.3 km^{2})
  - Water: 0.19 sq mi (0.5 km^{2})
- Elevation: 679 ft (207 m)

Population (2020)
  - Total: 2,324
- Time zone: UTC-5 (Eastern (EST))
  - Summer (DST): UTC-4 (EDT)
- ZIP code(s): 49128
- Area code: 269
- FIPS code: 26-79740
- GNIS feature ID: 1627163
- Website: Official website

Three Oaks Township is a civil township of Berrien County in the U.S. state of Michigan on the border with the state of Indiana. The population was 2,324 at the 2020 census.

The village of Three Oaks is the only incorporated community within the township.

US 12 crosses east–west through the township. The South Branch Galien River flows through the western part of the township.

== Geography ==
According to the United States Census Bureau, the township has a total area of 23.5 square miles (60.8 km^{2}), of which 23.3 square miles (60.3 km^{2}) is land and 0.19 square miles (0.5 km^{2}), or 0.79%, is water.

== Demographics ==
At the 2000 census there were 2,949 people, 1,181 households, and 816 families in the township. The population density was 126.1 inhabitants per square mile (48.7/km^{2}). There were 1,284 housing units at an average density of 54.9 per square mile (21.2/km^{2}). The racial makeup of the township was 96.81% White, 0.88% African American, 0.47% Native American, 0.10% Asian, 0.41% from other races, and 1.32% from two or more races. Hispanic or Latino of any race were 1.63%.

Of the 1,181 households, 31.6% had children under the age of 18 living with them, 53.6% were married couples living together, 11.1% had a female householder with no husband present, and 30.9% were non-families. 26.1% of households were one person, and 11.2% were one person aged 65 or older. The average household size was 2.50 and the average family size was 3.02.

In the township the population was spread out, with 25.6% under the age of 18, 8.3% from 18 to 24, 27.8% from 25 to 44, 24.3% from 45 to 64, and 14.0% 65 or older. The median age was 37 years. For every 100 females, there were 97.1 males. For every 100 females age 18 and over, there were 93.2 males.

The median household income was $36,989 and the median family income was $45,302. Males had a median income of $31,908 versus $21,745 for females. The per capita income for the township was $17,901. About 7.1% of families and 9.9% of the population were below the poverty line, including 15.3% of those under age 18 and 3.9% of those age 65 or over.
