= Weesaw Township, Michigan =

- Civil township
- logo

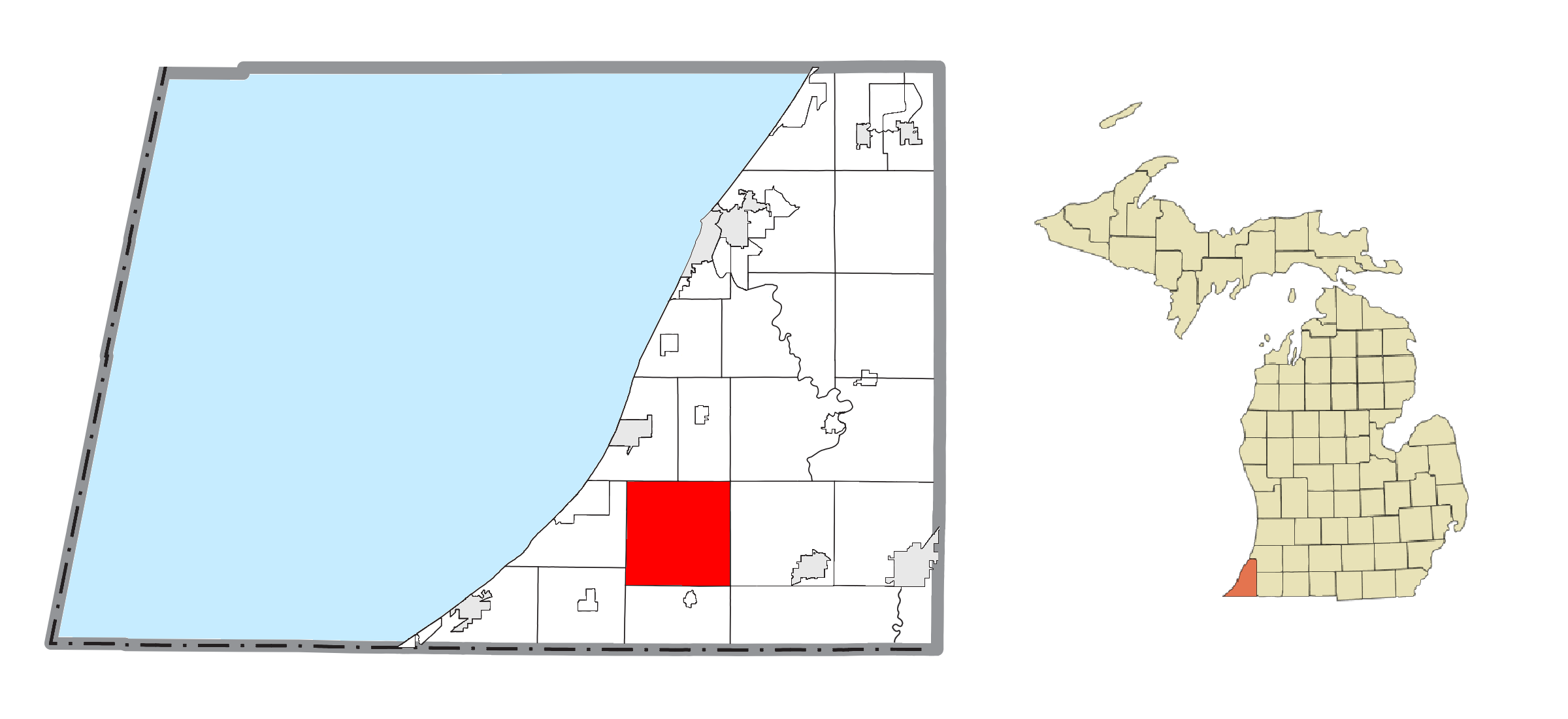
- Location within Berrien County

- Location within the state of Michigan Weesaw Township (the United States)
- Coordinates: 41°51′36″N 86°31′24″W
- Country: United States
- State: Michigan
- County: Berrien

Area
  - Total: 35.6 sq mi (92.2 km^{2})
  - Land: 35.4 sq mi (91.8 km^{2})
  - Water: 0.15 sq mi (0.4 km^{2})
- Elevation: 653 ft (199 m)

Population (2020)
  - Total: 1,832
- Time zone: UTC-5 (Eastern (EST))
  - Summer (DST): UTC-4 (EDT)
- ZIP code(s): 49107, 49113, 49119, 49125, 49128
- Area code: 269
- FIPS code: 26-85120
- GNIS feature ID: 1627238
- Website: Official website

Weesaw Township is a civil township of Berrien County in the U.S. state of Michigan. The population was 1,832 at the 2020 census. The township was organized in 1837, and was named after Weesaw, a local Potawatomi chief.

== Communities ==
- New Troy is an unincorporated community and census-designated place located on the east branch of the Galien River between sections 7 and 8 of the township. It is at 41°52′35″N 86°32′59″W. The ZIP code is 49119, and the FIPS place code is 57660.
- Glendora is an unincorporated community at 41°53′06″N 86°29′13″W in sections 2, 3, 10, and 11 of the township, about 10 miles (16 km) northwest of Niles and 15 miles (24 km) south of St. Joseph. About 6 miles (9 km) south of Baroda. 9 miles (14 km) northwest of Buchanan. The ZIP code is 49107, and the FIPS place code is 32440. It was founded in 1890 and had a post office from 1891 until 1966. The name "Glendora" was assigned by railroad officials.

== Geography ==
According to the United States Census Bureau, the township has a total area of 35.6 square miles (92.2 km^{2}), of which 35.4 square miles (91.8 km^{2}) is land and 0.15 square miles (0.4 km^{2}), or 0.44%, is water.

== Demographics ==
As of the census of 2000, there were 2,065 people, 798 households, and 589 families residing in the township. The population density was 58.1 inhabitants per square mile (22.4/km^{2}). There were 886 housing units at an average density of 24.9 per square mile (9.6/km^{2}). The racial makeup of the township was 94.72% White, 0.10% African American, 0.48% Native American, 0.24% Asian, 3.39% from other races, and 1.07% from two or more races. Hispanic or Latino of any race were 4.02% of the population.

There were 798 households, out of which 29.7% had children under the age of 18 living with them, 60.7% were married couples living together, 7.5% had a female householder with no husband present, and 26.1% were non-families. 21.3% of all households were made up of individuals, and 8.4% had someone living alone who was 65 years of age or older. The average household size was 2.56 and the average family size was 2.95.

In the township the population was spread out, with 23.9% under the age of 18, 7.5% from 18 to 24, 29.6% from 25 to 44, 25.5% from 45 to 64, and 13.5% who were 65 years of age or older. The median age was 39 years. For every 100 females, there were 103.8 males. For every 100 females age 18 and over, there were 104.6 males.

The median income for a household in the township was $41,434, and the median income for a family was $45,511. Males had a median income of $34,625 versus $22,083 for females. The per capita income for the township was $18,159. About 5.0% of families and 6.6% of the population were below the poverty line, including 8.3% of those under age 18 and 6.7% of those age 65 or over.
