= Lakeshore Public Schools (Berrien County, Michigan) =

School district in Michigan

Address
- 5771 Cleveland Avenue Stevensville, Berrien, Michigan, 49127; United States

District information
- Grades: Pre-Kindergarten-12
- Superintendent: Greg Eding
- Schools: 5
- Budget: $40,682,000 2022-2023 expenditures
- NCES District ID: 2620820

Students and staff
- Students: 2,635 (2024-2025)
- Teachers: 162.02 (on an FTE basis) (2024-2025)
- Staff: 358.38 FTE (2024-2025)
- Student–teacher ratio: 16.26 (2024-2025)
- Athletic conference: Southwest Michigan Athletic Conference
- District mascot: Lancers
- Colors: Red and white

Other information
- Website: www.lakeshoreschools.k12.mi.us

Lakeshore Public Schools is a public school district in Southwestern Lower Michigan. It serves Stevensville, Baroda, part of Shoreham, and parts of Baroda Township, Lake Township, Lincoln Township, Royalton Township, and St. Joseph Township in Berrien County.

== History ==
A public school was established in Stevensville by 1889. A new high school was built in 1924. In 1954, a new elementary school was built near the high school, which included a gym with seating for 1,000 spectators to be used by the high school.

Baroda had a high school by at least 1894, when it is mentioned in The Herald-Palladium newspaper. It only went to grade ten until 1901, when eleventh grade was added. At the time it had 110 students. Students were graduating from Baroda by at least 1919.

Lakeshore Public Schools was formed in 1957 from several small districts, including Hollywood, Stewart, Evans, Baroda, Stevensville, and others. Stevensville High School and Baroda High School then merged to form Lakeshore High School. Between 1957 and 1959, Lakeshore High School occupied the former Stevensville High School.

The current Lakeshore High School opened in fall 1959. The architect was Guido A. Binda.

Stevensville Elementary School, occupying two buildings (one formerly Stevensville High School), was closed in 1979 and demolished in 2011. Another elementary school, Baroda Elementary School (formerly Baroda High School), was closed in 1981 and demolished in 2006.

== Schools ==
Schools in Lakeshore Public Schools District
School	Address	Notes
Lakeshore High School	5771 Cleveland Ave., Stevensville	Grades 9–12
Lakeshore Middle School	1459 W. John Beers, Stevensville	Grades 6–8
Hollywood Elementary School	143 E. John Beers, Stevensville	Grades PreK-5
Roosevelt Elementary School	2000 El Dorado, Stevensville	Grades PreK-5
Stewart Elementary School	2750 Orchard Lane, Stevensville	Grades PreK-5

== See also ==
- List of school districts in Michigan
