= Bridgman Public Schools =

School district in Michigan

Address
- 9964 Gast Road Bridgman, Berrien County, Michigan, 49106; United States

District information
- Grades: PreKindergarten–12
- Superintendent: Shane Peters
- Schools: 3
- Budget: $17,414,000 2022-2023 expenditures
- NCES District ID: 2606840

Students and staff
- Students: 810 (2024-2025)
- Teachers: 63.06 (on an FTE basis) (2024-2025)
- Staff: 122.91 FTE (2024-2025)
- Student–teacher ratio: 12.84 (2024-2025)

Other information
- Website: www.bridgmanschools.com

Bridgman Public Schools is a public school district in Berrien County, in West Michigan. It serves Bridgman and parts of the townships of Baroda, Lake, and Lincoln.

== History ==
The former Bridgman High School opened in fall 1922, following the consolidation of schools in the area. The old Bridgman School that it replaced was sold.

Bridgman Elementary opened in November 1958, and its gymnasium was completed in January 1959.

The current high school opened in fall 1971, and the 1922 high school building became the district's middle school. It was named for Frederick Reed, the district's superintendent from 1922 to 1951. Between 1970 and 1976, district enrollment increased from 814 to 977, and the district requested a bond issue to replace the Reed building. Voters passed the bond issue and the current Reed Middle School opened in fall 1978. The building was designed by Daverman and Associates of Grand Rapids.

Bond issues to improve district technology and facilities were passed in 2009 and 2011. A renovation of the district's swimming pool is planned for 2026.

== Schools ==
Schools in Bridgman Public Schools district
School	Address	Notes
Bridgman High School	9964 Gast Road, Bridgman	Grades 9–12. Built 1971.
F.C. Reed Middle School	10254 California, Bridgman	Grades 5–8. Built 1976.
Bridgman Elementary	3891 Lake Street, Bridgman	Grades PreK-4. Built 1958.
