= St. Joseph Public Schools =

School district in Michigan

Address
- 2580 S. Cleveland Avenue St. Joseph, Berrien, Michigan, 49085; United States

District information
- Grades: Pre-Kindergarten-12
- Superintendent: Kristen Bawks
- Schools: 5
- Budget: $46,939,000 2022-2023 expenditures
- NCES District ID: 2632850

Students and staff
- Students: 2,930 (2024-2025)
- Teachers: 149.89 (on an FTE basis) (2024-2025)
- Staff: 335.12 FTE (2024-2025)
- Student–teacher ratio: 19.55 (2024-2025)

Other information
- Website: www.sjschools.org

St. Joseph Public Schools is a public school district in Berrien County, Michigan. It serves St. Joseph and parts of Shoreham, Lincoln Township, Royalton Township, and St. Joseph Township.

== History ==
St. Joseph had a union school district, which built Union School in 1872. It housed all grades, including the high school in the third floor and attic, and lower grades on the first two floors. In 1916, a dedicated high school was built on Niles Avenue. It opened in 1917 and was expanded in 1936. That same year, Washington Elementary, which had been using the old Union School, was rebuilt on its same site. Its construction was funded by the Works Progress Administration.

The present St. Joseph High School, designed by architect Eberle M. Smith, opened in the fall of 1959 and housed grades ten through twelve. Grades seven through nine remained at the previous high school building, renamed Milton Junior High. The high school was expanded in 1968. A fieldhouse opened at the high school in April 2004. A commons area and extensive renovations were completed in 2013.

Upton Middle School opened in fall 1969. It was named for St. Joseph residents Louis Upton and his brother, Frederick. Originally a junior high school, it became a middle school in fall of 1986 with the inclusion of sixth grade.

The site of the 1917 high school, and later Milton Junior High, became Milton Park after the building was torn down in March 1977. Washington Elementary was ultimately closed and, in 1986, was renovated to become the corporate headquarters of KitchenAid. It then became the administration center for Berrien County.

== Schools ==
Schools in St. Joseph Public Schools district
School	Address	Notes
Brown Elementary	2027 Brown School Road, St. Joseph	Grades PreK-5.
E. P. Clarke Elementary	515 East Glenlord Rd., St. Joseph	Grades PreK-5.
Lincoln Elementary	1102 Orchard Ave., St. Joseph	Grades PreK-5.
Upton Middle School	800 Maiden Lane, St. Joseph	Grades 6–8.
St. Joseph High School	2521 Stadium Drive, St. Joseph	Grades 9–12. Built 1959.
