= Ralf Mojsiejenko =

German gridiron football player (born 1963)

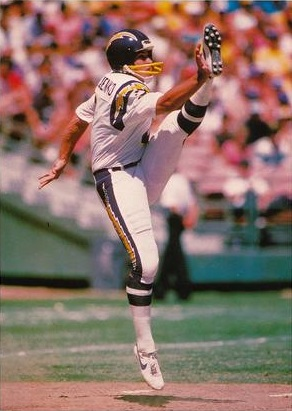
- Mojsiejenko c. 1985

No. 2
- Position: Punter

Personal information
- Born: January 28, 1963 (age 63); Salzgitter, West Germany
- Listed height: 6 ft 3 in (1.91 m)
- Listed weight: 209 lb (95 kg)

Career information
- High school: Bridgman (Bridgman, Michigan)
- College: Michigan State
- NFL draft: 1985: 4th round, 96th overall pick

Career history
- San Diego Chargers (1985–1988); Washington Redskins (1989–1990); San Francisco 49ers (1991)

Awards and highlights
- Second-team All-Pro (1987); Pro Bowl (1987); 2× Second-team All-Big Ten (1983, 1984)

Career NFL statistics
- Punts: 413
- Punting yards: 17,533
- Punt average: 42.5
- Stats at Pro Football Reference

Ralf Mojsiejenko (born January 28, 1963) is a former American football punter in the National Football League (NFL) from 1985 to 1991 for three teams. He was selected by the San Diego Chargers in the fourth round of the 1985 NFL draft. He played college football at Michigan State University. Of Ukrainian descent, he came to the United States when he was nine months old. He currently resides in his childhood hometown of Bridgman, Michigan with his wife Mary, daughter Alexandra, and two sons Parker and Cooper. Ralf's youngest son Cooper, attributable, followed Ralf's punting and kicking skillset competing at Central Michigan University for four years.

As a college kicker, his first field-goal attempt of his career was a successful 61-yarder in 1982 against the University of Illinois.

== NFL career statistics ==
Regular season

Season	Team	GP	Punting					
Season	Team	GP	Punts	Yards	Y/P	Net	In20	TB
1985	SD	16	68	2,881	42.4	35.7	15	9
1986	SD	16	72	3,026	42.0	32.9	15	11
1987	SD	12	67	2,875	42.9	33.5	15	12
1988	SD	16	85	3,745	44.1	34.5	22	11
1989	WAS	16	62	2,663	43.0	33.3	21	9
1990	WAS	12	43	1,687	39.2	34.2	17	0
1991	SF	5	16	656	41.0	29.7	0	4
Career		93	413	17,533	42.5	33.9	105	56
