= Grand Mere State Park =

Park in Michigan, USA

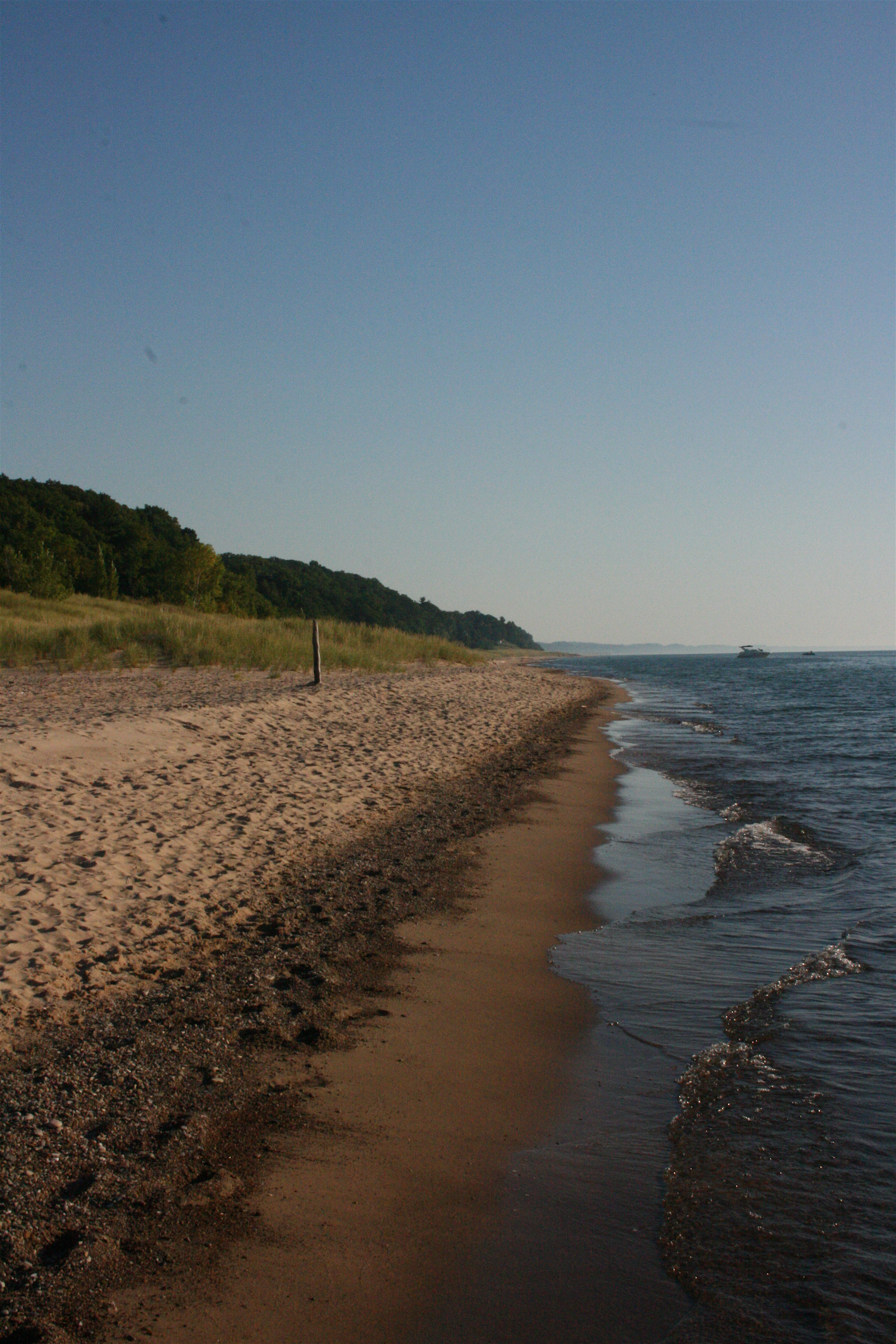
- Beach at Grand Mere

- Location within Michigan Location within the United States
- Location: Lincoln Township, Berrien County, Michigan, United States
- Nearest town: Stevensville, Michigan
- Coordinates: 42°00′29″N 86°32′39″W
- Area: 1,100 acres (450 ha)
- Elevation: 581 feet (177 m)
- Established: 1973
- Administrator: Michigan Department of Natural Resources
- Designation: Michigan State Park
- Website: Official website

U.S. National Natural Landmark
- Designated: 1968

Grand Mere State Park is a public recreation and nature preservation area in the southwestern part of the U.S. state of Michigan near Stevensville. The state park is located adjacent to Interstate 94. Protected from Lake Michigan by the dunes to the west, the park has many natural features not found throughout the rest of the state. In 1968 it was designated a National Natural Landmark.

== Geography ==
The 1,100-acre (4.5 km^{2}) park is mostly wooded and has three geologically ancient inland lakes, left behind as the glaciers receded during the last ice age. At one time there were five such lakes, but two of the lakes have disappeared as a result of aquatic succession, and the remaining three can be seen to be slowly disappearing today.

The dunes protecting the park also create a relatively cool environment that supports plants not normally seen in southern Michigan, some of which are classified as rare, threatened or endangered.

== Activities and amenities ==
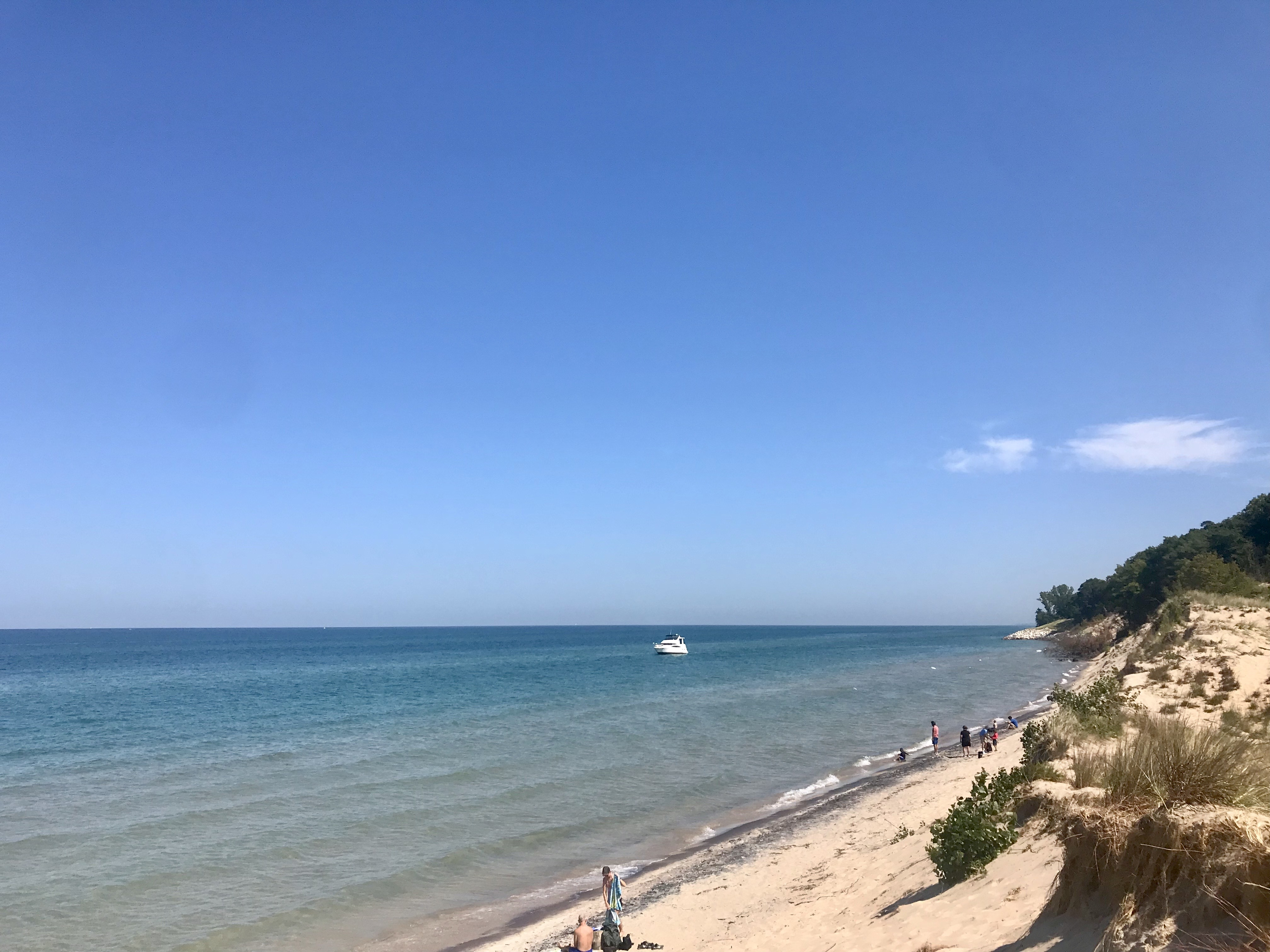
The Lake Michigan shoreline at Grand Mere State Park

The park offers swimming, hiking, picnicking, boat launch, and cross-country skiing.

The park has almost two miles of sandy beach, which can be reached only on foot by climbing over steep sand dunes. There are many trails for hiking and cross-country skiing, but most are neither posted nor maintained. (Biking on the trails is prohibited.) The trail conditions vary from loose sand to hard packed dirt. There are many hills including a large sand dune that was once used for off-road vehicles. Access to the dune by large, four-wheeled vehicles has been blocked with guard rails.
