= Jerry Planutis =

American football player (1930–2021)

No. 42
- Position: Halfback

Personal information
- Born: May 18, 1930; Detroit, Michigan, U.S.
- Died: May 20, 2021 (aged 91); St. Joseph, Michigan, U.S.

Career information
- College: Michigan State
- NFL draft: 1956: 12th round, 141st overall pick

Career history
- Washington Redskins (1956)

Awards and highlights
- National champion (1952); First-team All-Big Ten (1955)

Career NFL statistics
- Games played: 3
- Rushing yards: 6
- Average: 3
- Stats at Pro Football Reference

Gerald Robert Planutis (born May 18, 1930 – May 20, 2021) was an American professional football halfback in the National Football League (NFL) for the Washington Redskins. He played college football at Michigan State University and was drafted in the 12th round of the 1956 NFL draft. Planutis attended West Hazleton High School and served in the United States Army. During his period in Free Territory of Trieste, he played football with a local team. He later appeared in two Rose Bowl games for the Spartans, and was head football coach at John Adams High School in South Bend, IN. He also head coached at Bridgman High School in Bridgman, Michigan. He resided in Bridgman, where he was commonly referred to as "Coach."
