= Wesley French =

American football player (born 1996)

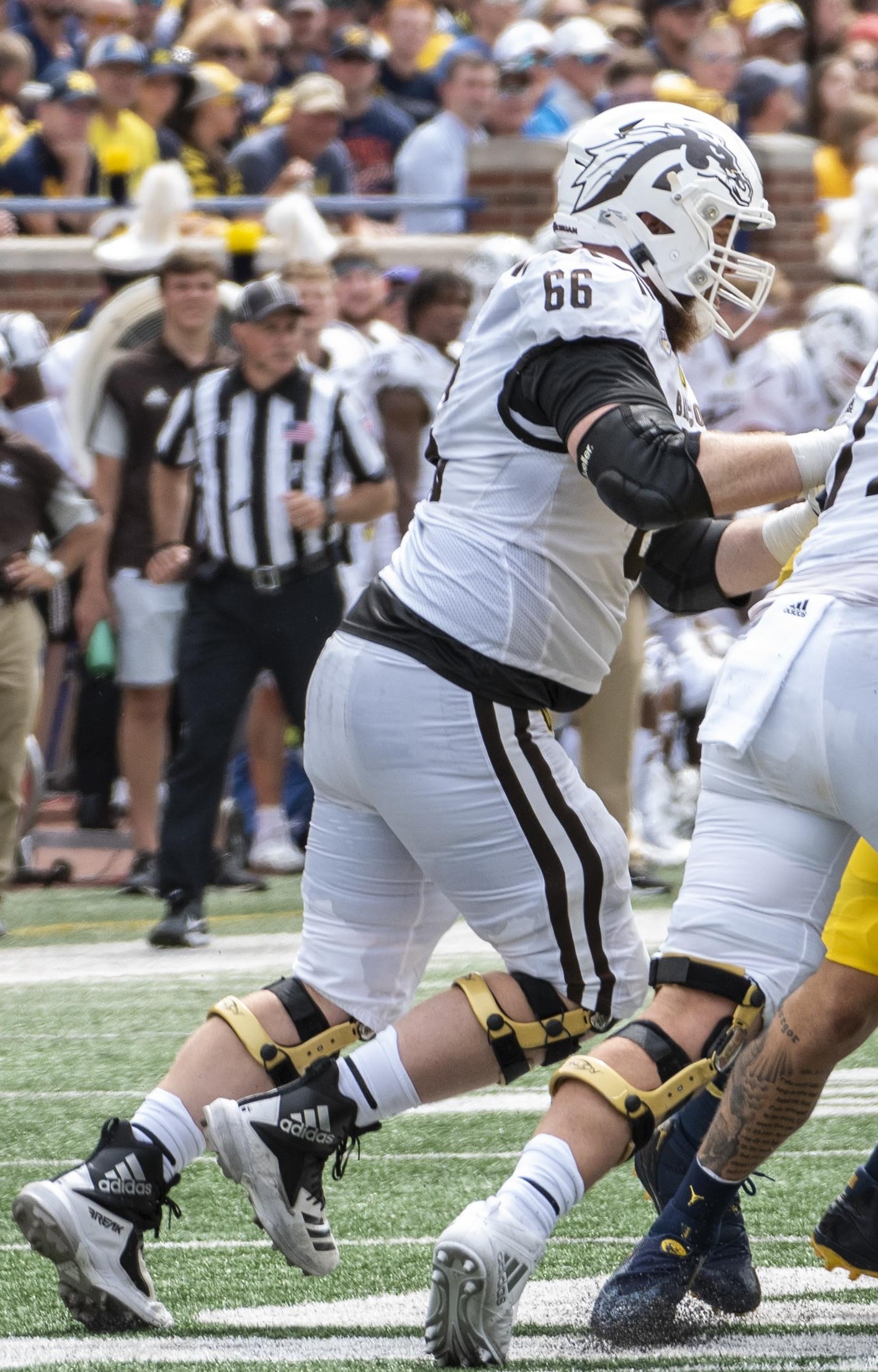
- French with Western Michigan in 2021

Profile
- Position: Center

Personal information
- Born: November 30, 1996 (age 29); St. Joseph, Michigan, U.S.
- Listed height: 6 ft 4 in (1.93 m)
- Listed weight: 307 lb (139 kg)

Career information
- High school: St. Joseph (MI)
- College: Western Michigan (2015–2021)
- NFL draft: 2022: undrafted

Career history
- Indianapolis Colts (2022–2024); Dallas Cowboys (2025)*; Cleveland Browns (2025)*; Chicago Bears (2026)*
- * Offseason or practice squad member only

Career NFL statistics as of 2023
- Games played: 17
- Games started: 3
- Stats at Pro Football Reference

Wesley M. French (born November 30, 1996) is an American professional football center. He spent seven years playing college football at Western Michigan seeing game action during five of those seasons both as a defensive tackle and offensive lineman.

French was signed by general manager Chris Ballard of the Colts as an undrafted free agent in 2022. After failing to see game action during his 2022 rookie year, French made his first career NFL start on September 24, 2023, on the road against the Baltimore Ravens.

== Early life ==
Wesley M. French was born November 30, 1996, in St. Joseph, Michigan, located in the western part of the state. He was active in athletics from an early age, participating in wrestling and football.

French attended St. Joseph High School, playing offensive tackle for the Bears. By the end of his high school days French had added several inches of height and 25 pounds of muscle, listing at 6'5" tall and 300 pounds, sufficient in skill, strength, and size to attract the scholarship attention of a number of universities, including the University of Illinois, Iowa State University, and San Diego State University, and at least eight schools from the Midwest Athletic Conference.

In December 2014, French decided to accept the scholarship offer of Western Michigan University, located in Kalamazoo, where he enrolled as a freshman in the fall of 2015.

== College career ==
French's collegiate career with the Western Michigan Broncos proved to be lengthy, lasting seven years in all.

He did not see game action as a Freshman in 2015, thereby retaining the year of eligibility. He finally cracked the lineup in 2016, playing in four games for a Western Michigan team regarded as among the school's best ever, finishing the regular season with an undefeated 12–0 record before falling to the University of Wisconsin in the January 2017 Cotton Bowl Classic.

As a sophomore in the 2017 season, French was again relegated to reserve duty, appearing for just 35 snaps over the course of three games, including a contest against the #4 ranked University of Southern California.

French was moved to the defensive side of the ball for the 2018 season, starting four times and playing in all 13 games as a defensive tackle. French was on the field for a total of 347 snaps in the season, recording 22 tackles (1.5 tackles for loss) for the team.

French's ostensible junior season in 2019 was over before it began, however, as he suffered as season-ending foot injury during football camp. Nevertheless, the year was not a total loss, since the academically-gifted French graduated from Western Michigan with a bachelor's degree in interdisciplinary health services in June of that year. He was awarded a red shirt for the year, allowing another year of collegiate eligibility.

In 2020, the year of COVID, French — now studying for a master's of business administration at Western Michigan — was again moved to the offense. He started all six games for the school at center in this truncated season, playing 397 snaps without allowing either a sack or a quarterback hit. The Broncos finished 16th among FBS schools in total offense and 10th in sacks allowed, giving up just 7 quarterback sacks for the year.

Granted an extra year of collegiate eligibility due to the COVID epidemic, French returned to the S Western Michigan campus for a seventh year in 2021. He started all 13 games for the Broncos at center, being named to the Academic All-MAC team and helping to lead the team to a victory over the University of Nevada in the 2021 Quick Lane Bowl.

== Professional career ==
Pre-draft measurables
Height	Weight	Arm length	Hand span	Wingspan	40-yard dash	10-yard split	20-yard split	20-yard shuttle	Three-cone drill	Vertical jump	Broad jump	Bench press
6 ft 4 7/8 in (1.95 m)	307 lb (139 kg)	33 1/2 in (0.85 m)	10 1/8 in (0.26 m)	6 ft 9 3/4 in (2.08 m)	5.19 s	1.81 s	2.95 s	4.62 s	7.28 s	29.0 in (0.74 m)	9 ft 2 in (2.79 m)	28 reps
All values from Pro Day

=== Indianapolis Colts ===
On April 30, 2022, French signed with the Indianapolis Colts as an undrafted free agent, following the 2022 NFL draft. He signed a 3-year, $2.57 million contract with the club with a guaranteed signing bonus of $10,000. French did not see game action with the Colts during the 2022 season.

French was named to the Colts' 53 man roster in 2023, seeing action during the first two games of the year. Following an injury to Colts' starting center Ryan Kelly, French made his first career start in the NFL on September 24, 2023, in a game against the Baltimore Ravens.

On August 7, 2024, French was placed on injured reserve after undergoing season-ending ankle surgery.

On March 12, 2025, French re-signed with the Colts on a one-year contract. He was waived on August 26 as part of final roster cuts.

=== Dallas Cowboys ===
On September 17, 2025, French signed with the Dallas Cowboys' practice squad. He was waived on November 18.

=== Cleveland Browns ===
On December 17, 2025, French was signed to the Cleveland Browns' practice squad.

=== Birmingham Stallions ===
On January 14, 2026, French was selected by the Birmingham Stallions of the United Football League (UFL).

=== Chicago Bears ===
On August 11, 2026, French signed with the Chicago Bears. He was released by the Bears as a part of final roster cuts on August 30.
