= Baroda Township, Michigan =

- Civil township
- Seal

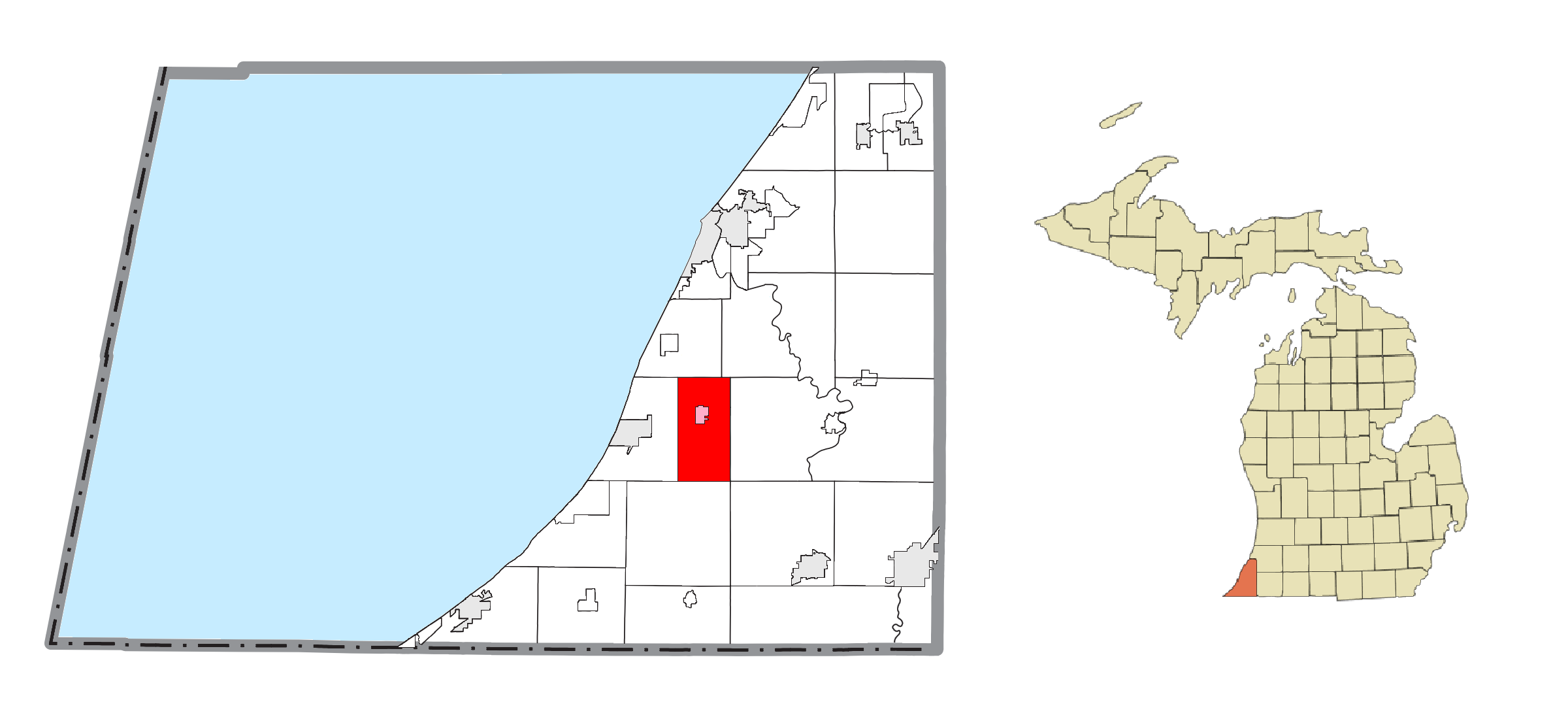
- Location within Berrien County (red) and the administered village of Baroda (pink)

- Location within the state of Michigan Baroda Township (the United States)
- Coordinates: 41°56′42″N 86°29′18″W
- Country: United States
- State: Michigan
- County: Berrien
- Established: 1923

Area
  - Total: 17.8 sq mi (46.2 km^{2})
  - Land: 17.8 sq mi (46.0 km^{2})
  - Water: 0.077 sq mi (0.2 km^{2})
- Elevation: 646 ft (197 m)

Population (2020)
  - Total: 2,835
- Time zone: UTC-5 (Eastern (EST))
  - Summer (DST): UTC-4 (EDT)
- ZIP code(s): 49101
- Area code: 269
- FIPS code: 26-05520
- GNIS feature ID: 1625884
- Website: Official website

Baroda Township is a civil township of Berrien County in the U.S. state of Michigan. As of the 2020 census, the township population was 2,835.

== Communities ==
The village of Baroda is the principal population center in the township. Tensions between the communities of Baroda and Bridgman led to Baroda Township being split off from Lake Township in 1923.

== Geography ==
According to the United States Census Bureau, the township has a total area of 17.8 square miles (46.2 km^{2}), of which 17.8 square miles (46.0 km^{2}) is land and 0.077 square miles (0.2 km^{2}), or 0.36%, is water.

The township is in the central portion of the county, with Lake Charter Township and Bridgman to the west, Lincoln Charter Township and Stevensville to the north and northwest, Royalton Township to the northeast, Oronoko Charter Township and Berrien Springs to the east, Buchanan Township to the southeast, and Weesaw Township to the south and southwest.

== Demographics ==
As of the census of 2000, there were 2,880 people, 1,117 households, and 815 families residing in the township. The population density was 161.8 inhabitants per square mile (62.5/km^{2}). There were 1,172 housing units at an average density of 65.9 per square mile (25.4/km^{2}). The racial makeup of the township was 96.42% White, 0.24% African American, 0.24% Native American, 0.35% Asian, 0.07% Pacific Islander, 2.01% from other races, and 0.66% from two or more races. Hispanic or Latino of any race were 2.57% of the population.

There were 1,117 households, out of which 34.3% had children under the age of 18 living with them, 61.2% were married couples living together, 8.3% had a female householder with no husband present, and 27.0% were non-families. 22.4% of all households were made up of individuals, and 7.3% had someone living alone who was 65 years of age or older. The average household size was 2.54 and the average family size was 2.99.

In the township the population was spread out, with 26.5% under the age of 18, 6.2% from 18 to 24, 30.6% from 25 to 44, 23.6% from 45 to 64, and 13.0% who were 65 years of age or older. The median age was 38 years. For every 100 females, there were 100.6 males. For every 100 females age 18 and over, there were 98.5 males.

The median income for a household in the township was $44,219, and the median income for a family was $47,161. Males had a median income of $35,350 versus $25,571 for females. The per capita income for the township was $21,837. About 2.2% of families and 4.7% of the population were below the poverty line, including 4.5% of those under age 18 and 7.4% of those age 65 or over.
