= St. Joseph High School (St. Joseph, Michigan) =

Public High School in St. Joseph, Michigan in the United States

Location
- 2521 Stadium Drive; St. Joseph, Michigan 49085; United States; 42°05′25″N 86°29′32″W

Information
- Type: Public
- School district: St. Joseph Public Schools
- Principal: Joe Rommel
- Teaching staff: 47.64 (on an FTE basis)
- Grades: 9–12
- Enrollment: 942 (2023-2024)
- Student to teacher ratio: 19.77
- Colors: Maize and blue
- Nickname: Bears
- Rival: Lakeshore High School
- Newspaper: Wind-up sjhswindup.com
- Website: www.sjschools.org/o/sjhs

Student assessments
- 2021–22 school year Change vs. prior year

M-STEP 11th grade proficiency rates (Science / Social Studies)
- Advanced %: 29.0 / 18.9
- Proficient %: 29.0 / 34.5
- PR. Proficient %: 13.9 / 37.4
- Not Proficient %: 28.2 / 9.2

Average test scores
- SAT Total: 1073.1 (▲ +3)

St. Joseph High School is a public high school located in St. Joseph, Michigan, United States. It is the only high school in the St. Joseph Public Schools district.

== Athletics ==
- Baseball
- Basketball
  - Boys State Champions: 1953, 1951, 1948, 1946, 1931, 1926, 1921, 1920
- Cheerleading
- Cross country
  - Boys State Champions: 1988, 1971
- Football
- Golf
  - Boys State Champions: 1947, 1946, 1939
- Soccer
- Softball
- Swimming State Champions 2012
- Tennis
  - Boys State Champions: 2007, 1949, 1939
- Track and field
  - Boys State Champions: 2023, 1997, 1957, 1945, 1939, 1932, 1927
  - Girls State Champions: 1979
- Volleyball
- Wrestling

== Notable alumni ==
- Jordan Brewer – current professional baseball player (Houston Astros)
- Dave Carlock – record producer, songwriter and multi-instrumentalist
- Nina Davuluri – Miss America 2014
- Rob Fredrickson – former NFL football player
- Wesley French - current NFL player (Indianapolis Colts)
- James Frey – writer
- Ernie Koob – former MLB player (St. Louis Browns)
- Kenneth Marshall – actor
- Jay Schadler – news reporter (Primetime and 20/20)
