= Lincoln Charter Township, Michigan =

- Charter township
- Seal

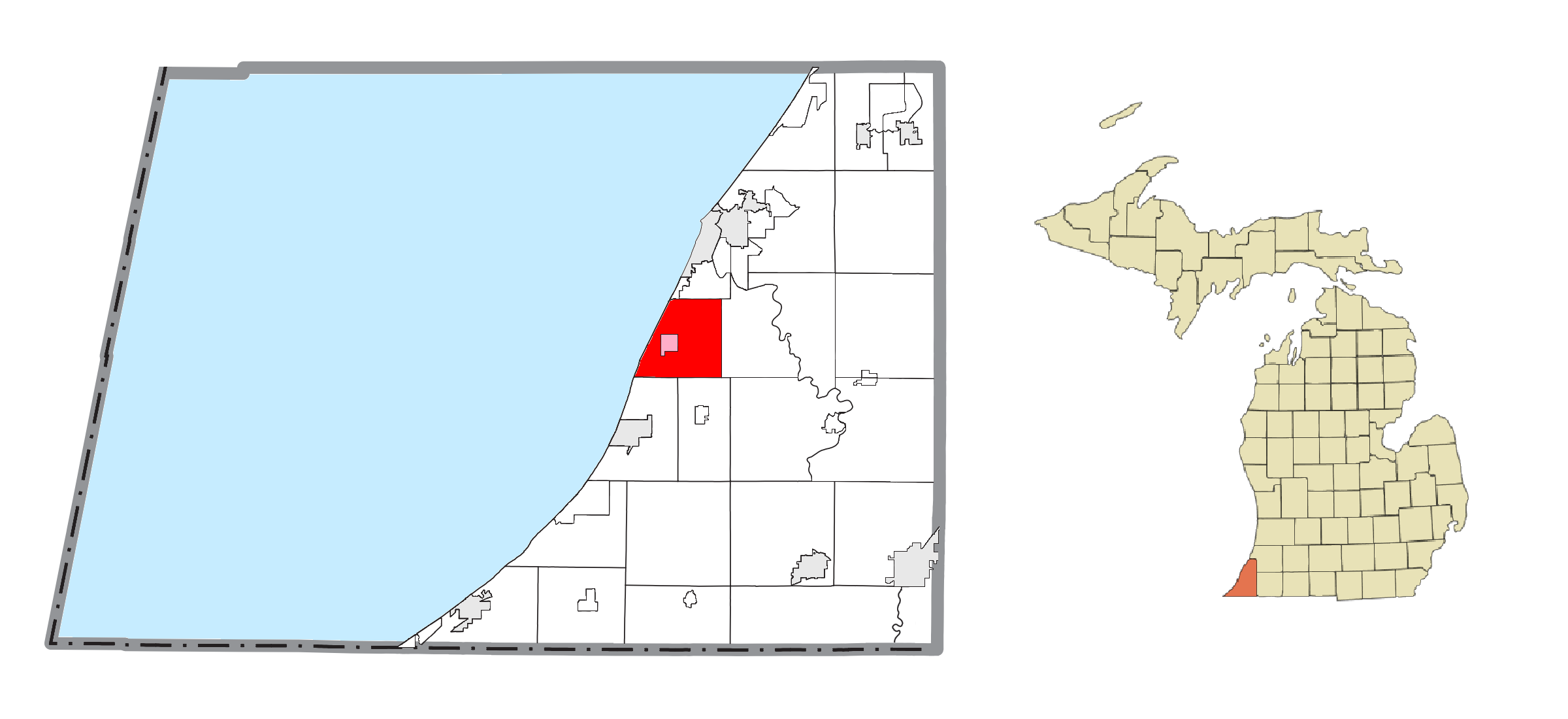
- Location within Berrien County (red) and the administered village of Stevensville (pink)

- Location within the state of Michigan
- Coordinates: 42°01′27″N 86°30′21″W
- Country: United States
- State: Michigan
- County: Berrien

Area
  - Total: 18.2 sq mi (47.2 km^{2})
  - Land: 17.9 sq mi (46.4 km^{2})
  - Water: 0.31 sq mi (0.8 km^{2})
- Elevation: 636 ft (194 m)

Population (2020)
  - Total: 14,929
- Time zone: UTC-5 (Eastern (EST))
  - Summer (DST): UTC-4 (EDT)
- ZIP code(s): 49085, 49101, 49127
- Area code: 269
- FIPS code: 26-47600
- GNIS feature ID: 1626619
- Website: Official website

Lincoln Charter Township is a charter township of Berrien County in the U.S. state of Michigan. The population was 14,929 at the 2020 census.

Lincoln Charter Township is located in the west-central portion of Berrien County, with Lake Michigan to the west. The village of Shoreham and St. Joseph Charter Township are to the north, Royalton Township to the east, Baroda Township to the southeast and south, and Lake Charter Township to the south and southwest.

== Communities ==
- Glenlord was initially called Lincoln in the 1870s. It was named after Monroe N. Lord who donated land for the railroad right-of-way. It had a post office from 1879 until 1905.
- The village of Stevensville is located within the township.

== Geography ==
According to the United States Census Bureau, the township has a total area of 47.2 square miles (122 km^{2}), of which 46.4 square miles (120 km^{2}) is land and 0.8 square miles (2.1 km^{2}), or 1.67%, is water.

Interstate 94 passes through the western portion of the township. Grand Mere State Park is centered on the three Grand Mere Lakes and is home to sand dunes that range from 3,000 to 10,000 years old. The park lies between Stevensville and Lake Michigan.

== Demographics ==
Historical population
Census	Pop.	Note	%±
2000	13,952		—
2010	14,691		5.3%
2020	14,929		1.6%

As of the census of 2000, there were 13,952 people, 5,486 households, and 3,999 families residing in the township. The population density was 778.2 inhabitants per square mile (300.5/km^{2}). There were 5,992 housing units at an average density of 334.2 per square mile (129.0/km^{2}). The racial makeup of the township was 95.62% White, 1.06% African American, 0.32% Native American, 1.39% Asian, 0.02% Pacific Islander, 0.59% from other races, and 1.00% from two or more races. Hispanic or Latino of any race were 1.30% of the population.

There were 5,486 households, out of which 34.2% had children under the age of 18 living with them, 62.8% were married couples living together, 7.7% had a female householder with no husband present, and 27.1% were non-families. 24.0% of all households were made up of individuals, and 9.6% had someone living alone who was 65 years of age or older. The average household size was 2.52 and the average family size was 3.00.

In the township the population was spread out, with 26.1% under the age of 18, 5.9% from 18 to 24, 28.2% from 25 to 44, 26.7% from 45 to 64, and 13.2% who were 65 years of age or older. The median age was 39 years. For every 100 females, there were 95.0 males. For every 100 females age 18 and over, there were 91.5 males.

The median income for a household in the township was $53,718, and the median income for a family was $64,211. Males had a median income of $48,571 versus $26,984 for females. The per capita income for the township was $27,559. About 1.3% of families and 2.7% of the population were below the poverty line, including 1.9% of those under age 18 and 5.0% of those age 65 or over.
