= Stevensville, Michigan =

- Village
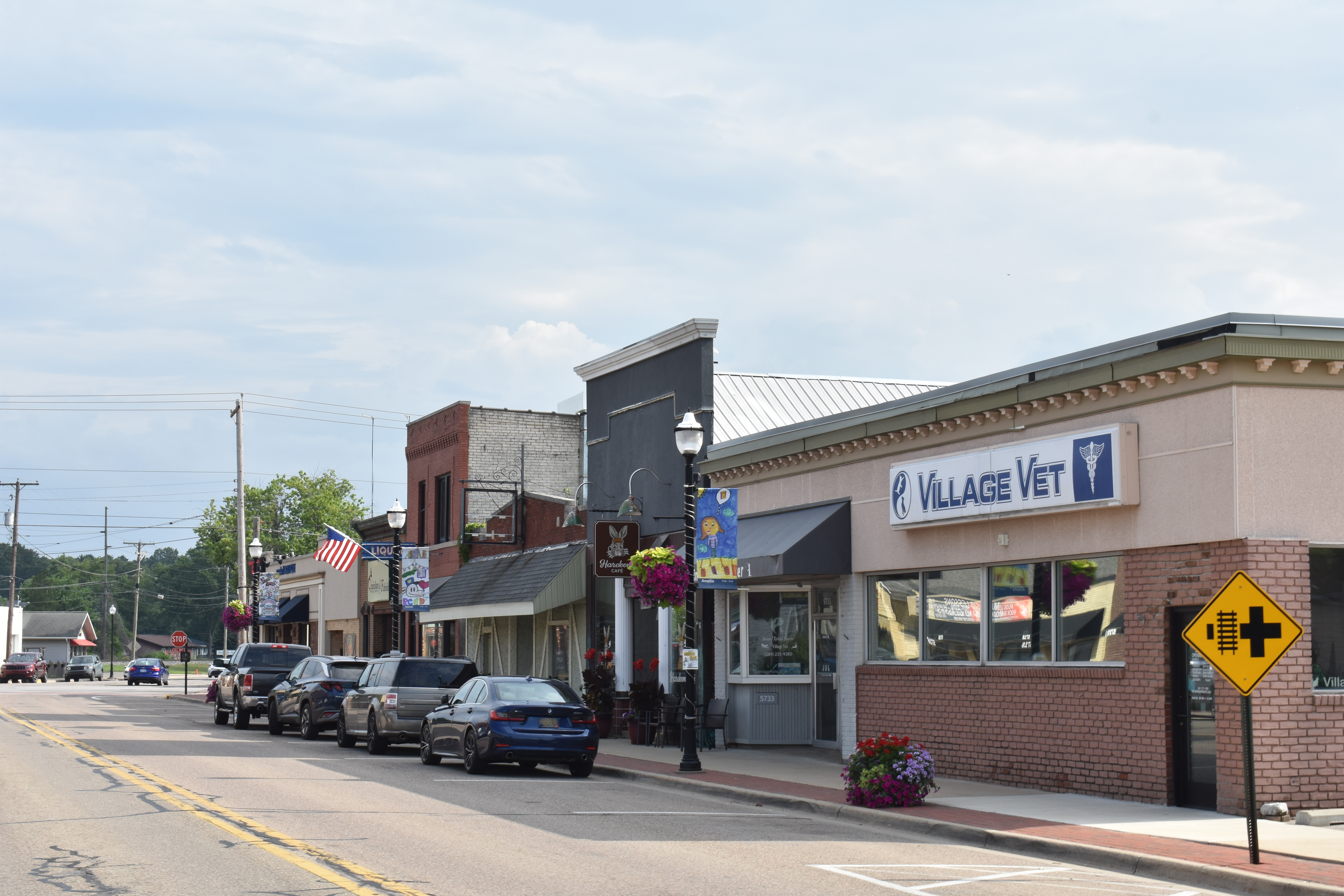
- Stevensville in July 2026

- logo

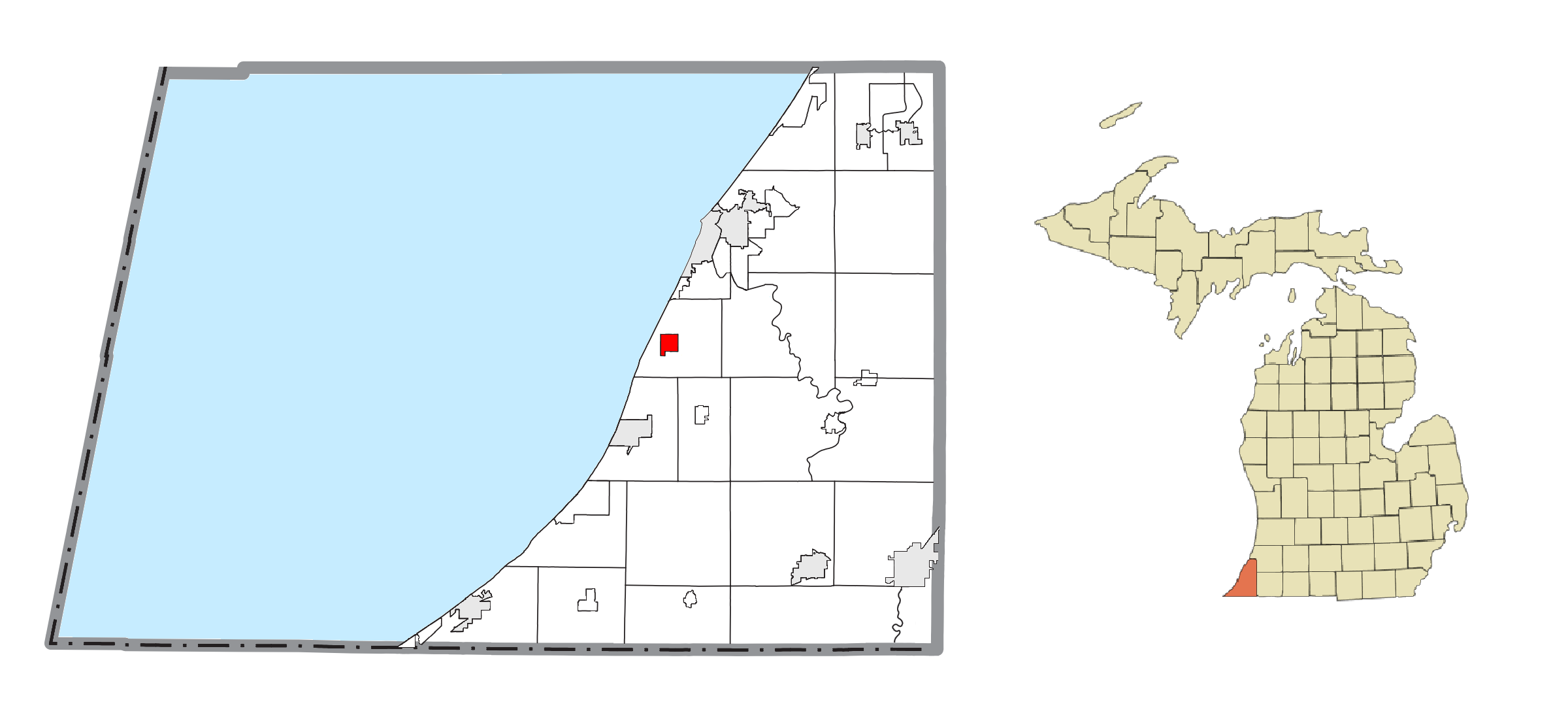
- Location within Berrien County

- Location within the state of Michigan
- Coordinates: 42°00′50″N 86°31′22″W
- Country: United States
- State: Michigan
- County: Berrien
- Township: Lincoln

Government
  - President: Steve Slavicek

Area
  - Total: 1.05 sq mi (2.71 km^{2})
  - Land: 1.04 sq mi (2.70 km^{2})
  - Water: 0.0039 sq mi (0.01 km^{2})
- Elevation: 636 ft (194 m)

Population (2020)
  - Total: 1,147
  - Density: 1,099.1/sq mi (424.36/km^{2})
- Time zone: UTC-5 (Eastern (EST))
  - Summer (DST): UTC-4 (EDT)
- ZIP code(s): 49127
- Area code: 269
- FIPS code: 26-76500
- GNIS feature ID: 0638824
- Website: Official website

Stevensville is a village in Berrien County in the U.S. state of Michigan. The village lies within Lincoln Township. The population was 1,147 at the 2020 census.

== History ==
The village was platted in the 1840s by Thomas Stevens, who was a prominent banker from Niles, Michigan, and owned a large tract of land in the area. A.D. Brown made a later addition, and in 1893 the village was incorporated. In 1906, Stevensville's population was 250.

== Geography ==
According to the United States Census Bureau, the village has a total area of 1.04 square miles (2.69 km^{2}), all land.

== Demographics ==
Historical population
Census	Pop.	Note	%±
1900	251		—
1910	243		−3.2%
1920	206		−15.2%
1930	271		31.6%
1940	382		41.0%
1950	480		25.7%
1960	697		45.2%
1970	1,107		58.8%
1980	1,268		14.5%
1990	1,230		−3.0%
2000	1,191		−3.2%
2010	1,142		−4.1%
2020	1,147		0.4%
U.S. Decennial Census

=== 2010 census ===
As of the census of 2010, there were 1,142 people, 526 households, and 315 families living in the village. The population density was 1,098.1 inhabitants per square mile (424.0/km^{2}). There were 584 housing units at an average density of 561.5 per square mile (216.8/km^{2}). The racial makeup of the village was 94.6% White, 2.1% African American, 1.0% Native American, 1.2% Asian, 0.1% Pacific Islander, 0.6% from other races, and 0.4% from two or more races. Hispanic or Latino of any race were 2.4% of the population.

There were 526 households, of which 23.2% had children under the age of 18 living with them, 47.9% were married couples living together, 9.3% had a female householder with no husband present, 2.7% had a male householder with no wife present, and 40.1% were non-families. 34.4% of all households were made up of individuals, and 14.2% had someone living alone who was 65 years of age or older. The average household size was 2.17 and the average family size was 2.78.

The median age in the village was 44.2 years. 19.4% of residents were under the age of 18; 6.7% were between the ages of 18 and 24; 25.3% were from 25 to 44; 27.9% were from 45 to 64; and 20.5% were 65 years of age or older. The gender makeup of the village was 48.1% male and 51.9% female.

=== 2000 census ===
As of the census of 2000, there were 1,191 people, 522 households, and 326 families living in the village. The population density was 1,153.9 inhabitants per square mile (445.5/km^{2}). There were 575 housing units at an average density of 557.1 per square mile (215.1/km^{2}). The racial makeup of the village was 96.22% White, 1.26% African American, 0.25% Native American, 0.76% Asian, 0.34% from other races, and 1.18% from two or more races. Hispanic or Latino of any race were 0.76% of the population (also including Paco).

There were 522 households, out of which 27.0% had children under the age of 18 living with them, 52.1% were married couples living together, 8.4% had a female householder with no husband present, and 37.4% were non-families. 31.4% of all households were made up of individuals, and 13.4% had someone living alone who was 65 years of age or older. The average household size was 2.27 and the average family size was 2.87.

In the village, the population was spread out, with 22.6% under the age of 18, 5.8% from 18 to 24, 29.8% from 25 to 44, 23.2% from 45 to 64, and 18.6% who were 65 years of age or older. The median age was 40 years. For every 100 females, there were 88.7 males. For every 100 females age 18 and over, there were 86.6 males.

The median income for a household in the village was $42,569, and the median income for a family was $54,000. Males had a median income of $37,125 versus $29,125 for females. The per capita income for the village was $23,228. About 0.6% of families and 1.5% of the population were below the poverty line, including 2.8% of those under age 18 and 1.0% of those age 65 or over.

== Education ==
Stevensville and neighboring Baroda are served by Lakeshore Public Schools.

Christ Lutheran School is a Pre-K-8 school of the Lutheran Church Missouri Synod in Stevensville.

St. Paul's Lutheran School is a Pre-K-8 school of the Wisconsin Evangelical Lutheran Synod in Stevensville.
