= Lake Charter Township, Michigan =

- Charter township
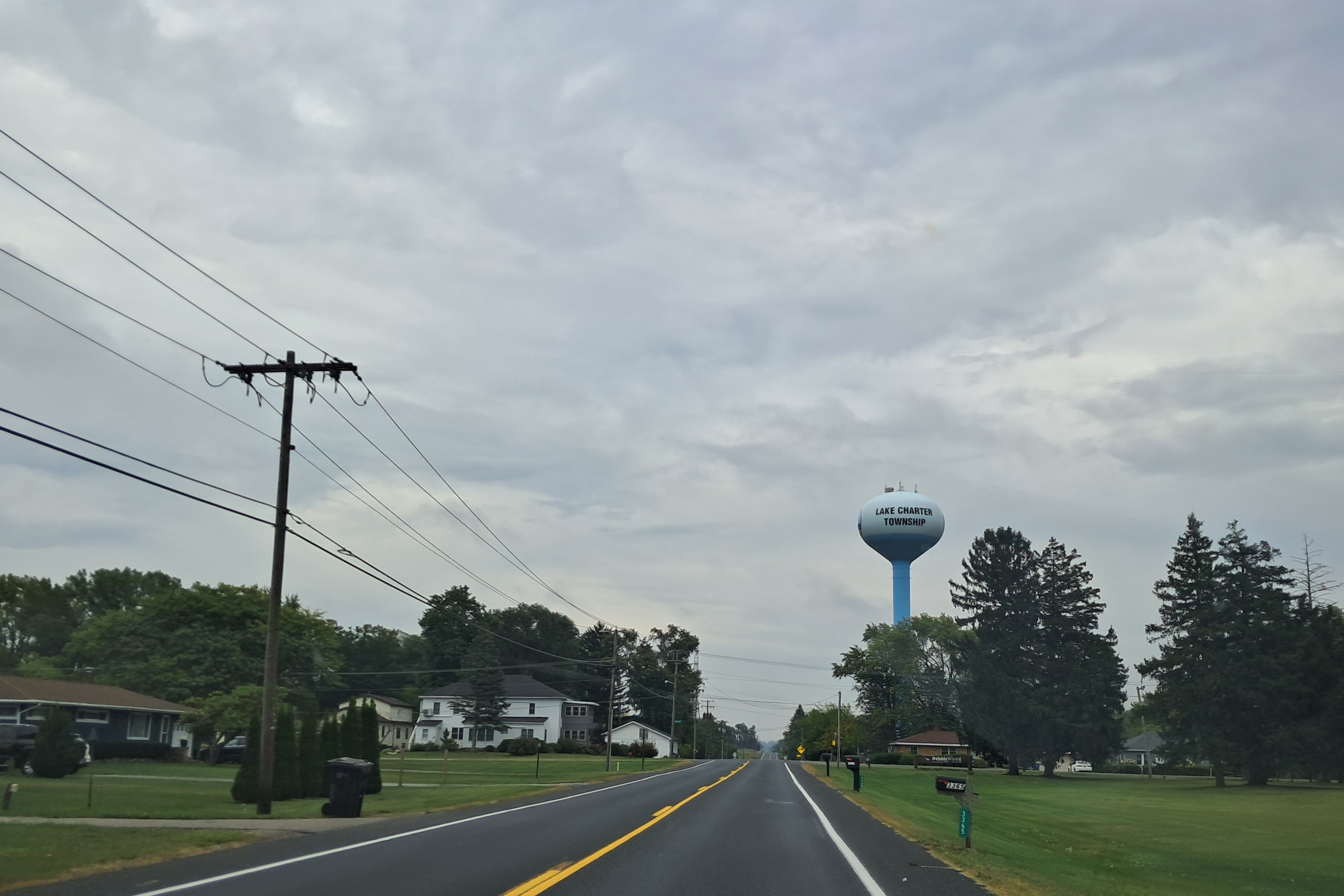
- Water tower at Shawnee Road

- Seal

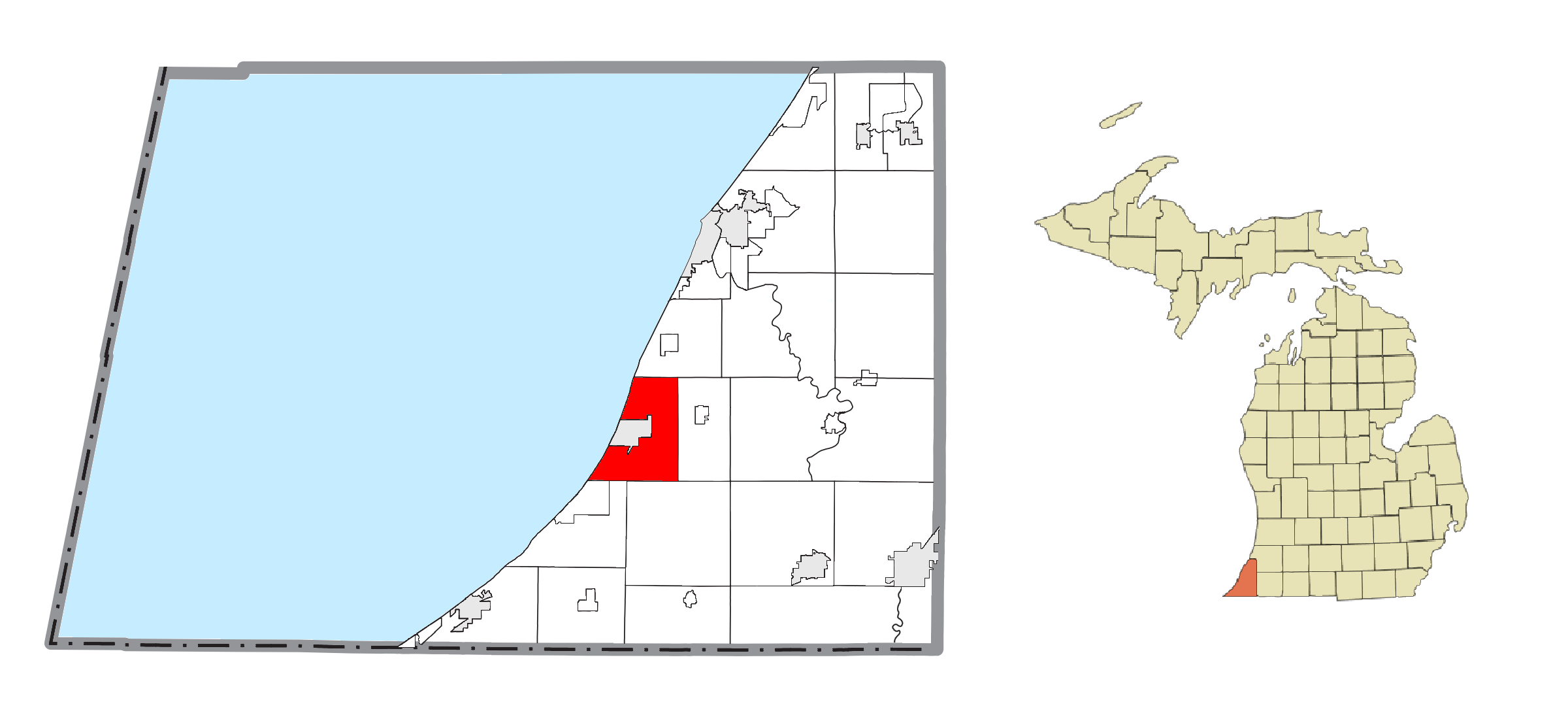
- Location within Berrien County

- Location within the state of Michigan
- Coordinates: 41°56′16″N 86°32′37″W
- Country: United States
- State: Michigan
- County: Berrien

Area
  - Total: 18.6 sq mi (48.3 km^{2})
  - Land: 18.6 sq mi (48.2 km^{2})
  - Water: 0.039 sq mi (0.1 km^{2})
- Elevation: 709 ft (216 m)

Population (2020)
  - Total: 3,316
- Time zone: UTC-5 (Eastern (EST))
  - Summer (DST): UTC-4 (EDT)
- ZIP code(s): 49101, 49106, 49125, 49127
- Area code: 269
- FIPS code: 26-44260
- GNIS feature ID: 1626580
- Website: Official website

Lake Charter Township is a charter township of Berrien County in the U.S. state of Michigan. The population was 3,316 at the 2020 census. The township is located in the west central portion of the county. Lake Michigan and the city of Bridgman are to the west, Lincoln Township to the north, Baroda Township to the east, Weesaw Township to the south, and Chikaming Township to the southwest. The township is most known as the home of the Donald C. Cook Nuclear Plant.

== Communities ==
- Browntown was a village in Lake Township that was platted in 1861 where what is today Browntown Road crossed the Pere Marquette Railway. It no longer exists.
- Livingston is a small unincorporated community in the township at the junction of Livington and Gast roads, just east of I-94 and Red Arrow Highway at 41°58′06″N 86°32′35″W in section 8 in the northern part of the township. A post office was established in August 1890 and operated until July 1912.

In 1848, a village of 80 blocks was platted in section 25 with the name Livingston, but nothing became of it and it soon became farm property. (Note: Romig states that "in 1837, a village of 80 blocks was platted in Lake Township, 12 miles north of St. Joseph, on Lake Michigan, but nothing further was done to develop it, and it reverted to farmland." However, this is clearly mistaken in some respect, because Lake township is south of St. Joseph. Aside from the year, the other details accord with the failed village in section 25 of Lake Township.)

== Geography ==
According to the United States Census Bureau, the township has a total area of 18.6 square miles (48.3 km^{2}), of which 18.6 square miles (48.2 km^{2}) is land and 0.04 square miles (0.1 km^{2}), or 0.20%, is water.

I-94 passes through the township, parallel to the Lake Michigan shore. Warren Dunes State Park is in the southwest of the township.

=== Flooding ===
Lake Charter Township derived its name from the existence of a high water table. The community was built on top of an ancient lake named "Lake Baroda".

Due to the soil composition and failure of state and local governments to maintain infrastructure to manage storm water, the area is prone to flooding. There has been significant flooding in 2018, 2020, 2021 and 2023. In some of these cases, homeowners have been displaced for several weeks or months due to the extent of damage. Although homeowners have experienced significant losses due to flooding, the area is not recognized as an official FEMA flood zone. Berrien County has not requested a declaration of a state of emergency in any of these instances so residents are unable to recoup of the costs for damages.

== Demographics ==
Historical population
Census	Pop.	Note	%±
2000	3,148		—
2010	2,972		−5.6%
2020	3,316		11.6%

As of the census of 2000, there were 3,148 people, 1,171 households, and 892 families residing in the township. The population density was 168.4 inhabitants per square mile (65.0/km^{2}). There were 1,366 housing units at an average density of 73.1 per square mile (28.2/km^{2}). The racial makeup of the township was 97.74% White, 0.67% African American, 0.29% Native American, 0.25% Asian, 0.03% Pacific Islander, 0.19% from other races, and 0.83% from two or more races. Hispanic or Latino of any race were 0.92% of the population.

There were 1,171 households, out of which 34.8% had children under the age of 18 living with them, 65.2% were married couples living together, 8.2% had a female householder with no husband present, and 23.8% were non-families. 21.0% of all households were made up of individuals, and 8.1% had someone living alone who was 65 years of age or older. The average household size was 2.61 and the average family size was 3.02.

In the township the population was spread out, with 24.8% under the age of 18, 6.1% from 18 to 24, 28.9% from 25 to 44, 25.4% from 45 to 64, and 14.8% who were 65 years of age or older. The median age was 40 years. For every 100 females, there were 95.4 males. For every 100 females age 18 and over, there were 95.3 males.

The median income for a household in the township was $49,764, and the median income for a family was $57,228. Males had a median income of $41,673 versus $26,531 for females. The per capita income for the township was $21,666. About 6.4% of families and 8.7% of the population were below the poverty line, including 10.8% of those under age 18 and 13.3% of those age 65 or over.
