= Bridgman High School =

High school in Michigan, United States

Coordinates: 41.9392°N 86.5451°W

Location
- 9964 Gast Road; Bridgman, (Berrien County), Michigan 49106; United States

Information
- Type: Public high school
- School district: Bridgman Public Schools
- Principal: Gerald Heath
- Staff: 21.12 (FTE)
- Enrollment: 245 (2023-2024)
- Student to teacher ratio: 11.60
- Colors: Orange and navy
- Athletics conference: Southwestern Athletic Conference
- Nickname: Bees
- Website: https://www.bridgmanschools.com/schools/bridgman-high-school/home

Student assessments
- 2021–22 school year Change vs. prior year

M-STEP 11th grade proficiency rates (Science / Social Studies)
- Advanced %: 32.3 / 32.3
- Proficient %: 27.4 / 37.1
- PR. Proficient %: 12.9 / 24.2
- Not Proficient %: 27.4 / 6.5

Average test scores
- SAT Total: 1079.8 (▼ −6.8)

Bridgman High School is a public high school located in Bridgman, Michigan. It is part of the Bridgman Public Schools district.
