= Baroda, Michigan =

- Village
- Seal

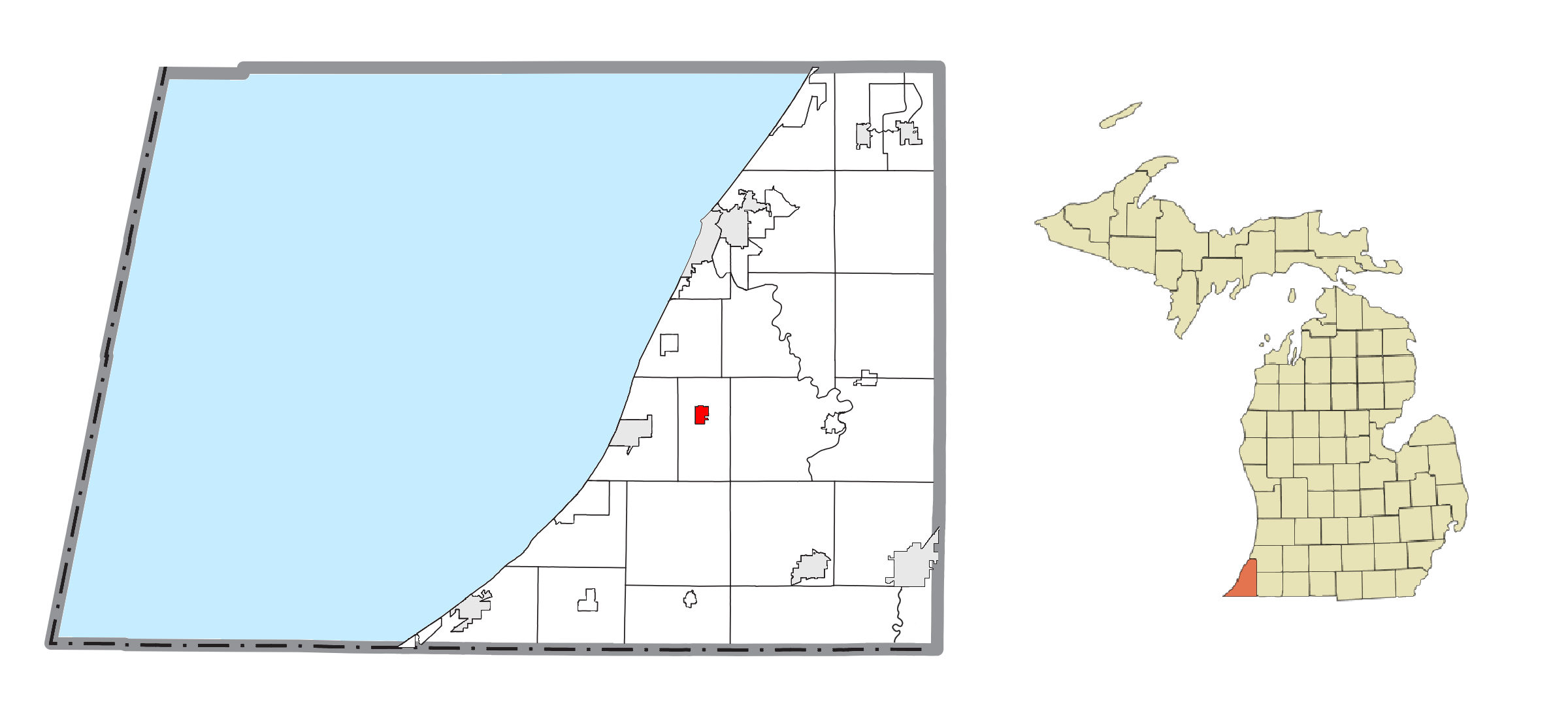
- Location within Berrien County

- Location within the state of Michigan
- Coordinates: 41°57′17″N 86°29′17″W
- Country: United States
- State: Michigan
- County: Berrien
- Township: Baroda
- Incorporated: 1907 (village)

Government
  - Type: Village council
  - President: Michael Price

Area
  - Total: 0.72 sq mi (1.86 km^{2})
  - Land: 0.72 sq mi (1.86 km^{2})
  - Water: 0 sq mi (0.00 km^{2})
- Elevation: 643 ft (196 m)

Population (2020)
  - Total: 875
  - Density: 1,220.8/sq mi (471.37/km^{2})
- Time zone: UTC-5 (Eastern (EST))
  - Summer (DST): UTC-4 (EDT)
- ZIP code(s): 49101
- Area code: 269
- FIPS code: 26-05500
- GNIS feature ID: 2398036
- Website: Official website

Baroda is a village in Berrien County in the U.S. state of Michigan. The population was 875 at the 2020 census. The village is within Baroda Township.

== History ==
The first European American settlers started to arrive in the 1830s and began clearing the land, draining the swamps, and building homes and farms. Michael Houser is considered the founder of Baroda, bargaining with the Indiana and Lake Michigan Railway Company to establish a station on his land. Houser platted the village ca. 1890. Houser named the community after Baroda in Gujarat, India. The village incorporated in 1907. The Baroda Post Office opened on January 1, 1891. A proposal to disincorporate failed in 2026.

== Geography ==
According to the United States Census Bureau, the village has a total area of 0.72 square miles (1.86 km^{2}), all land.

== Demographics ==
Historical population
Census	Pop.	Note	%±
1910	248		—
1920	223		−10.1%
1930	291		30.5%
1940	302		3.8%
1950	344		13.9%
1960	488		41.9%
1970	504		3.3%
1980	627		24.4%
1990	657		4.8%
2000	858		30.6%
2010	873		1.7%
2020	875		0.2%
U.S. Decennial Census

=== 2010 census ===
As of the census of 2010, there were 873 people, 381 households, and 229 families residing in the village. The population density was 1,212.5 inhabitants per square mile (468.1/km^{2}). There were 407 housing units at an average density of 565.3 per square mile (218.3/km^{2}). The racial makeup of the village was 95.6% White, 0.5% African American, 0.5% Native American, 0.1% Asian, 0.1% Pacific Islander, 1.1% from other races, and 2.1% from two or more races. Hispanic or Latino of any race were 2.5% of the population.

There were 381 households, of which 30.4% had children under the age of 18 living with them, 43.6% were married couples living together, 13.6% had a female householder with no husband present, 2.9% had a male householder with no wife present, and 39.9% were non-families. 33.1% of all households were made up of individuals, and 11.5% had someone living alone who was 65 years of age or older. The average household size was 2.29 and the average family size was 2.90.

The median age in the village was 37.8 years. 24.1% of residents were under the age of 18; 8.4% were between the ages of 18 and 24; 26.8% were from 25 to 44; 26.7% were from 45 to 64; and 14% were 65 years of age or older. The gender makeup of the village was 48.8% male and 51.2% female.

=== 2000 census ===
As of the census of 2000, there were 858 people, 362 households, and 232 families residing in the village. The population density was 1,343.2 inhabitants per square mile (518.6/km^{2}). There were 378 housing units at an average density of 591.8 per square mile (228.5/km^{2}). The racial makeup of the village was 96.74% White, 0.47% African American, 0.35% Native American, 0.58% Asian, 0.35% from other races, and 1.52% from two or more races. Hispanic or Latino of any race were 0.93% of the population.

There were 362 households, out of which 33.7% had children under the age of 18 living with them, 51.7% were married couples living together, 9.1% had a female householder with no husband present, and 35.9% were non-families. 29.6% of all households were made up of individuals, and 10.2% had someone living alone who was 65 years of age or older. The average household size was 2.35 and the average family size was 2.92.

In the village, the population was spread out, with 25.3% under the age of 18, 5.7% from 18 to 24, 34.6% from 25 to 44, 19.1% from 45 to 64, and 15.3% who were 65 years of age or older. The median age was 36 years. For every 100 females, there were 98.6 males. For every 100 females age 18 and over, there were 94.8 males.

The median income for a household in the village was $36,250, and the median income for a family was $41,979. Males had a median income of $32,411 versus $24,107 for females. The per capita income for the village was $16,412. About 6.0% of families and 7.9% of the population were below the poverty line, including 8.1% of those under age 18 and 10.7% of those age 65 or over.
