= Bridgman, Michigan =

- City
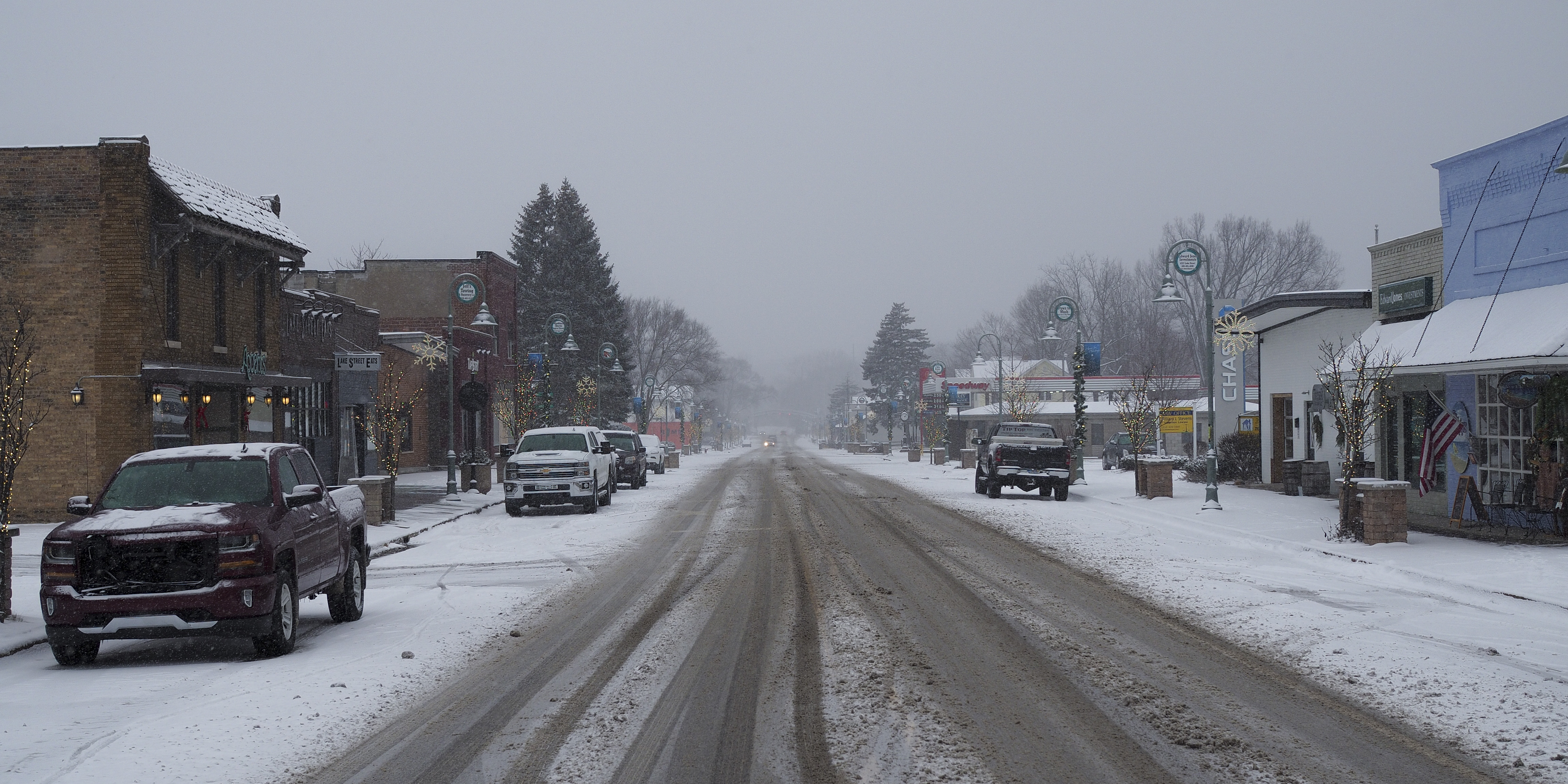
- Downtown Bridgman along Lake Street

- Seal

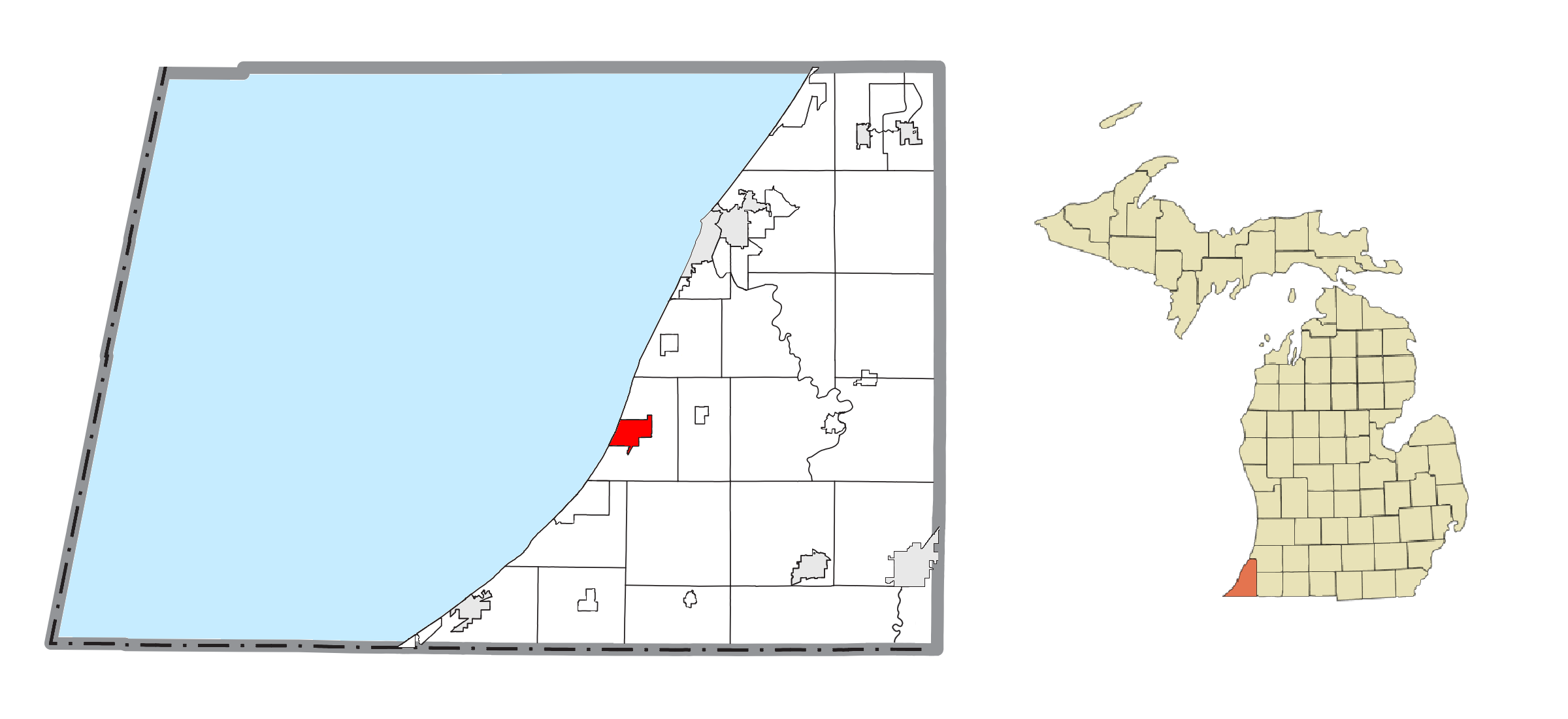
- Location within Berrien County

- Location within the state of Michigan
- Coordinates: 41°56′30″N 86°33′35″W
- Country: United States
- State: Michigan
- County: Berrien

Government
  - Type: City council
  - Mayor: Vince Rose

Area
  - Total: 2.92 sq mi (7.57 km^{2})
  - Land: 2.89 sq mi (7.49 km^{2})
  - Water: 0.031 sq mi (0.08 km^{2})
- Elevation: 679 ft (207 m)

Population (2020)
  - Total: 2,096
  - Density: 724.6/sq mi (279.76/km^{2})
- Time zone: UTC-5 (Eastern (EST))
  - Summer (DST): UTC-4 (EDT)
- ZIP code(s): 49106
- Area code: 269
- FIPS code: 26-10580
- GNIS feature ID: 0621967
- Website: www.bridgman.org

Bridgman is a city in Berrien County in the U.S. state of Michigan. The population was 2,096 at the time of the 2020 census.

== History ==
There was a place in this area known as Plummer's Pier. In 1856 lumbermen founded Charlotteville in this area.

Bridgman itself begins with the village of that name platted by George C. Bridgman in 1870. It was centered on a railroad station opened that year.

The Bridgman post office, with ZIP code 49106 opened with the name "Laketon" on November 11, 1862. The name changed to Bridgman on April 9, 1874. Bridgman later expanded by annexing the area that had previously been Charlotteville. The town is famous for being the location of the 1922 Bridgman Convention, a clandestine communist planning meeting in 1922 that was broken up by Federal Bureau of Investigation agents and local authorities.

== Geography ==
According to the United States Census Bureau, the city has a total area of 2.93 square miles (7.59 km^{2}), of which 2.90 square miles (7.51 km^{2}) is land and 0.03 square miles (0.08 km^{2}) is water.

== Demographics ==
Historical population
Census	Pop.	Note	%±
1880	194		—
1930	848		—
1940	774		−8.7%
1950	977		26.2%
1960	1,454		48.8%
1970	1,621		11.5%
1980	2,235		37.9%
1990	2,140		−4.3%
2000	2,428		13.5%
2010	2,291		−5.6%
2020	2,096		−8.5%
U.S. Decennial Census

=== 2020 census ===
As of the 2020 census, Bridgman had a population of 2,096. The median age was 48.3 years. 20.1% of residents were under the age of 18 and 25.0% of residents were 65 years of age or older. For every 100 females there were 97.0 males, and for every 100 females age 18 and over there were 93.2 males age 18 and over.

97.9% of residents lived in urban areas, while 2.1% lived in rural areas.

There were 935 households in Bridgman, of which 23.3% had children under the age of 18 living in them. Of all households, 44.3% were married-couple households, 20.0% were households with a male householder and no spouse or partner present, and 30.7% were households with a female householder and no spouse or partner present. About 36.4% of all households were made up of individuals and 17.0% had someone living alone who was 65 years of age or older.

There were 1,172 housing units, of which 20.2% were vacant. The homeowner vacancy rate was 2.0% and the rental vacancy rate was 11.6%.

Racial composition as of the 2020 census
Race	Number	Percent
White	1,902	90.7%
Black or African American	24	1.1%
American Indian and Alaska Native	4	0.2%
Asian	44	2.1%
Native Hawaiian and Other Pacific Islander	2	0.1%
Some other race	14	0.7%
Two or more races	106	5.1%
Hispanic or Latino (of any race)	54	2.6%

=== 2010 census ===
As of the census of 2010, there were 2,291 people, 954 households, and 608 families living in the city. The population density was 790.0 inhabitants per square mile (305.0/km^{2}). There were 1,183 housing units at an average density of 407.9 per square mile (157.5/km^{2}). The racial makeup of the city was 95.3% White, 1.1% African American, 0.6% Native American, 1.0% Asian, 0.7% from other races, and 1.2% from two or more races. Hispanic or Latino of any race were 3.7% of the population.

There were 954 households, of which 28.1% had children under the age of 18 living with them, 49.9% were married couples living together, 10.3% had a female householder with no husband present, 3.6% had a male householder with no wife present, and 36.3% were non-families. 32.3% of all households were made up of individuals, and 13.7% had someone living alone who was 65 years of age or older. The average household size was 2.30 and the average family size was 2.88.

The median age in the city was 44.3 years. 22.1% of residents were under the age of 18; 6.1% were between the ages of 18 and 24; 22.6% were from 25 to 44; 28.6% were from 45 to 64; and 20.5% were 65 years of age or older. The gender makeup of the city was 47.5% male and 52.5% female.

=== 2000 census ===
As of the census of 2000, there were 2,428 people, 998 households, and 649 families living in the city. The population density was 829.4 inhabitants per square mile (320.2/km^{2}). There were 1,140 housing units at an average density of 389.4 per square mile (150.3/km^{2}). The racial makeup of the city was 96.33% White, 0.70% African American, 0.37% Native American, 0.45% Asian, 0.04% Pacific Islander, 0.95% from other races, and 1.15% from two or more races. Hispanic or Latino of any race were 1.81% of the population.

There were 998 households, out of which 30.0% had children under the age of 18 living with them, 53.8% were married couples living together, 8.9% had a female householder with no husband present, and 34.9% were non-families. 31.9% of all households were made up of individuals, and 10.9% had someone living alone who was 65 years of age or older. The average household size was 2.31 and the average family size was 2.92.

In the city, the population was spread out, with 23.1% under the age of 18, 6.1% from 18 to 24, 26.9% from 25 to 44, 25.3% from 45 to 64, and 18.6% who were 65 years of age or older. The median age was 41 years. For every 100 females, there were 93.9 males. For every 100 females age 18 and over, there were 88.4 males.

The median income for a household in the city was $48,292, and the median income for a family was $56,466. Males had a median income of $40,862 versus $24,297 for females. The per capita income for the city was $25,405. About 4.7% of families and 6.9% of the population were below the poverty line, including 8.3% of those under age 18 and 5.8% of those age 65 or over.

== Parks and recreation ==
Bridgman offers access to a variety of parks and outdoor recreational opportunities, most notably Weko Beach Park, a public beach located on the shores of Lake Michigan. The park features more than 900 feet of beachfront, dune trails, a campground, picnic areas, and a beach house. Weko Beach also hosts seasonal events, including the Weko Beach Concert Series, where live music is performed outdoors at sunset.

Weko Beach is connected by a trail system to Warren Dunes State Park, one of Michigan’s most popular state parks, offering extended hiking, additional beaches, and large sand dunes for climbing and sightseeing.

In addition to lakeside recreation, the city maintains several community parks, including Toth Street Park, which offers a dog park, playground, and a walking path.

== Education and library ==
The community supports the Bridgman Public Schools system which includes an elementary school, a middle school, and Bridgman High School.

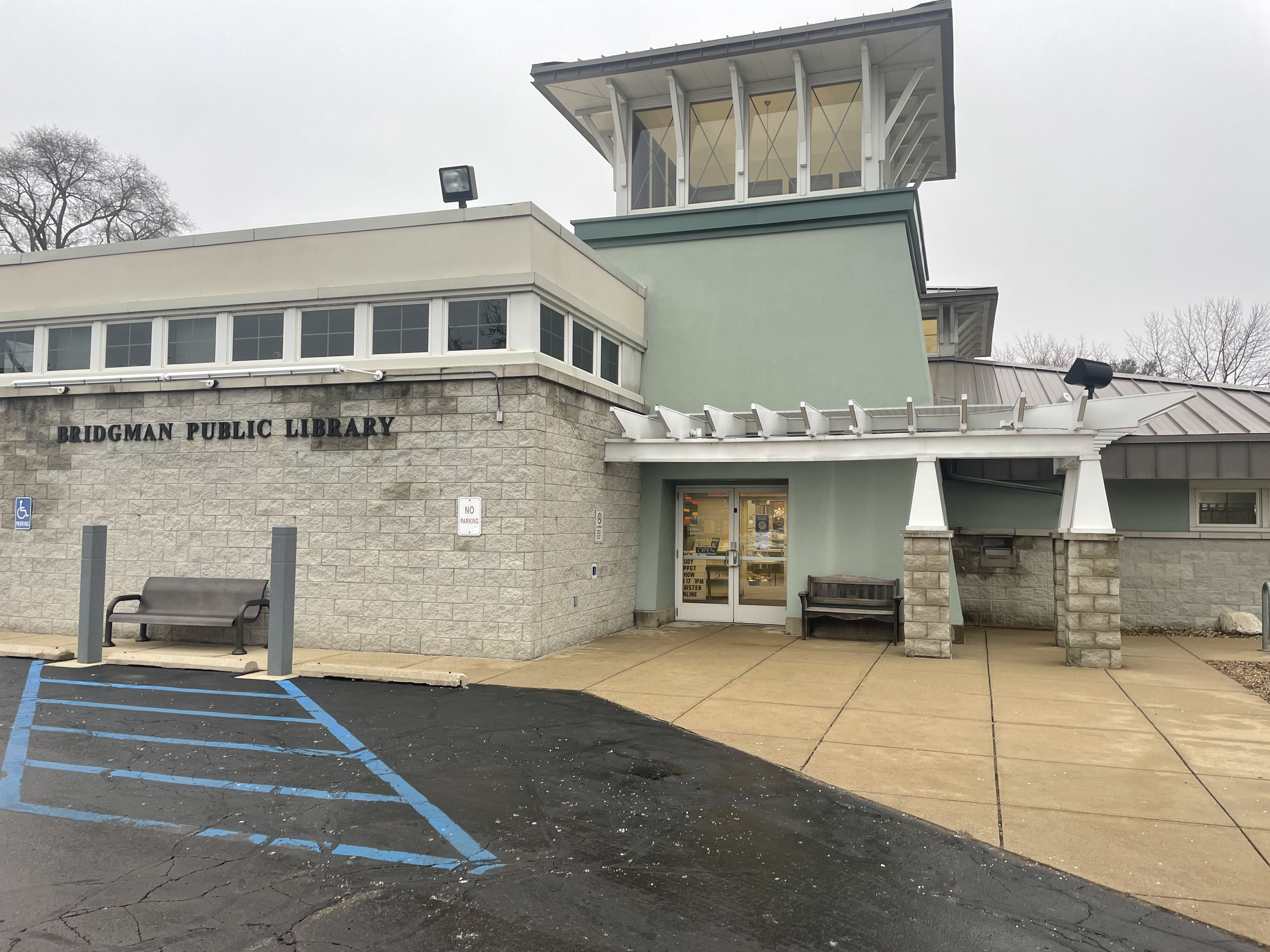
Bridgman Public Library

The Bridgman Public Library was established in 1966. It also serves as the location for the Bridgman/Lake Township Historical Society.

== Notable people ==
- Herbert S. Gutowsky, chemist
- Ralf Mojsiejenko, German-born NFL player
- Jerry Planutis, NFL player; coach for the Michigan State Spartans and Bridgman High School
