= St. Joseph Charter Township, Michigan =

- Charter township
- logo
- Motto: "A Full Service Community"
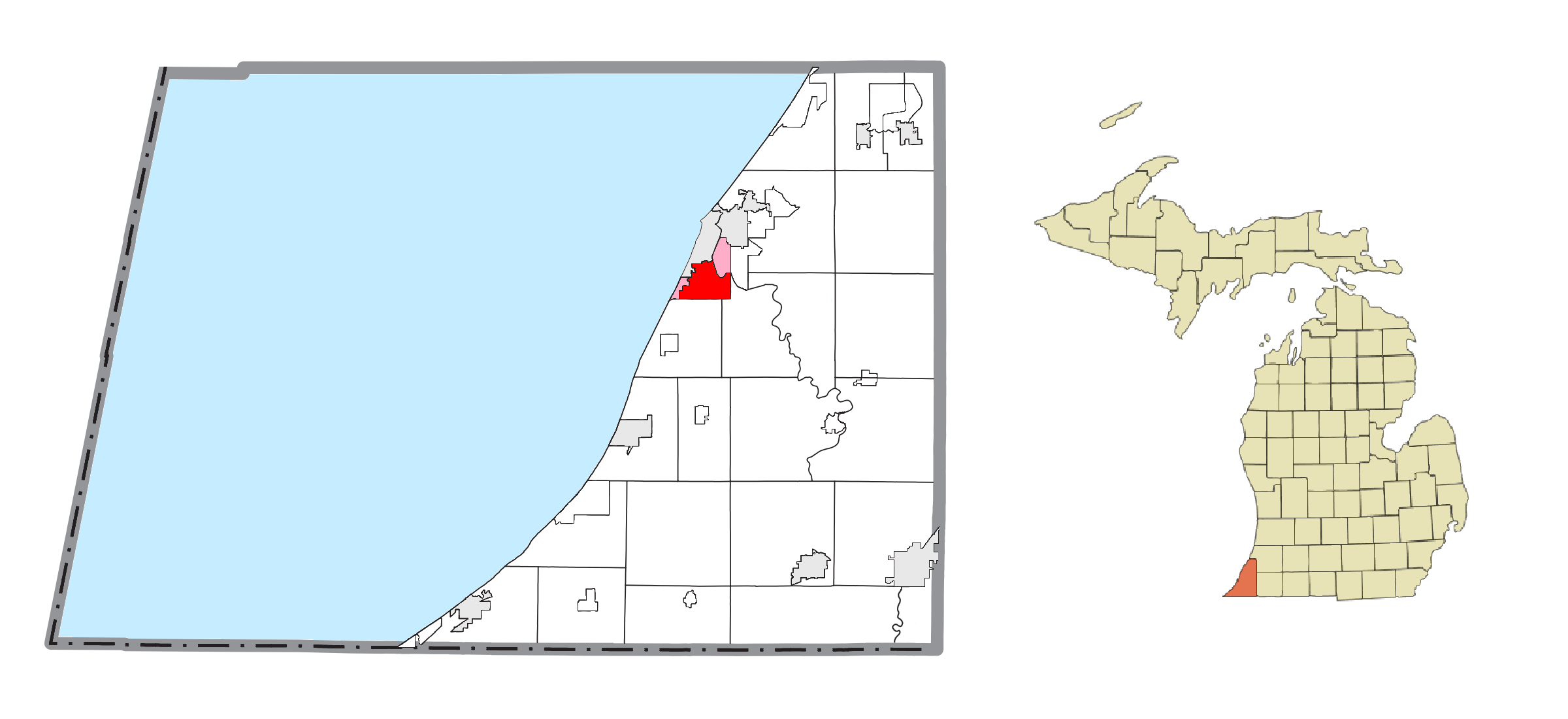
- Location within Berrien County (red) and the administered village of Shoreham and a portion of the Fair Plain community (pink)

- Location within the state of Michigan St. Joseph Township (the United States)
- Coordinates: 42°04′14″N 86°28′42″W
- Country: United States
- State: Michigan
- County: Berrien
- Organized: 1832

Area
  - Total: 6.9 sq mi (18.0 km^{2})
  - Land: 6.6 sq mi (17.2 km^{2})
  - Water: 0.31 sq mi (0.8 km^{2})
- Elevation: 650 ft (198 m)

Population (2020)
  - Total: 9,993
- Time zone: UTC-5 (Eastern (EST))
  - Summer (DST): UTC-4 (EDT)
- ZIP code(s): 49022, 49085
- Area code: 269
- FIPS code: 26-70980
- GNIS feature ID: 1627032
- Website: Official website

St. Joseph Charter Township is a charter township of Berrien County in the U.S. state of Michigan. The population was 9,993 at the 2020 census. The township is on the shores of Lake Michigan in the west central portion of the county, south of and adjacent to the city of St. Joseph.

== Communities ==
The village of Shoreham, on Lake Michigan south of the city of St. Joseph, is the only incorporated community within the boundaries of the township. Both the village and township are bedroom communities for the city of St. Joseph.

Fair Plain is an unincorporated census-designated place that includes the portion of the township lying north of the St. Joseph River.

== History ==
The township was one of the original divisions of Berrien County, and was organized in 1832.

== Geography ==
According to the United States Census Bureau, the township has a total area of 6.9 square miles (18.0 km^{2}), of which 6.6 square miles (17.2 km^{2}) is land and 0.31 square miles (0.8 km^{2}), or 4.56%, is water.

The St. Joseph River flows through the township.

== Demographics ==
As of the census of 2000, there were 10,042 people, 4,094 households, and 2,947 families residing in the township. The population density was 1,507.1 inhabitants per square mile (581.9/km^{2}). There were 4,271 housing units at an average density of 641.0 per square mile (247.5/km^{2}). The racial makeup of the township was 85.21% White, 11.47% African American, 0.32% Native American, 1.72% Asian, 0.03% Pacific Islander, 0.44% from other races, and 0.81% from two or more races. Hispanic or Latino of any race were 1.05% of the population.

There were 4,094 households, out of which 29.1% had children under the age of 18 living with them, 62.5% were married couples living together, 7.2% had a female householder with no husband present, and 28.0% were non-families. 24.7% of all households were made up of individuals, and 12.8% had someone living alone who was 65 years of age or older. The average household size was 2.45 and the average family size was 2.93.

In the township the population was spread out, with 23.9% under the age of 18, 4.7% from 18 to 24, 26.2% from 25 to 44, 27.0% from 45 to 64, and 18.3% who were 65 years of age or older. The median age was 42 years. For every 100 females, there were 95.3 males. For every 100 females age 18 and over, there were 90.4 males.

The median income for a household in the township was $54,158, and the median income for a family was $60,743. Males had a median income of $49,410 versus $31,375 for females. The per capita income for the township was $28,095. About 2.2% of families and 3.7% of the population were below the poverty line, including 7.2% of those under age 18 and 2.8% of those age 65 or over.
