= Shoreham, Michigan =

- Village
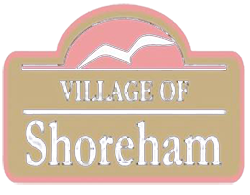
- logo

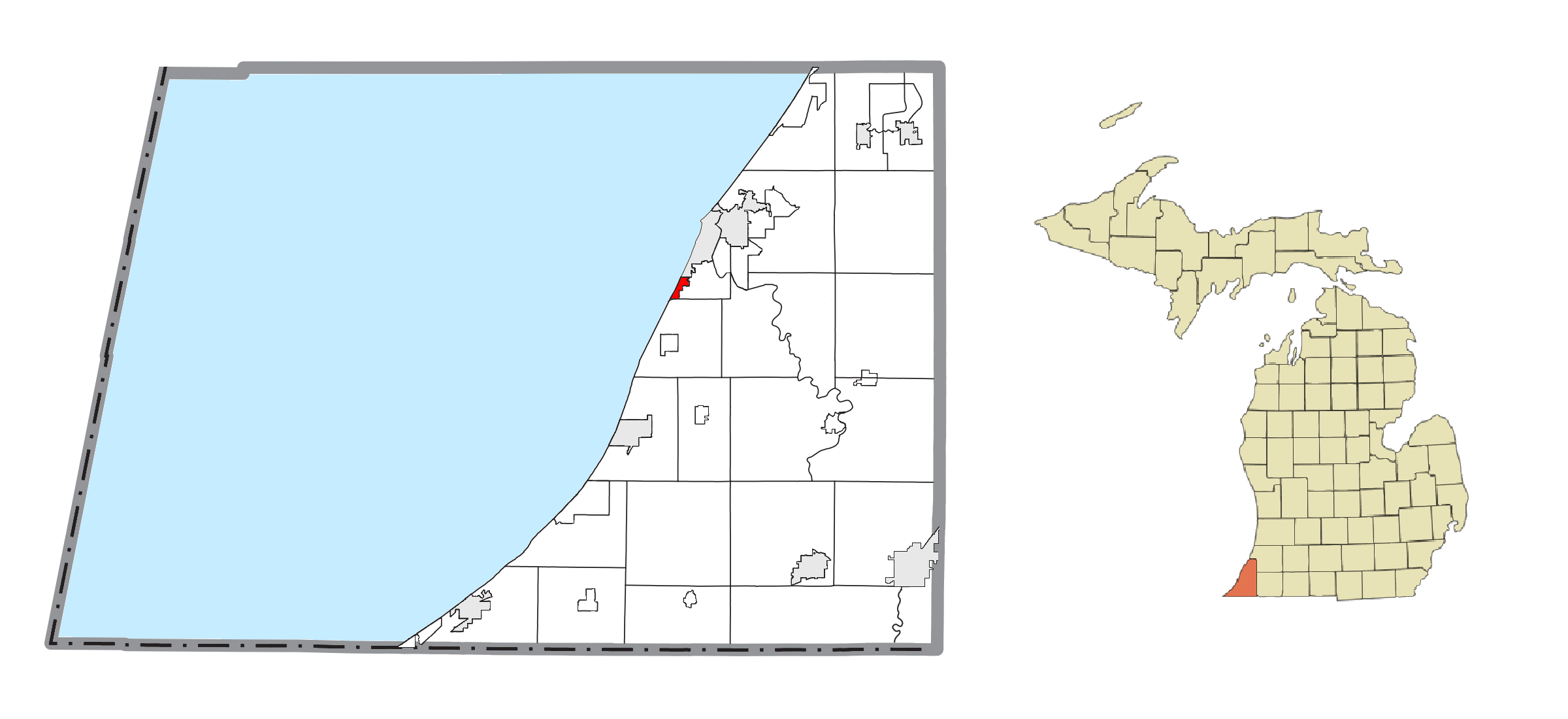
- Location within Berrien County

- Location within the state of Michigan
- Coordinates: 42°03′38″N 86°30′31″W
- Country: United States
- State: Michigan
- County: Berrien
- Township: St. Joseph
- Incorporated: 1920

Area
  - Total: 0.59 sq mi (1.52 km^{2})
  - Land: 0.59 sq mi (1.52 km^{2})
  - Water: 0 sq mi (0.00 km^{2})
- Elevation: 581 ft (177 m)

Population (2020)
  - Total: 844
  - Density: 1,440.8/sq mi (556.29/km^{2})
- Time zone: UTC-5 (Eastern (EST))
  - Summer (DST): UTC-4 (EDT)
- ZIP code(s): 49085
- Area code: 269
- FIPS code: 26-73660
- GNIS feature ID: 0637840
- Website: www.shorehamvillagemi.org

Shoreham is a village in Berrien County, Michigan, United States. The population was 844 at the 2020 census. The village is located within St. Joseph Charter Township on the shore of Lake Michigan, just south of the City of St. Joseph.

== Geography ==
According to the United States Census Bureau, the village has a total area of 0.58 square miles (1.50 km^{2}), all land.

== Demographics ==
Historical population
Census	Pop.	Note	%±
1940	225		—
1950	391		73.8%
1960	443		13.3%
1970	666		50.3%
1980	742		11.4%
1990	737		−0.7%
2000	860		16.7%
2010	862		0.2%
2020	844		−2.1%
U.S. Decennial Census

=== 2010 census ===
As of the census of 2010, there were 862 people, 392 households, and 261 families living in the village. The population density was 1,486.2 inhabitants per square mile (573.8/km^{2}). There were 471 housing units at an average density of 812.1 per square mile (313.6/km^{2}). The racial makeup of the village was 89.6% White, 3.5% African American, 0.1% Native American, 4.9% Asian, 0.2% from other races, and 1.7% from two or more races. Hispanic or Latino of any race were 3.0% of the population.

There were 392 households, of which 23.2% had children under the age of 18 living with them, 58.2% were married couples living together, 5.9% had a female householder with no husband present, 2.6% had a male householder with no wife present, and 33.4% were non-families. 28.1% of all households were made up of individuals, and 13.3% had someone living alone who was 65 years of age or older. The average household size was 2.20 and the average family size was 2.67.

The median age in the village was 48.1 years. 18.2% of residents were under the age of 18; 4.5% were between the ages of 18 and 24; 23.4% were from 25 to 44; 31.3% were from 45 to 64; and 22.5% were 65 years of age or older. The gender makeup of the village was 47.6% male and 52.4% female.

=== 2000 census ===
As of the census of 2000, there were 860 people, 423 households, and 233 families living in the village. The population density was 1,505.8 inhabitants per square mile (581.4/km^{2}). There were 471 housing units at an average density of 824.7 per square mile (318.4/km^{2}). The racial makeup of the village was 92.44% White, 2.09% African American, 0.23% Native American, 3.72% Asian, 0.81% from other races, and 0.70% from two or more races. Hispanic or Latino of any race were 0.93% of the population.

There were 423 households, out of which 18.9% had children under the age of 18 living with them, 48.5% were married couples living together, 4.5% had a female householder with no husband present, and 44.7% were non-families. 40.4% of all households were made up of individuals, and 24.3% had someone living alone who was 65 years of age or older. The average household size was 2.03 and the average family size was 2.74.

In the village, the population was spread out, with 18.5% under the age of 18, 2.2% from 18 to 24, 25.0% from 25 to 44, 29.2% from 45 to 64, and 25.1% who were 65 years of age or older. The median age was 48 years. For every 100 females, there were 92.0 males. For every 100 females age 18 and over, there were 87.9 males.

The median income for a household in the village was $51,333, and the median income for a family was $64,375. Males had a median income of $52,381 versus $28,750 for females. The per capita income for the village was $32,449. About 3.5% of families and 5.5% of the population were below the poverty line, including 4.4% of those under age 18 and 3.6% of those age 65 or over.
